= Leioproctus platyceratus =

Scientific classification
- Kingdom: Animalia
- Phylum: Arthropoda
- Clade: Pancrustacea
- Class: Insecta
- Order: Hymenoptera
- Family: Colletidae
- Genus: Leioproctus
- Species: L. platyceratus

Binomial name
- Leioproctus platyceratus Batley, 2025

Species of bee

Leioproctus platyceratus, or Leioproctus (Leioproctus) platyceratus, is a species of bee in the family Colletidae and subfamily Colletinae. It is endemic to Australia. It was described by entomologist Michael Batley in 2025.

== Etymology ==
The specific epithet platyceratus (Latin: "flat-horned") is an anatomical reference to "the labial palpus of the male which has a broad, flat proximal segment".

== Description ==
The holotype male body length is 6.5 mm, head width 2.0 mm; female body length 7.6 mm, head width 2.4 mm. Integumental colouration is mainly black with brown markings. The hair is pale gold to dark brown.

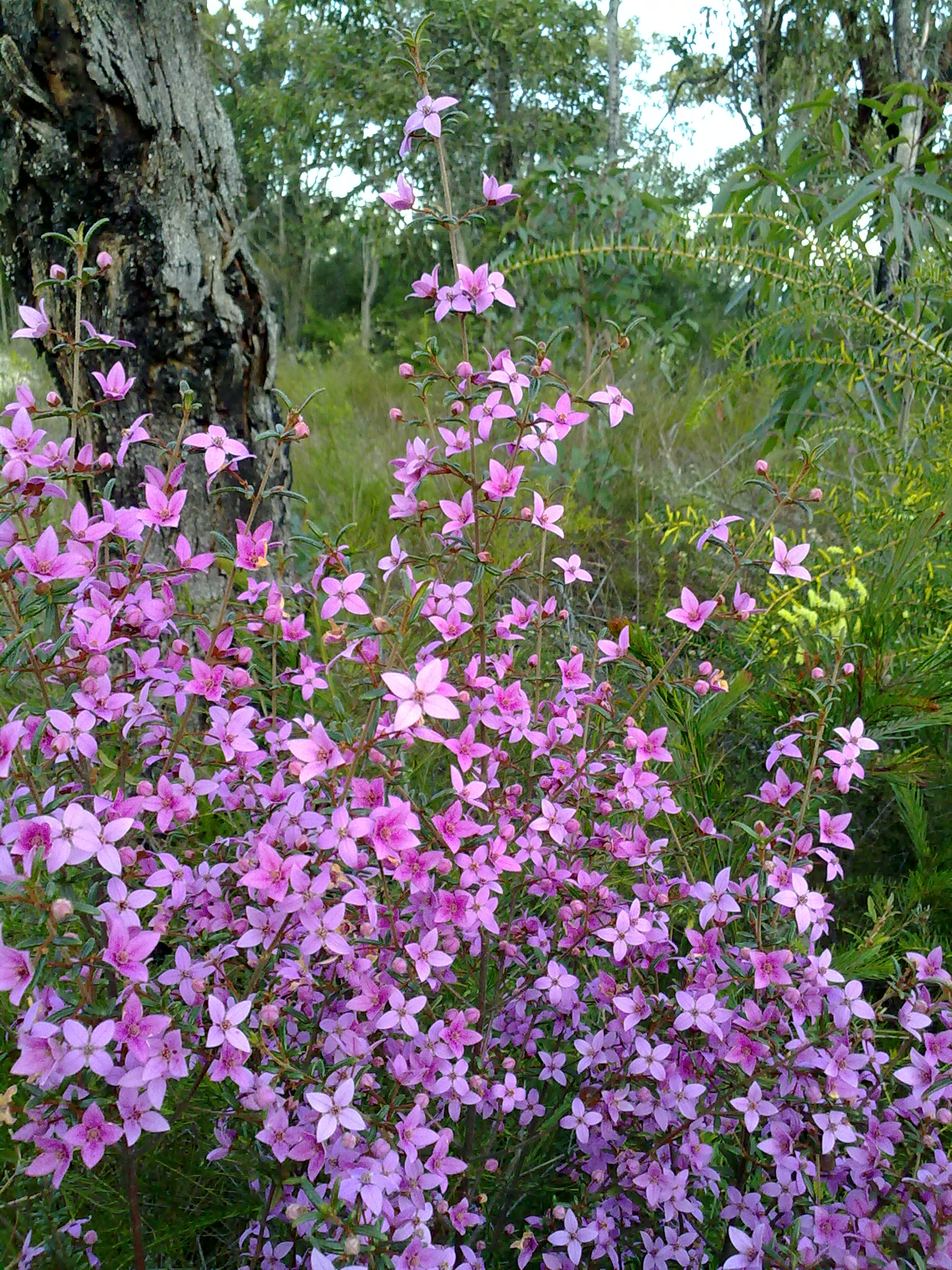
Boronia ledifolia (showy boronia), a forage plant of the bees

== Distribution and habitat ==
The species occurs in eastern New South Wales. The type locality is Commodore Heights, Ku-ring-gai Chase National Park, Sydney.

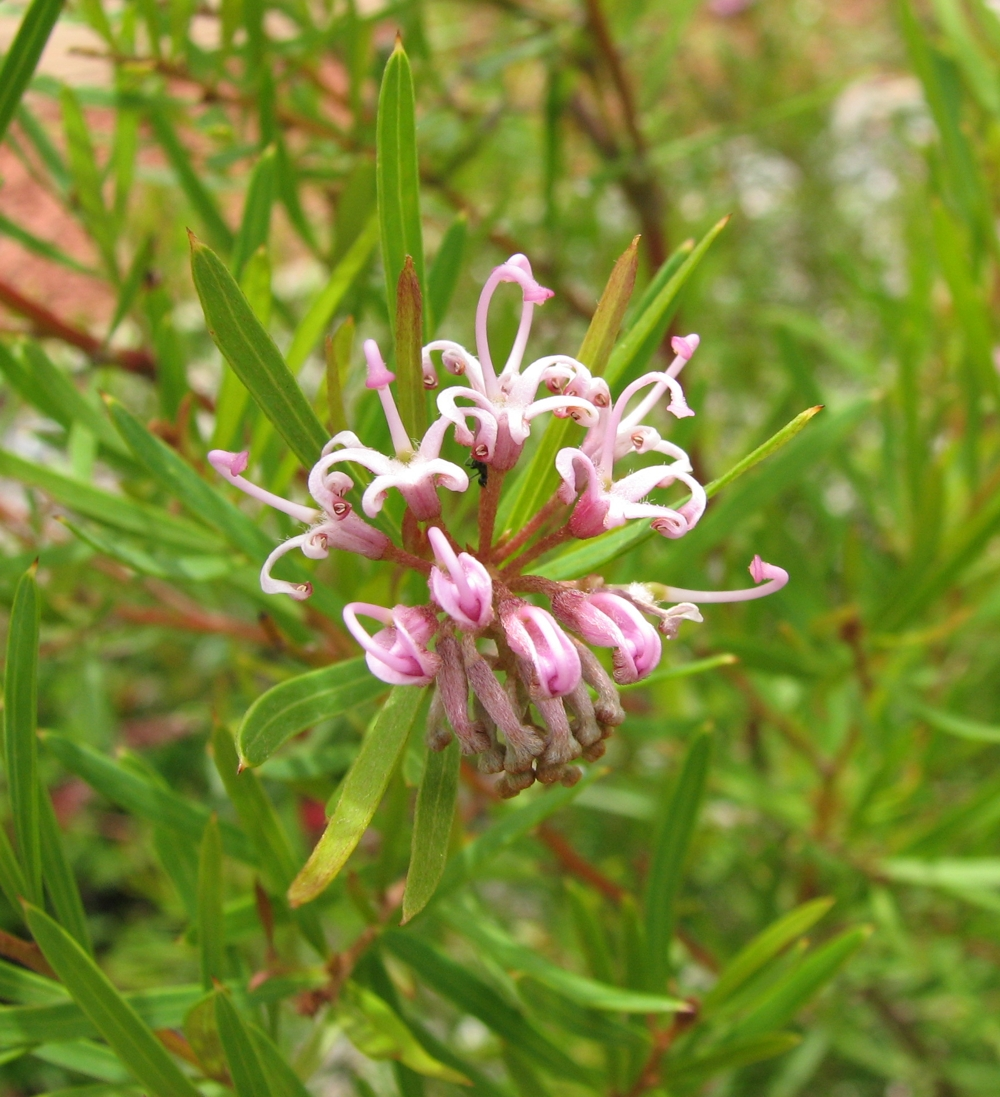
Grevillea sericea (pink spider flower), a forage plant of the bees

== Behaviour ==
The adults are flying mellivores. Flowering plants visited by the bees include Boronia ledifolia and Grevillea sericea.
