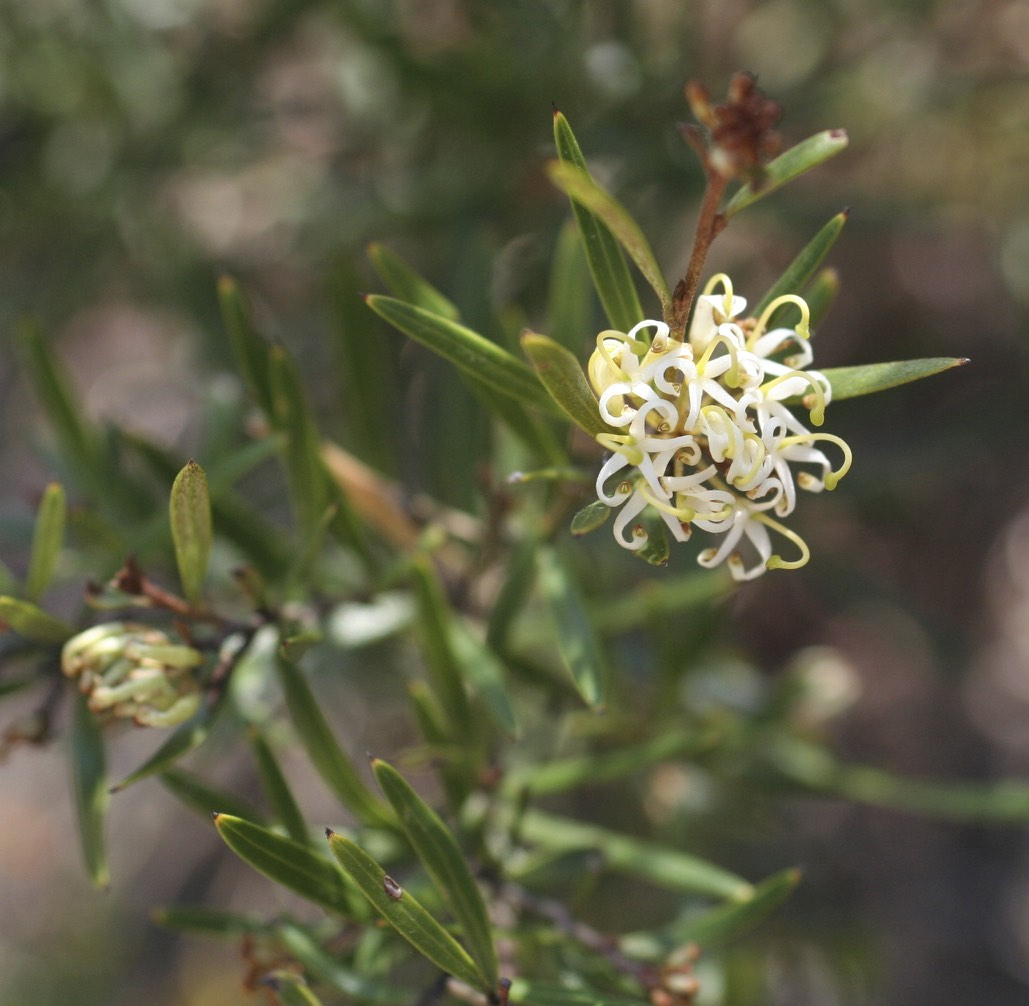
- In Girraween National Park

Scientific classification
- Kingdom: Plantae
- Clade: Tracheophytes
- Clade: Angiosperms
- Clade: Eudicots
- Order: Proteales
- Family: Proteaceae
- Genus: Grevillea
- Species: G. viridiflava

Binomial name
- Grevillea viridiflava Makinson

Synonyms
- Grevillea linearifolia Northern form p.p.; Grevillea linearifolia f. 'Darling Downs form'; Grevillea linearifolia f. 'Torrington form'; Grevillea linearifolia f. 'c' (Montane Elements)

= Grevillea viridiflava =

Species of shrub endemic to Australia

Grevillea viridiflava, commonly known as linear-leaf grevillea, is species of flowering plant in the family Proteaceae and is endemic to eastern Australia. It is an erect, spindly shrub with linear to narrowly elliptic leaves, and clusters of 12 to 24 white flowers with a yellowish-green or cream-coloured style.

== Description ==
Grevillea viridiflava is an erect, spindly shrub that typically grows to a height of 0.5–1 m (1 ft 8 in – 3 ft 3 in), and often forms a rhizome. Its leaves are linear to narrowly elliptic, mostly 30–60 mm (1.2–2.4 in) long and 2–3 mm (0.079–0.118 in) wide. The edges of the leaves are rolled under, the upper surface is glabrous and the lower surface silky-hairy. The flowers are arranged in clusters of 12 to 24 on the ends of branches, and are greenish or yellowish in the bud stage, later white with a yellowish green or cream-coloured style, the pistil 7–9.5 mm (0.28–0.37 in) long. Flowering occurs from August to January and the fruit is a lumpy follicle 9–11 mm (0.35–0.43 in) long.

== Taxonomy ==
Grevillea viridiflava was first formally described in 2000 by Robert Makinson in the Flora of Australia from specimens collected near Torrington in 1988.

== Distribution and habitat ==
Linear-leaf grevillea in the shrubby understorey of forest in moist places at altitudes of 850–1,000 m (2,790–3,280 ft) in montane areas of south-eastern Queensland and north-eastern New South Wales.
