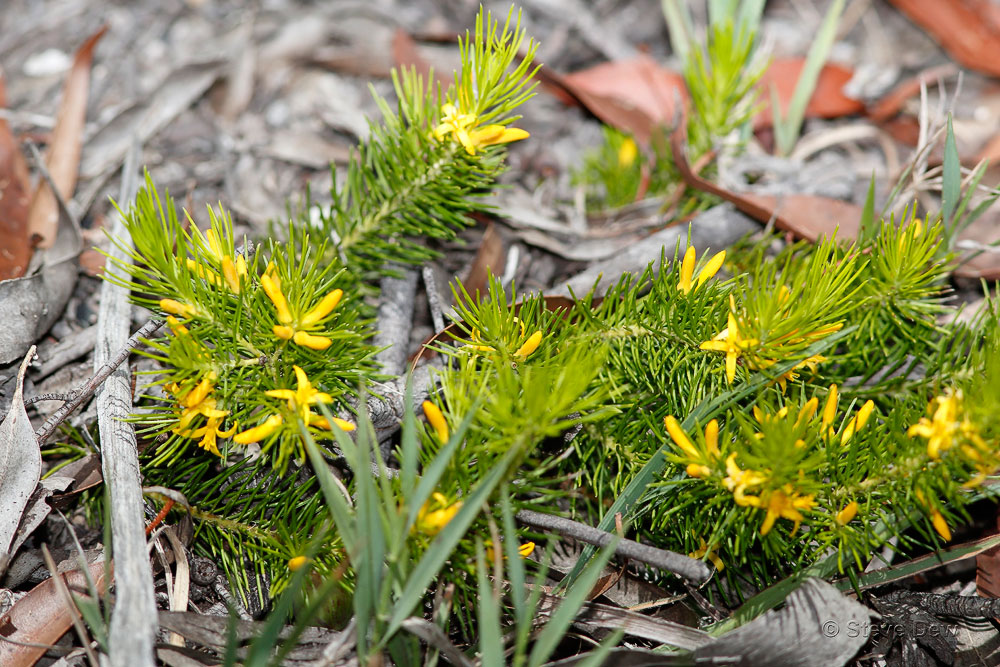
- Persoonia tenuifolia in Bald Rock National Park

Scientific classification
- Kingdom: Plantae
- Clade: Tracheophytes
- Clade: Angiosperms
- Clade: Eudicots
- Order: Proteales
- Family: Proteaceae
- Genus: Persoonia
- Species: P. tenuifolia

Binomial name
- Persoonia tenuifolia R.Br.

Synonyms
- Linkia tenuifolia (R.Br.) Kuntze; Persoonia strangeana Meisn. nom. inval., pro syn.

= Persoonia tenuifolia =

Fine-leaf geebung

Species of flowering plant

Persoonia tenuifolia, commonly known as fine-leaf geebung is a plant in the family Proteaceae and is endemic to eastern Australia. It is an erect to low-lying shrub with hairy young branchlets, linear leaves, and yellow flowers in groups of up to eight on a rachis 2–30 mm (0.079–1.181 in) long that continues to grow after flowering.

== Description ==
Persoonia tenuifolia is a spreading to low-lying shrub that typically grows to a height of 20–50 cm (7.9–19.7 in) with its young branchlets covered with greyish hairs. The leaves are linear, 10–25 mm (0.39–0.98 in) long, 0.3–0.5 mm (0.012–0.020 in) wide and that usually curve upwards, with a groove on the lower surface. The flowers are arranged in groups of up to eight along a rachis 2–30 mm (0.079–1.181 in) long that usually continues to grow after flowering, each flower on a hairy pedicel 1–3 mm (0.039–0.118 in) long with a leaf at its base. The tepals are yellow and 8–10 mm (0.31–0.39 in) long and glabrous. Flowering mainly occurs from November to February.

== Taxonomy ==
Persoonia tenuifolia was first formally described in 1830 by Robert Brown in the Supplementum to his Prodromus Florae Novae Hollandiae et Insulae Van Diemen from specimens collected in 1827 near Moreton Bay by Charles Fraser.

== Distribution and habitat ==
Fine-leaf geebung grows in heath and forest from sea level to an altitude of 1,050 m (3,440 ft). It is found in near-coastal areas between Bundaberg in Queensland and Grafton in New South Wales and well as on the Great Dividing Range and nearby tablelands from Dalveen in Queensland to the Torrington and Yetman districts in New South Wales.
