= Leioproctus latipes =

Scientific classification
- Kingdom: Animalia
- Phylum: Arthropoda
- Clade: Pancrustacea
- Class: Insecta
- Order: Hymenoptera
- Family: Colletidae
- Genus: Leioproctus
- Species: L. latipes

Binomial name
- Leioproctus latipes Batley, 2025

Species of bee

Leioproctus latipes, or Leioproctus (Euryglossidia) latipes, is a species of bee in the family Colletidae and subfamily Colletinae. It is endemic to Australia. It was described by entomologist Michael Batley in 2025.

== Etymology ==
The specific epithet latipes (Latin: "broad foot") is an anatomical reference to the four distal segments of the fore tarsus.

== Description ==
The female body length is 6.7 mm, male body length 5.5 mm. Integumental colouration is mainly black, the metasoma red-brown with dark suffusions (female), or banded dark brown and orange (male). The hair is white to golden.

== Distribution and habitat ==
The species occurs in eastern New South Wales. The type locality is Mount Colah, Sydney.

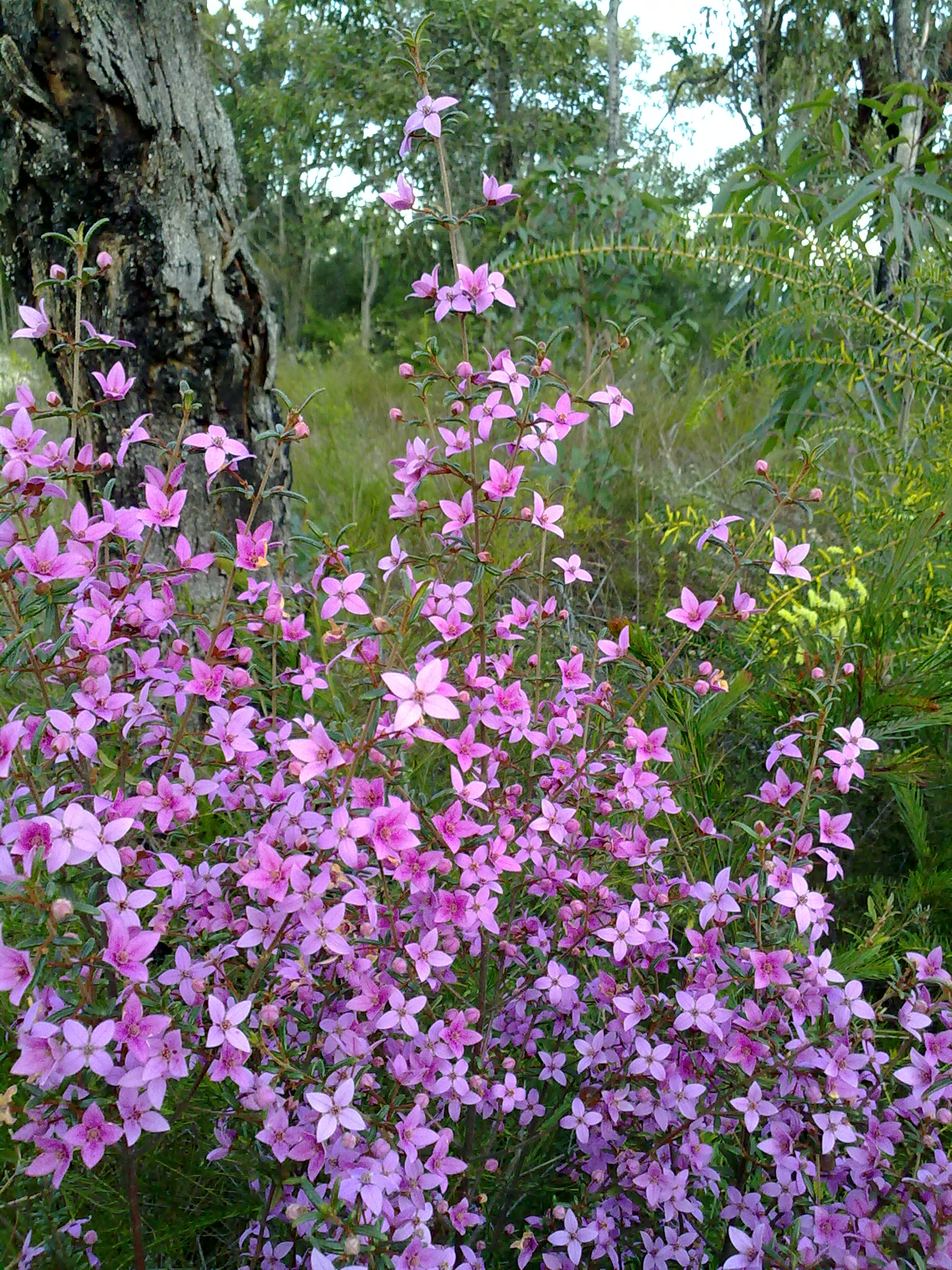
Flowers of Boronia ledifolia (showy boronia), a forage plant of the bees

== Behaviour ==
The adults are flying mellivores. Flowering plants visited by the bees include Boronia ledifolia and Acacia parramattensis.

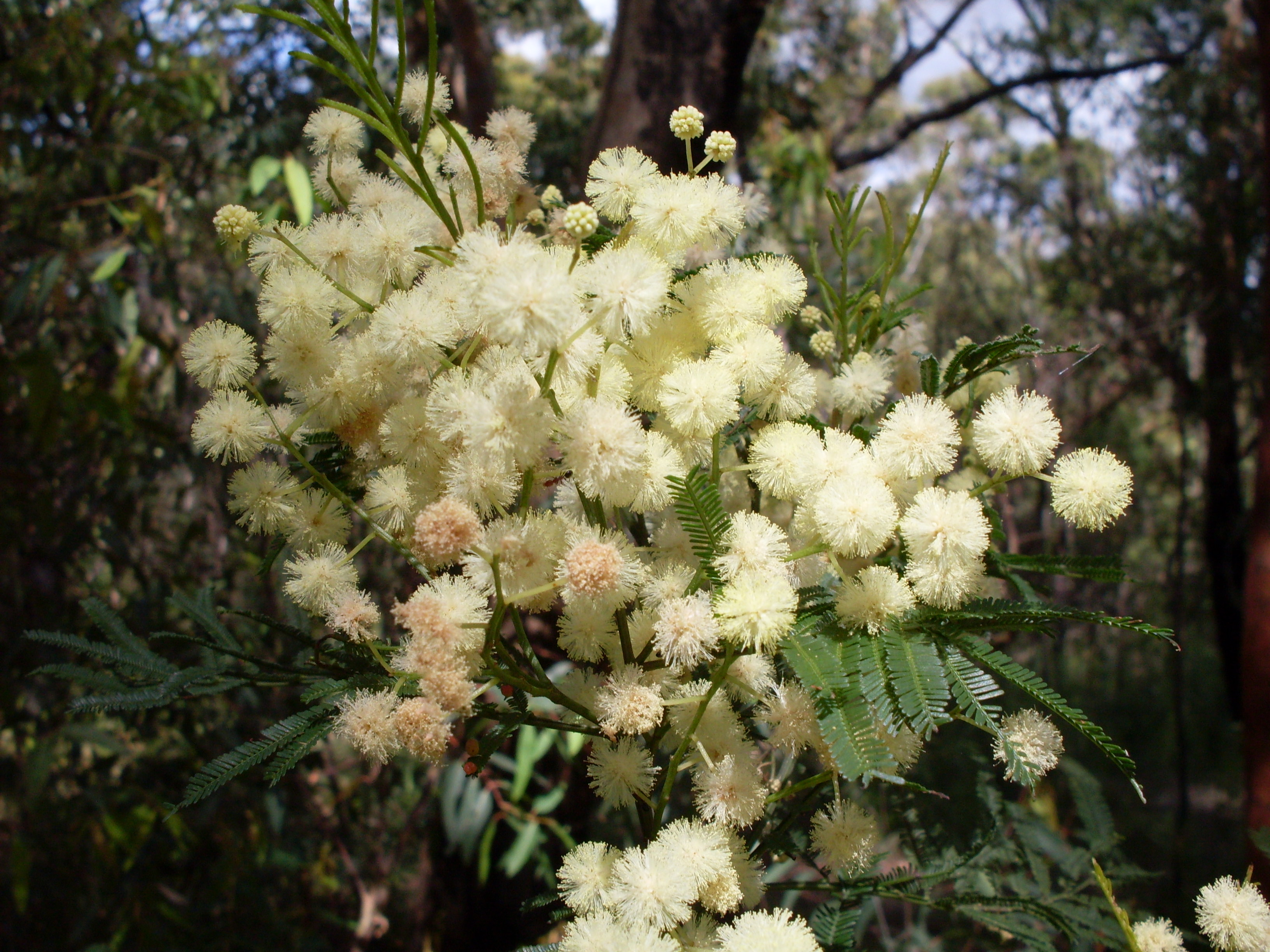
Flowers of Acacia parramattensis (Parramatta wattle), a forage plant of the bees
