= Leioproctus boroniae =

Scientific classification
- Kingdom: Animalia
- Phylum: Arthropoda
- Clade: Pancrustacea
- Class: Insecta
- Order: Hymenoptera
- Family: Colletidae
- Genus: Leioproctus
- Species: L. boroniae

Binomial name
- Leioproctus boroniae (Cockerell, 1921)

Synonyms
- Paracolletes boroniae Cockerell, 1921

Species of bee

Leioproctus boroniae, or Leioproctus (Leioproctus) boroniae, is a species of bee in the family Colletidae and subfamily Colletinae. It is endemic to Australia. It was described by British-American entomologist Theodore Dru Alison Cockerell in 1921.

== Description ==
Female body length is about 11 mm. Colouration is mainly black; the abdomen is "peacock-green, quite brilliant and beautiful, with a rather satiny gloss"; with white, grey and black hair.

== Distribution and habitat ==
The species occurs in eastern Australia. The type locality is Birkdale, Queensland, near Brisbane.

== Behaviour ==
The adults are flying mellivores. Flowering plants visited by the bees include Boronia ledifolia.

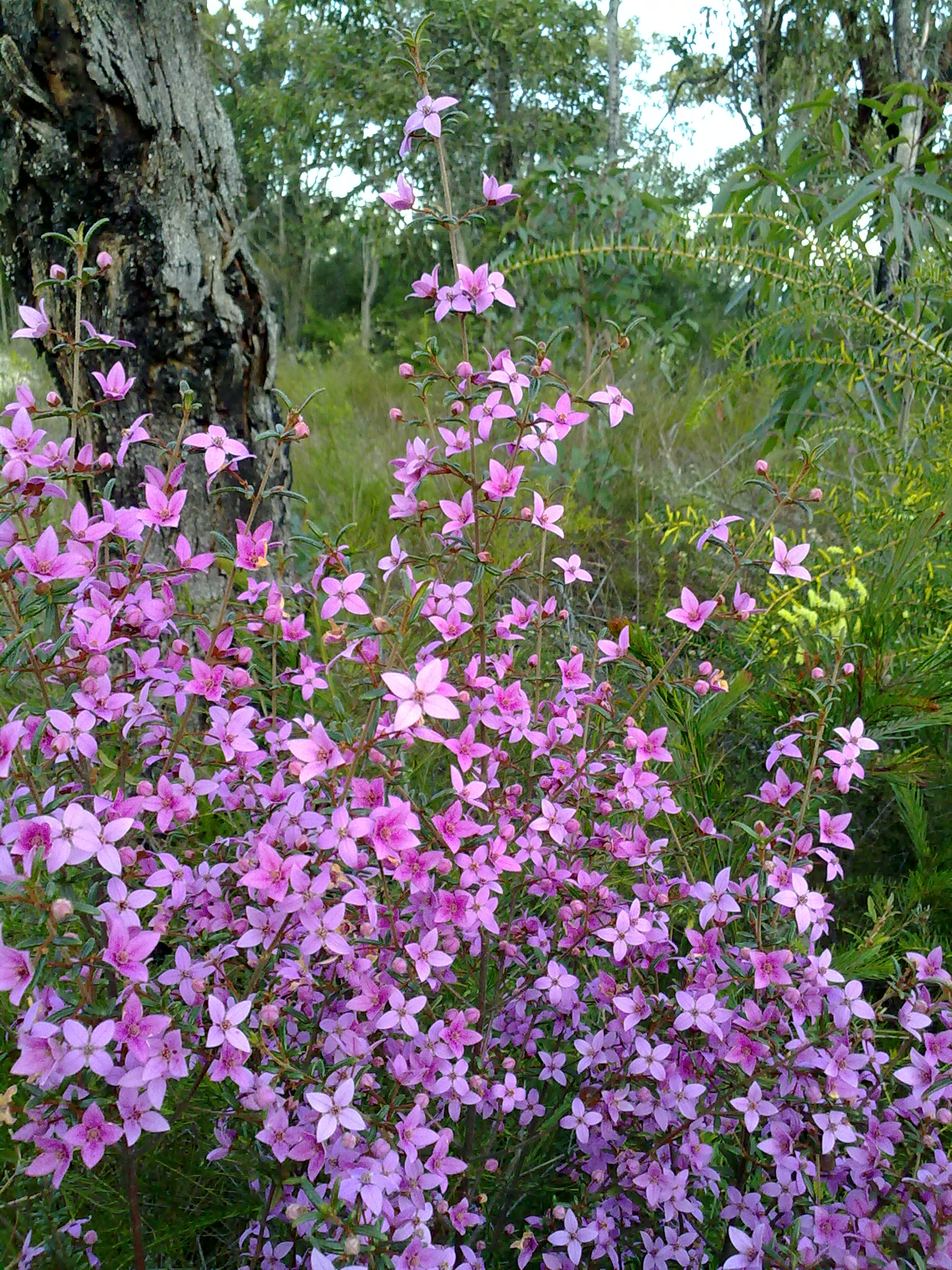
Boronia ledifolia (showy boronia), a forage plant of the bees
