= Leioproctus tritus =

Scientific classification
- Kingdom: Animalia
- Phylum: Arthropoda
- Clade: Pancrustacea
- Class: Insecta
- Order: Hymenoptera
- Family: Colletidae
- Genus: Leioproctus
- Species: L. tritus

Binomial name
- Leioproctus tritus Batley, 2025

Species of bee

Leioproctus tritus, or Leioproctus (Leioproctus) tritus, is a species of bee in the family Colletidae and subfamily Colletinae. It is endemic to Australia. It was described by entomologist Michael Batley in 2025.

== Etymology ==
The specific epithet tritus (Latin: "commonplace" or "familiar") refers to "the absence of particularly distinctive features".

== Description ==
The holotype male body length is 7.5 mm, head width 2.4 mm; female body length 8.5 mm, head width 2.9 mm. Integumental colouration is mainly black with brown markings. The hair is white through brown to black.

== Distribution and habitat ==
The species occurs in eastern New South Wales. The type locality is Commodore Heights, Ku-ring-gai Chase National Park, Sydney.

== Behaviour ==
The adults are flying mellivores. Flowering plants visited by the bees include Boronia ledifolia, Isopogon anemonifolius and Grevillea buxifolia.

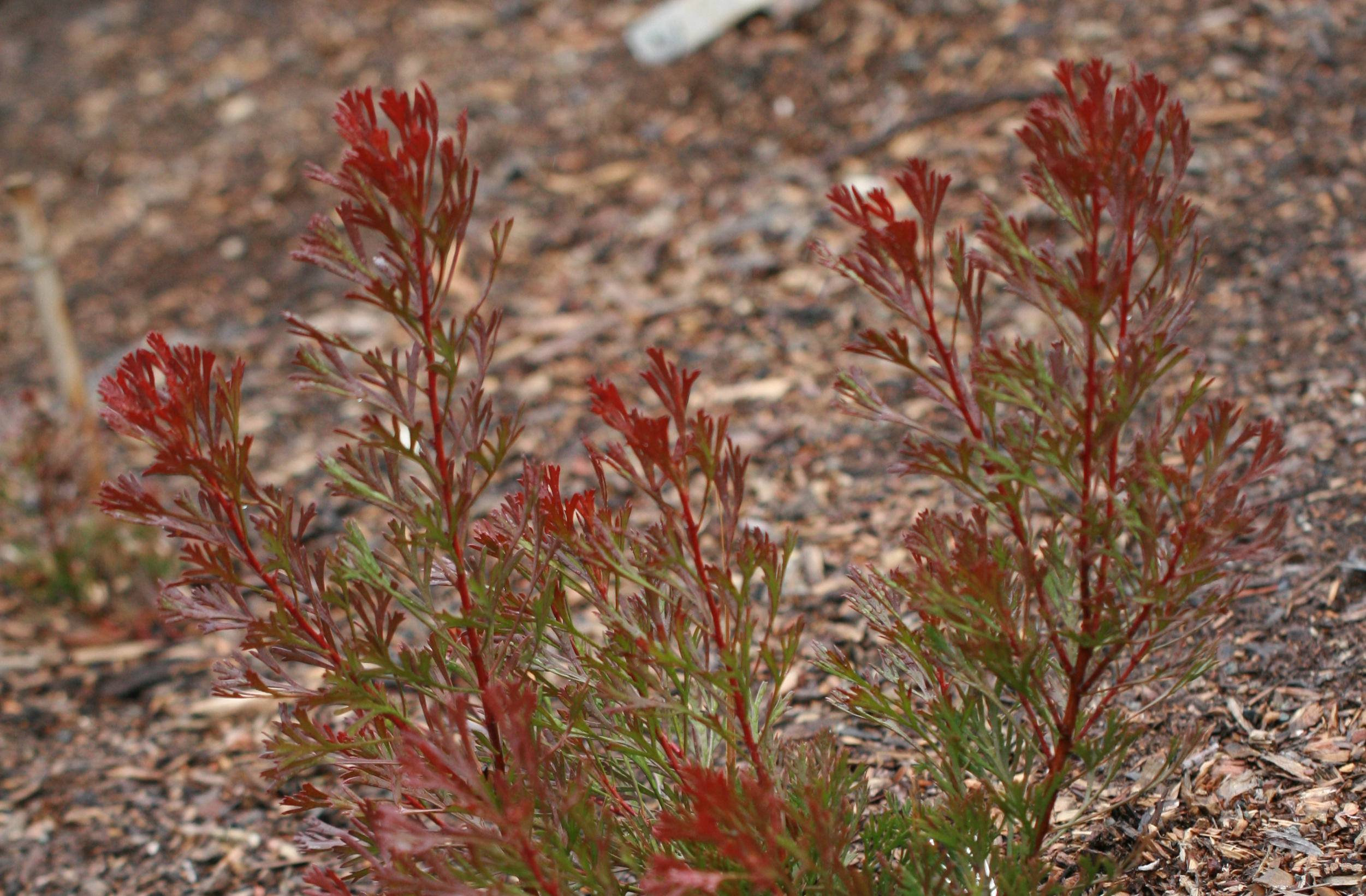
Isopogon anemonifolius (broad-leaved drumsticks), a forage plant of the bees

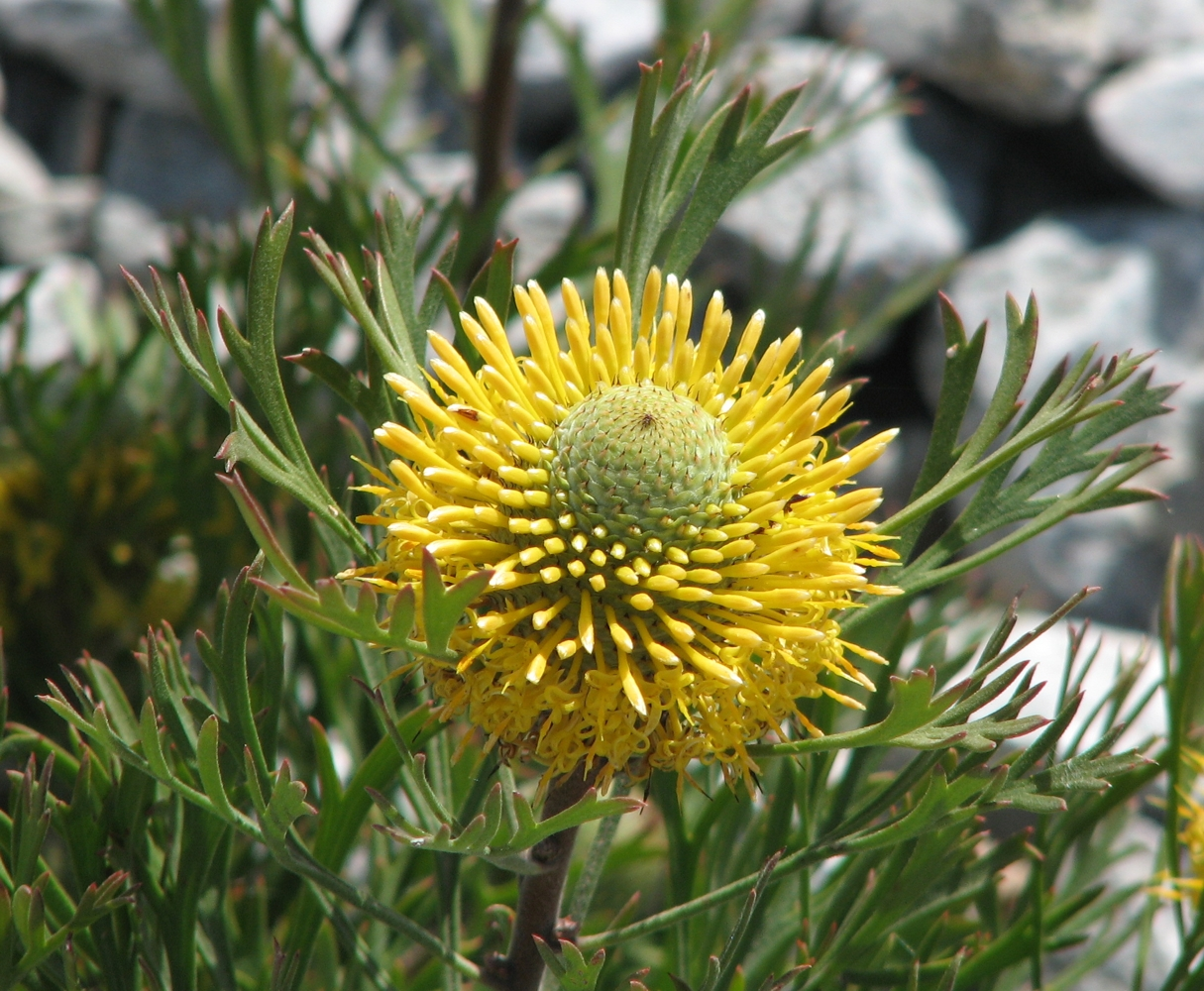
Flower of Isopogon anemonifolius
