= Girraween National Park =

National park in Australia

- IUCN category II (national park)
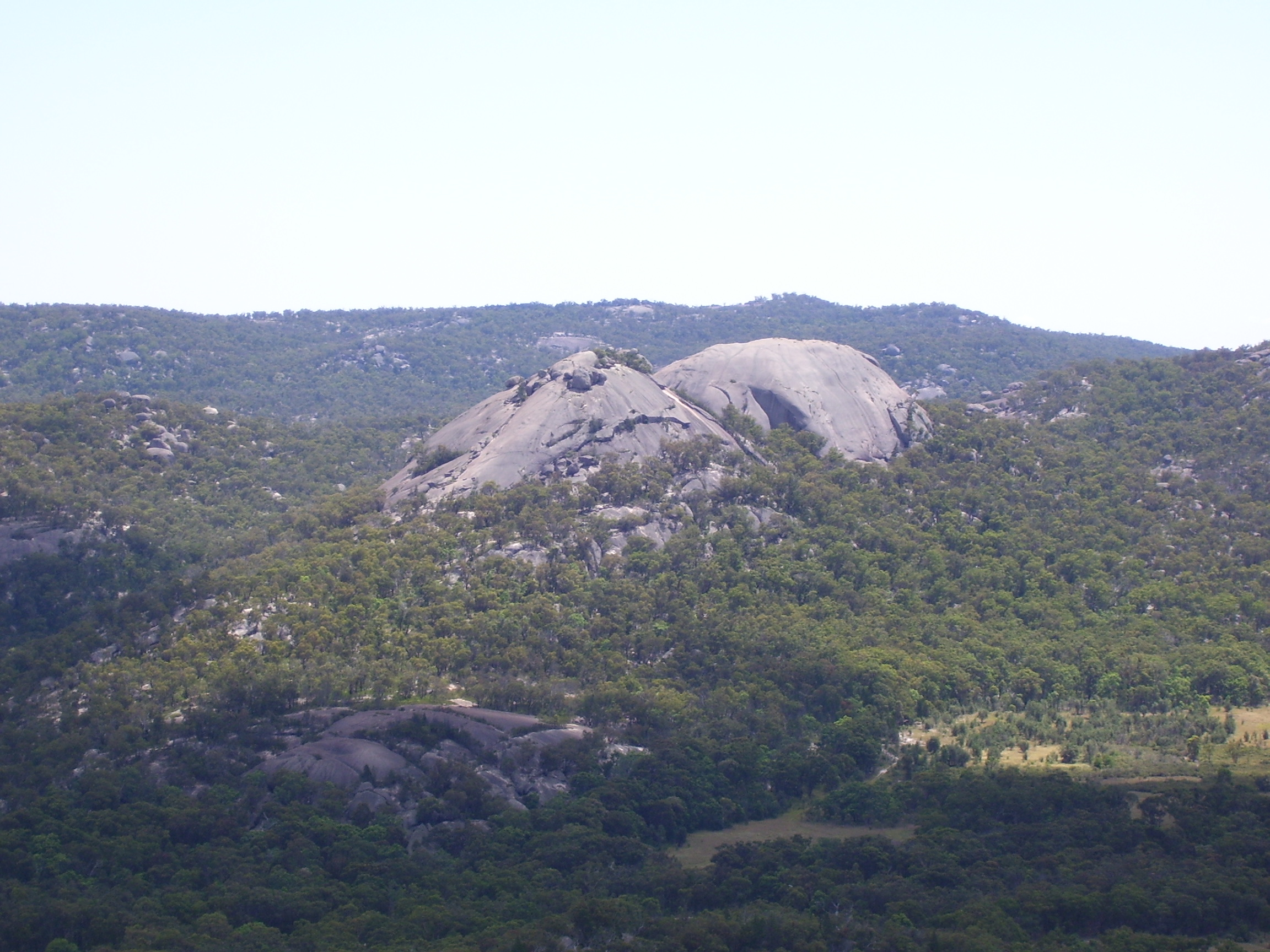
- Granite domes known as the Pyramids

- Location within Queensland
- Location: Queensland
- Nearest city: Stanthorpe
- Coordinates: 28°46′27″S 151°54′43″E
- Area: 117 km^{2} (45 sq mi)
- Established: 21 October 1966
- Governing body: Queensland Parks and Wildlife Service
- Website: Official website

Girraween National Park is a 117-square-kilometre (45 sq mi) protected area located in the Granite Belt region of the Darling Downs in southeastern Queensland, Australia. Established in 1966, the park is renowned for its spectacular granite landscapes, distinctive balancing boulders, diverse wildflower displays, and unique wildlife assemblages. The park's name is derived from an Aboriginal word meaning "place of flowers", reflecting the area's remarkable botanical diversity, particularly during the spring wildflower season.

Located at elevations ranging from approximately 800 to 1,267 metres above sea level, Girraween National Park forms part of the Great Dividing Range and shares its southern border with Bald Rock National Park in New South Wales. The park is distinguished by its ancient granite formations, including massive domes, tors, and balancing rocks that have been sculpted by millions of years of weathering and erosion. These geological features, combined with cool temperate eucalypt forests, heathlands, and pristine mountain streams, create a landscape of exceptional scenic and scientific value.

Bushwalking, rock climbing, camping, and nature photography are the primary recreational activities, with the park offering more than 17 kilometres of graded walking tracks leading to iconic landmarks such as the Pyramids, Castle Rock, and Mount Norman. The park's biodiversity is notable for southeastern Queensland, supporting species typically found in cooler, more southerly regions, including the common wombat, spotted quoll, and turquoise parrot.

== Location ==
The park is situated 40 km south of Stanthorpe. The southern boundary of the park is the state border between Queensland and New South Wales. It is a twin park with Bald Rock National Park, which lies across the border in New South Wales, and features Bald Rock, the second-largest monolith (after Uluru) on the continent. Curiously, South Bald Rock and West Bald Rock lie in Girraween National Park in Queensland, not in Bald Rock National Park in New South Wales.

== History ==
=== Aboriginal heritage ===
The Girraween area has been inhabited by Aboriginal Australians for thousands of years. The park's name is derived from an Aboriginal word meaning "place of flowers", reflecting the deep cultural connection between Indigenous peoples and the land's seasonal wildflower displays. Archaeological evidence suggests that Aboriginal groups used the area's granite formations for shelter and ceremony, with the abundant spring water and diverse plant and animal resources providing sustenance throughout the year.

=== European exploration and settlement ===
European exploration of the region began in the mid-19th century, with early settlers attracted to the area's grazing potential and later drawn by the discovery of tin deposits in the surrounding Granite Belt region. The rugged granite landscape and remote location initially limited settlement, helping to preserve the area's natural values.

=== National park establishment ===
Girraween National Park was officially established on 21 October 1966, as part of Queensland's expanding protected area system. The park's creation was driven by recognition of its unique granite landscapes, botanical diversity, and the need to protect important wildlife habitat. The park's establishment also recognized the recreational value of the area for bushwalking and rock climbing enthusiasts.

=== Modern management ===
Since its establishment, the park has been managed by various Queensland government agencies, currently the Queensland Parks and Wildlife Service. Management efforts have focused on balancing conservation objectives with recreational access, including the development of walking trail infrastructure, camping facilities, and visitor education programs. The park's twin relationship with Bald Rock National Park in New South Wales has led to collaborative management approaches across state boundaries.

== Features ==
=== Geology and landforms ===
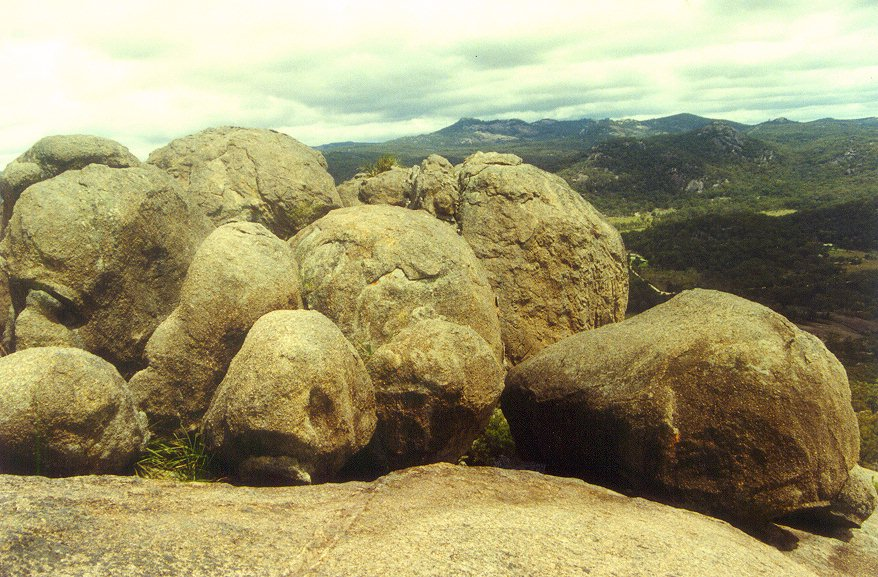
Granite outcrops are a feature of the park.

Girraween National Park showcases some of Australia's most spectacular granite landscapes, formed from the Stanthorpe Adamellite, a type of granite that intruded into the Earth's crust approximately 230–250 million years ago during the Triassic period. The park's distinctive landforms result from millions of years of weathering and erosion, which have carved the granite into dramatic domes, tors, and balancing rock formations.

The granite outcroppings dominate the local scenery, with notable features including the iconic Pyramids, Castle Rock at 1,112 metres (3,648 ft) above sea level, and the distinctive balancing boulders that appear to defy gravity. These formations are the result of spheroidal weathering, where the granite has been weathered along joint lines, creating the characteristic rounded boulder formations. The park's highest point is Mount Norman at 1,267 metres (4,157 ft), which offers panoramic views across the Granite Belt landscape.

Other significant geological features include the Eye of the Needle, a natural rock arch formation, and Turtle Rock, a massive granite dome that resembles its namesake. The granite surfaces throughout the park display various stages of weathering, from fresh rock faces popular with climbers to deeply weathered boulder fields and sandy grus deposits.

=== Hydrology ===
The park contains several pristine mountain streams and seasonal waterfalls, including Underground Creek, which flows through a series of granite gorges and pools. These waterways are fed by reliable rainfall and provide critical habitat for aquatic species, including the rare Bald Rock Creek turtle. The granite landscape creates natural rock pools and cascades that are particularly scenic following rainfall.

=== Walking trails and landmarks ===
The park contains an extensive network of more than 17 kilometres of graded walking trails that provide access to the park's major geological and scenic attractions. These trails range from short walks suitable for families to challenging hikes for experienced bushwalkers:

- The Pyramids Track (2.8 kilometres (1.7 mi) return): Leading to the park's most iconic granite domes
- Castle Rock Track (6.4 kilometres (4.0 mi) return): A challenging climb to one of the park's highest peaks
- Mount Norman Track (11.4 kilometres (7.1 mi) return): The most demanding hike to the park's summit
- Underground Creek Circuit (9 kilometres (5.6 mi)): Following the creek through varied landscapes
- Dr. Roberts Waterhole (600 metres (2,000 ft) return): An easy walk to a popular swimming spot

Fire trails provide access to the southern and eastern sections of the park for more experienced walkers seeking wilderness experiences. The park's temperate climate makes it accessible year-round, though winter snow can occasionally affect higher elevations.

=== Fauna and flora ===
==== Flora ====
Girraween derives its name from an Aboriginal word meaning 'place of flowers', and the park justifies this designation with remarkable botanical diversity spanning multiple vegetation communities. The park's elevation range and varied topography create distinct habitat zones, from tall open eucalypt forests in sheltered valleys to exposed granite heath communities on rocky outcrops.

The eucalypt forests are dominated by species such as New England peppermint (Eucalyptus nova-anglica), yellow stringybark (E. muelleriana), and broad-leaved peppermint (E. dives). The understory features diverse shrub species including various Acacia species, with the spectacular golden wattle (A. pycnantha) providing brilliant yellow displays in late July and August.

The heathland communities on granite outcrops and ridges support specialized plant assemblages adapted to exposed conditions and shallow soils. These areas are particularly rich in wildflowers during spring (August to November), featuring species such as showy boronia, various Grevillea species, and endemic Epacris heath species.

A particularly significant botanical feature is the park's population of Wallangarra white gum (Eucalyptus scoparia), which occurs naturally only in this region. This rare eucalyptus species is found in scattered stands throughout the park and is considered a relict species from cooler, wetter climatic periods.

The park's wetland areas and creek systems support riparian vegetation including river oak (Casuarina cunninghamiana) and various sedge and rush species that provide important habitat for aquatic fauna.

==== Fauna ====
Girraween National Park supports a diverse fauna assemblage that includes many species at the northern limit of their range, reflecting the park's position in the cool temperate highlands of southeastern Queensland. The park's fauna is notable for including several species more commonly associated with cooler, more southerly regions of Australia.

Mammals: The park is home to approximately 40 mammal species. Large herbivores include the common wombat (Vombatus ursinus), which finds ideal habitat in the park's rocky terrain and is frequently observed by visitors. The red-necked wallaby (Macropus rufogriseus) and swamp wallaby (Wallabia bicolor) are common throughout the park. Smaller mammals include several species of native rodents, bats, and the sugar glider (Petaurus breviceps).

Predatory mammals include the spotted quoll (Dasyurus maculatus), one of Australia's largest carnivorous marsupials, which finds suitable habitat in the park's dense forest areas. The red fox and feral goat are introduced species that require ongoing management.

Birds: The park supports over 120 bird species, making it an important area for avian diversity in southeastern Queensland. Notable species include the superb lyrebird (Menura novaehollandiae), which reaches near its northern distributional limit in the park and is famous for its extraordinary vocal mimicry abilities. The turquoise parrot (Neophema pulchella) is another significant species, with Girraween supporting one of Queensland's few breeding populations.

Other notable bird species include the peregrine falcon (Falco peregrinus), powerful owl (Ninox strenua), and various honeyeater species that play important pollination roles. The park's diverse habitats support both forest-dwelling species and those adapted to more open woodland environments.

Reptiles and amphibians: The park's reptile fauna includes several skink and gecko species adapted to the granite boulder habitat. The rare Bald Rock Creek turtle (Elseya sp.) was discovered in the park in 1992 by Taronga Park Zoo staff and remains known only from a ten-kilometre stretch of Bald Rock Creek. This discovery highlighted the park's importance for endemic and rare species conservation.

Invertebrates: The park supports diverse invertebrate communities, particularly in leaf litter, under granite boulders, and in aquatic environments. These communities include numerous endemic species adapted to the park's unique granite landscapes and are the subject of ongoing scientific research.

== Climate and weather ==
Girraween National Park experiences a temperate climate characteristic of the southeastern Queensland highlands, with distinct seasonal variations that significantly influence both visitor experience and ecological processes. The park's elevation, ranging from approximately 800 to 1,267 metres above sea level, creates cooler conditions than the surrounding lowlands and contributes to the area's unique ecological character.

Temperature: The park experiences mild summers and cool winters. Summer temperatures (December to February) typically range from 12 °C (54 °F) to 25 °C (77 °F), providing pleasant conditions for bushwalking and camping. Winter temperatures (June to August) range from −2 °C (28 °F) to 16 °C (61 °F), with occasional frost and rare snowfall events, particularly at higher elevations around Mount Norman and Castle Rock.

Rainfall: The park receives an average annual rainfall of approximately 750 millimetres (30 in), with precipitation distributed relatively evenly throughout the year. The wettest months are typically December to March, coinciding with the summer storm season, while the driest period usually occurs from July to September. The granite landscape efficiently channels rainfall into the park's creek systems, maintaining reliable water flows in most years.

Seasonal variations: Each season offers distinct experiences for visitors:

- Spring (September–November): The peak wildflower season when the park lives up to its "place of flowers" name, with mild temperatures and moderate rainfall
- Summer (December–February): Warm days ideal for swimming in rock pools, but afternoon thunderstorms are common
- Autumn (March–May): Stable weather conditions with excellent visibility for photography and panoramic views
- Winter (June–August): Cool, crisp conditions perfect for challenging hikes, with occasional frost creating stunning ice formations on granite surfaces

Best visiting times: While the park is accessible year-round, the optimal visiting periods are autumn (March–May) for stable weather and excellent hiking conditions, and spring (August–November) for wildflower displays and moderate temperatures. Winter offers unique experiences for those prepared for cold conditions, while summer provides opportunities for water-based activities despite the possibility of afternoon storms.

== Recreation and activities ==
=== Bushwalking ===
Bushwalking is the park's most popular activity, with an extensive network of marked trails catering to all fitness levels and experience. The park's walking track system provides access to its most spectacular geological and scenic features while minimizing environmental impact through careful route planning and construction.

Graded walking tracks:

- Easy walks (suitable for families): Dr. Roberts Waterhole (600 metres (2,000 ft) return), Sphinx Rock (1.5 kilometres (0.93 mi) return)
- Moderate walks: The Pyramids (2.8 kilometres (1.7 mi) return), Junction Rock (3.2 kilometres (2.0 mi) return)
- Challenging walks: Castle Rock (6.4 kilometres (4.0 mi) return), Mount Norman Summit (11.4 kilometres (7.1 mi) return)
- Multi-day options: Extended circuits combining multiple tracks with camping at Castle Rock

The tracks are well-maintained with clear signage, distance markers, and interpretive information. Most walks feature significant elevation gain over granite surfaces, requiring appropriate footwear and preparation.

=== Rock climbing ===
Girraween National Park is renowned as one of southeastern Australia's premier rock climbing destinations, offering routes for all skill levels on high-quality granite. The park's climbing areas feature excellent friction climbing on clean granite slabs, dramatic crack systems, and challenging boulder problems.

Major climbing areas:

- The Pyramids: Multi-pitch traditional routes up to grade 20, including classic lines such as "Fool's Gold" and "Moonrise"
- Castle Rock: Technical face climbing and crack systems, with routes ranging from beginner to expert level
- Bald Rock areas: Extensive slab climbing and boulder problems
- Turtle Rock: Sport and traditional climbing on featured granite faces

Rock climbing in the park requires permits and adherence to environmental guidelines to protect nesting birds and sensitive vegetation. Seasonal closures may apply to certain areas during bird breeding seasons (typically August to December).

=== Nature photography and wildlife observation ===
The park's diverse landscapes, seasonal wildflower displays, and wildlife populations make it a premier destination for nature photography. Notable photographic opportunities include sunrise and sunset lighting on granite formations, wildflower macro photography during spring, and wildlife observation throughout the year.

=== Swimming and water activities ===
During warmer months, the park's natural rock pools and creek systems provide opportunities for swimming and cooling off. Popular swimming spots include Dr. Roberts Waterhole and various granite pools along Underground Creek. Visitors should exercise caution as water levels and temperatures can vary significantly with seasonal conditions.

== Facilities ==
=== Camping ===
The primary camping facility within Girraween National Park is located at Castle Rock, operated by Queensland Parks and Wildlife Service. This camping area provides a balance between accessibility and wilderness experience, allowing visitors to extend their stay and experience the park's distinctive dawn and dusk lighting conditions.

Castle Rock Camping Area:

- Capacity: Approximately 40 sites accommodating tents, campervans, and small caravans
- Facilities: Modern amenities block with toilets, showers, and disabled access facilities
- Infrastructure: Picnic tables, fire rings (when permitted), and waste disposal facilities
- Booking: Advance reservations required, particularly during peak seasons (spring and autumn)
- Accessibility: Wheelchair accessible amenities and designated accessible camping sites

Camping regulations:

- Maximum stay of 8 consecutive nights
- Quiet hours from 8 PM to 6 AM
- Pets are not permitted in the park
- Generators may be used only during specified hours
- All waste must be packed out or disposed of in designated facilities

=== Visitor amenities ===
Day-use facilities:

- Car parking areas at major trailheads including Castle Rock, Bald Rock Creek, and Dr. Roberts Waterhole
- Picnic areas with tables and shelters at key locations
- Public toilets at Castle Rock and selected day-use areas
- Interpretive signs and information boards throughout the park

Accessibility: The park provides limited accessibility options, with wheelchair access available to the Castle Rock amenities block and some shorter walking tracks. However, most of the park's attractions require moderate to strenuous hiking over uneven granite surfaces.

=== Park services ===
Information and interpretation:

- Self-guided interpretive trails with educational signage
- Park brochures and maps available at entry points
- Online resources and trip planning information
- Seasonal ranger programs and guided walks (when available)

Safety services:

- Emergency contact information displayed at key locations
- First aid facilities at Castle Rock camping area
- Mobile phone coverage varies throughout the park, with limited reception in some remote areas

== Conservation and management ==
=== Conservation values ===
Girraween National Park protects significant biodiversity and geological values within the broader Granite Belt ecosystem. The park serves as an important refuge for cool-climate species at their northern distributional limits and provides critical habitat connectivity with Bald Rock National Park across the Queensland-New South Wales border.

Key conservation priorities:

- Protection of rare and endemic species, including the Bald Rock Creek turtle and Wallangarra white gum
- Maintenance of ecosystem integrity across elevation and vegetation gradients
- Preservation of intact granite landscapes and geological processes
- Conservation of freshwater aquatic ecosystems and riparian zones

=== Management challenges ===
Visitor impact management: The park's popularity, particularly for rock climbing and bushwalking, requires careful management to minimize environmental impacts. High-use areas such as the Pyramids and Castle Rock require ongoing monitoring and maintenance to prevent track erosion, vegetation damage, and wildlife disturbance.

Invasive species control: Several introduced plant and animal species pose ongoing management challenges, including:

- Lantana (Lantana camara) and other exotic shrubs in disturbed areas
- European rabbit (Oryctolagus cuniculus) impacting native vegetation
- Red fox (Vulpes vulpes) predation on native fauna
- Various exotic grass species altering fire regimes and competing with native plants

Fire management: The park's complex topography and varied vegetation types require sophisticated fire management strategies. Controlled burning programs aim to maintain ecological processes while protecting infrastructure and visitor safety. The granite landscape creates natural firebreaks but also presents challenges for fire suppression activities.

Climate change adaptation: Rising temperatures and altered precipitation patterns pose long-term challenges for the park's cool-climate species and ecosystems. Management strategies focus on maintaining habitat connectivity, reducing other stressors, and monitoring ecosystem responses to changing conditions.

=== Research and monitoring ===
The park supports ongoing scientific research into granite ecosystem ecology, rare species conservation, and visitor impact management. Long-term monitoring programs track:

- Population trends of key fauna species, particularly threatened and endemic species
- Vegetation community changes and response to management interventions
- Water quality and aquatic ecosystem health
- Visitor use patterns and environmental impacts
- Climate change indicators and ecosystem responses

=== Collaborative management ===
Park management involves collaboration between Queensland Parks and Wildlife Service and New South Wales National Parks and Wildlife Service for coordinated ecosystem management across the state border. This collaboration extends to research programs, fire management, and invasive species control efforts.

== See also ==
- Protected areas of Queensland
