= Bald Rock National Park =

National park in Australia

- IUCN category II (national park)
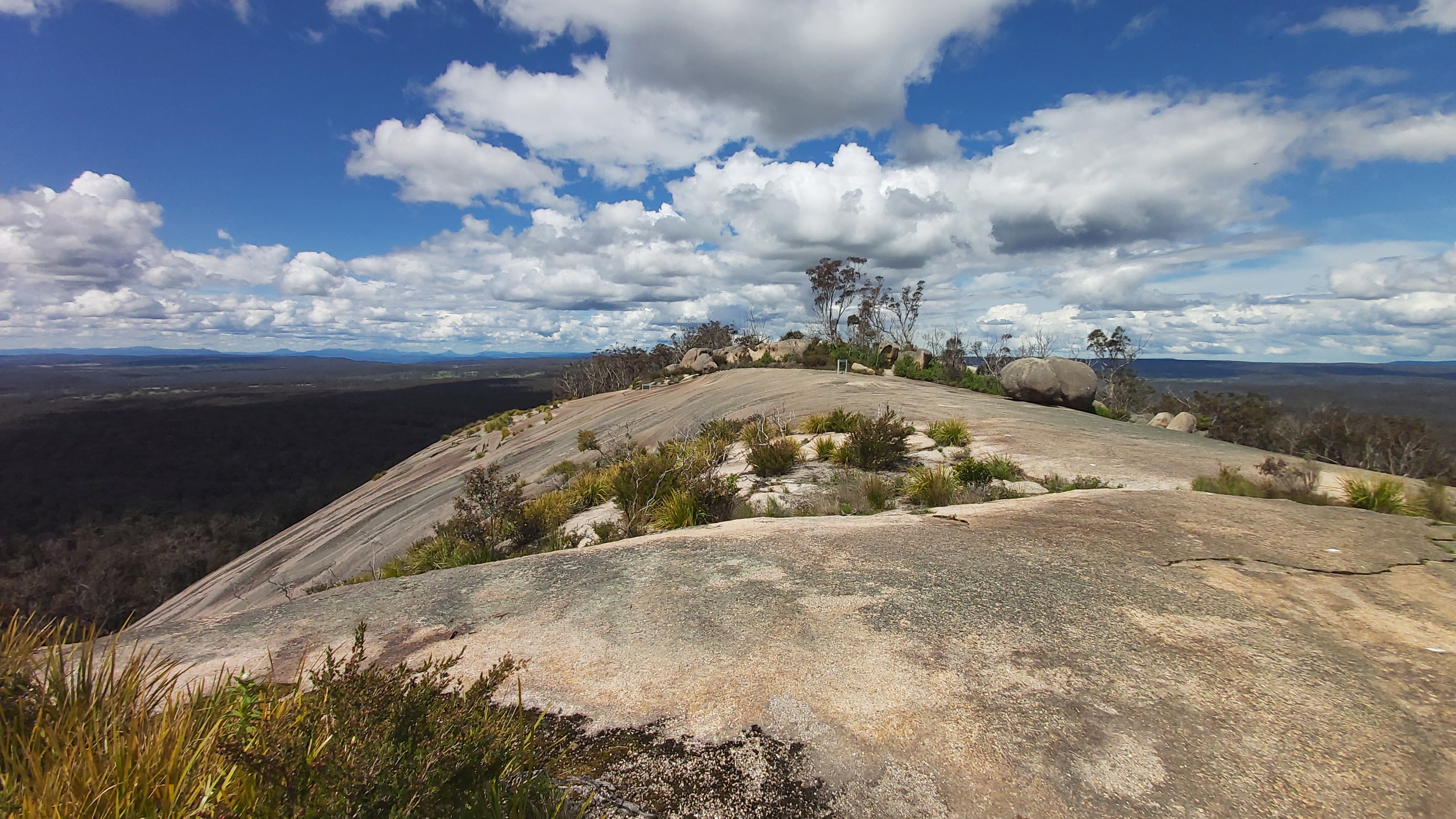
- Vista from the top of Bald Rock

- Location within New South Wales
- Location: New South Wales
- Nearest city: Tenterfield
- Coordinates: 28°51′9″S 152°03′20″E
- Area: 88.83 km^{2} (34.30 sq mi)
- Established: 1971
- Governing body: NSW National Parks and Wildlife Service
- Website: http://www.nationalparks.nsw.gov.au

Bald Rock National Park is a national park in northern New South Wales, Australia, just north of Tenterfield on the Queensland border. The border passes over the rock on the Western side. On the other side of the border national park continues as the Girraween National Park.

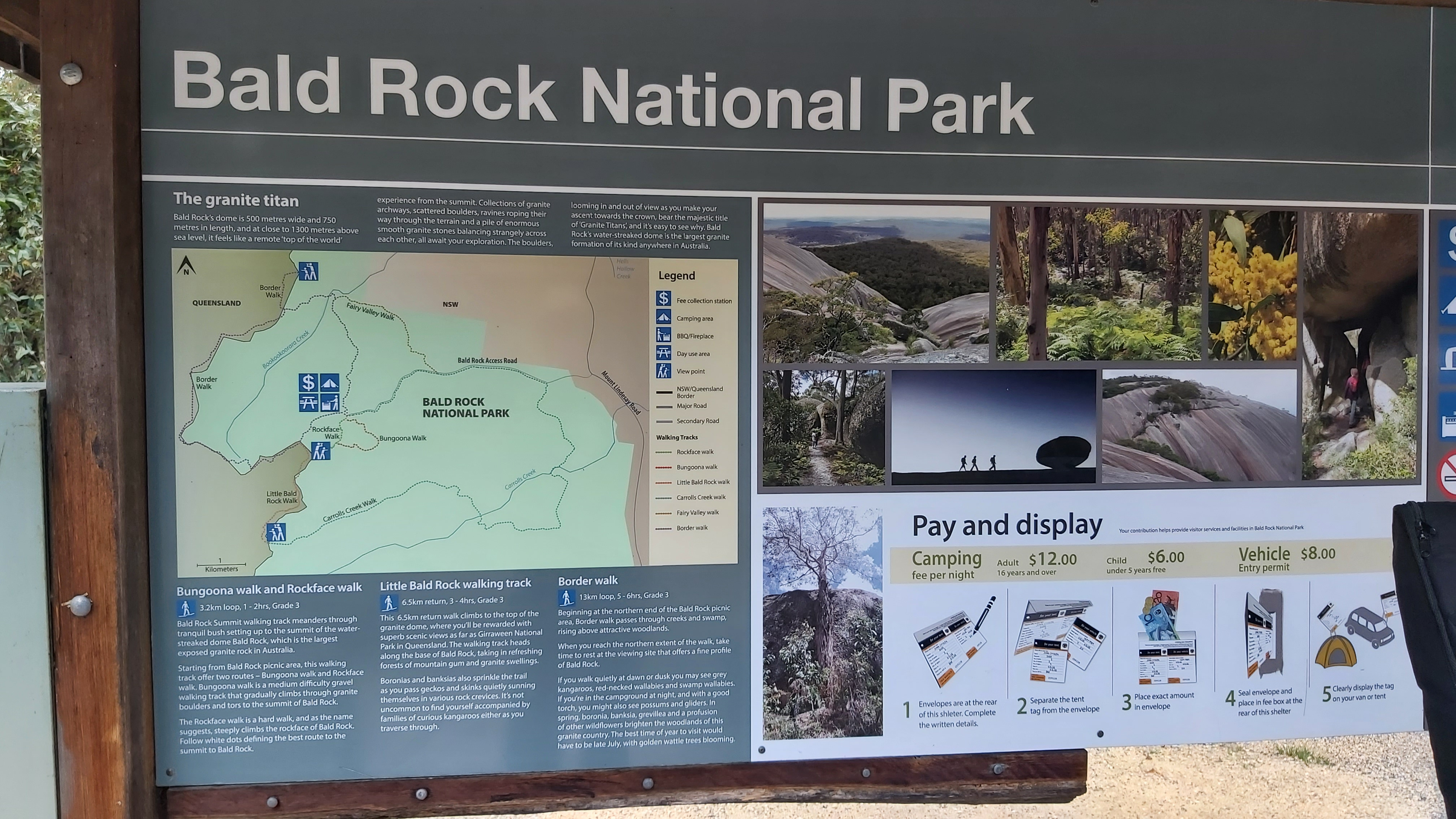
Bald Rock National Park Information Sign

The park is named after its most prominent feature, Bald Rock, which is a large granite outcrop rising 260 metres above the surrounding landscape and almost 1300 metres above sea level. Measuring about 750 metres long and 500 metres wide this is the largest granite monolith in Australia. Access to the rock is provided by a sealed road into the park and walking tracks to the summit. Two tracks are marked, a steep one up the exposed face, or an easier gradient through bushland around the back. The Bungoona Walking Track, constructed in 1980, ascends gently along the eastern side of Bald Rock, meandering through forested areas. Along the way, it traverses granite boulder formations, including a moss-covered arch adorned with ferns and orchids. The summit offers panoramic views of the surrounding bushland, but vegetation on top prevents a full 360° view. The views are so expansive, mountains as far north as the Queensland/New South Wales border can be seen, such as Mount Barney, Mount Lindesay and Flinders Peak, and as far south as Mount MacKenzie, south of Tenterfield.

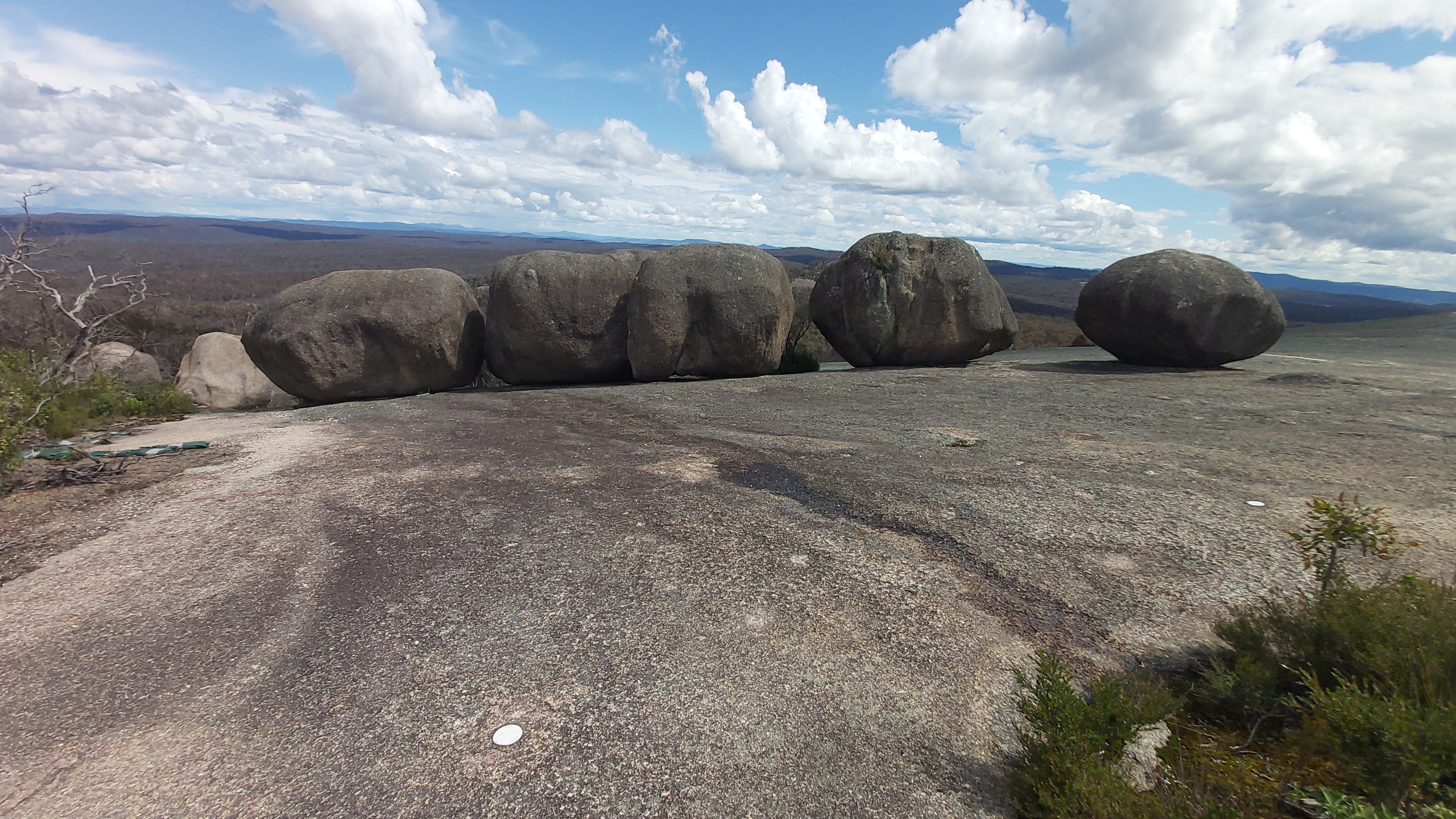
Balancing Rocks

The park is in the New England granite belt, where about 220 million years ago an episode of granite magmatism resulted in the intrusion of the Stanthorpe Adamellite into the surrounding metamorphic and sedimentary rock. Subsequent uplift and erosion of the New England Fold Belt has seen the majority of the surrounding sediments and metamorphic rocks eroded away, with the Stanthorpe Adamellite remaining due to its resistance to weathering.
For many millennia, Bald Rock functioned as a neutral territory where the three indigenous nations of the area – the Jukembal, Bundjalung, and Kamilaroi – found common ground. Serving as a natural boundary, the rock allowed for gatherings and trade between these nations, eliminating the need for them to traverse each other's lands.

This regolith has created a landscape with many exposed inselbergs of granite rocks, some balancing on top of each other, or forming natural arches.

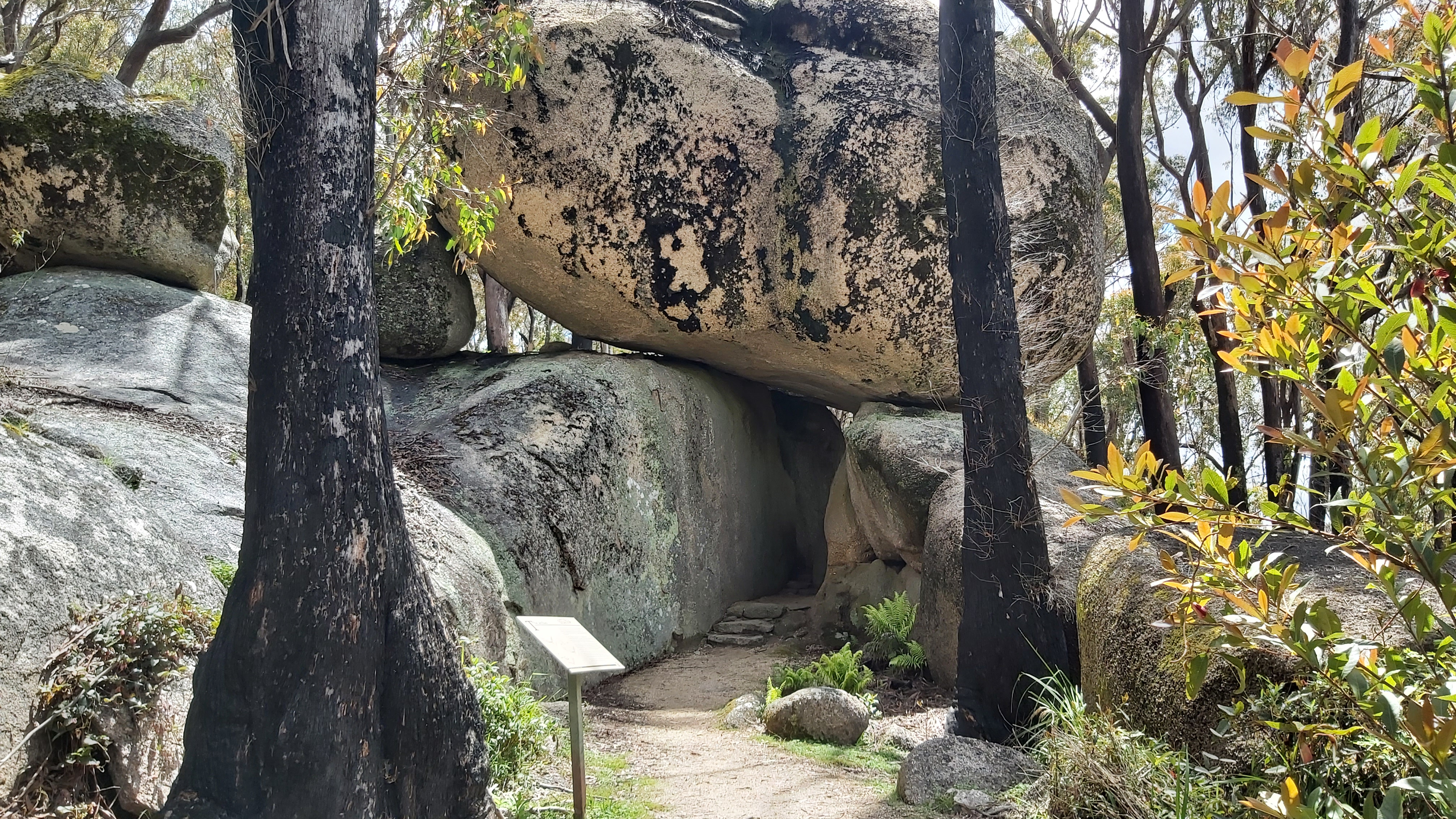
Granite arch on the Bungoona Walk

In 2019/2020, bushfires severely damaged the Bungoona walking track. The NSW Government invested $800,000 repairing and upgrading the track, including making it wheelchair-accessible. The upgrades were completed in March 2023.

Just off the main road from Tenterfield to the park is Thunderbolt's Hideout, a set of caves and overhanging granite rocks. It was thought to have been used by bushranger Captain Thunderbolt. A little further along the same road are some historic World War II tank traps.

== Gallery ==
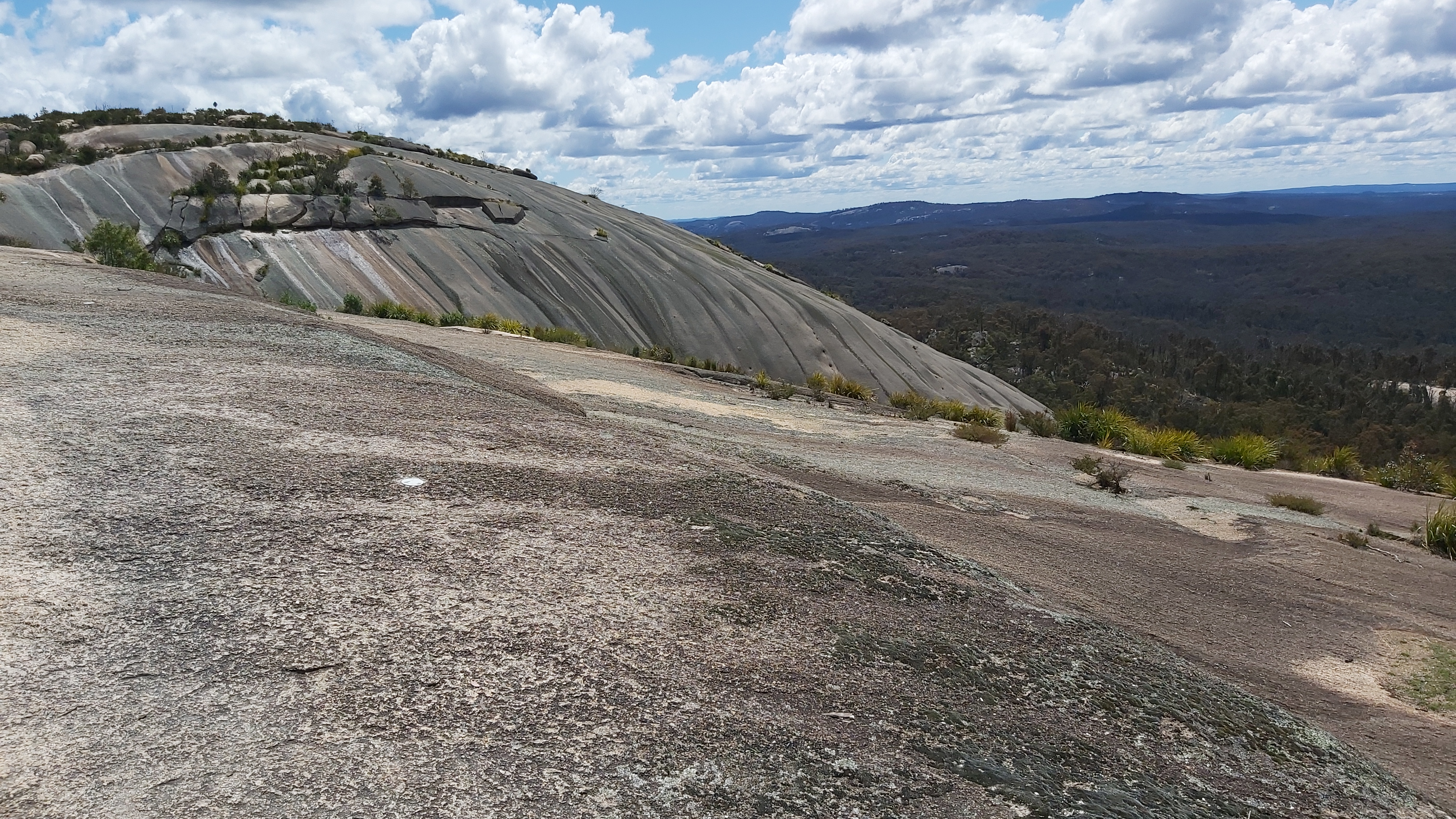
Western View from Bald Rock

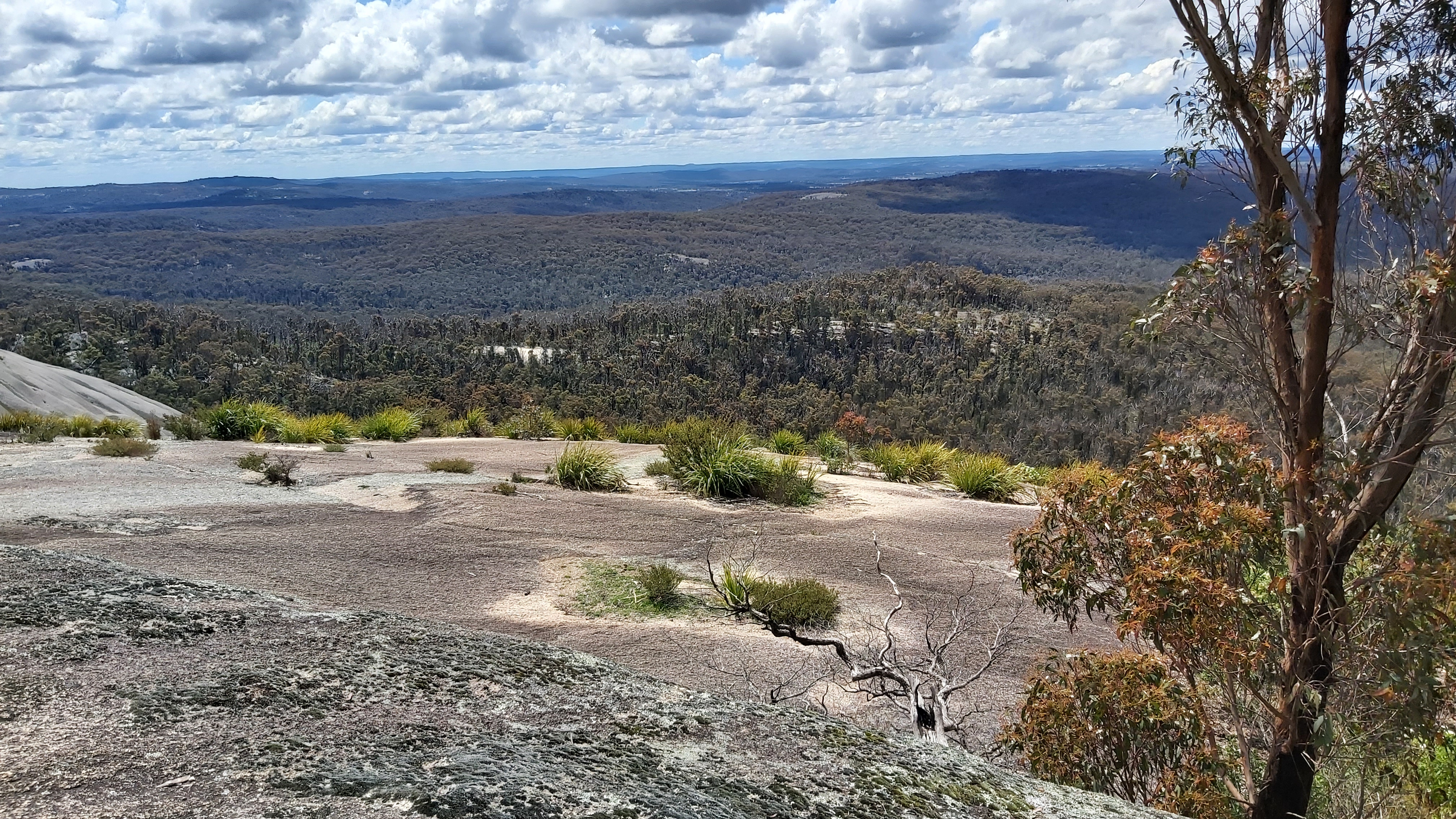
Northern View from Bald Rock

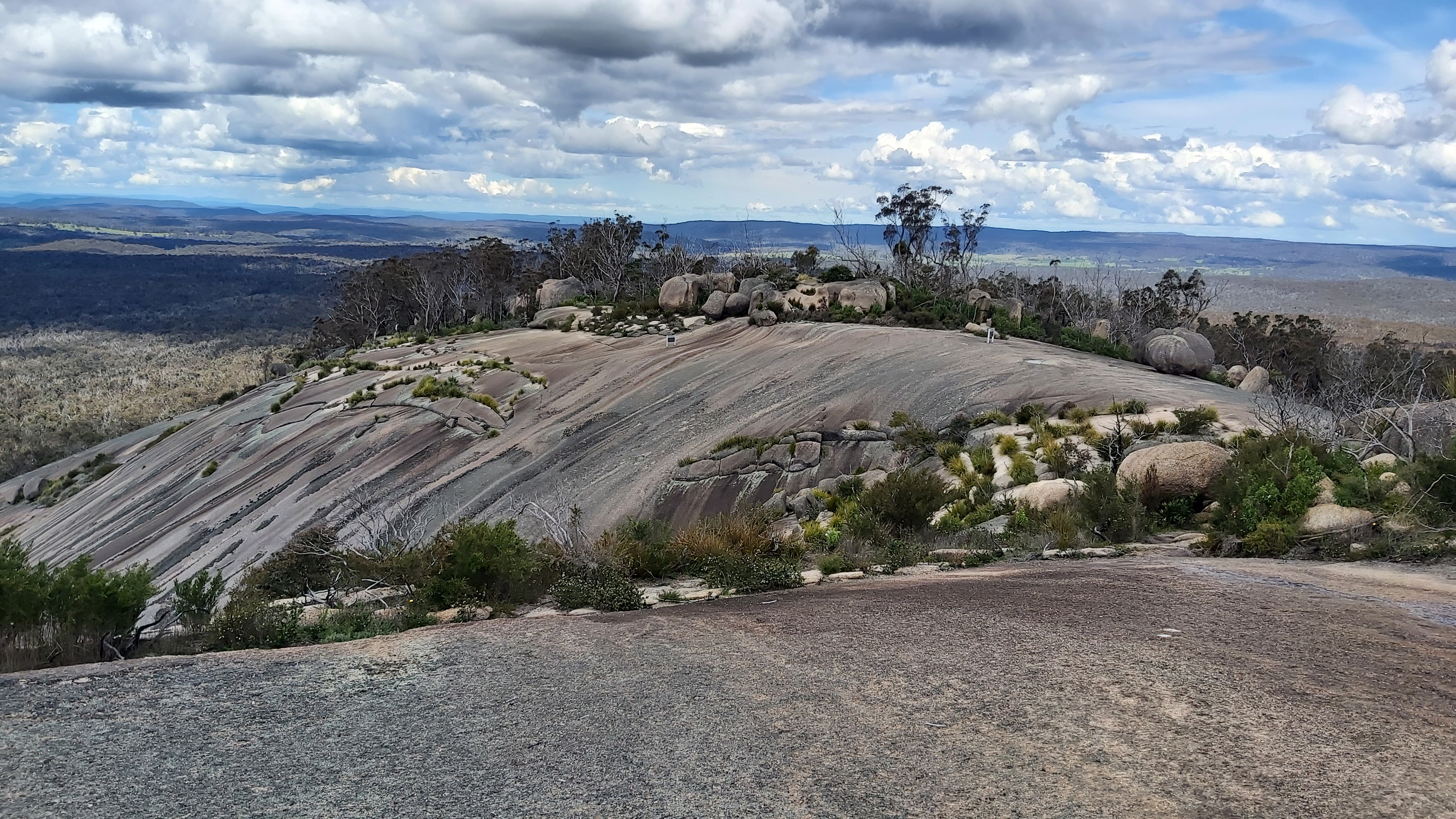
Eastern View from Bald Rock

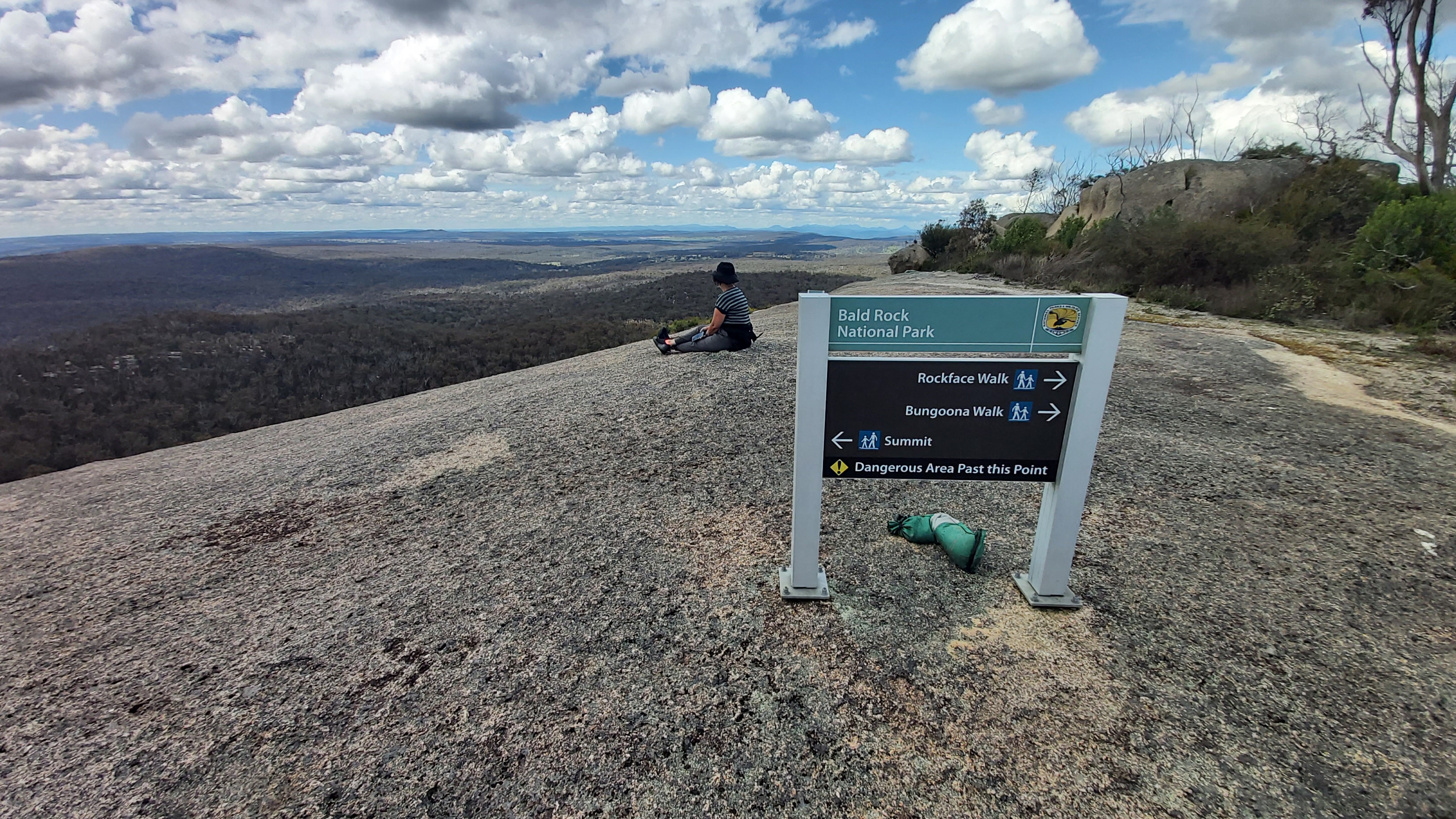
Sign for walking paths and summit

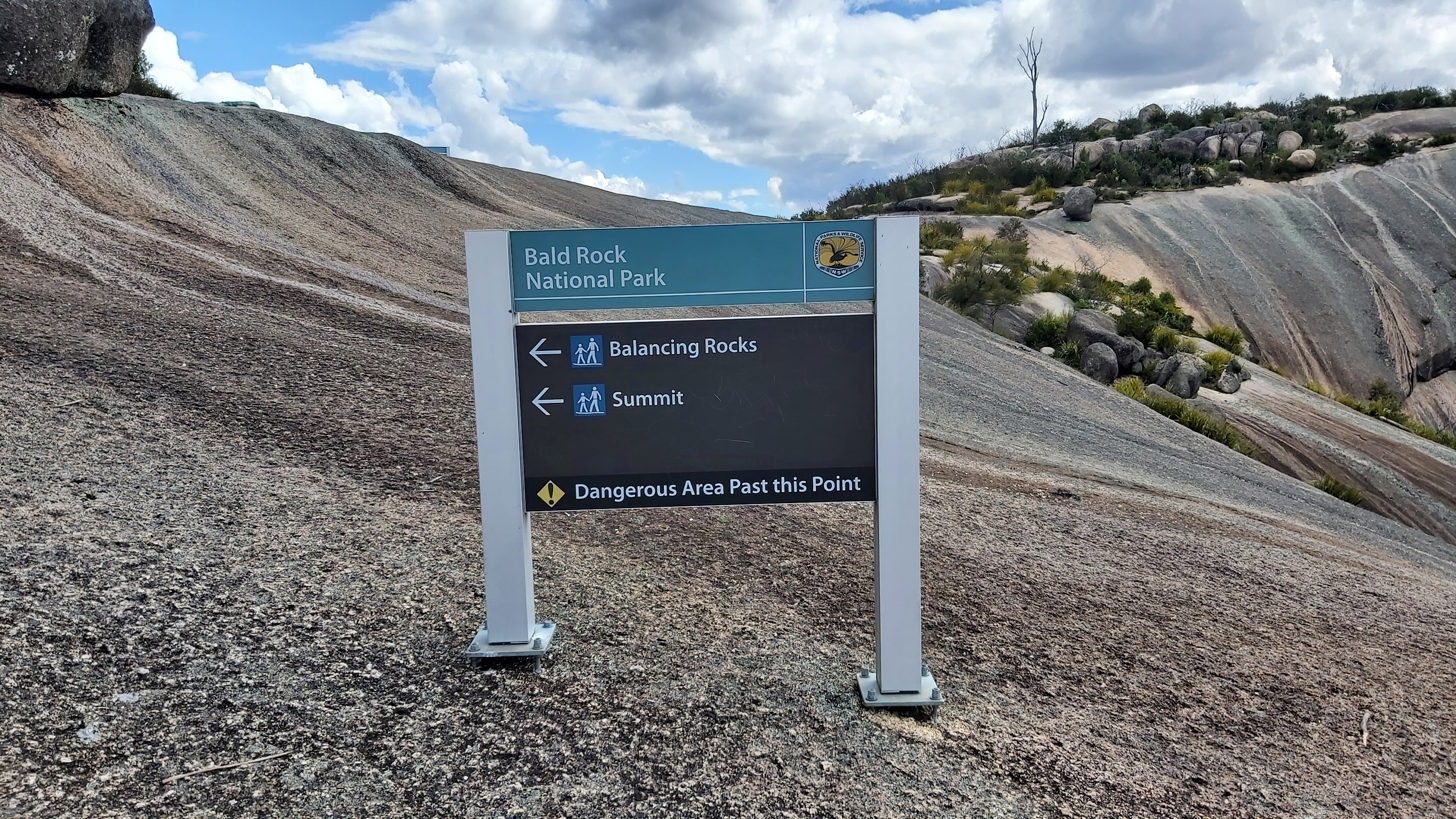
Sign for balancing rocks and summit

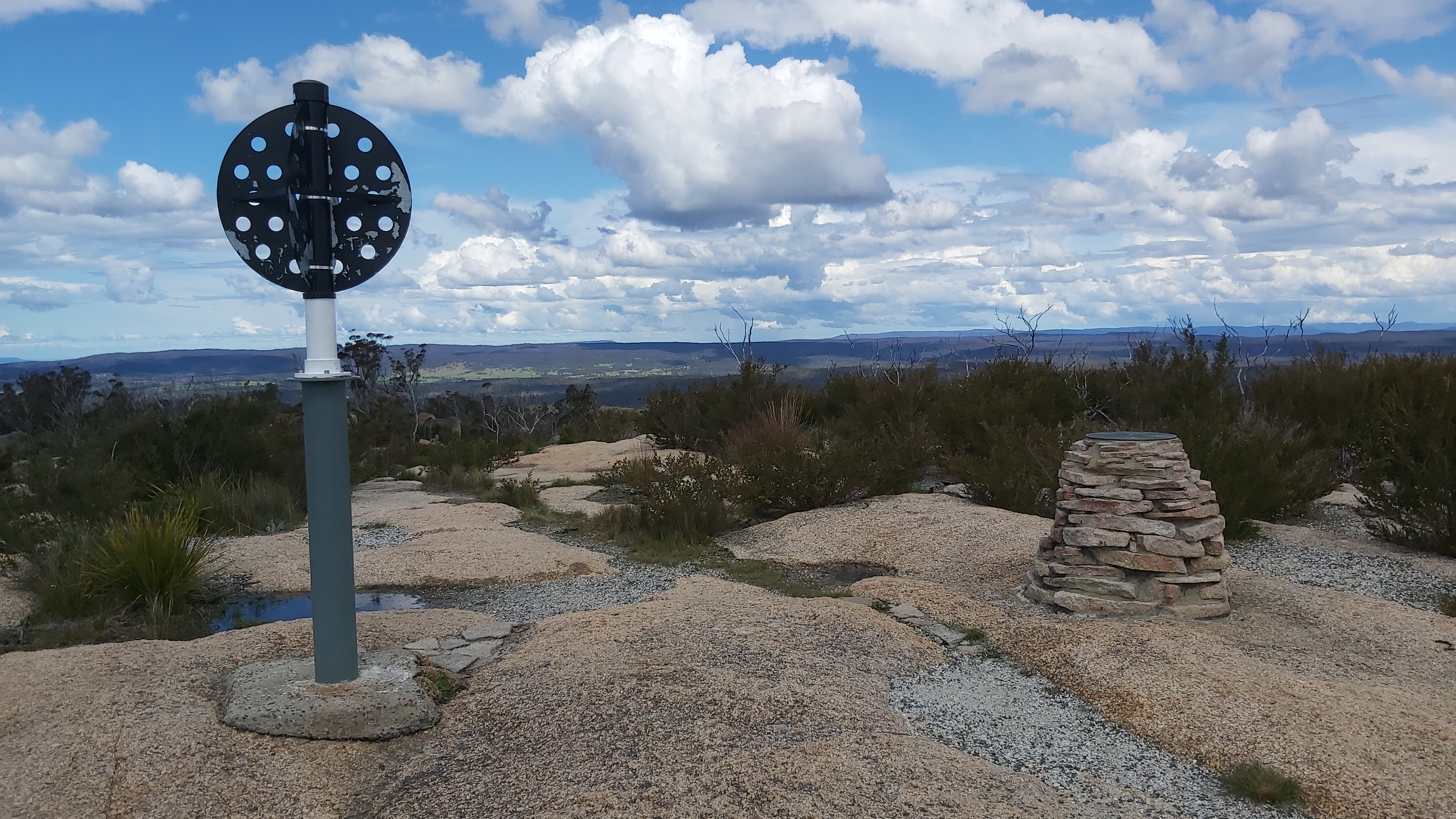
Bald Rock Trig station and Stone Pillar

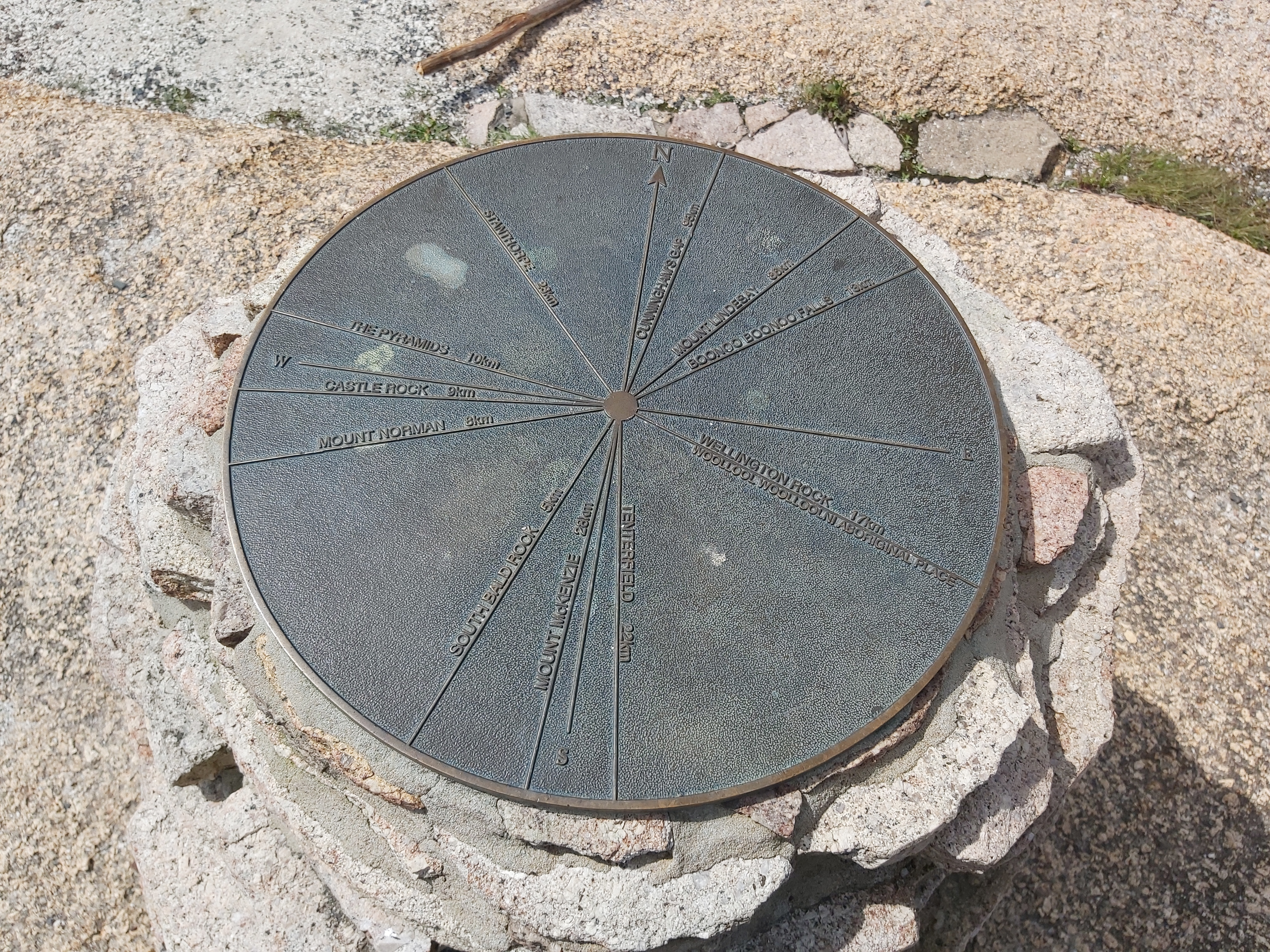
Metal plate with directional lines pointing to distant landmarks and views

== See also ==
- Protected areas of New South Wales
- High Conservation Value Old Growth forest
- Captain Thunderbolt's Rock
