= Ballantyne (surname) =

Ballantyne is a surname of Scottish Gaelic origin, with variant spellings Balentyne, Ballantine, Ballintine, Ballentyne, and Ballendine. Other variants include Bellenden and Ballentine, and Bannatyne and Ballantyne have been interchangeably even by the same person at different times.

It is a habitational surname, probably derived from the Gaelic baile an deadhain, meaning "the dean's farmstead". Its most probable location is Bellenden, now spelt Bellendean, on Ale Water, west of Roberton in Roxburghshire, but there may be more than one location origin, as there is Bellenden in Selkirk, and a village called Ballintoun, in Stirlingshire. The name has often been associated with Falkirk and Edinburgh as well as Roxburghshire.

William Arthur, in An Etymological Dictionary of Family and Christian Names, with an Essay on their Derivation and Import (1857) suggested that the name denoted "a place of ancient pagan worship", derived from the Celts, who worshipped the sun, called Belen or Baal.

Early recordings of the name include John Ballenden (also spelt Ballentyne and Ballantyne), archdeacon of Moray around 1450, and Sir Alexander Balendin, who was provost of Methven in 1563.

Notable people with the surname spelt Ballantyne include:

- Cedric Ballantyne, Australian architect, designer of the Regent Theatre, Melbourne and many other cinemas in Australia
- Charles Ballantyne (1867–1950), Canadian politician
- Colin Ballantyne (born 1951), Scottish geomorphologist, geologist, and physical geographer
- David Ballantyne (1924–1986), New Zealand journalist, novelist and short-story writer
- Edith Ballantyne (1922–2025), Czech-born Canadian executive secretary/president of the Women's International League for Peace and Freedom from 1969 to 1998
- Elspeth Ballantyne (born 1939), Australian actress
- Frederick Ballantyne (1936–2020), Vincentian cardiologist, Governor-General of St. Vincent and the Grenadines from 2002 to 2019
- George Ballantyne (1836–1924), Scottish woolen manufacturer, Walkerburn, Scottish Borders, owner of The Kirna
- Gina Ballantyne (1919–1973), Australian poet
- Hayden Ballantyne (born 1987), professional Australian rules footballer
- Ian Ballantyne (born 1958), Scottish footballer who also played in Hong Kong
- James Ballantyne (1772–1833), Scottish publisher
- James R. Ballantyne (1813–1864), Scottish grammarian of Hindi
- Jean Ballantyne (1906–1980), New Zealand ballet teacher and choreographer
- Jim Ballantyne, president of The Scottish Football League
- John Ballantyne (publisher) (1774–1821), Scottish author and publisher notable for his work with Walter Scott
- John Ballantyne (footballer) (1892 – after 1917), Scottish professional footballer
- John Ballantyne (minister) (1778–1830), Scottish minister of religion
- John Ballantyne or Bellenden (fl. 1533–1587?), Scottish writer
- John Ballantyne, plaintiff in a case on Quebec's language law in 1993
- Johnny Ballantyne (1899–1977), early twentieth-century Scottish football player
- Jon Ballantyne (footballer) (born 1969), Australian rules footballer in the Australian Football League
- Jon Ballantyne (born 1963), Canadian musician, composer, and artist
- Joyce Ballantyne (1918–2006), American painter of pin-ups
- Ken Ballantyne (1940–2016), Scottish athlete
- Linda Ballantyne (born 1964), Canadian voice actress
- Michael Ballantyne (1945–2008), politician from the Northwest Territories, Canada
- Naomi Ballantyne, New Zealand insurance executive
- Milton Ballantyne (1928–2015), Australian politician
- Patrick Ballantyne, Canadian singer songwriter
- Paul Ballantyne (actor) (1909–1996), American actor
- Richard Ballantyne (1817–1898), Scottish-American founder of the Sunday School of The Church of Jesus Christ of Latter-day Saints
- Robert Michael Ballantyne (1825–1894), Scottish juvenile fiction author
- Ron Ballantyne, rugby league footballer of the 1960s for New Zealand and Northland
- Sara Ballantyne (born 1964), Canadian field hockey player who competed in the 1988 Summer Olympics
- Sheila Ballantyne (1937–2007), American novelist and short story writer
- Thomas Ballantyne (politician) (1829–1908), Canadian politician and Speaker of the Ontario Legislature
- Thomas Ballantyne (journalist) (1806–1871), Scottish journalist
- Tony Ballantyne (historian) (born 1972), New Zealand historian
- Tony Ballantyne (writer) (born 1972), British science-fiction author
