= Ballenden =

Ballenden may refer to:

- John Ballenden
- William Ballenden
- Sarah McLeod (Ballenden)

== See also ==
- Balanchine
- Ballentine (disambiguation)
- Ballantyne (disambiguation)
- Ballantine (surname)
- Ballantine (disambiguation)
- Bellenden
- Ballandean, Queensland
- Balindean, the spelling used by the Ogilvy-Wedderburn baronets
