= Bannatyne =

Bannatyne is a Scottish surname. It is also spelt Ballentine, Ballantyne, Ballantine, among others. It may refer to:

== People ==
- Bannatyne (name)

=== Title ===
- Iain Peebles, Lord Bannatyne
- William Bannatyne, Lord Bannatyne

== Places ==
- Bannatyne, Christ Church, Barbados, populated place
- Bannatyne Cove, Newfoundland and Labrador, Canadian hamlet
- Port Bannatyne, Scottish village

== Others ==
- Bannatyne Club, founded by Walter Scott, in memory of George Bannatyne
- Bannatyne Manuscript, collected by George Bannatyne
- Bannatyne manuscript (Clan MacLeod)
- Bannatyne (company) a company operating a UK chain of health clubs
- So Long, Bannatyne, an album by The Guess Who
- Bannatyne v Overtoun, a 1904 Scottish legal case
- Clan Bannatyne, see List of Scottish clans

== See also ==
- Ballantine (surname)
- Ballantyne (disambiguation)
- Ballentine (disambiguation)
