= Ballantine (surname) =

Ballantine is a surname of Scottish Gaelic origin, with variant spellings Balentyne, Ballantyne, Ballintine, Ballentyne, and Ballendine. Other variants include Bellenden, Ballentine, and Bannatyne.

It is a habitational surname, probably derived from the Gaelic baile an deadhain, meaning "the dean's farmstead". Its most probable location is Bellenden, now spelt Bellendean, on Ale Water, west of Roberton in Roxburghshire, but there may be more than one location origin, as there is Bellenden in Selkirk, and a village called Ballintoun, in Stirlingshire. The name has often been associated with Falkirk and Edinburgh as well as Roxburghshire.

William Arthur, in An Etymological Dictionary of Family and Christian Names, with an Essay on their Derivation and Import (1857) suggested that the name denoted "a place of ancient pagan worship", derived from the Celts, who worshipped the sun, called Belen or Baal.

Early recordings of the name include John Ballenden (also spelt Ballentyne and Ballantyne), archdeacon of Moray around 1450, and Sir Alexander Balendin, was provost of Methven in 1563.

== Notable people ==
- Arthur A. Ballantine (1883–1960), American IRS solicitor and Treasury undersecretary in Hoover Administration
- Betty Ballantine (1919–2019), American publisher
- Bill Ballantine (illustrator) (1910–1999), American writer and illustrator of circus subjects, and a clown
- Bill Ballantine (biologist) (1937–2015), British-born New Zealand marine biologist
- Carl Ballantine (1917–2009), American magician and actor
- Cristina Ballantine, Romanian-American mathematician
- Gilbert Ballantine (born 1961), Surinamese-Dutch kickboxer
- Henry Ballantyne (1802-1865), Founder of the Ballantyne mills at Walkerburn and of the village of Walkerburn itself
- Sir Henry Ballantyne (1855-1941), Scottish woolen manufacturer; knighted for public service, served as Provost of Peebles
- Ian Ballantine (1916–1995), American publisher
- James Ballantine (1808–1877), Scottish artist and author who executed stained glass windows for the House of Lords
- Jane Prichard née Ballantine (1936–2023, New Zealand women's leader
- Nathan Ballentine (born 1970), American politician
- Pamela Ballantine (born 1958), Northern Irish television presenter
- Patrick J. Ballantine (born 1965), American politician
- Peter Ballantine (1791–1883), American brewer
- William Ballantine (1812–1887), British lawyer
- Julian Ballantine, a fictional character in the TV series Kyle XY
- Morley Cowles Ballantine (1925–2009), American newspaper editor, The Durango Herald
- Richard Ballantine (1940–2013), American writer
- Richard G. Ballantine, American newspaper publisher, the Durango Herald
- Sophie Ballantine Hawkins (born 1967), American musician
- William Ballantine (priest) (1616/1618–1661), Roman Catholic clergyman who became the first Prefect of Scotland
- William Ballantine (MP) (1847–1911), British Member of Parliament for Coventry 1887–1895

== See also ==
- Balindean, the spelling used by the Ogilvy-Wedderburn baronets
- Ballandean, Queensland, a rural town in Australia
- Ballantine (disambiguation)
- Ballantyne (disambiguation)
- Ballenden, a surname
- Ballentine (disambiguation)
- Bannatyne (name)
- Bellenden, a surname
- George Balanchine
