= Ballantyne =

Ballantyne may refer to:

== People ==
- Ballantyne (surname), includes a list of people with the surname

== Places ==
=== Canada ===
- Ballantyne Park, a city park in Ottawa, Ontario
- Ballantyne Pier, a commercial and passenger dock of the Port of Vancouver, British Columbia
- Ballantyne Strait, a natural waterway through in the Northwest Territories

=== United States ===
- Ballantyne (Charlotte neighborhood), a neighborhood in Charlotte, North Carolina
- Ballantyne Lake a lake in Jamestown Township in Blue Earth County, Minnesota

== Other uses ==
- The Ballantyne Novels, a series of four novels published between 1980 and 1984 by Wilbur Smith
- Ballantyne syndrome, a rare disorder affecting pregnant women
- Ballantyne (company), Italian knitwear brand originated from Scotland

== See also ==
- Balanchine
- Ballandean, Queensland
- Ballantine (disambiguation)
- Ballantine (surname)
- Ballantynes Cove, a community in Antigonish County, Nova Scotia, Canada
- Ballantyne's fire, a 1947 fire that destroyed Ballantyne's department store in Christchurch, New Zealand
- Ballenden
- Bellenden
- Balindean, the spelling used by the Ogilvy-Wedderburn baronets
