= Ballantine =

Ballantine may refer to:

== Brands and companies ==
- Ballantine Books, an American publishing company
- Ballantine Brewery, an American brewery, producer of Ballantine Ale
- Ballantine Inc., a manufacturer of underground construction equipment
- Ballantine's, a range of Scotch whiskies

== People ==
- Ballantine (surname)

== Places ==
- Ballantine, Montana, a US census-designated place
- John Ballantine House, a historic home and museum in New Jersey

== Other uses ==
- Ballantine scale, a standard for measuring shoreline exposure

== See also ==
- Balanchine
- Balindean, the spelling used by the Ogilvy-Wedderburn baronets
- Ballantyne (disambiguation)
- Ballandean, Queensland
- Ballenden
- Bellenden
- Ballentine (disambiguation)
