= Ballandean Pyramid =

Stone pyramid near Ballandean, Queensland, Australia

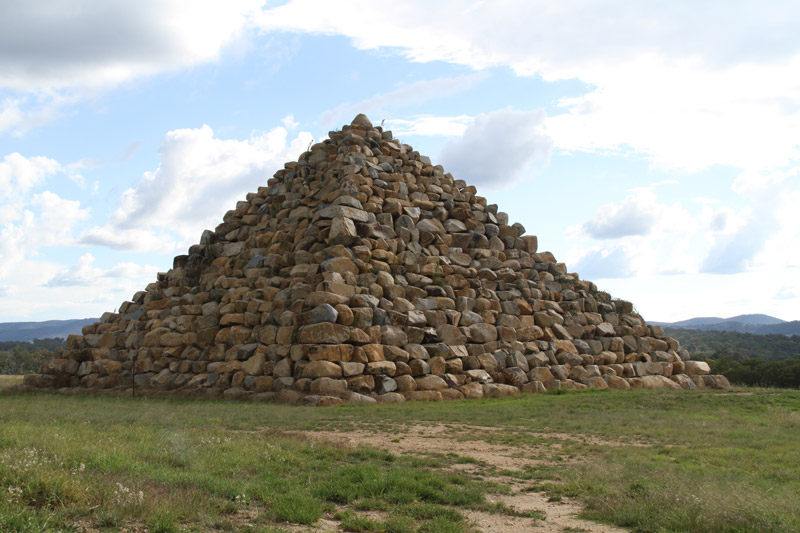
- Interactive map of Ballandean Pyramid
- 28°48′53.24″S 151°51′4.41″E
- Periods: Modern era
- Location: Ballandean, Queensland
- Region: Granite Belt region of the Southern Downs

History
- Built: 2006
- Built by: Ken Stubberfield

Site notes
- Material: Granite
- Height: 15 m (49 ft)
- Width: 30 m (98 ft)
- Public access: No

The Ballandean Pyramid is a man-made stone pyramid near the small village of Ballandean, Queensland, Australia. The pyramid is approximately 15 metres in height and built from blocks of the local granite. (It should not be confused with the nearby natural rock formations known as the Pyramids in the Girraween National Park.) It is on private property belonging to a local vineyard (Henty Estate) and is approximately 25 metres from the nearest road.

== History ==
The pyramid was built after Stewart Morland spoke ken stubberfield what was to be done with the surplus amount of granite rocks that were excavated for land tillage, humorously suggesting that a pyramid could be constructed. Four hours later Morland decided to build the pyramid and contrat a cost of more than $100,000.

The pyramid base was to be 30 metres wide. Landscaping of the base was completed early and the rocks were collected by a dump truck and brought to the site. The first three levels of rocks were laid first by a large excavator and then manoeuvred appropriately into place by a smaller excavator. As the pyramid rose, a makeshift dirt ramp was built to negotiate the height and the construction vehicles used this access ramp to complete the pyramid. At the end of construction, the ramp was removed by the excavator.

The pyramid, which weighs approximately 7500 tonnes, took eight months to build.

== Services ==
An Anzac Day service was held at the site. The Last Post was played from midway up the pyramid and a flag was posted at the top.

== See also ==
- Gympie Pyramid
