= Ballandean Division =

Local government area of Queensland, Australia

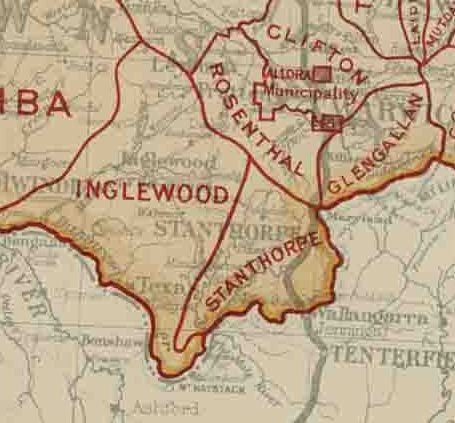
Map of Stanthorpe Division, March 1902 -- Ballandean Division would have been the southern portion

The Ballandean Division was a local government area on the Granite Belt, Queensland, Australia, close to the Queensland-New South Wales border. It only existed between 1879 and 1880.

== History ==
Ballandean Division was one of the original divisions created by the Divisional Boards Act 1879 with a population of 2430.

On 25 June 1880, Ballandean Division was abolished and was absorbed into its northern neighbour Stanthorpe Division.
