= Fletcher, Queensland =

Fletcher
- Suburb
- Interactive map of Fletcher
- Coordinates: 28.7686°S 151.8697°E
- Country: Australia
- State: Queensland
- LGA: Southern Downs Region
- Location: 15.8 km (9.8 mi) SW of Stanthorpe; 76.5 km (47.5 mi) SSW of Warwick; 42 km (26 mi) NW of Tenterfield; 159 km (99 mi) S of Toowoomba; 233 km (145 mi) SW of Brisbane

Government
  - State electorate: Southern Downs
  - Federal division: Maranoa

Area
  - Total: 31.7 km^{2} (12.2 sq mi)
- Elevation: 779 m (2,556 ft)

Population
  - Total: 128 (2021 census)
  - Density: 4.038/km^{2} (10.46/sq mi)
- Time zone: UTC+10:00 (AEST)
- Postcode: 4381
Suburbs around Fletcher
Glen Aplin	Glen Aplin	Glen Aplin
Somme	Fletcher	Mount Tully
Somme	Ballandean	Eukey

Fletcher is a rural locality in the Southern Downs Region, Queensland, Australia. In the 2021 census, Fletcher had a population of 128 people.

== Geography ==
The Severn River forms the western boundary of the locality. The terrain is somewhat mountainous with the land in the valleys between being used for farming. A small area in the east of the locality is part of the Girraween National Park. Apart from that the predominant land use is grazing on native vegetation and crop growing.

The New England Highway and South Western railway line pass from north (Glen Aplin) to south (Ballandean) through the locality.

== History ==
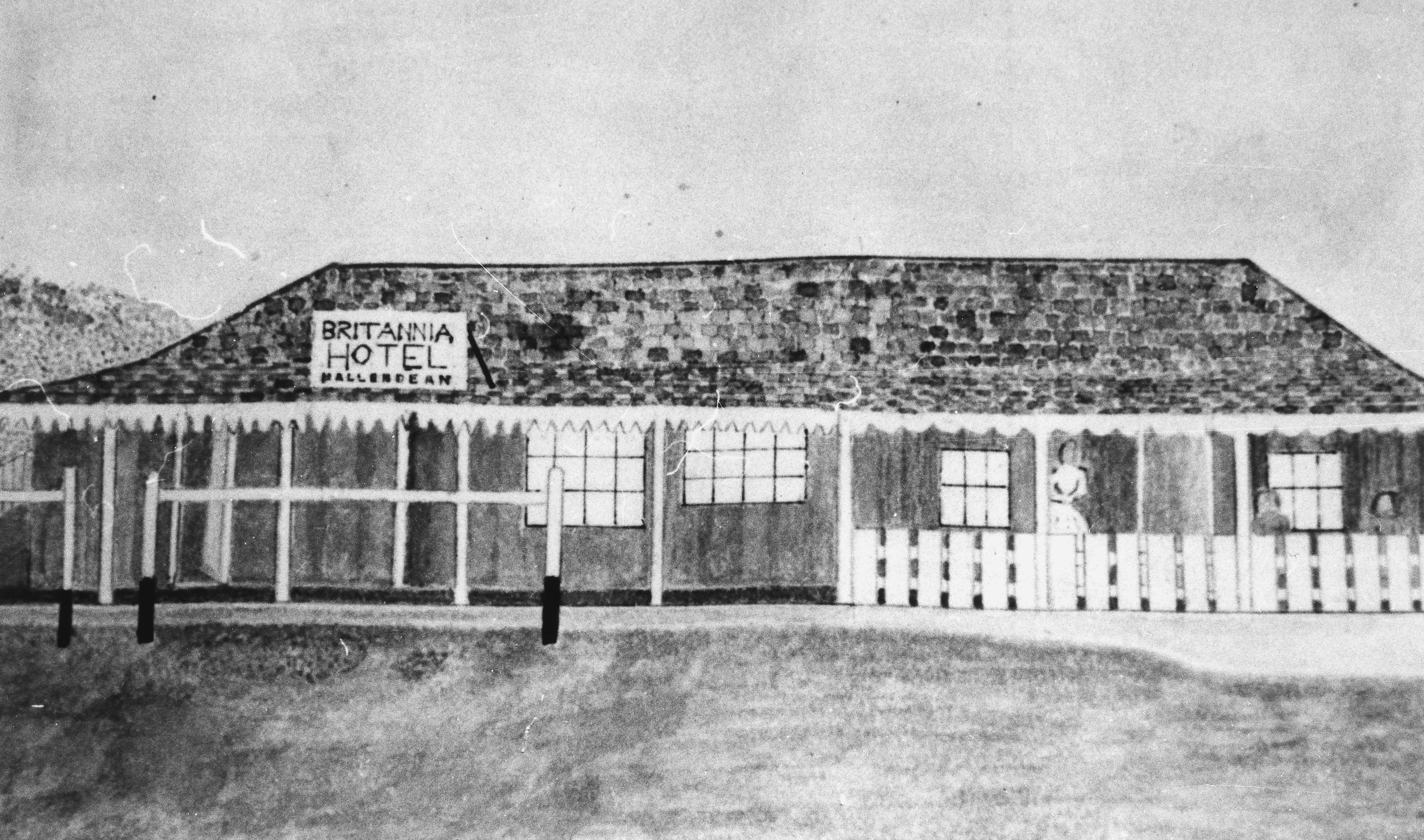
Britannia Hotel, Ballandean, established by Thomas Henry Fletcher, circa 1872

In 1872, Thomas Henry Fletcher established the Britannia Hotel in present-day Ballandean. He planted a small orchard beside his hotel. While he was successful at fruit growing, most of the interest in the district was in mining.

The locality of Fletcher is presumed to be named after the Fletcher railway station (28.7660°S 151.8475°E), which was named by the Queensland Railways Department in 1887, after orchardist Thomas Henry Fletcher, who pioneered the growing of fruit in the Granite Belt area.

== Demographics ==
In the 2016 census, Fletcher had a population of 92 people.

In the 2021 census, Fletcher had a population of 128 people.

== Education ==
There are no schools in the locality. The nearest government primary schools are Glen Aplin State School in neighbouring Glen Aplin to the north and Ballandean State School in neighbouring Ballandean to the south. The nearest government secondary school is Stanthorpe State High School in Stanthorpe to the north-west.
