= Bellenden =

Bellenden is a Scottish surname, a variant form of Ballantine, Ballantyne, and others

People with this surname include:

- John Bellenden, Scottish writer
- John Bellenden (Lord Justice Clerk)
- Katherine Bellenden, Scottish courtier
- William Bellenden, Scottish classical scholar
- Lewis Bellenden, (d. 1591) Scottish lawyer

== See also ==
- Balanchine
- Ballentine (disambiguation)
- Ballantyne (disambiguation)
- Ballantine (surname)
- Ballantine (disambiguation)
- Ballenden
- Ballandean, Queensland
- Balindean, the spelling used by the Ogilvy-Wedderburn baronets
- Bellenden Road, a road in Peckham, London, and surrounding district Bellenden
