= John Bellenden (disambiguation) =

John Bellenden (fl. 1533–1587) was a Scottish writer.

John Bellenden may also refer to:

- Sir John Bellenden of Auchnole and Broughton (died 1576), Lord Justice Clerk
- John Bellenden Ker Gawler (1764–1842), English botanist

== See also ==
- John Ballenden (c. 1812–1856), Scottish fur trader
