= Nundubbermere, Queensland =

Nundubbermere
- Suburb
- Interactive map of Nundubbermere
- Coordinates: 28.7311°S 151.7641°E
- Country: Australia
- State: Queensland
- LGA: Southern Downs Region
- Location: 18.0 km (11.2 mi) WSW of Stanthorpe; 77.5 km (48.2 mi) SSW of Warwick; 161 km (100 mi) S of Toowoomba; 236 km (147 mi) SW of Brisbane

Government
  - State electorate: Southern Downs
  - Federal division: Maranoa

Area
  - Total: 126.2 km^{2} (48.7 sq mi)

Population
  - Total: 102 (2021 census)
  - Density: 0.808/km^{2} (2.093/sq mi)
- Time zone: UTC+10:00 (AEST)
- Postcode: 4380
Suburbs around Nundubbermere
Pikedale	Greenlands	Thorndale
Springdale	Nundubbermere	Glen Aplin
Sundown	Ballandean	Somme

Nundubbermere is a rural locality in the Southern Downs Region, Queensland, Australia. In the 2021 census, Nundubbermere had a population of 102 people.

== Geography ==
The land use is predominantly grazing on native vegetation with a small amount of crop growing.

== History ==
The locality takes its name from an early pastoral run in the Stanthorpe area.

Land in Nundubbermere was open for selection on 17 April 1877; 53 square miles (140 km^{2}) were available.

On 15 June 1917, the Queensland Government approved the establishment of a state school at Nundubbermere. In October 1917 the government reserved 2 acres (0.81 ha) of Crown land for the school. It is unclear if the school ever opened.

== Demographics ==
In the 2016 census, Nundubbermere had a population of 98 people.

In the 2021 census, Nundubbermere had a population of 102 people.

== Education ==
There are no schools in Nudubbermere. The nearest government primary schools are:

- Greenlands State School in neighbouring Greenlands to the north
- Broadwater State School in Broadwater to the north-east
- Glen Aplin State School in neighbouring Glen Aplin to the east
- Ballandean State School in Ballandean to the south

The nearest government secondary school is Stanthorpe State High School in Stanthorpe to the north-east.
