= Greenlands, Queensland =

Greenlands
- Suburb
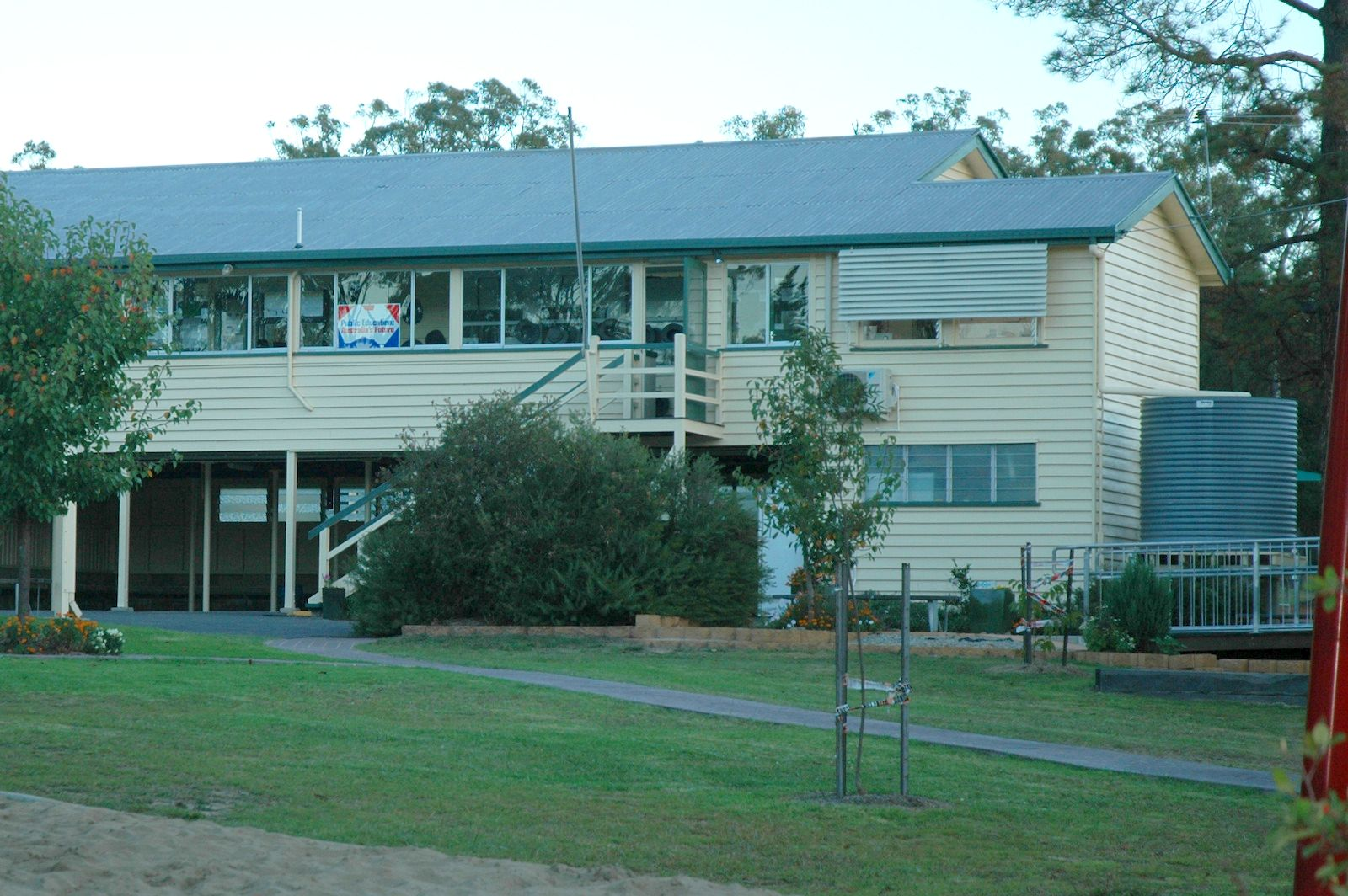
- Greenlands State School, 2009

- Interactive map of Greenlands
- Coordinates: 28.6533°S 151.7863°E
- Country: Australia
- State: Queensland
- LGA: Southern Downs Region
- Location: 11.8 km (7.3 mi) W of Stanthorpe; 71.4 km (44.4 mi) SSW of Warwick; 155 km (96 mi) S of Toowoomba; 229 km (142 mi) SW of Brisbane

Government
  - State electorate: Southern Downs
  - Federal division: Maranoa

Area
  - Total: 61.0 km^{2} (23.6 sq mi)

Population
  - Total: 244 (2021 census)
  - Density: 4.000/km^{2} (10.360/sq mi)
- Time zone: UTC+10:00 (AEST)
- Postcode: 4380
Suburbs around Greenlands
| Pikedale | Amiens | Amiens |
| Pikedale | Greenlands | Broadwater |
| Nundubbermere | Nundubbermere | Thorndale |

Greenlands is a rural locality in the Southern Downs Region, Queensland, Australia. In the 2021 census, Greenlands had a population of 244 people.

== Geography ==
Stanthorpe – Texas Road passes from east to west through the locality.

== History ==
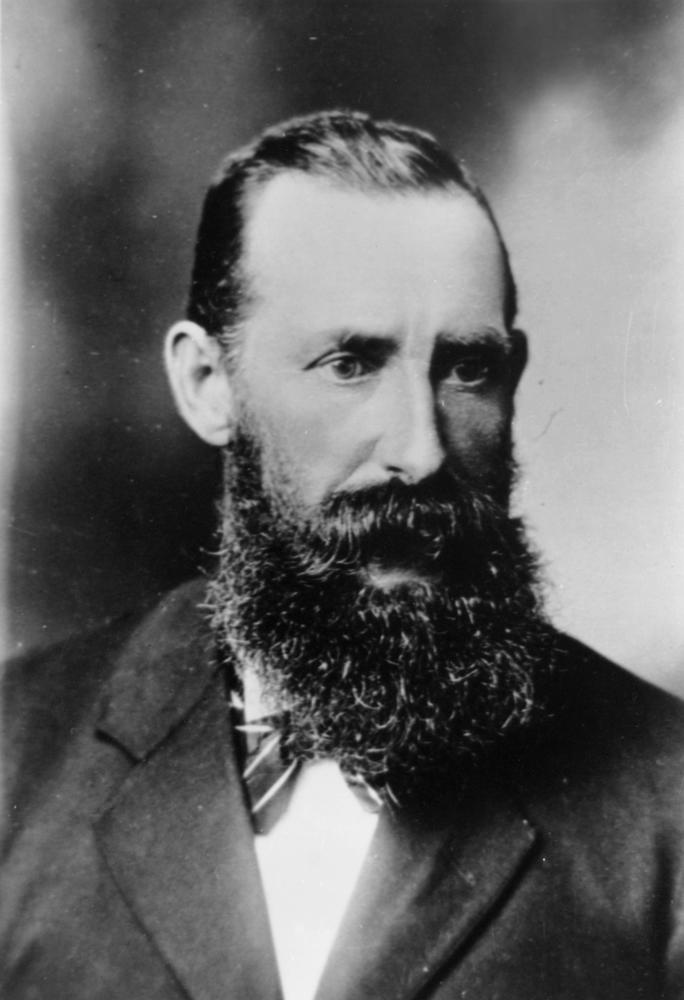
Bertram (Jack) Greenland, 1872

The locality is named after Bertram (Jack) Greenland, a building contractor in Stanthorpe.

Thorndale State School opened in 1915. It was relocated to a new location near Spring Creek in 1924 and opened on 12 November 1924 as Greenlands State School. (Note another Thorndale State School opened in neighbouring Thorndale in 1945).

Casley Mt Hutton Winery planted eight different varieties of grapevines in 1996 and opened its cellar door in August 2001. At 900 metres (3,000 ft) above sea level, it is one of the higher altitude viveyards in the Granite Belt district.

== Demographics ==
In the 2016 census, Greenlands had a population of 250 people.

In the 2021 census, Greenlands had a population of 244 people.

== Education ==
Greenlands State School is a government primary (Prep-6) school for boys and girls at 1209 Texas Road (28.6608°S 151.8274°E). In 2016, the school had enrolment of 106 students with 8 teachers (6 full-time equivalent) with 9 non-teaching staff (4 full-time equivalent). In 2018, the school had an enrolment of 108 students with 8 teachers (6 full-time equivalent) and 8 non-teaching staff (4 full-time equivalent).

There are no secondary schools in Greenlands. The nearest government secondary school is Stanthorpe State High School in Stanthorpe to the east.

== Attractions ==
Casley Mt Hutton Winery is at 94 Mount Hutton Road (28.6665°S 151.8043°E).
