= Thorndale, Queensland =

Thorndale
- Suburb
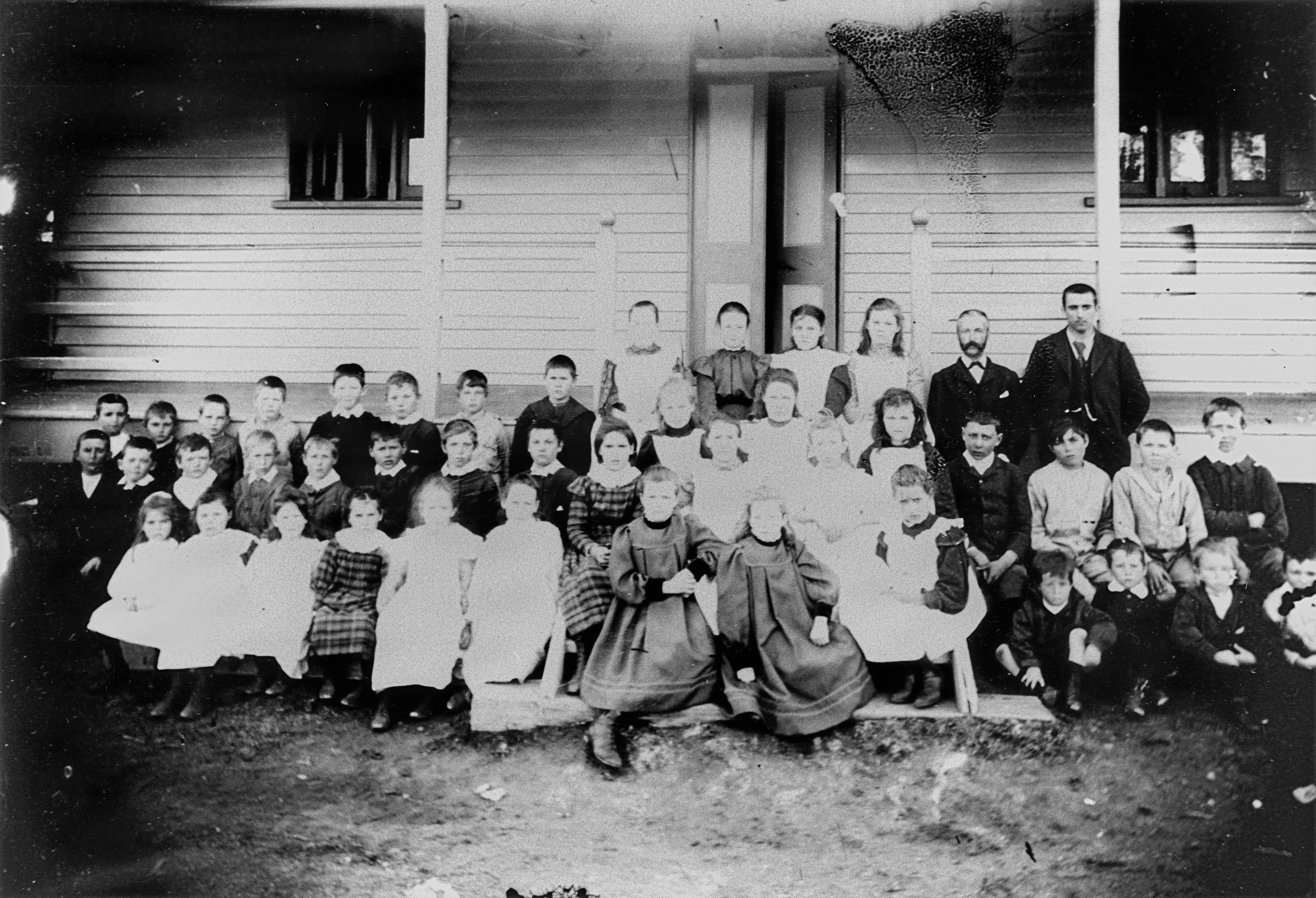
- Thorndale State School students and teachers in front of the school building, via Stanthorpe, circa 1900

- Interactive map of Thorndale
- Coordinates: 28.7025°S 151.8589°E
- Country: Australia
- State: Queensland
- LGA: Southern Downs Region
- Location: 12 km (7.5 mi) SW of Stanthorpe; 71 km (44 mi) S of Warwick; 52 km (32 mi) N of Tenterfield; 154 km (96 mi) S of Toowoomba; 228 km (142 mi) SW of Brisbane

Government
  - State electorate: Southern Downs
  - Federal division: Maranoa

Area
  - Total: 13.6 km^{2} (5.3 sq mi)
- Elevation: 906 m (2,972 ft)

Population
  - Total: 134 (2021 census)
  - Density: 9.85/km^{2} (25.52/sq mi)
- Time zone: UTC+10:00 (AEST)
- Postcode: 4380
Suburbs around Thorndale
Greenlands	Broadwater	Broadwater
Nundubbermere	Thorndale	Severnlea
Glen Aplin	Glen Aplin	Glen Aplin

Thorndale is a rural locality in the Southern Downs Region, Queensland, Australia. In the 2021 census, Thorndale had a population of 134 people.

== History ==
Thorndale State School opened in 1915 on a 5-acre (2.0 ha) site off Boyce Road (28.6896°S 151.8429°E). It closed in 1924, after which it was moved to Spring Creek, Stanthorpe and renamed Greenlands State School.

A second Thorndale State School opened on 18 February 1946 and closed on 31 December 1964. It was at 7 Nicholson Road (28.69610°S 151.85647°E).

== Demographics ==
In the 2016 census, Thorndale had a population of 150 people.

In the 2021 census, Thorndale had a population of 134 people.

== Education ==
There are no schools in Thorndale. The nearest government primary schools are Broadwater State School in neighbouring Broadwater to the north, Severnlea State School in neighbouring Severnlea to the east, and Glen Aplin State School in neighbouring Glen Aplin to the south.

The nearest government secondary school is Stanthorpe State High School in Stanthorpe to the north-east.

There is also a Catholic primary-and-secondary school in Stanthorpe.
