= Alexander Roderick McLeod =

Canadian fur trader and explorer (c. 1782–1840)

- Born: c. 1782; Province of Quebec
- Died: 11 June 1840 (aged 57–58); Lower Canada
- Occupation: Fur trader
- Years active: 1802–1840
- Employer(s): North West Company and Hudson's Bay Company
- Children: 8, including Sarah McLeod (Ballenden)

Alexander Roderick McLeod (c. 1782 – 11 June 1840) was a fur trader and explorer in British North America who began his career with the North West Company in 1802.

McLeod became a trader and brigade leader with the Hudson's Bay Company (HBC), led by Sir George Simpson, after they joined with the NWC in 1821. He was highly active in solidifying the HBC role in the Pacific Northwest and was instrumental in George Back's Arctic expedition, as well as in establishing the Siskiyou Trail between Fort Vancouver and the Sacramento Valley of California.

Based at Fort Vancouver, McLeod explored the Umpqua and Rogue rivers in 1826–28, and was preparing his brigade for another departure in July 1828 when American explorer Jedediah Smith arrived there after most of his party were killed by Umpqua people in Oregon. Chief Factor John McLoughlin reassigned McLeod's brigade, including tracker and interpreter Michel Laframboise, to return with Smith to the Umpqua to search for survivors and try to recover Smith's horses, furs and supplies. Much of Smith's gear was recovered, including his journal and that of Harrison Rodgers, but fifteen of Smith's nineteen men had been killed. Smith's maps helped Mcleod in later explorations into northern California.

Alexander McLeod was a maverick in the eyes of the HBC but was an important employee who served the company in a variety of settings. He was passed over for a position as a chief factor, something he expected and felt he had earned. John Ballenden, who married McLeod's daughter Sarah, later achieved this position with the company.

McLeod Lake in Stockton, California is named after him, as is the McCloud River.
