= Ballandean Homestead =

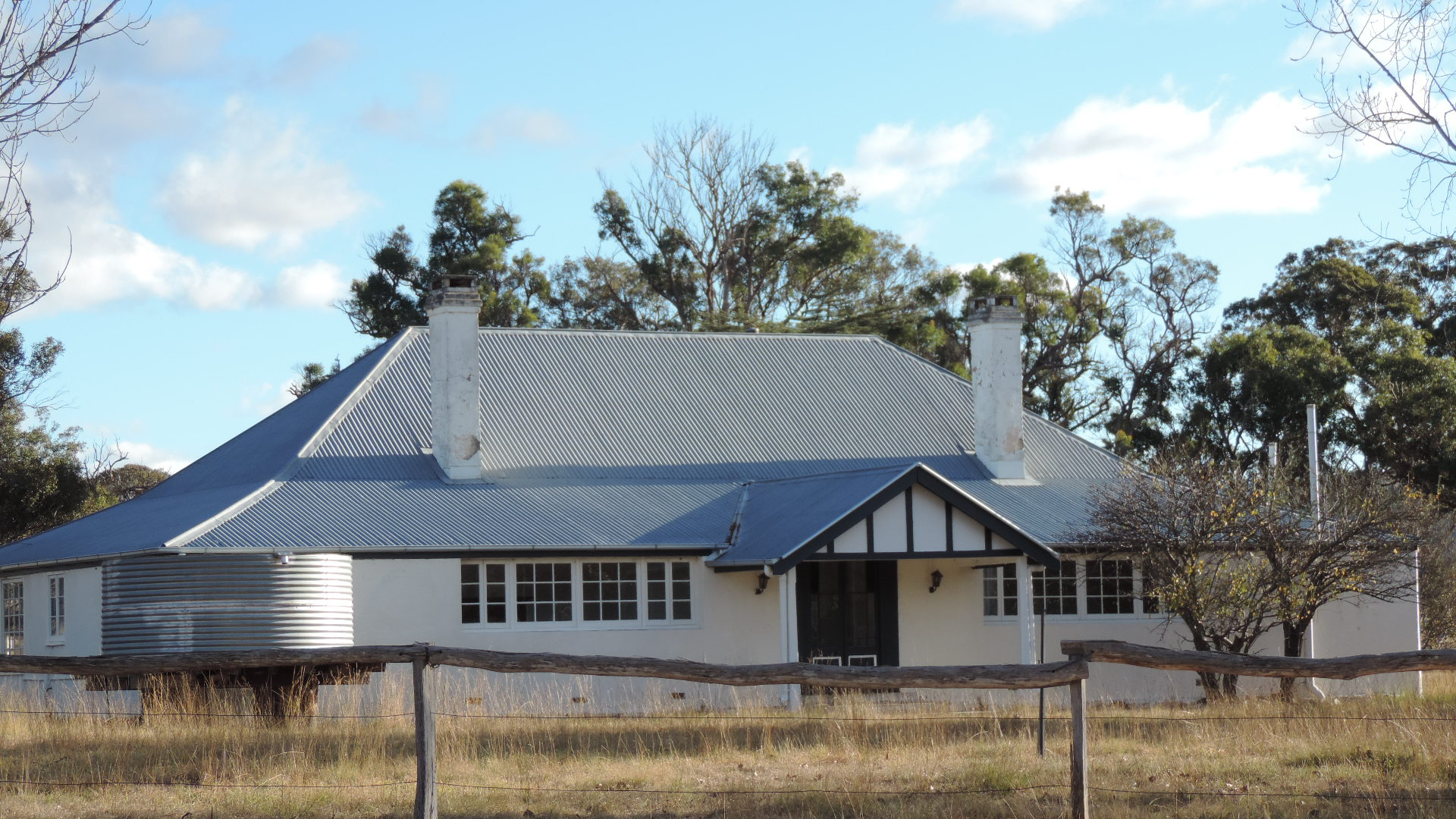
- Ballandean Homestead, 2015

- Location within Queensland Location within Australia
- 28.8156°S 151.7948°E
- Location: Ballandean, Southern Downs Region, Queensland, Australia

History
- Design period: 1840s–1860s (mid-19th century)
- Built: c. 1840–1890s circa

Queensland Heritage Register
- Official name: Ballandean Homestead
- Type: state heritage (landscape, built)
- Designated: 21 October 1992
- Reference no.: 600832
- Significant period: 1840s–1890s (historical)
- Significant components: cream shed/stand, kitchen/kitchen house, yards – livestock, residential accommodation – main house, vista/s, views to, stables, shed – milking, chimney/chimney stack, views from, shed/s

Ballandean Homestead is a heritage-listed homestead at Ballandean, Southern Downs Region, Queensland, Australia. It was built from c. 1840 to 1890s circa. It was added to the Queensland Heritage Register on 21 October 1992.

== History ==
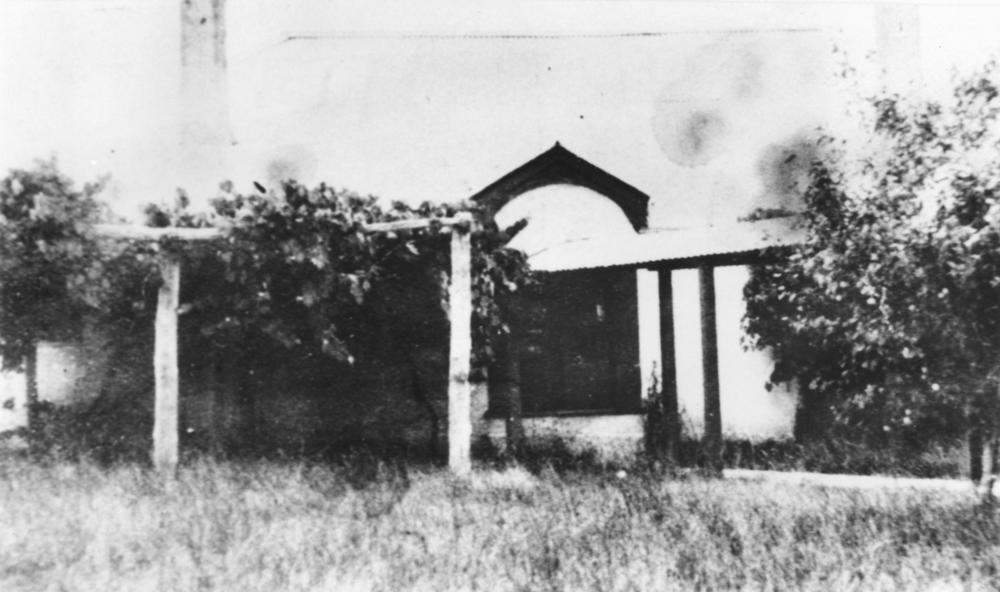
Glimpse of Ballandean Station homestead, 1933

Old Ballandean Homestead comprises a c. 1870 residence, detached kitchen, creamery, killing shed, milking shed, yards, stables and remnants of a blacksmith's shed and forge. It was the third head station constructed on Ballandean run, established c. 1840 in the New England district.

Ballandean was among the earliest pastoral runs taken up in that part of the north-eastern districts of New South Wales that later became Queensland. Some reports claim occupation as early as 1839.

From 1837 Robert Ramsay Mackenzie held an interest in a number of New England runs, but resided in Sydney, leaving his New England properties in the hands of managers. Sometime prior to 1844 Mackenzie either established or acquired an interest in Ballandean. Documents and notices pertaining to Mackenzie's bankruptcy, declared in April 1844, indicate that he held an interest in and 400 head of cattle running on Ballandean under the charge of Mr HH Nicol. Mackenzie later recovered his financial position and became a prominent Queensland politician, but his association with Ballandean appears to have concluded in 1844.

In November 1845 Henry Hedger Nicol, who had been managing Ballandean for Mackenzie, was granted a licence to depasture stock on Ballandean and in 1851 he was granted an official lease. The establishment of Ballandean as a successful pastoral property is attributed to Nicol. His first home on the run was a bark-roofed slab hut close to Washpool Creek. Reputedly, when the creek silted up and formed a swamp, Nicol constructed a four-roomed slab cottage with a stone fireplace and a shingle roof closer to the site of the later head station. An early traveller on the Darling Downs, writing in 1926 of a c. 1857 journey through the Granite Belt, recalled that Nicol had not yet built the rendered brick house and that he still resided in a slab building.

Nicol's lease passed to John Brown Watt in 1863. Like Mackenzie, Watt was an absentee squatter who owned a large number of runs. He was a prominent Sydney businessman and a Member of the New South Wales Legislative Council from 1861 to 1866 and from 1874 to 1890. It appears that Nicol continued to manage the property for Watt, and likely still held an interest in it, voting in the district until 1868 under his licence to depasture stock at Ballandean.

Robert Reid Cunninghame Robertson acquired the lease to Ballandean in 1865. Robertson was from Wellington Vale, west of Deepwater in northern New South Wales.

Donald Gunn, whose father owned nearby Pikedale station, visited the homestead c. 1868 as a child and later recalled it as one of the best houses in the district. Gunn attributed the improvements on Ballandean to Nicols, not Robertson, who he believed spent little on the property. Timber used in the new dwelling was cut on the property and limestone for the mortar is believed to have been quarried from a Ballandean paddock.

During Robertson's occupation the colonial government commenced a process of large-scale resumption of lease-hold pastoral land for closer agricultural selection. Under the Pastoral Leases Act of 1869, squatters had the option of protecting their homesteads and permanent improvements from this process by making a pre-emptive purchase of 2,560 acres (1,040 ha) of their lease. In 1872 Robertson purchased the land surrounding Ballandean head station, which included the home station, meat station, woolshed, stockyards and most of the improvements.

In the 1870s the Ballandean lease encompassed 133,202 acres (53,905 ha) extending north to Folkestone and south to the New South Wales border. In 1877 about half the leasehold, 98 square miles (250 km^{2}), was resumed for closer settlement.

While Robertson maintained Wellington Vale as his principal place of residence he also took an interest in the affairs of Ballandean. He appears to have spent some time there and used his freehold title to vote in the district from 1874. After his death in 1883 Robertson's executors consolidated Ballandean run concurrently with further government resumptions of the lease in March 1886. In 1889 they transferred the homestead and leasehold rights to James Fletcher, who erected a dingo proof fence on the property and cleared much of the run.

In 1889 the roads through Ballandean were surveyed. The Surveyor-General instructed that the road from Nundubbermere passing through the Ballandean pre-emptive should join the Red Rock Road near the head station, and Fletcher requested that the road pass the gate on the east side of his paddock. The road survey map shows the buildings of Ballandean head station near the gate and on the southern side of the new road. A woolshed was located some distance south and stockyards to the southwest.

Ballandean was acquired by John William Luke in 1906. Luke had been manager at Ballandean from about 1898 and did much to improve the property. He became a prominent public figure in the area, at one time serving as chairman of the Stanthorpe Shire Council. By the 1920s he had stocked the run with merino sheep. The property was noted for its high quality wool, a reputation based largely on the fact that it was free of many of the pests common elsewhere in pastures. At one time the run achieved a record price for its wool clip. Luke also ran ponies and Devon cattle on the property.

During Luke's ownership The Queenslander featured "the picturesque homestead of Ballandean station" in its issue of 24 May 1924. The author described the main residence as having been constructed in the mid-19th century, but the offices, stores, stables and yards were of more recent date. Although much reduced in size, the station still had 22 paddocks and a "park-like" appearance with rich grasses and abundant water.

Since the late 1920s Ballandean has undergone several changes in ownership. Between 1967 and 1973 a cavity brick house was built on the property for use as the main residence. This is not considered to be of cultural heritage significance and is not included in the heritage boundary for Ballandean Homestead.

Between 1973 and 1977 new owners renovated the c. 1870 homestead.

== Description ==
Ballandean Station is situated approximately 5 kilometres (3.1 mi) south-west of the township of Ballandean, which lies 20 kilometres (12 mi) south of Stanthorpe on the New England Highway. The large property borders part of the eastern edge of Sundown National Park, between the park and the NSW border, in an area of southern Queensland known as the Granite Belt. The former head station is in a contained area in the north-east of the property, within a kilometre of Washpool Creek, a tributary of the Severn River. The homestead comprises a number of structures of cultural heritage significance, including a rendered masonry house, detached kitchen, creamery, killing and milking sheds, combined stables and hayloft and the remains of a blacksmith's shed and forge.

=== House ===
The residence is a single-storeyed, rendered (stuccoed) brick building with a central rectangular core surrounded by wide verandahs. The side and northern verandahs have been enclosed. The roof is an elongated hip clad in corrugated steel sheeting. On each plane of the roof, the pitch reduces along a particular line, creating a broken-back skirt over the verandahs. Two tall, symmetrically disposed chimneystacks pierce the north-facing plane. The principal entrance is in the northern (rear) elevation.

An open verandah extends the length of the southern (front) elevation and is supported by tapering timber posts that are stop chamfered. The posts rest on concrete plinths. Four sets of early French doors open from the core of the building onto this verandah.

On the northern elevation the verandah is enclosed and a small, central, gable-roofed portico (a later addition) shelters the main entry doors. The portico roof is supported on two timber posts identical to those on the southern elevation. The double entry doors are low-waisted with glass fitted between fine mullions in the upper sections and a three-centred fixed fanlight above the transom. A narrow band of green and red glass forms a border to the upper half of each door leaf. On each side of the main doors are single banks of timber-framed windows.

The interior arrangement of rooms demonstrates an early layout. The rectangular core comprises three rooms, each with French doors opening to the southern (front) verandah. There is no central hallway, but there are single leaf doors opening between these rooms. The central room is the larger, with two pairs of French doors in the southern elevation and another opening into an entrance vestibule on the enclosed northern verandah. French doors also open from the eastern and western rooms to the formerly open side verandahs, which have been enclosed as sunrooms.

The sunrooms are similarly sized and, positioned at either end of the building, contribute to the symmetry of the external elevations. In their southern and side external walls there are large timber-framed, multi-paned windows (some casements and some fixed) with low sills. The interior sills are wide, making a ledge that has been fitted with timber.

On the northern side the main entrance opens into a small vestibule from which a door in each side wall opens to an enclosed verandah room. In both rooms there is a brick fireplace with a timber surround and mantel. The fireplace in the western verandah room stands back-to- back with a fireplace in the western room of the core. The rear of the fireplace in the eastern verandah room protrudes into the eastern room of the core, but there is no fireplace in this room.

The northern verandah has been enclosed at each corner to make two additional rooms. The north-east room has been refurbished as a kitchen and the north-west room as a bathroom and laundry, with external access.

Ceilings throughout the house are lined with wide timber boards, with those in the enclosed verandah rooms following the slope of the roof and those in the core being coved. The ceiling and walls of the kitchen have been further lined with fibrous-cement sheeting with timber cover strips and there is a pressed metal ceiling in the bathroom/laundry. The interior partition walls of the core are brick and these and all interior faces of the exterior brick walls are plastered and rendered. Several of the rooms have moulded picture rails, which vary in profile and in position on the wall. There are timber skirting boards at least six inches high throughout, except in the sunrooms, which appear to be a later addition.

=== Detached kitchen ===
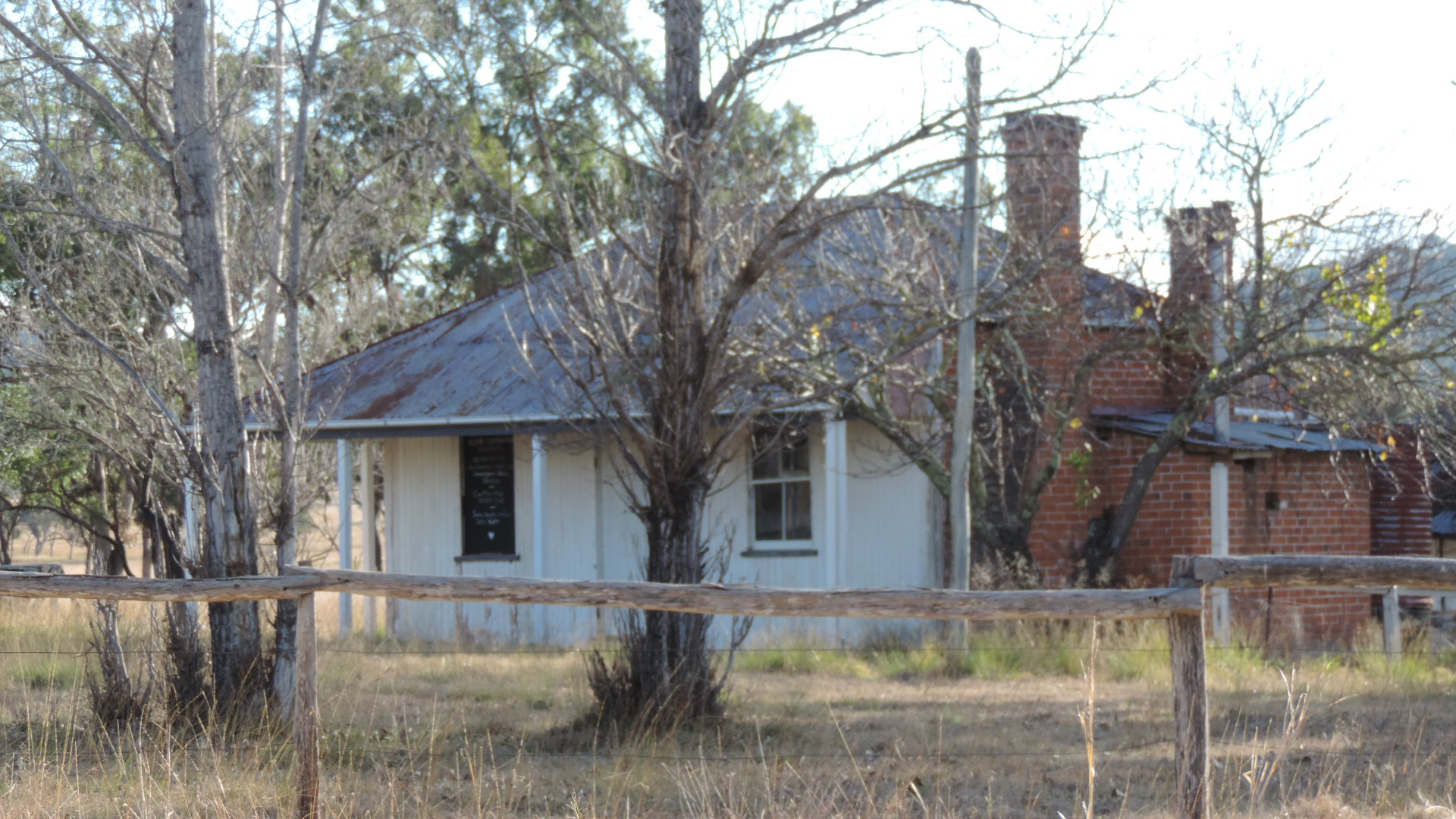
Detached kitchen, Ballandean Homestead, 2015

The detached kitchen is situated approximately 10 metres (33 ft) to the north-west of the house, connected to it by a concrete path. It is a timber-framed building elevated on low timber stumps and has a hipped roof, the ridgeline of which runs almost perpendicular to that of the main house. The roof is clad in corrugated iron sheeting. An approximately 1.5-metre (4 ft 11 in) wide verandah encircles the building on three sides. The main roof covers these areas and is supported at each edge by timber posts. On the northern elevation the plane of the roof does not extend over the end wall, which is of brick with two separate chimneys and a stove alcove, which has a skillion roof clad in corrugated iron sheeting.

The timber walls are single-skin, vertical tongue and groove timber boards, with the wall framing visible in the interior. The western elevation has three timber-framed, double-hung sashes and a single leaf door. There are two similar windows and a door on the eastern elevation.

Internally the detached kitchen is divided into two rooms, the smaller being accessed externally from the south. A timber board door connects the two rooms. The ceiling is lined with fibrous cement sheeting. In the rear masonry wall of the main room (the former kitchen) are a bread oven, a central cooking alcove with an early range and metal flue, and a brick fireplace with a gently curved head. This wall has been plastered at some stage.

=== Creamery ===
The creamery is sited approximately 6 metres (20 ft) to the west of the detached kitchen. It has a pyramid roof clad in corrugated iron sheets and walls constructed of horizontal painted timber slabs. There is a deep overhang on each face of this small building that is supported on large, undressed timber poles. In plan the walled part of the structure is approximately 2.5 metres (8 ft 2 in) square. There are a door opening and a screened window in the eastern elevation.

The killing shed is located almost 35 metres (115 ft) directly north of the detached kitchen, within an arrangement of operational outbuildings and yards. It is a small gabled structure made of vertical timber slabs. The roof is clad in corrugated iron sheeting. A single-leaf timber board door opens out of the southern elevation. Two timber- framed meat storage cupboards, lined with wire mesh, sit against the interior of the eastern elevation. The floor is a concrete slab, bordered by timber.

=== Milking Shed ===
The milking shed is located almost 20 metres (66 ft) directly north of the killing shed. The structure is comparatively long with a gabled roof clad in corrugated iron sheeting. Its northern face and ridgeline run almost parallel to Lynams Road, which runs from north-east to south- west past the Ballandean yards. It is constructed of unpainted, vertical timber slabs fixed to an undressed timber frame. Some of the framing members appear to be large stumps. A timber stock herder feeds into the eastern facade, while a large timber board gate opens into an ancillary yard off the western facade.

=== Stables and Hayloft ===
The combined stables and hayloft sit about 10 metres (33 ft) to the south-west of the milking shed. This structure also has a gable roof clad in corrugated iron sheeting and is constructed of vertical, unpainted timber slabs. The upper part of the eastern gable is clad in weatherboards and has a high door into the hayloft. The west-facing gable also has a high door but is clad in corrugated iron sheeting. There are timber doors or gates in each elevation, some of which give access to a large fenced yard.

The interior is divided by a series of timber slabs partitions the height of the long, side walls. The plan consists of a central corridor, the walls of which are half-height and made with horizontal slabs. This corridor leads into a room for which the hayloft platform makes a ceiling. The rafters are made of stripped tree trunks, while the battening that does exist is dressed timber.

=== Remains of blacksmith's shed and forge ===
The blacksmith's shed and forge is situated over 30 metres (98 ft) to the east and slightly to the north of the milking shed, on the north-east side of Lynams Road. The shed is a skillion-roofed structure, of which only the undressed framing, some upper sections of timber slab work and a part of a lower slab wall remain. One timber board gate is also still fixed to the frame. This building overlooks the remains of a forge, which comprise an upright piece of rusting iron and some loose timber framing.

=== Cemetery ===
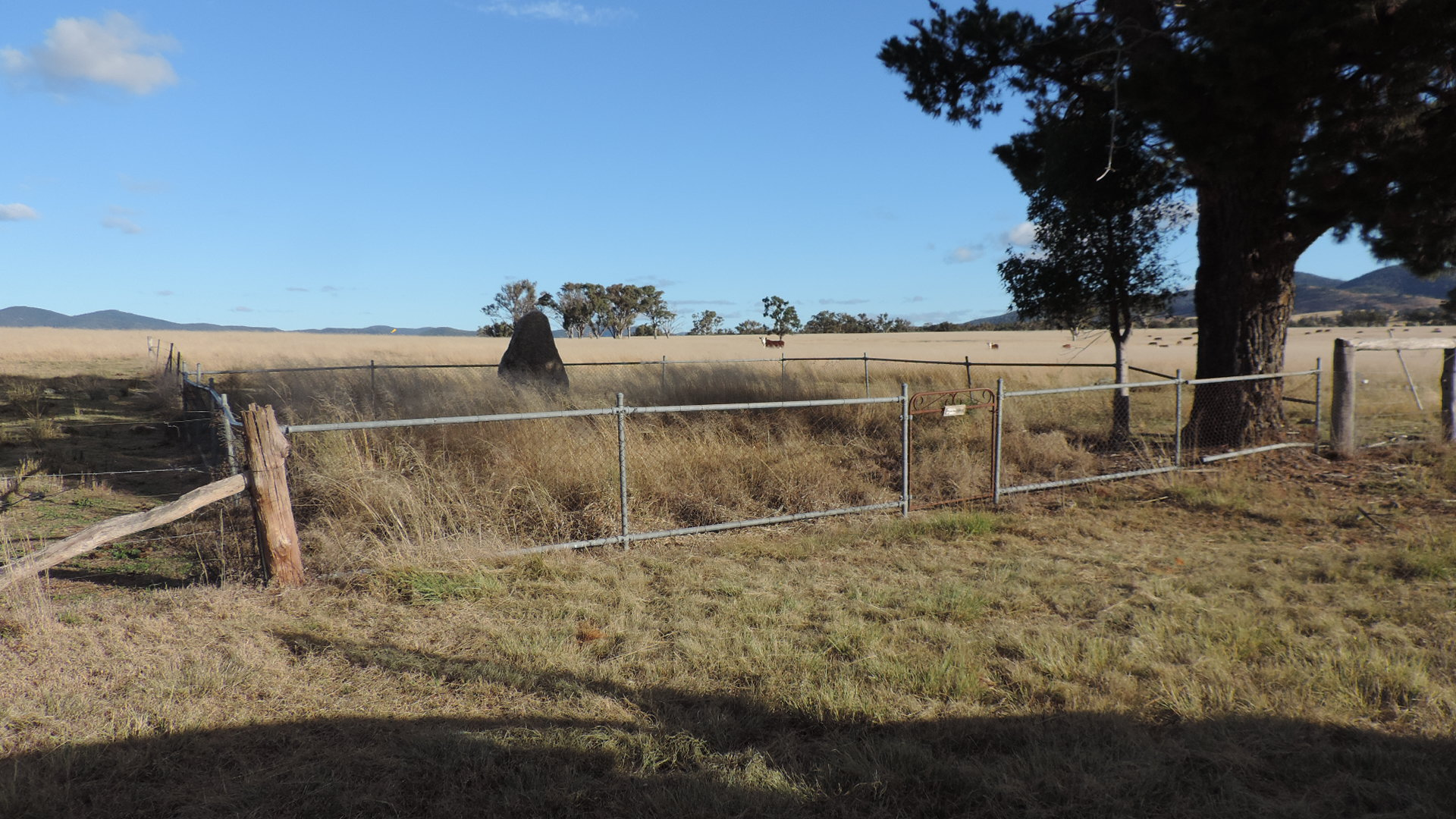
Ballandean Homestead Cemetery, 2015

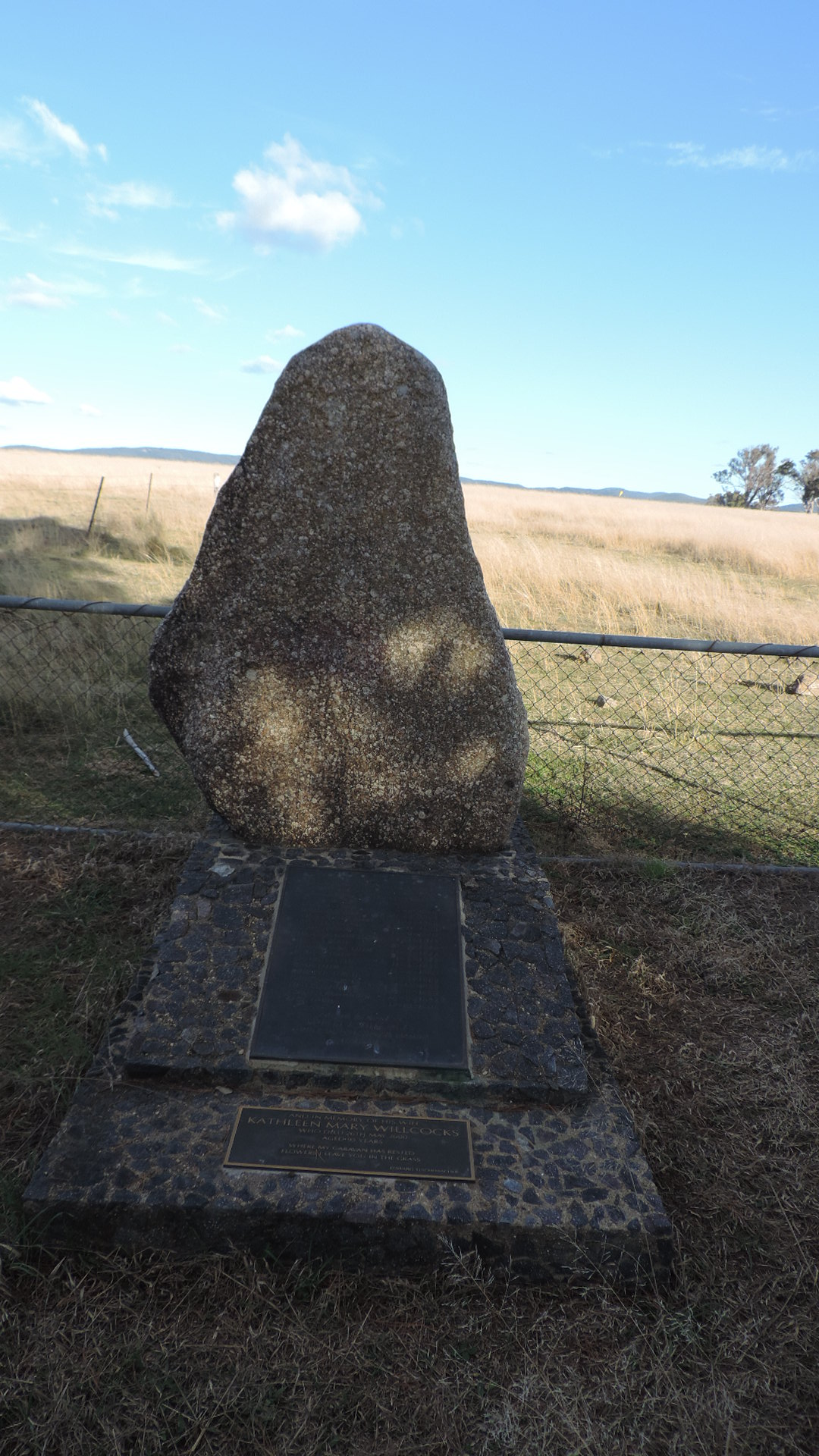
Single monument in the cemetery, 2015

The homestead has an associated cemetery on Sundown Road (28.8196°S 151.7880°E). There are no individual headstones remaining, but a single monument lists all those buried in the cemetery. The cemetery is not included in the heritage listing.

== Heritage listing ==
Ballandean Homestead was listed on the Queensland Heritage Register on 21 October 1992 having satisfied the following criteria.

The place is important in demonstrating the evolution or pattern of Queensland's history.

Ballandean Station, established c. 1840, was one of the earliest pastoral runs taken up in the Granite Belt district of Queensland. Ballandean Homestead, erected c. 1870, is important in demonstrating the evolution of Queensland's history, being associated with the pattern and nature of squatter occupation of the New England and Darling Downs districts preceding agriculture and the establishment of towns.

The place is important in demonstrating the principal characteristics of a particular class of cultural places.

The homestead is important in demonstrating the principal characteristics of early and evolving head stations on Queensland pastoral properties. Significant fabric in the homestead complex includes a masonry residence c. 1870, detached kitchen and a range of timber slab ancillary structures including cream house, killing shed, milking shed, and combined stables and hayloft. There are also the remnants of an early blacksmith's shed and forge. The residence has thick walls of rendered brickwork, coved ceilings, and early French doors, and is important in demonstrating an early (mid-19th century) arrangement of interior residential space.

The place is important because of its aesthetic significance.

The homestead complex has aesthetic importance as a picturesque and rustic place set in a rural environment, which quality has been valued by visitors over many decades.
