= Ballentine =

Ballentine may refer to:

== People ==
- Chris Ballentine, British geochemist
- Corey Ballentine, Jamaican American football player
- Ella Ballentine, Canadian actress
- John Goff Ballentine, American politician
- Lonnie Ballentine, American football player
- Lynton Y. Ballentine, American politician
- Michelle Ballentine, Jamaican athlete
- Nathan Ballentine, American politician
- Warren Ballentine, American lawyer and talk show host

== Places in the United States ==
=== Unincorporated communities ===
- Ballentine, Mississippi
- Ballentine, South Carolina

=== Other places ===
- Ballentine Place Historic District, in Norfolk, Virginia
- Ballentine / Broad Creek (Tide station), a light rail station in Norfolk, Virginia
- Ballentine-Shealy House, a historic home near Lexington, South Carolina

== See also ==
- Balanchine
- Ballantine (disambiguation)
- Ballantyne (disambiguation)
- Bellenden
- Ballenden
- Ballandean, Queensland
- Balindean, the spelling used by the Ogilvy-Wedderburn baronets
- Ballotine, a culinary sausage
