= Somme, Queensland =

Somme
- Suburb
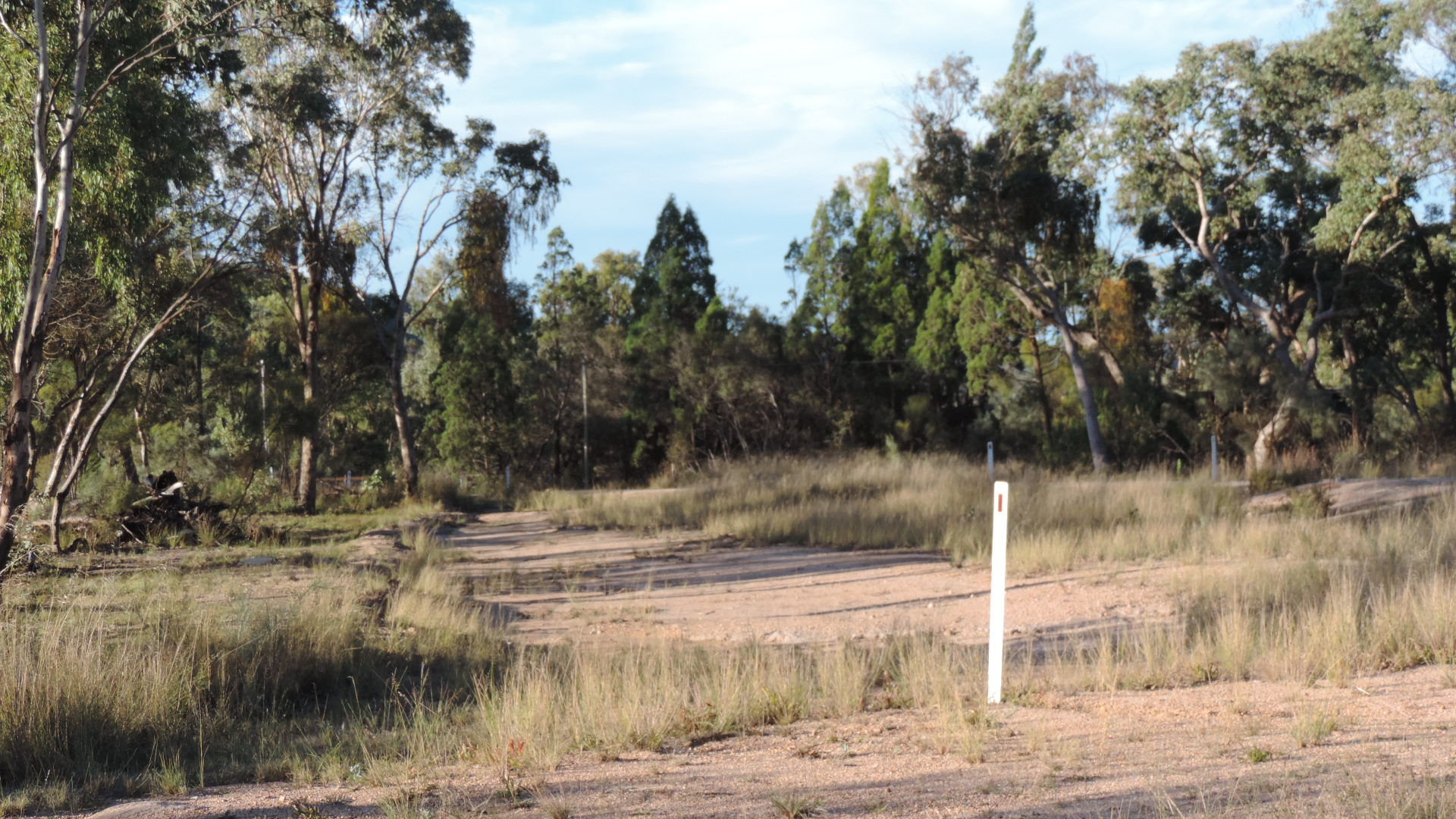
- Somme, 2015

- Interactive map of Somme
- Coordinates: 28.7730°S 151.8019°E
- Country: Australia
- State: Queensland
- LGA: Southern Downs Region
- Location: 23.7 km (14.7 mi) SW of Stanthorpe; 84.5 km (52.5 mi) SSW of Warwick; 168 km (104 mi) S of Toowoomba; 204 km (127 mi) SW of Ipswich; 245 km (152 mi) SW of Brisbane

Government
  - State electorate: Southern Downs
  - Federal division: Maranoa

Area
  - Total: 29.5 km^{2} (11.4 sq mi)

Population
  - Total: 39 (2021 census)
  - Density: 1.322/km^{2} (3.42/sq mi)
- Time zone: UTC+10:00 (AEST)
- Postcode: 4382
Suburbs around Somme
Nundubbermere	Nundubbermere	Glen Aplin
Nundubbermere	Somme	Fletcher
Ballandean	Ballandean	Ballandean

Somme is a rural locality in the Southern Downs Region, Queensland, Australia. In the 2021 census, Somme had a population of 39 people.

== Geography ==
Somme is bounded by the Severn River to the east and south and the land to the south and east is mostly used for farming and residential purposes. The land in the north-western part of Somme is mostly undeveloped.

== History ==
Somme was named after the Battle of the Somme in northern France. It was one of the largest battles for the Australian Imperial Forces in World War I. It is one of a number of localities in the Southern Downs Regions named after World War I battles.

Somme State School opened circa 1917. In 1924 it went from being a full-time school to being a half-time school in conjunction with Apple Vale State School in Apple Vale (meaning they shared a single teacher). Both schools closed in August 1927. Somme State School was on the south-west corner of the junction of Somme Lane and an unnamed street (28.7612°S 151.8122°E).

Somme State School opened on 22 February 1949 and closed in 1962. It is unclear if this was a reopening of the earlier school or a new school, a 1952 map shows Somme State School as being near Somme Lane but does not pinpoint its location as precisely as the 1922 map.

== Demographics ==
In the 2016 census, Somme had a population of 53 people.

In the 2021 census, Somme had a population of 39 people.

== Education ==
There are no schools in Somme. The nearest government primary schools are Glen Aplin State School in neighbouring Glen Aplin to the north-east and Ballandean State School in neighbouring Ballandean. The nearest government secondary school is Stanthorpe State High School in Stanthorpe.
