= Bannatyne (name) =

== Surname ==
- Andrew Bannatyne (1829–1889), Scottish-Canadian politician
- Very Rev Colin Bannatyne (1849–1920), twice Moderator of the General Assembly of the Free Church of Scotland
- Duncan Bannatyne (born 1949), Scottish entrepreneur
- George Bannatyne, (1545–1608), collector of Scottish poems
- James Bannatyne (born 1975), New Zealand football player
- Lesley Bannatyne, American author
- Mack Bannatyne (born 2001), Canadian football player
- Richard Bannatyne (died 1605), Scottish clergy
- William Bannatyne, Lord Bannatyne (1743–1833), Scottish lawyer and judge

== Middle name ==
- Robert Bannatyne Finlay (1842–1929), British doctor, lawyer, and politician
- Thomas Bannatyne Gillies (1828–1889), New Zealand politician

== See also ==
- Ballantine (surname)
- Bannatyne (disambiguation)
