= Sarah McLeod (Ballenden) =

Sarah McLeod (1818 – 23 December 1853) is notable in the history of Canada for being involved in a defamation case, the Foss-Pelly scandal.

== Early life ==
Sarah was born in Rupert's Land, i.e. the Hudson Bay drainage basin, part of British North America deeply involved in the fur trade. She was one of eight children of Alexander Roderick McLeod, chief trader for the Hudson's Bay Company, and a mixed-blood mother (see Marriage 'à la façon du pays' and Anglo-Métis). She grew up at trading posts in the Mackenzie River and Columbia areas. She was sent to the Red River Colony (now part of Manitoba) to receive a formal education.

At Red River she met John Ballenden, a newly appointed Scottish accountant at Upper Fort Garry, whom she married in 1836. This type of mixed marriage was still considered socially acceptable at this time. The Ballendens began to raise a family. When John was named chief factor, they returned to Red River in 1848. He was in poor health but recovering and they were active in leading the social life of the community.

== Foss-Pelly scandal ==
In 1850, Sarah Ballenden found herself involved in a situation which became known as the Foss-Pelly scandal, characterised by Joseph James Hargrave in his 1871 history Red River as a cause célèbre (as quoted in the Dictionary of Canadian Biography). In short, she was accused of an adulterous affair with a Captain Christopher Vaughan Foss. Leading the defamation campaign was a couple named Pelly. It appears that the motivation was jealousy over the social status of Sarah given her Métis heritage. A three-day trial ruled in favour of Foss and awarded heavy damages but the apparent racial tensions were brought into the open. The situation was only resolved when Eden Colvile arrived in post, and dispatched the Pelly couple, Captain Foss, and the Ballendens away from the colony. John Ballenden took a posting at Fort Vancouver, his wife being too ill from childbirth to accompany him. In 1853 the husband arranged leave in Scotland and had his nephew, Andrew Graham Ballenden Bannatyne, accompany his family to Edinburgh. There the family was reunited briefly before Sarah Ballenden died.
