= Ian Ballantyne =

Scottish footballer

Personal information
- Full name: Ian Ballantyne
- Date of birth: 2 November 1958 (age 67)
- Place of birth: Achanamara, Scotland
- Position: Striker

Youth career
- Williamsburgh Amateurs

Senior career*
Years	Team	Apps	(Gls)
1977–1979	Queen's Park	57	(19)
1979	Dundee United	2	(0)
1979–1982	Raith Rovers	107	(40)
1982–1983	East Stirlingshire	11	(3)
- Zindabad
1991–1992	Ernest Borel		
- * Club domestic league appearances and goals

Ian Ballantyne (born 1958) is a former footballer who played as a striker for Queens Park, Dundee United, Raith Rovers and East Stirlingshire. He also played in Hong Kong for Zindabad, Sing Tao and Ernest Borel.

Ballantyne joined Dundee United in April 1979 with his competitive debut coming in August. Three months later, Ballantyne joined Raith in a £12,500 deal, spending four years with the Kirkcaldy side. Later playing for East Stirlingshire, Ballantyne moved to Hong Kong shortly afterwards.
