= Glen Aplin, Queensland =

Glen Aplin
- Suburb
- Interactive map of Glen Aplin
- Coordinates: 28.7388°S 151.8794°E
- Country: Australia
- State: Queensland
- LGA: Southern Downs Region
- Location: 11.2 km (7.0 mi) SW of Stanthorpe; 72.4 km (45.0 mi) SSW of Warwick; 46 km (29 mi) N of Tenterfield; 155 km (96 mi) S of Toowoomba; 232 km (144 mi) SW of Brisbane

Government
  - State electorate: Southern Downs
  - Federal division: Maranoa

Area
  - Total: 38.5 km^{2} (14.9 sq mi)
- Elevation: 762 m (2,500 ft)

Population
  - Total: 566 (2021 census)
  - Density: 14.70/km^{2} (38.08/sq mi)
- Time zone: UTC+10:00 (AEST)
- Postcode: 4381
Suburbs around Glen Aplin
Thorndale	Thorndale	Severnlea
Nundubbermere	Glen Aplin	Mount Tully
Somme	Fletcher	Fletcher

Glen Aplin is a rural locality in the Southern Downs Region, Queensland, Australia. In the 2021 census, Glen Aplin had a population of 566 people.

== Geography ==
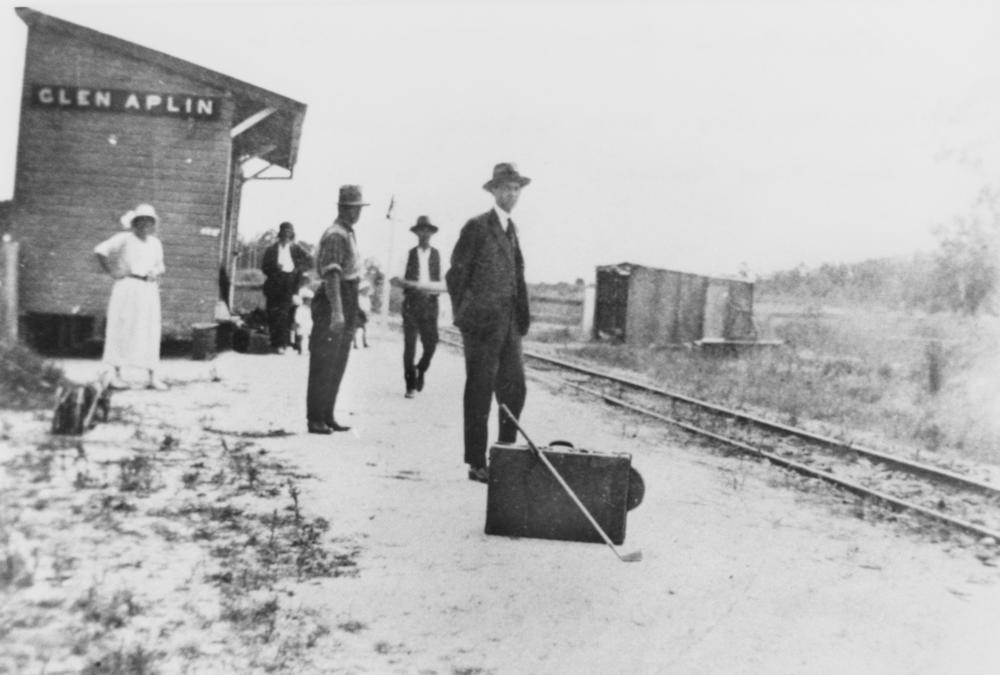
Glen Aplin railway station, 1920

The New England Highway passes from north to south through the locality. The Southern railway line also passes from north to south through the locality with the locality served by the now-abandoned Glen Aplin railway station (28.7396°S 151.8773°E).

Although not gazetted as a town, most of the population lives close to the railway station.

== History ==
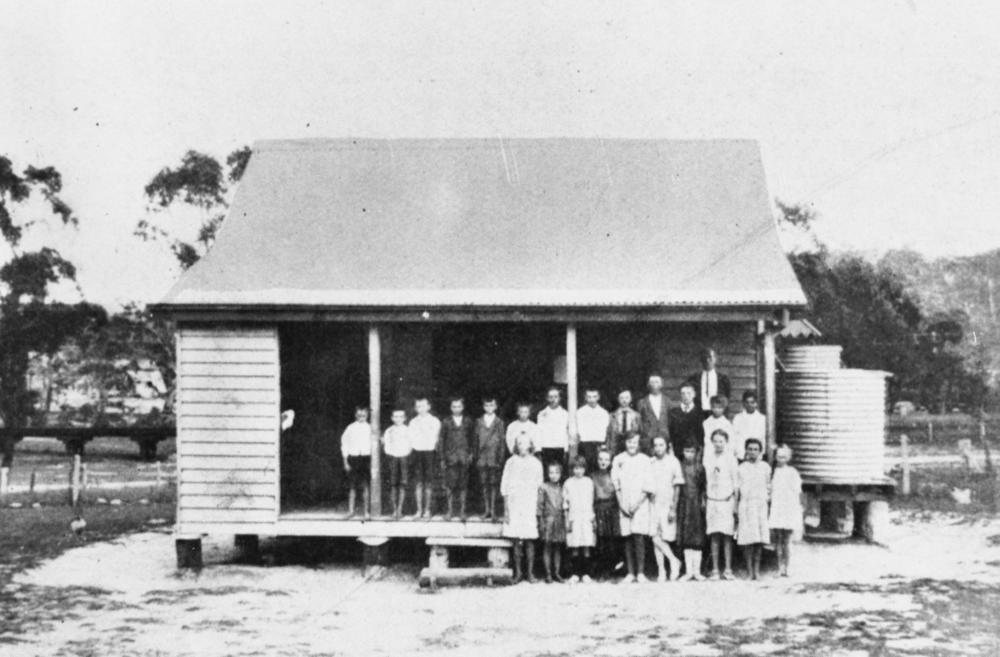
Students and their teacher outside their classroom at Glen Aplin State School, 1924

The locality takes its name from the railway station, which in turn was named in about 1886, after Dyson Aplin, a mine proprietor and pioneer settler in the area.

Severn River Provisional School opened in 1872 but closed in 1873. It reopened on 4 August 1887, but closed in 1906. It reopened in 1908, becoming Severn River State School on 1 January 1909. In March 1916, it was renamed Glen Aplin State School.

A postal receiving office was opened on 9 April 1888 and become a post office on 2 November 1914.

Mount Stirling Provisional School opened in 1919 and closed in 1928.

On Friday 3 September 1953, Glen Aplin Memorial Hall was officially opened by Paul Hilton, the Queensland Secretary for Public Works and Housing. It was built to commemorate those who served in World War I and World War II.

== Demographics ==
In the 2016 census, Glen Aplin had a population of 503 people.

In the 2021 census, Glen Aplin had a population of 566 people.

== Education ==
Glen Aplin State School is a government primary (Prep-6) school for boys and girls at 54 Mount Stirling Road (28.7387°S 151.8730°E). In 2016, the school had an enrolment of 102 students with 9 teachers (7 full-time equivalent) and 6 non-teaching staff (4 full-time equivalent). In 2018, the school had an enrolment of 101 students with 10 teachers (8 full-time equivalent) and 7 non-teaching staff (4 full-time equivalent).

There is no secondary school in Glen Aplin. The nearest government secondary school is Stanthorpe State High School in Stanthorpe to the north-east.

There is also a Catholic primary-and-secondary school in Stanthorpe.

== Amenities ==
The Glen Applin Memorial Hall is at 14 Foster Street (28.7375°S 151.8766°E).

The Glen Aplin branch of the Queensland Country Women's Association meet at the Glen Aplin Memorial Hall.

St James' Anglican Church is at 30 Glen Aplin Drive (28.7357°S 151.8794°E). It is part of the Stanthorpe Parish within the Anglican Diocese of Brisbane.
