= Jean Ballantyne =

New Zealand ballet teacher, examiner, and choreographer

Jean Ballantyne (10 July 1906 – 17 November 1980) was a New Zealand ballet teacher, examiner, and choreographer.

== Early life ==
Ballantyne was born in Hastings, Hawke's Bay, New Zealand on 10 July 1906, to Herbert Gregory Ballantyne and schoolteacher Edith Emily Hartshorn. She was of Scottish descent through her father's side.

One of five children, she began dancing lessions in Hastings at the age of four with her sister Bessie, and later attended Napier Girls' High School. She ran a ballet studio founded by her sister and one of her friends.

== Career ==
In 1936, Ballantyne qualified to join the Imperial Society of Teachers of Dancing in London. Back in her native country, she later attained the Advanced Teacher's Certificate from the Royal Academy of Dancing.

After the expansion of her studio, Ballantyne taught classes throughout the Hawke's Bay area, organising regular children's recitals at the Hastings Municipal Theatre, which she designed and choreographed herself.

The RAD invited her to become one of its examiners in 1953, after which she spent twenty years travelling across New Zealand, Fiji, Singapore, Malaya, Hong Kong and England, examining students and leading courses for teachers.

After ill health forced her to retire, she was made a life member of the Royal Academy of Dancing in 1977.

== Personal life ==
Ballantyne was a member of the Anglican church. Outside of ballet, her keenest interests including gardening and painting.

She married Royal Navy veteran Cedric Joseph Wright DSC on 28 January 1950; the couple never had children. Ballantyne died at her home in Hastings on 17 November 1980. Cedric Wright died on 3 October 1993.
