= John Ballantyne (minister) =

Scottish minister

John Ballantyne (1778–1830) was a Scottish minister of religion.

== Life ==
Ballantyne was born in the parish of Kinghorn 8 May 1778; entered the University of Edinburgh in 1795, and joined the Burgher branch of the Secession Church, though his parents belonged to the establishment. He was ordained minister of a congregation at Stonehaven, Kincardineshire, in 1805.

He died 5 November 1830.

== Works ==
In 1824 he published A Comparison of Established and Dissenting Churches, by a Dissenter; in 1830 this pamphlet was republished with additions during the 'voluntary church' controversy of the period. Ballantyne was a partisanship in the controversy.

His Examination of the Human Mind (first part) appeared in 1828; two further parts were intended, but never appeared. It is the work of a follower of Thomas Reid and Dugald Stewart, with some criticism of Thomas Brown.
