= Broadwater, Queensland =

Broadwater
- Suburb
- Interactive map of Broadwater
- Coordinates: 28.6611°S 151.8788°E
- Country: Australia
- State: Queensland
- LGA: Southern Downs Region
- Location: 7.0 km (4.3 mi) W of Stanthorpe; 65.9 km (40.9 mi) SSW of Warwick; 149 km (93 mi) S of Toowoomba; 225 km (140 mi) SW of Brisbane

Government
  - State electorate: Southern Downs
  - Federal division: Maranoa

Area
  - Total: 34.8 km^{2} (13.4 sq mi)

Population
  - Total: 321 (2021 census)
  - Density: 9.224/km^{2} (23.89/sq mi)
- Time zone: UTC+10:00 (AEST)
- Postcode: 4380
Suburbs around Broadwater
Amiens	Cannon Creek	Applethorpe
Greenlands	Broadwater	Stanthorpe
Thorndale	Severnlea	Severnlea

Broadwater is a rural locality in the Southern Downs Region, Queensland, Australia. In the 2021 census, Broadwater had a population of 321 people.

== History ==
Broadwater Provisional School opened in 1902 and became Broadwater State School on 1 January 1909. It closed in 1922. In parallel, Broadwater Crossing Provisional School opened on 10 July 1905 and became Broadwaster Crossing State School on 1 January 1909. After the closure of Broadwater State School in 1922, in 1926 Broadwater Crossing State School was renamed Broadwater State School.

== Demographics ==
In the 2016 census, Broadwater had a population of 292 people.

In the 2021 census, Broadwater had a population of 321 people.

== Road infrastructure ==
The Stanthorpe – Texas Road runs through from east to west.

== Amenities ==
The Broadwater branch of the Queensland Country Women's Association has its hall at 626 Texas Road.

== Education ==
Broadwater State School is a government primary (Prep-6) school for boys and girls at 636-638 Texas Road (corner of Caslick Lane, 28.6555°S 151.8786°E). In 2016, the school had an enrolment of 46 students with 3 teachers (2 full-time equivalents) and 5 non-teaching staff (3 full-time equivalents). In 2018, the school had an enrolment of 60 students with 4 teachers (3 full-time equivalent) and 7 non-teaching staff (4 full-time equivalent).

There are no secondary schools in Broadwater. The nearest government secondary school is Stanthorpe State High School in Stanthorpe to the east.
