= Ron Ballantyne =

New Zealand international rugby league footballer

Personal information
- Full name: Ronald Stuart Ballantyne
- Born: 23 October 1945 (age 79)

Playing information
- Position: Stand-off
Representative
Years	Team	Pld	T	G	FG	P
≤1967–≥67	Northland
1967	New Zealand	0	0	0	0	0

Ronald Stuart Ballantyne (birth unknown) is a New Zealand former professional rugby league footballer who played in the 1960s. He played at representative level for New Zealand, and Northland, as a stand-off.

== International honours ==
Ballantyne represented New Zealand in 1967 against Australia.
