= Ballentine Place Historic District =

Historic district in Virginia, United States

- U.S. National Register of Historic Places
- U.S. Historic district
- Virginia Landmarks Register
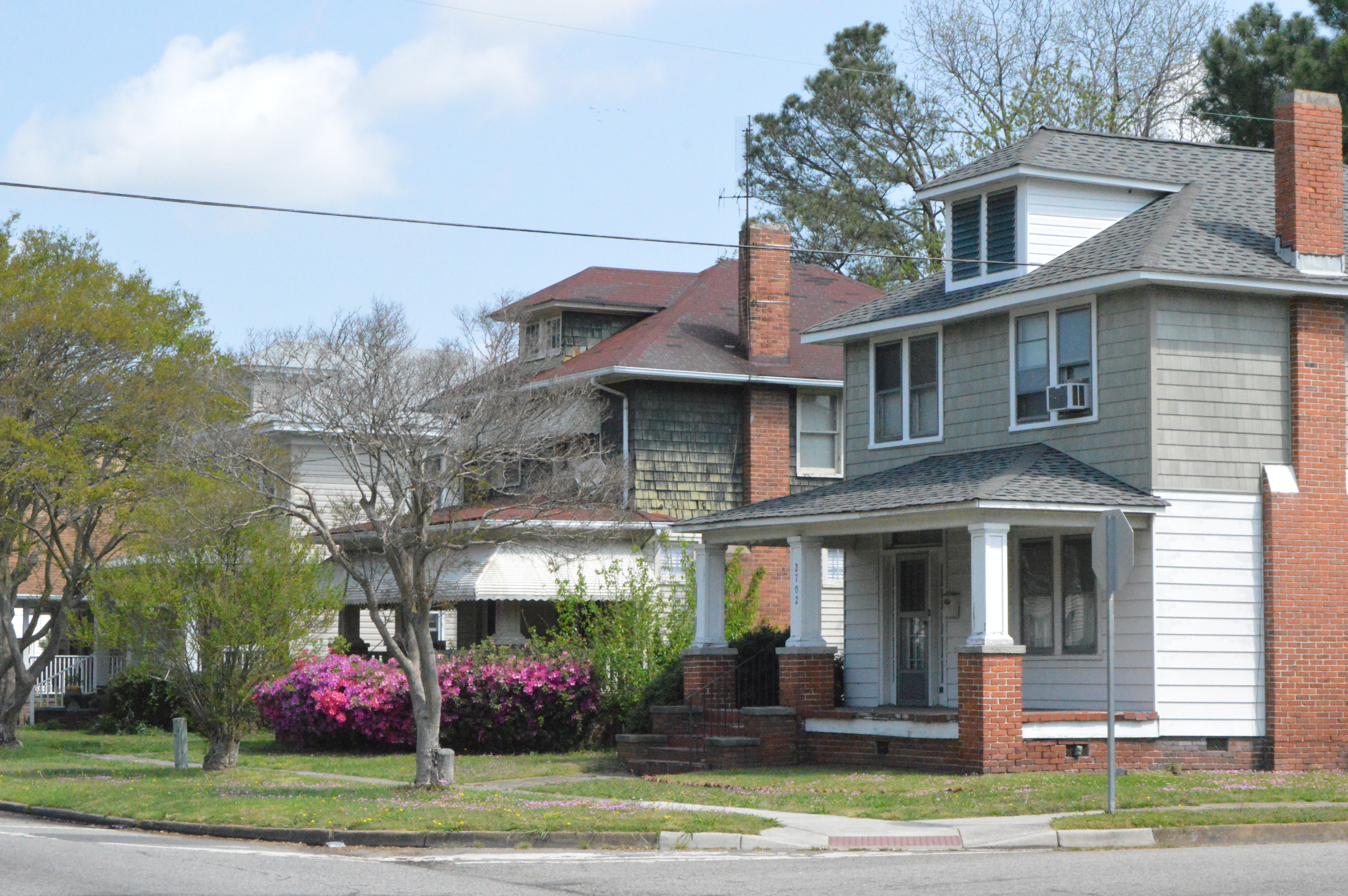
- Houses on Ballentine Boulevard

- Location within Virginia Location within the United States
- Location: Roughly bounded by Cromwell Ave., Cape Henry Ave., McKann Ave., and Lafayette Blvd., Norfolk, Virginia
- Coordinates: 36°52′01″N 76°15′11″W
- Area: 145 acres (59 ha)
- Built: 1900
- Architect: J.W. Lee, et al.
- Architectural style: Late Victorian, Late 19th And 20th Century Revivals
- NRHP reference No.: 03000459
- VLR No.: 122-0829

Significant dates
- Added to NRHP: May 22, 2003
- Designated VLR: March 19, 2003

The Ballentine Place Historic District is a national historic district located at Norfolk, Virginia. It encompasses 860 contributing buildings, 1 contributing site, and 1 contributing object in a cohesive residential neighborhood located near the center of Norfolk. It was platted in 1909, and largely developed between 1915 and 1953. The district includes a park developed in the 1930s by the Works Progress Administration (WPA). Notable non-residential buildings include the Ballentine School (1915-1916), Trinity Baptist Church (1953), United New Life Church of Christ in Holiness Church (1930), the Emmanuel Holy Temple Church (once the Fairmont Park Sunday School, 1920), and the Tabernacle of the Congregation Church of God in Christ (1930).

It was listed on the National Register of Historic Places in 2003.
