= Bannatyne Cove =

Canadian settlement in Newfoundland and Labrador

Bannatyne Cove is a Canadian fishing settlement in the Humber-Bay of Islands electoral district in Newfoundland and Labrador. It is slightly southeast of Sopers, Allens Brook, Mount Moriah, and Giles Point, and slightly northwest of Pleasant Cove, Petries, and Georgetown. It's a part of the city of Corner Brook.

A 1901 census shows 13 men, 4 women, and 14 homes. In 1918, Bannatyne was listed within the St. George electoral district and its nearest post town was Curling.

In 2014, Bannatyne Cove, along with a number of other locations around the Bay of Islands, showed signs of a green crab infestation. An inedible, invasive species, it caused concern among biologists, as it is highly aggressive.

== See also ==
- List of communities in Newfoundland and Labrador
- Aquatic invasive species in Canada
