= William Ballantine (priest) =

Scottish priest (1616/1618–1661)

- Prefect of Scotland
- Church: Catholic Church
- See: Apostolic Prefecture of Scotland
- In office: 13 October 1653 – 2 September 1661
- Predecessor: John Hamilton
- Successor: Alexander Dunbar Winchester

Orders
- Ordination: 3 December 1645

Personal details
- Born: 1616/1618 Douglas, Lanarkshire, Kingdom of Scotland
- Died: 2 September 1661 (aged 43–44) Elgin, County of Moray, Kingdom of Scotland

William Ballantine (also Ballentine, Bannatine, Ballantyne, Ballentyne, Ballenden, Bellenden) (1616/1618 – 2 September 1661) was a Roman Catholic priest who became the first Prefect of Scotland.

== Life ==
Ballantine was a native of Douglas, Lanarkshire, the parish of which his father was the minister. His paternal uncle was a lord of session, with the title of Lord Newhall. He studied at the University of Edinburgh, and later travelled on the continent. At Paris, he was converted to the Catholic religion. He entered the Scotch College, Rome, where he took the oath on 1 November 1641, and for the next five years he studied philosophy and theology. In consequence of his delicate health, he was ordained a priest earlier than usual, on 3 December 1645. Having received the order of priesthood, he left the Scots College on 15 March 1646 and then stayed in the Scotch college at Paris, preparing himself for the mission.

In 1649 Ballantine returned to Scotland. At this period the secular clergy of Scotland were in a state of disorganisation, and dissensions had arisen between them and the members of the religious orders, particularly the Jesuits. Ballantine despatched the Rev. William Leslie to Rome to ask for the appointment of a bishop for Scotland. This request was not granted by the Holy See, but in 1653, by a decree of propaganda, the Scotch secular clergy were freed from the jurisdiction of the English prelates and Jesuit superiorship; they were incorporated into a missionary body under the superintendence of Ballantine, who was declared the first Prefect-apostolic of the Mission in Scotland by the Propaganda Congregation on 13 October 1653.

Among other conversions, he received Lewis Gordon, 3rd Marquess of Huntly into the Catholic Church. In 1656 Ballantine visited France, and on his return, landing at Rye, Sussex, he was arrested by Oliver Cromwell's orders and taken to London, where he remained in confinement for nearly two years. He was then banished and withdrew to Paris in poverty. In 1660 he returned to Scotland, and he spent the brief remainder of his life in the house of the Marchioness of Huntly at Elgin, where he died on 2 September 1661, aged 45. He was buried in the Huntly aisle of Elgin Cathedral.

== Works ==
From the writings of Jean Suffren he composed a treatise On Preparation for Death, of which a second edition was published at Douay in 1716.

Catholic Church titles
New title	Prefect of Scotland; 1653–1661	Succeeded by Alexander Dunbar Winchester
