= Ballantyne (company) =

Italian knitwear brand

Corso Italia S.p.A.
- Trade name: Ballantyne
- Industry: Fashion
- Founded: 1920; 106 years ago
- Owner: Charme Investments
- Website: www.ballantyne.it

Ballantyne is an Italian knitwear and fashion brand with historical roots in the Scottish textile industry. The Ballantyne family has been active in textile manufacturing in the Scottish Borders region since the 17th century, and during the 19th century established several woollen enterprises operating mills in the region. These businesses were amalgamated in 1920 into a single company.

Over the course of the 20th century, the company became famous for the quality of its luxury cashmere production. Following financial difficulties in the early 21st century, the brand was acquired in 2004 by the Italian investment fund Charme and has since been operated from Italy, with the original Scottish mill closing in 2013.

== History ==
=== Background ===
The Ballantyne family has been associated with textile production since the 17th century, with documented origins tracing back to William Ballantyne, a weaver from Galashiels born in 1650. In 1822, a descendant of the family, David Ballantyne, was recorded as a member of the Galashiels Manufacturers Association. At the turn of the 19th century, Scottish woollen manufacturers experienced declining demand for traditional fabrics such as grey and blue cloths. This downturn was reversed from the 1820s onward, when innovations in patterns and colourings contributed to the emergence of the modern Scottish tweed trade. Between 1820 and 1829, David Ballantyne rented Caerlee Mills at Innerleithen, where his son Henry Ballantyne (1802–1865) started his first weaving business. Built in 1788, Caerlee Mills was the first woollen mill established in the Scottish Borders. In 1847, Henry left Galashiels for Walkerburn, where he founded Henry Ballantyne & Sons.

Following Henry's death in 1865, the business was inherited by his five sons, who continued to expand the family's industrial activities during a period of growth in the Scottish woollen trade. In 1870, three of his sons, George, James and Henry, founded Ballantyne Bros. at Innerleithen, where they constructed Waverley Mills. In 1883, Henry's eldest son, David Ballantyne (1826–1912), established D. Ballantyne & Co. at March Street Mills in Peebles. By the turn of the 20th century, both enterprises had expanded significantly, following the acquisition of Caerlee Mills in 1886 and the modernisation of machinery to meet increasing domestic and international demand.

=== Scottish period ===
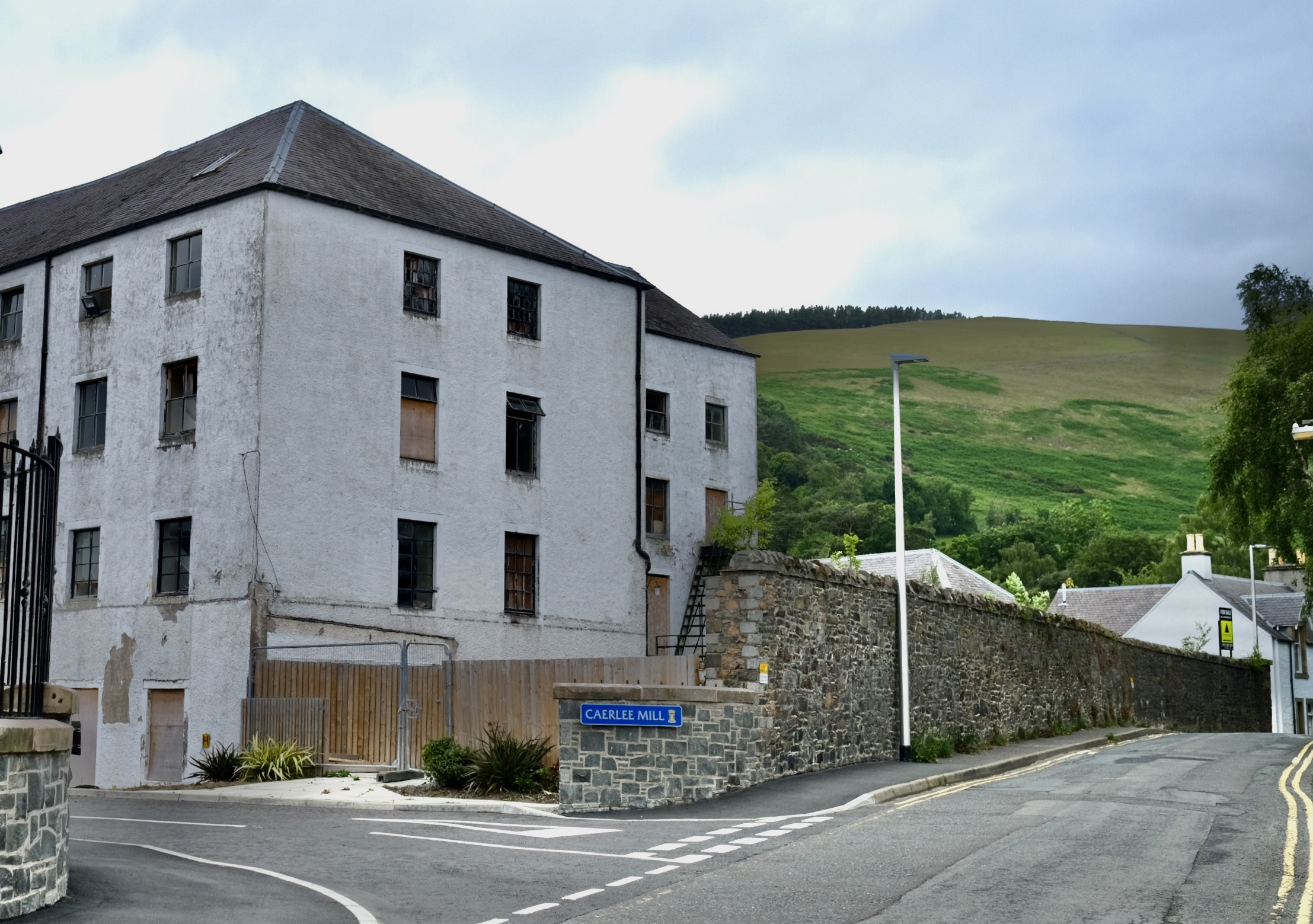
Caerlee Mill in Innerleithen, former Ballantyne knitwear factory

In 1920, Ballantyne Bros. and D. Ballantyne & Co. merged to form D. Ballantyne Brothers & Co. Ltd., with Sir Henry Ballantyne appointed chairman. In 1921, the company introduced knitting operations initially to utilise surplus yarn, producing men's golf hose. This initiative proved successful and expanded into cashmere knitwear, including men's pullovers and women's sweaters. During the 1920s and 1930s, the company developed intarsia knitwear techniques and became particularly associated with argyle patterns.

Despite major economic disruptions, including the post–First World War slump and the Great Depression, the company consolidated its position within the Scottish woollen industry during the interwar period. In 1945, knitwear activities were reorganised under Ballantyne Sportswear Co. Ltd., whose output grew rapidly in the post-World War II period. The company came to rival Hawick factories in fine knitwear and gained international recognition for the quality of its luxury cashmere production. By 1963, the firm employed 400 people at its factory.

=== Italian period ===
By the early 21st century, Ballantyne was facing increasing financial difficulties. In 2004, the brand was acquired by the Italian investment fund Charme Investments, associated with Luca Cordero di Montezemolo. Despite the acquisition, the company continued to record substantial losses, exceeding €7 million by 2021. The operating company was subsequently placed into liquidation, while the brand itself was preserved through a newly created entity, Corso Italia S.p.A. In 2013, Caerlee Mills, the Scottish factory previously owned by Ballantyne and used for its cashmere knitwear production, ceased operations following an unsuccessful sale process.

In 2014, Italian designer Fabio Gatto acquired Ballantyne for approximately €5–6 million. Gatto assumed the roles of president and creative director, while his son Umberto Gatto became chief executive officer. Under the new ownership, Ballantyne's distribution network was restructured, with a renewed focus on knitwear as the brand's core business. By the mid-2010s, Ballantyne products were distributed across Italy and internationally, with sales concentrated mainly in the Italian market, followed by South Korea and Japan.
