= John Ballenden =

Canadian politician

John Ballenden (c. 1812 – 7 December 1856) was one of the Scottish fur traders that the Hudson's Bay Company recruited to administer that trade in North America.

Ballenden started as an apprentice at York Factory, Rupert's Land in 1829 and was named accountant at Upper Fort Garry in 1836. He married Sarah McLeod, the daughter of Alexander Roderick McLeod, chief trader with the HBC, in a mixed marriage that was still common among the traders at the time.

Through a number of career moves, Ballenden became a chief factor with the company. His mixed marriage created a number of hardships for the family and led to his taking furlough and a reposting. On the death of his wife, he again took charge of trading out of the Red River Colony. Deteriorating health had him return to Scotland where he died.

In an age when the fur trade was rapidly changing, John Ballenden was an able and loyal employee who, despite the family problems, had his children educated in Scotland and prepared for the changing social landscape of the time.
