= Granite Belt =

Coordinates: 28°39′20″S 151°55′57″E

- Region
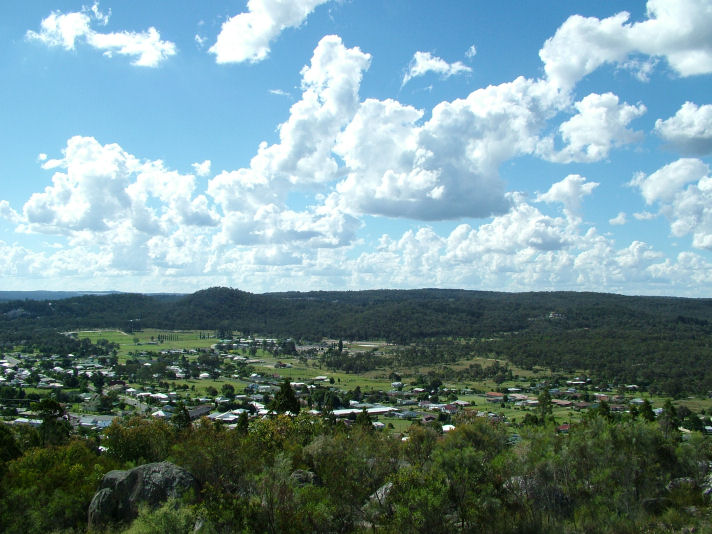
- The town of Stanthorpe
- Country: Australia
- State: Queensland
- LGA: Southern Downs Region

Government
  - State electorate: Southern Downs
  - Federal division: Maranoa

The Granite Belt is an area of the Great Dividing Range in the Darling Downs region of Queensland and the New England region of New South Wales, Australia. The Granite Belt is centred on the town of Stanthorpe. The cool, high country of the granite belt is located on Queensland's southern border. It is the northernmost part of the New England Tablelands.

The area gains its name from the predominantly granite rocks that distinguish it from other areas that make up much of South East Queensland. The Granite Belt is known for its spectacular flowers, and produces virtually all of Queensland's $40 million apple crop from one million trees grown by 55 orchardists.

The area also lies within the Southern Downs region. Including the town of Warwick, the region has a population of 32,600 people. The major river in the region is the Condamine River, a tributary of the Murray River.

== Climate ==
The Granite Belt has a subtropical highland climate that shares similarities to a typical oceanic climate. Under the Köppen climate classification system this would be called a Cfb climate. It is distinguished by its elevation, which makes it the coldest part of Queensland. Being amongst the highest altitude viticultural regions in Australia, it is an ideal climate for grapes, apples, stone fruit and many other fruits and vegetables with the exception of a tendency for hail. Winter months can be very cold on the Granite Belt, and night-time frost is very common. Bleak, overcast conditions on rare occasions bring hail, sleet, and snow. The area has received significant snowfalls in 1984, 2007 and 2015. Situated at between 680 m (2,230 ft) to over 1,200 m (3,900 ft) above sea level, the altitude is the main controlling factor for the climate. The elevation creates a climate of four distinct seasons on the Granite Belt.

The area is a popular tourist destination, particularly for the short-break drive market from South East Queensland and northern New South Wales. The boom in wine tourism has been a key driver, and while winter is popular, the region benefits from being a cool contrast to coastal humidity in the summer. Despite spring frosts and variable soils Granite Belt grapes and wines are considered high quality.

== Soils ==
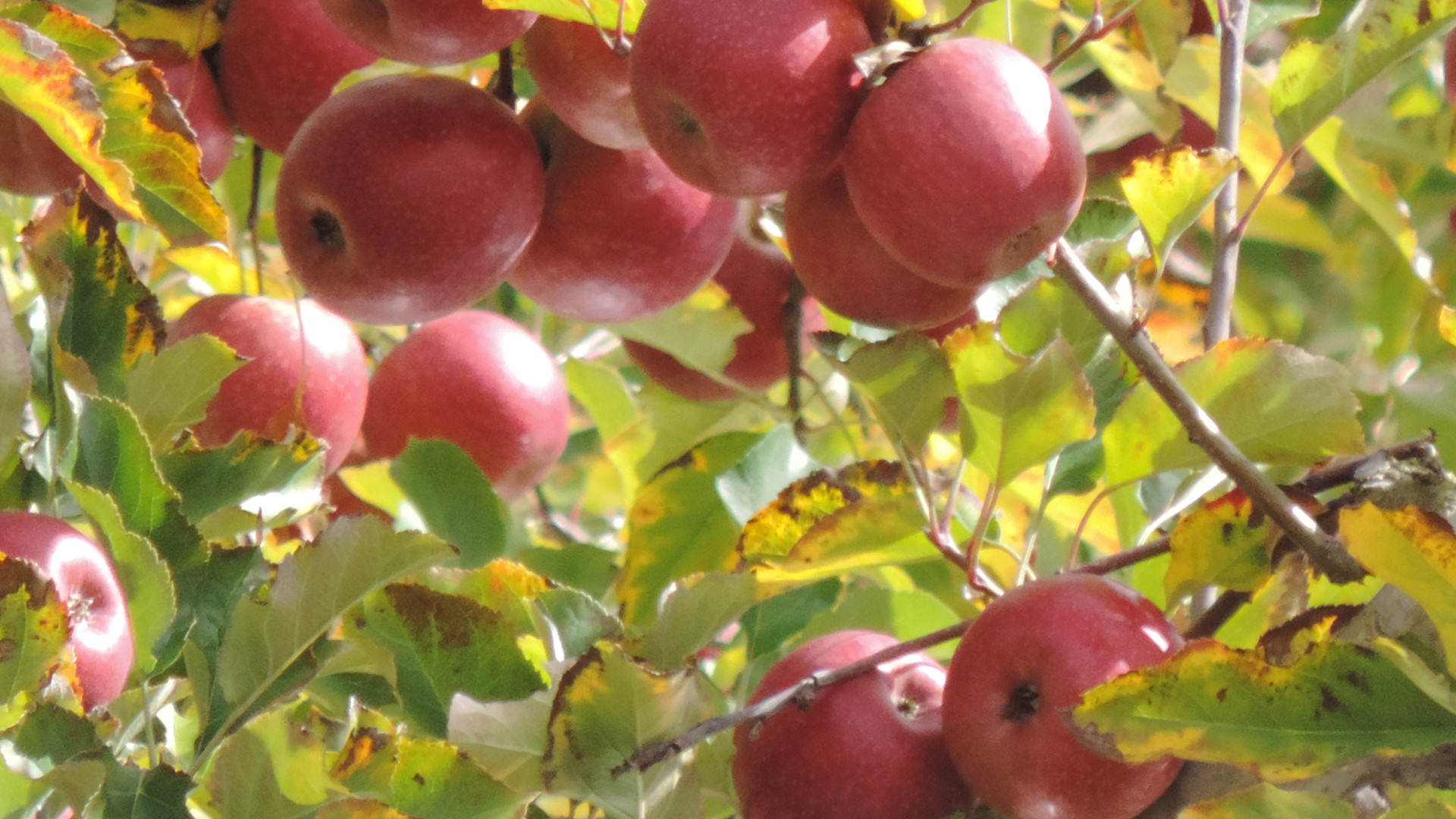
Pink lady apples, Thulimba, 2015

The regions soils are derived from the parent rocks of Ruby Creek Granite and Stanthorpe Adamellite that form the northern section of the New England Batholith. They are typically sandy loam to clay loam surface soils with clay or parent rock at depth.

== Towns ==
The town of Dalveen is in the north of the Granite Belt. Other villages include Applethorpe, Amiens, Ballandean, Glen Aplin, Passchendaele, Thulimbah, Pozieres, and Wallangarra, in the south at the border with New South Wales. Liston is a small village in New South Wales that is considered part of the Granite Belt.

== Attractions ==
Stanthorpe and the surrounding Granite Belt and Granite Highlands area of South East Queensland and Northern New South Wales are the centre of a booming winery and national parks tourist destination. There are more than 50 wineries in the Granite Belt area. The Granite Belt national parks are Girraween, Bald Rock, Sundown, and Boonoo Boonoo. The region operates its own wine and tourism marketing body named Granite Belt Wine Country.

There is a wide range of restaurants, accommodation places and other tourist venues. Backpacking is popular and there is large demand for fruit and vegetable pickers from November until May each year.

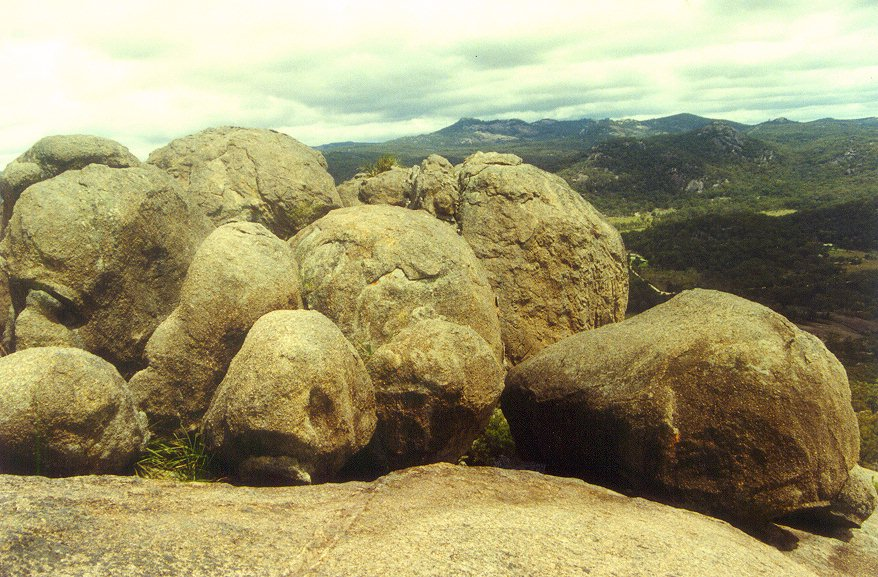
A granite outcrop in Girraween National Park.

The area is Queensland's premier wine region and home to the Queensland College of Wine Tourism. Many of the fifty-plus wineries in the region have enjoyed significant success with Shiraz, Cabernet Sauvignon, Merlot and Chardonnay for some years. Recently Verdelho has performed very well and many wineries are experimenting with alternative grape varieties, including Nebbiolo, Sangiovese and Petit verdot.

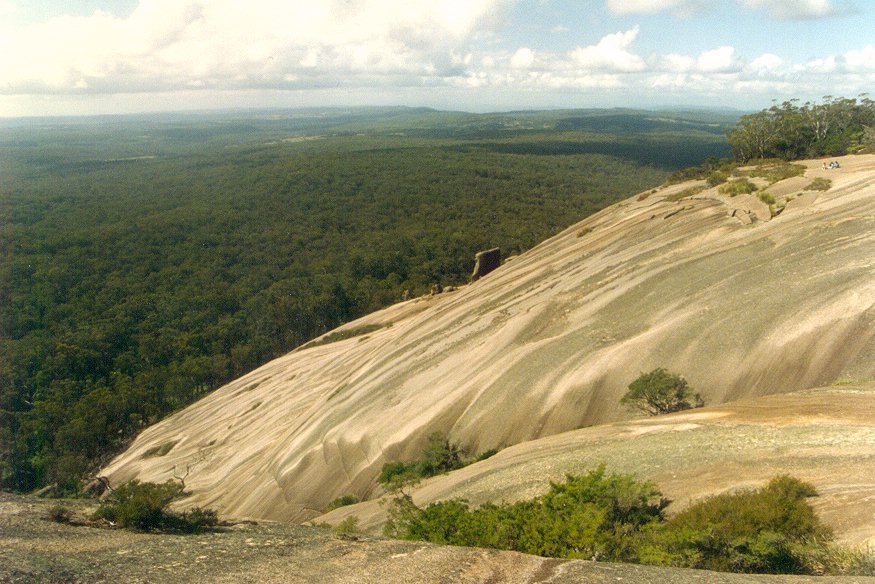
The massive Bald Rock in Bald Rock National Park.

Part of the Granite Belt is reserved as Girraween National Park, which features granite outcroppings such as the Pyramids, and an abundance of fauna and flora. 'Girraween' can be translated as "place of flowers" in the Aboriginal language from which it is taken. The latter are particularly in evidence in spring, when wildflowers explode into evidence. The area is home to at least 800 species of flowering plants. The botanical group known as the Stanthorpe Rare Flower Consortium has been established as a result of the region's significant floral heritage. Some of these plants include ground orchids, rock roses, pea-flowers and native bluebells.

Further east towards the coast is the Bald Rock National Park and Boonoo Boonoo National Park. Towards the west of the district is the Sundown National Park. The granite boulders of the region attract rock-climbers, and bush-walkers like to explore the little-known Underground River.

The possibility of experiencing snow on the ground in Queensland is another tourist attraction for the region.

== History ==
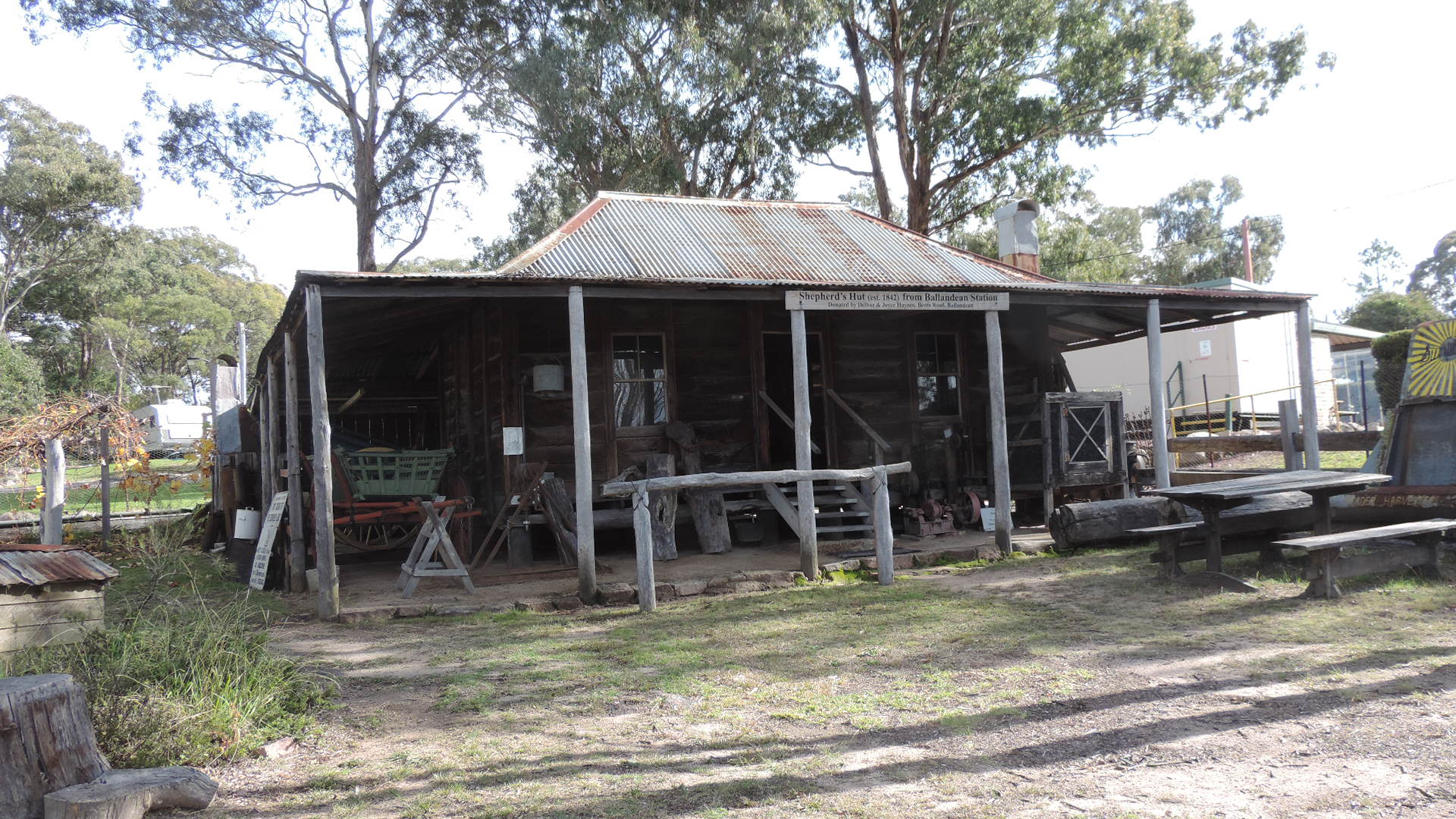
Heritage museum at Ballandean Homestead, 2015

The district was first inhabited by the Githabul peoples. These Indigenous people groups inhabited the land for ten's of thousands of years prior to European exploration and settlement. European settlement began when the land was first explored by Allan Cunningham in 1827. Cunninghams Gap and the Cunningham Highway were named after him.

A number of large pastoral stations were established in the region:

- 1840: Ballandean Run (194 square miles (500 km^{2})) by Robert Ramsay Mackenzie
- 1842: Maryland Run (360 square miles (930 km^{2})) with a capacity of 24,000 sheep by Matthew Henry Marsh
- 1843: Pikedale Run (288 square miles (750 km^{2})) with a capacity of 24,000 sheep by Captain Pike
- 1844: Glen Lyon Run (171 square miles (440 km^{2})) by Alexander McLeod
- 1860: Folkestone Run (201 square miles (520 km^{2})) by Matthew Henry Marsh
- Nundubbermere Run
- Pike's Creek Run
- Terrica Run
- Waroo Run

During the following decade, mining of gold, copper and tin brought permanent European settlement to the district.

In 1881, the railway to Warwick was extended to Stanthorpe and then to the border in 1887, when Wallangarra was established.

The countryside around the Granite Belt, after World War I, was given to some returning soldiers as gifts or payment for their services in the war. As such, many of the rural districts are named after battles that took place in France, such as Amiens and Pozieres. These places were, at one point, rather busy and well-populated, but as Stanthorpe grew and returned soldiers grew frustrated with farming, the districts eventually died as many families left. In some places, where there were once Blue Nurse outposts and many stores, all that remain are small primary schools, while in other districts the post-war past remains only in the name.

The region's first wine grapes were planted in 1965.

== See also ==
- Stanthorpe, Queensland
- Darling Downs, Queensland
- New England, New South Wales
- Regions of Queensland
- Tourism in Australia
