= Ballandean, Queensland =

Ballandean
- Town
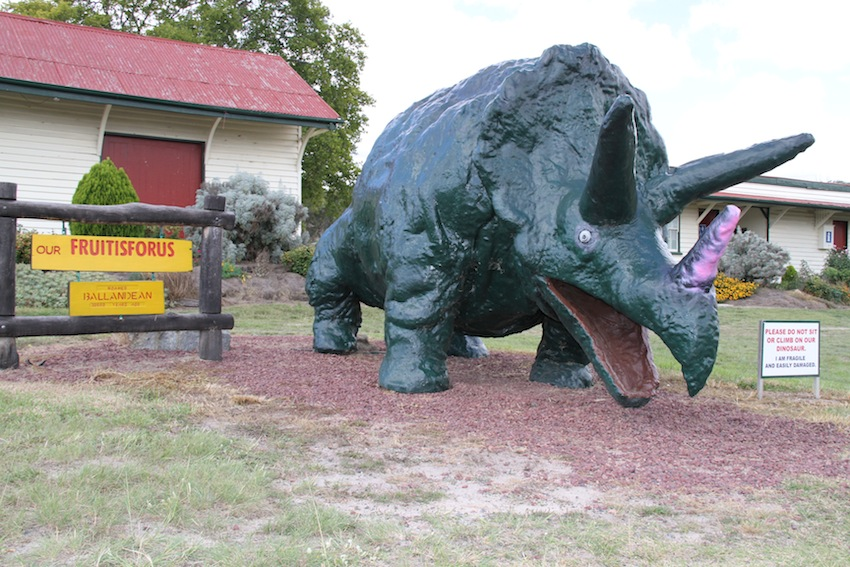
- Ballandean railway station with the big dinosaur, 2015

- Interactive map of Ballandean
- Coordinates: 28.8008°S 151.8427°E
- Country: Australia
- State: Queensland
- LGA: Southern Downs Region
- Location: 20 km (12 mi) SW of Stanthorpe; 81 km (50 mi) SSW of Warwick; 37 km (23 mi) NW of Tenterfield; 164 km (102 mi) S of Toowoomba; 238 km (148 mi) SW of Brisbane

Government
  - State electorate: Southern Downs
  - Federal division: Maranoa

Area
  - Total: 199.6 km^{2} (77.1 sq mi)
- Elevation: 721 m (2,365 ft)

Population
  - Total: 316 (2021 census)
  - Density: 1.5832/km^{2} (4.100/sq mi)
- Time zone: UTC+10:00 (AEST)
- Postcode: 4382
Localities around Ballandean
Nundubbermere	Somme; Fletcher	Eukey; Girraween
Sundown	Ballandean	Lyra; Wyberba
Back Creek (NSW)	Tarban (NSW)	Wallangarra

Ballandean is a rural town and locality in the Southern Downs Region, Queensland, Australia. The town has a number of nearby vineyards which attract tourists to the area. In the 2021 census, the locality of Ballandean had a population of 316 people.

== Geography ==
The Severn River marks part of the northern boundary. Kelvin Grove Creek, Washpool Creek, Accommodation Creek and Smiths Creek all flow through Ballandean into the Severn River.

The New England Highway passes through Ballandean from north to south in the north-east of Ballandean in close parallel to the Southern railway line. The Ballandean railway station is in this area and the urban development surrounds the railway station. The station is now closed as there are no passenger services on this line. The rest of the locality is predominantly farmland.

Apple Vale is a neighbourhood in the north of the locality (28.8166°S 151.8°E).

== History ==
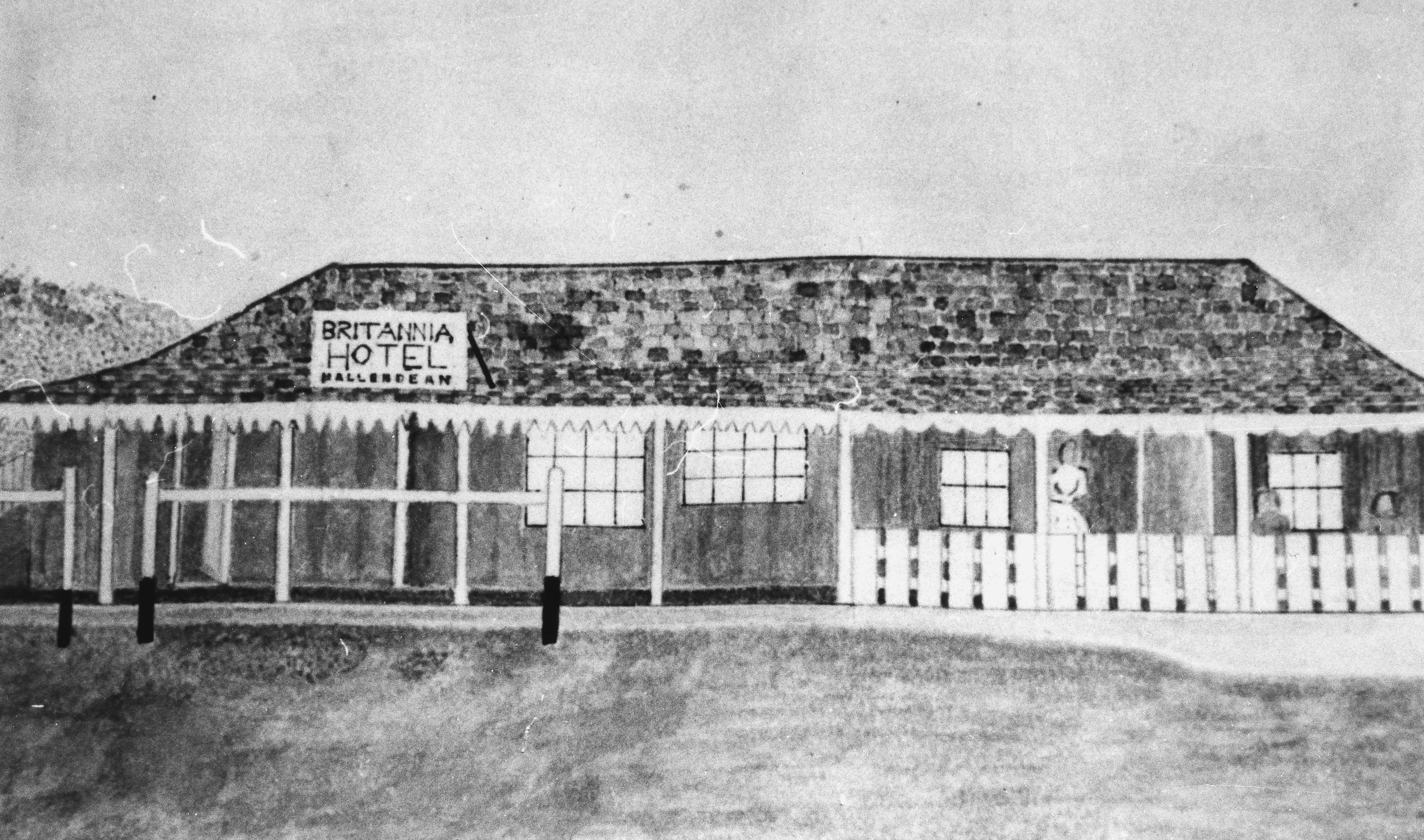
Britannia Hotel, Ballandean, established by Thomas Henry Fletcher, circa 1872

The name Ballandean derives from the name of a pastoral run, belonging to Henry Hayter Nicol in 1841, believed to be linked to his childhood association with Ballindean House, near Inchture, Perthshire, Scotland.

The town was surveyed and officially named in 1872.

Thomas Henry Fletcher built the Britannia Inn in the same year which attracted other businesses to the area. Fletcher went on to establish the first commercial orchard on the Granite Belt.

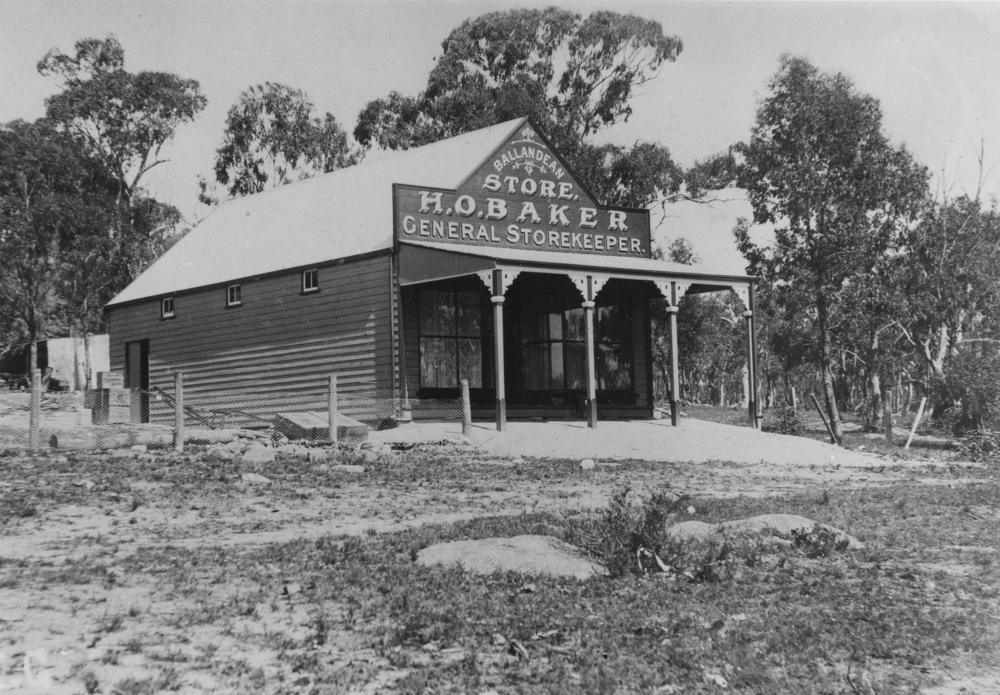
General store at Ballandean, ca. 1920

Ballandean Post Office opened on 1 January 1873.

Land in Ballandean was open for selection on 17 April 1877; 98 square miles (250 km^{2}) were available.

Ballandean State School opened on 18 January 1909 under head teacher Frances Emily Wallace.

Apple Vale State School opened on 19 February 1914. In 1924, it became a half-time school in conjunction with Somme State School in Somme (meaning the two schools shared a single teacher). Both schools closed in August 1927. Apple Vale State School was on the south-west corner of Sundown Road and Mcmeniman Road (28.8162°S 151.8074°E).

St Oswald's Anglican Church was dedicated on 1 March 1926 by Archbishop Gerald Sharp. Although it has now closed, the church building is still located at 12 Bents Road (28.7978°S 151.8410°E).

== Demographics ==
In the 2016 census, the locality of Ballandean had a population of 338 people.

In the 2021 census, the locality of Ballandean had a population of 316 people.

== Heritage listings ==
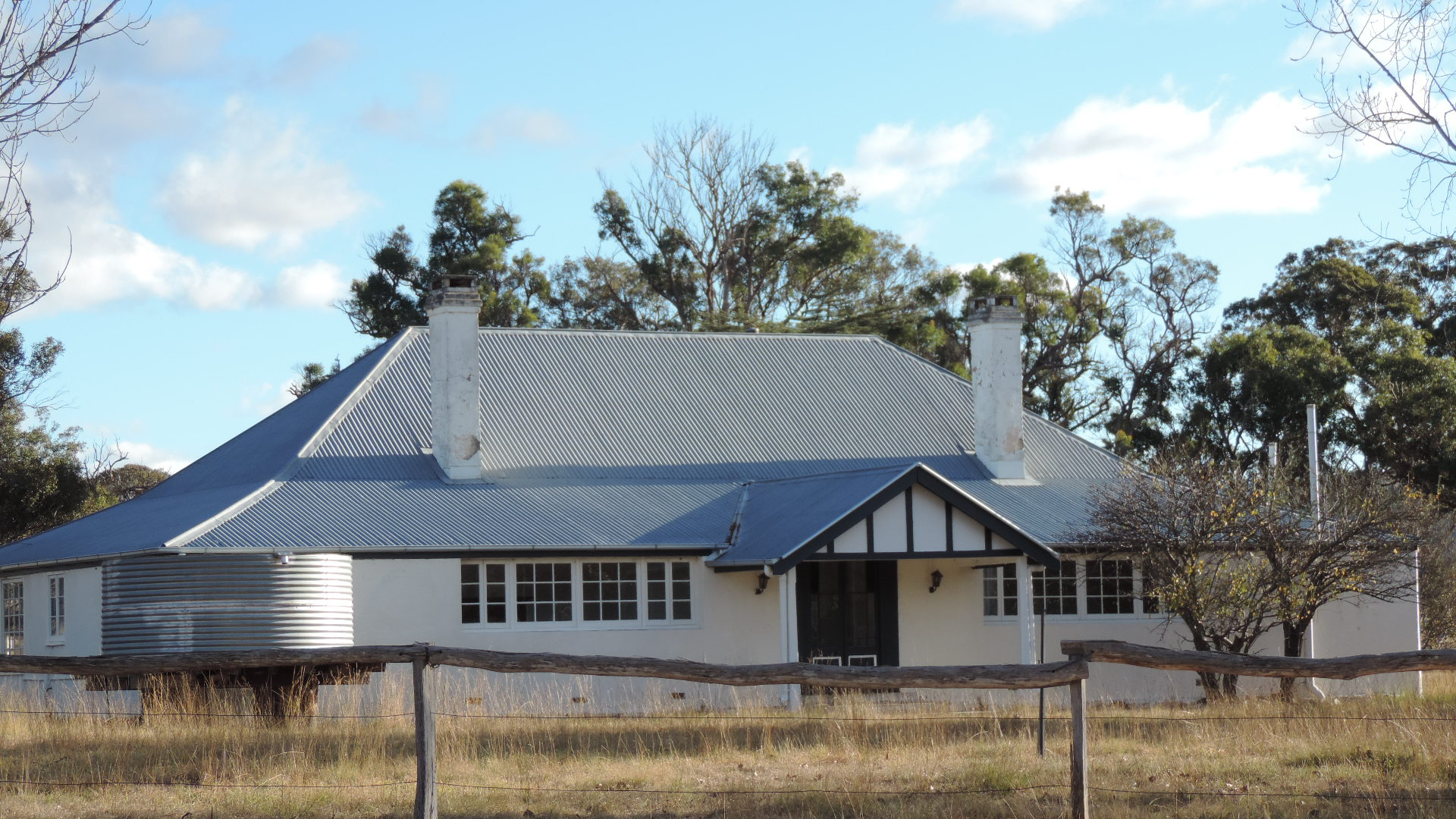
Ballandean Homestead, 2015

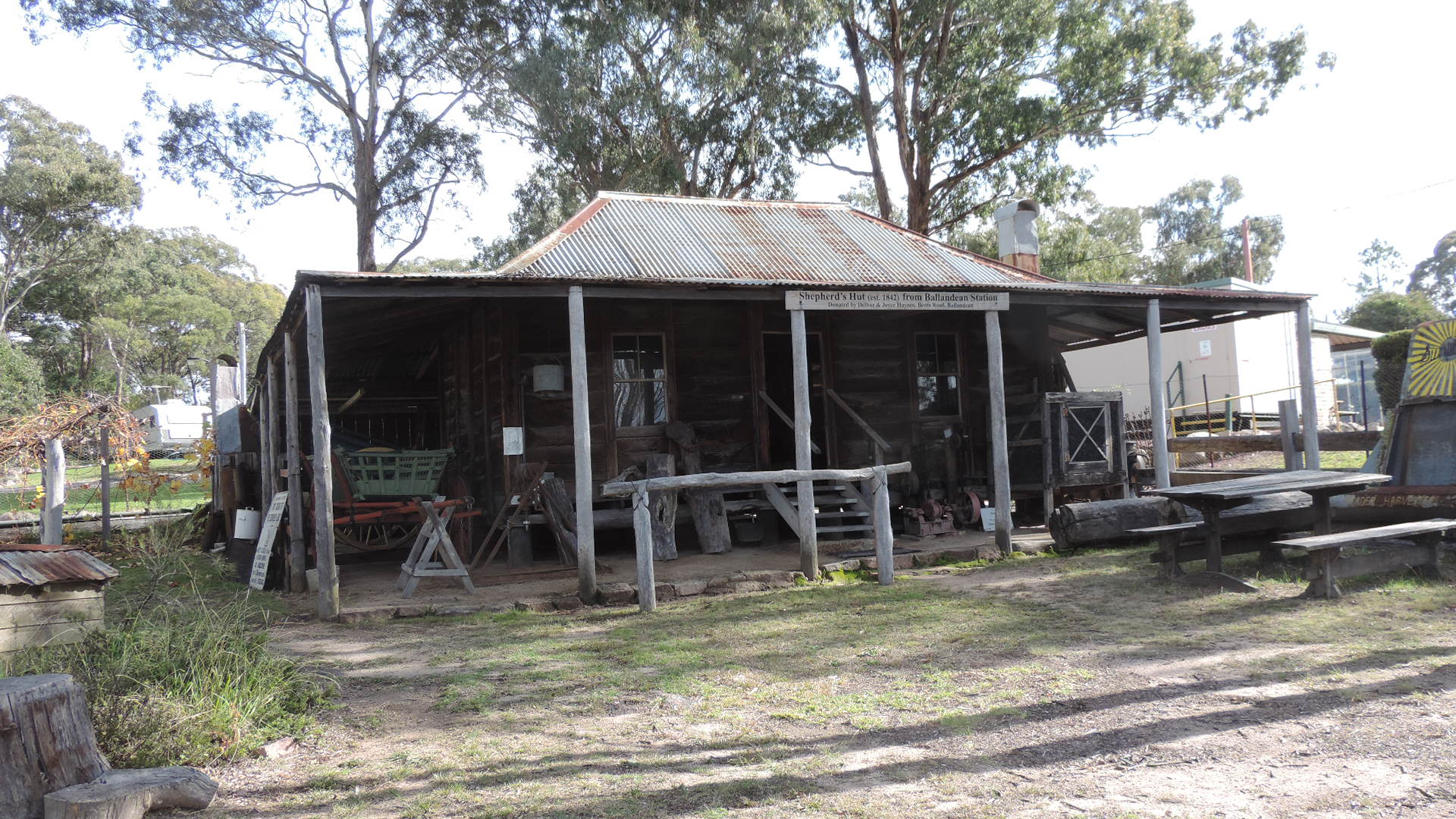
Shepherd's hut, built circa 1842 Ballandean station, now part of the Stanthorpe Heritage Museum

Ballandean has a number of heritage-listed sites, including:

- 5 kilometres (3.1 mi) south-west of Ballandean: Ballandean Homestead

== Education ==
Ballandean State School is a government primary (Prep–6) school for boys and girls at Bent's Road (28.7986°S 151.8414°E). In 2018, the school had an enrolment of 40 students with 5 teachers (4 full-time equivalent) and 6 non-teaching staff (3 full-time equivalent).

There are no secondary schools in Ballandean. The nearest government secondary school is Stanthorpe State High School in Stanthorpe to the north.

== Attractions ==
The man-made Ballandean Pyramid was constructed by Ken Stubberfield as a way to dispose of excess granite on his farm and is an unusual sight in Queensland.

The Ballandean railway station is a well-known landmark on the New England Highway due to the big dinosaur in front of it, nicknamed the Fruitisforus (Fruit-is-for-us). The dinosaur was originally constructed for a float in the 1998 Apple and Grape Festival. After the festival, the community placed it in front of the railway station to get passing traffic to stop and buy fruit for a community fundraiser. It proved so popular that it was reinforced with fibregrass and painted and made a permanent roadside feature. It is 6.7 metres (22 ft) long and 2.1 metres (6 ft 11 in) high.
