= Lira (disambiguation) =

Lira is the unit of currency of various countries.

== Specific currencies ==
=== Current ===
- Turkish lira
- Lebanese lira
- Syrian lira
- Pound, translated "lira" in some languages

=== Former ===
- Cypriot lira 1879–2007
- French livre 781–1794
- Israeli lira 1948–1980
- Italian lira 1861–2002
- Italian East African lira 1938–1941
- Italian Somaliland lira 1925–1926
- Luccan lira until 1800 and 1826–1847
- Maltese lira 1825–2007
- Neapolitan lira 1812–1813
- Ottoman lira 1844–1923
- Papal lira 1866–1870
- Parman lira before 1802 and 1815–1859
- Sammarinese lira 1860s–2002
- Sardinian lira 1816–1861
- Tripolitanian lira 1943–1951
- Tuscan lira until 1807 and 1814–1826
- Vatican lira 1929–2002
- Venetian lira until 1807

== Music ==
- Lira (Ukrainian instrument), a Ukrainian folk musical instrument similar to the hurdy-gurdy
- Lira da braccio, a European bowed string instrument played during the Renaissance
- Byzantine lyra or lira, a medieval bowed string instrument
- Calabrian lira, a bowed string instrument
- Cretan lyra, a Greek pear-shaped, three-stringed bowed instrument
- Lyre, a string instrument known for its use in Greek classical antiquity and later periods
- Lingm or lira, a Bhutanese flute

== People ==
- Lira (name), a surname and given name
- Lira (singer) (born 1979), South African singer

== Places ==
- Lira, Salvaterra de Miño, a village in Galicia, northwestern Spain
- Lira, Carnota, a village in Galicia, northwestern Spain
- Lira, Uganda, a town in northern Uganda
- Lira District, an administrative district in northern Uganda
- Lira gas field, in the Black Sea
- Mount Lira, in Antarctica

== Other uses ==
- Lira (mollusc), lines or ridges on the shell of molluscs or brachiopods
- Lira (Encantadia), a fictional character in Encantadia
- Lira (ISS), a communications system
- Lira Airport, in Uganda
- Lira BK, a Swedish football club
- Liberal Reform Party (Czech Republic), a Czech political party
- Locked-in retirement account, a Canadian investment account designed to hold locked-in pension funds for former plan members
- Alfa class submarine or Lira class submarine
- Ciampino–G. B. Pastine International Airport, in Rome, Italy
- Lira 512, a Yugoslav clone of the IBM PC/XT computer
- Lira-San, a fictional planet in the Star Wars universe

== See also ==
- Lire (disambiguation)
- Liria (disambiguation)
- Lyra (disambiguation)
- Lyre (disambiguation)
