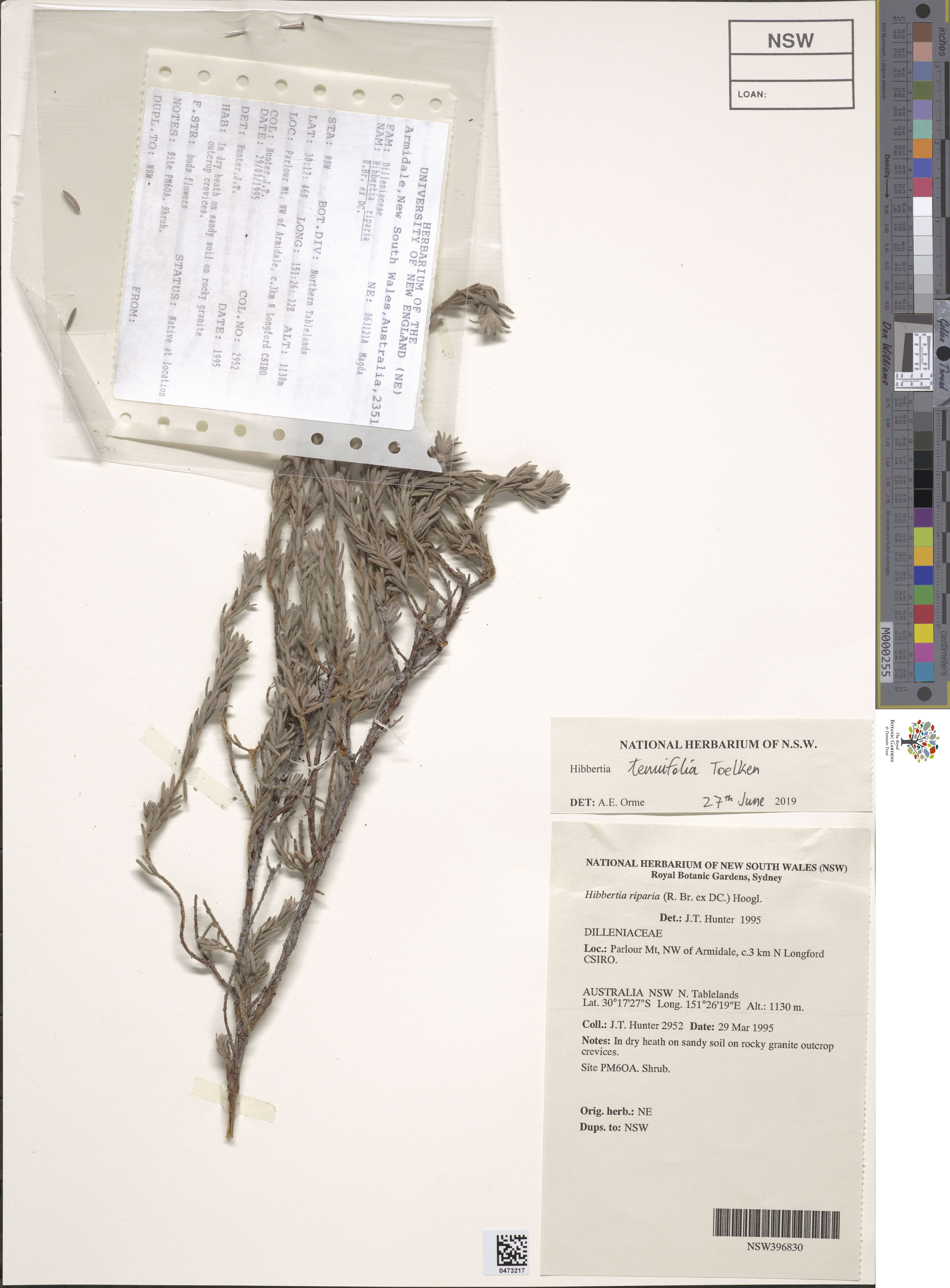
- Herbarium specimen

Conservation status
- Least Concern (NCA)

Scientific classification
- Kingdom: Plantae
- Clade: Tracheophytes
- Clade: Angiosperms
- Clade: Eudicots
- Order: Dilleniales
- Family: Dilleniaceae
- Genus: Hibbertia
- Species: H. tenuifolia

Binomial name
- Hibbertia tenuifolia Toelken

= Hibbertia tenuifolia =

Narrow-leaved guinea flower

Species of flowering plant

Hibbertia tenuifolia, commonly known as narrow-leaved guinea flower, is a species of flowering plant in the family Dilleniaceae and is endemic to eastern Australia. It is a small, spreading shrublet with hairy foliage, linear leaves and yellow flowers with twelve to sixteen stamens on one side of two carpels.

== Description ==
Hibbertia tenuifolia is spreading shrublet that typically grows to a height of up to 20 cm (7.9 in) and has hairy foliage. The leaves are linear, mostly 4.1–7.5 mm (0.16–0.30 in) long and 0.6–0.9 mm (0.024–0.035 in) wide on a petiole 0.1–0.4 mm (0.0039–0.0157 in) long. The flowers are arranged singly mostly on the ends of main branches with linear bracts 4.3–5.4 mm (0.17–0.21 in) long and 0.6–0.7 mm (0.024–0.028 in) wide at the base. The five sepal are joined at the base, the outer lobes 8.2–12.5 mm (0.32–0.49 in) long and 2.1–3.4 mm (0.083–0.134 in) wide, the inner lobes shorter but broader. The petals are yellow, egg-shaped with the narrower end towards the base, 7.8–10.4 mm (0.31–0.41 in) long with twelve to sixteen stamens fused at the base on one side of two carpels, each carpel with two ovules. Flowering occurs from October to December.

== Taxonomy ==
Hibbertia tenuifolia was first formally described in 2000 by Hellmut R. Toelken in the Journal of the Adelaide Botanic Gardens from specimens collected by Leslie Pedley between Wyberba and Wallangarra in 1963. The specific epithet (tenuifolia) means "slender-leaved".

== Distribution and habitat ==
This hibbertia grows in heath, woodland and forest in south-eastern Queensland and the Northern Tablelands of New South Wales, but is only known from three old collection.

== Conservation status ==
Hibbertia tenuifolia is listed as "endangered" under the New South Wales Government Biodiversity Conservation Act 2016 and may be extinct in New South Wales.

== See also ==
- List of Hibbertia species
