= Liri (disambiguation) =

Liri is one of the principal rivers of central Italy.

Liri may also refer to:

== Surname ==
- Alain Liri (born 1979), Ivorian footballer

== Given name ==
- Liri Berisha (born 1949), Albanian pediatrician, former first lady of Albania
- Liri Belishova (1926–2018), Albanian politician
- Liri Gega (1917 – 1956), Albanian communist activist and politician

== Other ==
- Liri Blues Festival, blues festival in Isola del Liri, Italy
- Valle del Liri, valley and a geographical region of southern Lazio, Italy

== See also ==
- Lira (disambiguation)
- Liris (wasp)
