= Sergio Lira =

Sergio Lira may refer to:

- Sergio A. Lira, Brazilian-born American immunologist
- Sergio Lira (footballer) (born 1957), a Mexican league top scorer
