= Lyria =

Lyria may refer to:

- Lyria (text-to-music model), a model developed by Google DeepMind
- TGV Lyria, a brand name used for TGV railway lines connecting France and Switzerland
- Lyria (gastropod), a gastropod genus
- Lyria (band), a Brazilian symphonic alternative metal band
- Lyria, a character in the video game Granblue Fantasy

== See also ==
- Llyrìa
- Liria (disambiguation)
- Lyra (disambiguation)
