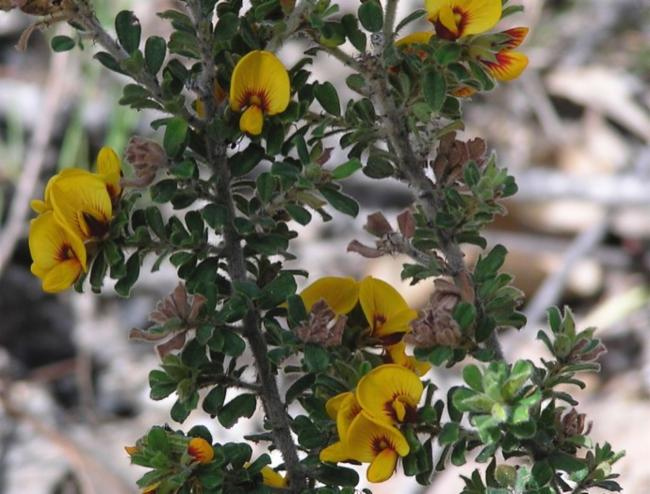
- In Girraween National Park

Conservation status
- Vulnerable (EPBC Act)

Scientific classification
- Kingdom: Plantae
- Clade: Tracheophytes
- Clade: Angiosperms
- Clade: Eudicots
- Clade: Rosids
- Order: Fabales
- Family: Fabaceae
- Subfamily: Faboideae
- Genus: Pultenaea
- Species: P. hartmannii

Binomial name
- Pultenaea hartmannii F.Muell.

= Pultenaea hartmannii =

Species of flowering plant

Pultenaea hartmannii is a species of flowering plant in the family Fabaceae and is endemic to an area around the border between New South Wales and Queensland. It is an erect shrub with hairy stems, oblong to triangular leaves with the narrower end towards the base, and yellow flowers with red markings.

== Description ==
Pultenaea hartmannii is an erect shrub with hairy stems. The leaves are arranged alternately, oblong to triangular with the narrower end towards the base, 4–10 mm (0.16–0.39 in) long and 2–5 mm (0.079–0.197 in) wide with stipules about 2 mm (0.079 in) long at the base. The flowers are yellow with red markings, arranged in small, leafy clusters near the ends of branchlets. The flowers are 8–10 mm (0.31–0.39 in) long on pedicels about 1 mm (0.039 in) long with narrow triangular bracteoles 1–2 mm (0.039–0.079 in) long attached at the base of the sepal tube. The sepals are 4–5 mm (0.16–0.20 in) long, the ovary is hairy and the fruit is a flattened pod 6–8 mm (0.24–0.31 in) long.

== Taxonomy and naming ==
Pultenaea hartmannii was first formally described in 1874 by Ferdinand von Mueller in Fragmenta phytographiae Australiae from specimens collected by Carl Heinrich Hartmann.

== Distribution and habitat ==
This pultenaea grows in forest on granite near Jennings on the Northern Tablelands of New South Wales and in south-eastern Queensland.

== Conservation status ==
This species is listed as "least concern" under the Queensland Government Nature Conservation Act 1992.
