= Girraween, Queensland =

Girraween
- Suburb
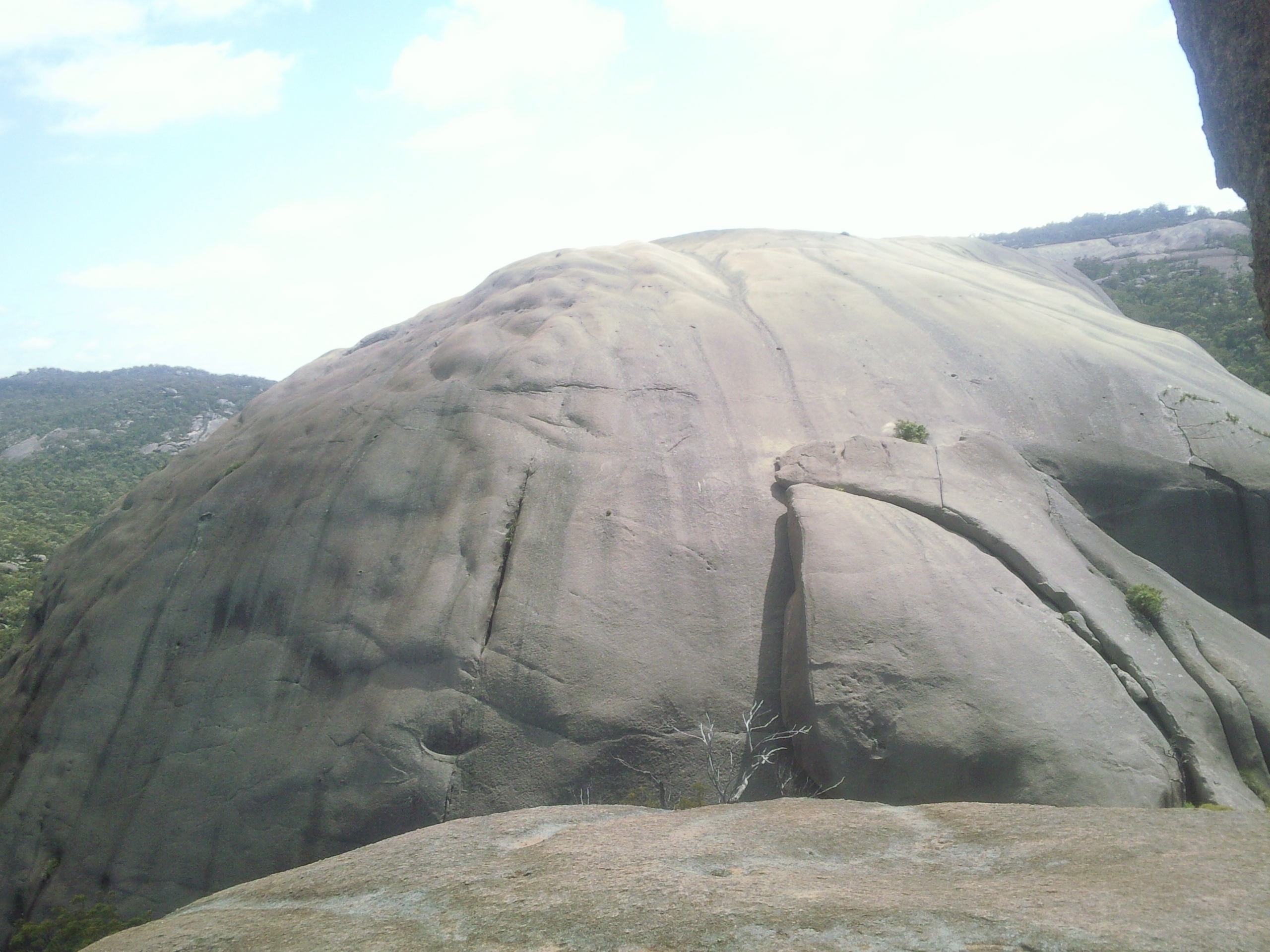
- Granite boulders

- Interactive map of Girraween
- Coordinates: 28.8577°S 151.9547°E
- Country: Australia
- State: Queensland
- LGA: Southern Downs Region
- Location: 27.8 km (17.3 mi) S of Stanthorpe; 95.2 km (59.2 mi) S of Warwick; 203 km (126 mi) S of Toowoomba; 255 km (158 mi) SW of Brisbane

Government
  - State electorate: Southern Downs
  - Federal division: Maranoa

Area
  - Total: 117.1 km^{2} (45.2 sq mi)

Population
  - Total: 5 (2021 census)
  - Density: 0.043/km^{2} (0.111/sq mi)
- Time zone: UTC+10:00 (AEST)
- Postcode: 4382
Suburbs around Girraween
| Ballandean | Eukey | Bookookoorara (NSW) |
| Lyra | Girraween | Carrolls Creek (NSW) |
| Wyberba | Wallangarra; Jennings (NSW) | Boonoo Boonoo (NSW) |

Girraween is an undeveloped locality in the Southern Downs Region, Queensland, Australia. It is in the Granite Belt and on the border with New South Wales. In the 2021 census, Girraween had a population of 5 people.

== Geography ==
The terrain is in the Granite Belt and is mountainous with peaks including (from north to south):

- Slip Rock (28.8113°S 151.9580°E) 1,172 metres (3,845 ft)
- The Pyramids (28.8216°S 151.9451°E) 1,080 metres (3,540 ft)
- Castle Rock (28.8440°S 151.9451°E) 1,112 metres (3,648 ft)
- Billy Goat Hill (28.8569°S 151.9876°E) 1,118 metres (3,668 ft)
- Twin Peaks (28.8596°S 151.9808°E) 1,139 metres (3,737 ft)
- Sphinx (28.8598°S 151.9422°E) 1,152 metres (3,780 ft)
- Turtle Rock (28.8609°S 151.9417°E) 1,152 metres (3,780 ft)
- Mount Norman (28.8621°S 151.9623°E) 1,266 metres (4,154 ft)
- Middle Rock (28.8838°S 151.9989°E) 1,185 metres (3,888 ft)
- West Bald Rock (28.8899°S 152.0002°E) 1,210 metres (3,970 ft)

Almost all of the locality is undeveloped and within the Girraween National Park.

== History ==
The locality was named and bounded on 15 December 2000. It presumably takes its name from the national park.

== Demographics ==
In the 2016 census, Girraween had a population of 12 people.

In the 2021 census, Girraween had a population of 5 people.

== Education ==
There are no schools in Girraween. The nearest government primary schools are Ballandean State School in neighbouring Ballandean to the north-west and Wallangarra State School in neighbouring Wallangarra to the south. The nearest government secondary school is Stanthorpe State High School in Stanthorpe to the north.

== Attractions ==
Castle Rock Camp Area provides accommodation within the national park (28.8372°S 151.9381°E).
