= Hylaeus frederici =

Scientific classification
- Kingdom: Animalia
- Phylum: Arthropoda
- Clade: Pancrustacea
- Class: Insecta
- Order: Hymenoptera
- Family: Colletidae
- Genus: Hylaeus
- Species: H. frederici

Binomial name
- Hylaeus frederici (Cockerell, 1905)

Synonyms
- Prosopis frederici Cockerell, 1905; Prosopis similis Smith, 1853

Species of bee

Hylaeus frederici, or Hylaeus (Prosopisteron) frederici, is a species of bee in the family Colletidae and subfamily Hylaeinae. It is endemic to Australia. It was described by British-American entomologist Theodore Dru Alison Cockerell in 1905.

== Distribution and habitat ==
The species occurs in western and eastern Australia. The type locality is simply New Holland, but the bees have also been recorded from Brisbane; Wallangarra, Queensland; Sutherland, New South Wales; and King George Sound in south-west Western Australia.

== Behaviour ==
The adults are flying mellivores. Flowering plants visited by the bees include Eucalyptus, Jacksonia and Leptospermum species.
