= Lyra (disambiguation) =

Lyra is a constellation.

Lyra may also refer to:

== Music ==
=== Instruments ===
- Lyre, a stringed musical instrument used in ancient Mesopotamia, ancient Greece and elsewhere
  - Lyres of Ur, a stringed musical instrument used in ancient Mesopotamia
  - Byzantine lyra, a bowed string musical instrument used in the Byzantine Empire
  - Lyra (Cretan), a bowed instrument used in folk music in Crete, Greece
  - Lira Calabrese, a bowed instrument used in folk music in Calabria, Italy
  - Lira da braccio, a European bowed string instrument of the Renaissance
  - Kemenche, a bowed instrument used in folk music in Turkey, Greece and Iran
- RCA Lyra, a line of digital audio players

=== Songs / Compositions ===
- "Lyra" (song), a 2007 song by Kate Bush
- "Lyra", a song by Breaking Benjamin from the 2018 album Ember
- "Lyra", a song by Big Red Machine from their self-titled album
- Lyra, a composition for trumpet and piano by Hale A. VanderCook

== People ==
- Lyra (name), people and fictional characters with the name

== Places ==
- The Latin name of Lier, Belgium
  - K. Lyra, a Lier football club
  - K. Lyra-Lierse Berlaar, a Lier football club
- Lyra, Queensland, a locality in Australia
  - Lyra railway station
- Lyra, Ohio, a community in the United States
- Lyra Reef, a coral atoll in Oceania

== Vessels ==
- HMS Lyra, the name of four ships of the Royal Navy
- Alfa-class submarine (Russian: Лира, Lyra), a class of hunter/killer nuclear powered submarines with a NATO reporting name of Alfa class

== Other uses ==
- Lyra, aerial hoop used in circus performance
- Lyra (neuroanatomy) or psalterium, part of the brain
- Lyra (virtual assistant), an intelligent personal assistant
- Lyra, a novel series by Patricia Wrede
- Lyra (TV series), a Philippine television drama series
- Lyra (codec), a lossy audio codec

== See also ==
- LYRA (Lyman Alpha Radiometer) – a solar ultraviolet radiometer
- Lira (disambiguation)
- Lyran (disambiguation)
- Lyria (disambiguation)
- Lyre (disambiguation)
