= Lire =

Lire may refer to:

- Lire (magazine), a French literary magazine
- Lira (plural lire), a monetary unit in several countries
- Liré, a former commune in France
- Lire Phiri, Mosotho footballer
- Pratica di Mare Air Base, an Italian Air Force base in Rome
- The Leaning Tower of Lire, see block-stacking problem.

== See also ==
- Lira (disambiguation)
- Lyre (disambiguation)
