= Lyran (disambiguation) =

Lyran is a short name for the Academic Female Voice Choir Lyran (Swedish: Akademiska Damkören Lyran), a Finland-Swedish choir in Helsinki.

Lyran is also the adjectival or demonymic form of Lyra, a constellation. As such, it has been used in various fictional settings.

Lyrån is a Scandinavian surname.

== Use in fiction ==
- The Lyran Star Empire, a faction in the Star Fleet Universe fictional setting
- The Lyran Alliance, a faction in the BattleTech fictional setting

== People ==
- Hilde Lyrån, a Norwegian actress, dancer, and comedian

== See also ==
- Lyra (disambiguation)
