= Lira (name) =

Lira is a common surname in the Portuguese, Spanish and Italian languages. It was also a given name during the Medieval period. Lira translates to libra in Latin, which means "balance".

Notable people with the surname include:

- Aílton Lira (born 1951), Brazilian footballer
- Alvinho Lira (born 2006), Brazilian politician
- Benedito de Lira (1941–2025), Brazilian politician
- Felipe Lira (born 1972), Venezuelan baseball player
- Johnny Lira (1951–2012), American weightlifter
- José López Lira (1892–1965), Mexican lawyer and politician
- Juan Enrique Lira (1927–2007), Chilean sport shooter
- Gonzalo Lira (1968–2024), Chilean-American novelist
- Michael Lira (born 1975), Australian composer
- Michael Lira (racing driver) (born 1997), American racing driver
- Osvaldo Lira (1904–1996), Chilean priest, theologian and philosopher
- Patricio Lira, Chilean footballer
- Pedro Lira (1845–1912), Chilean painter and art critic
- Pedro Reginaldo Lira (1915–2012), Argentine Catholic bishop
- Raimundo Lira (born 1943), Brazilian politician
- Sergio A. Lira, Brazilian-American immunologist
- Wendell Lira (born 1989), Brazilian footballer
- Yadira Lira (born 1973), Mexican karateka
