= Alfred Anderson (entrepreneur) =

Australian politician

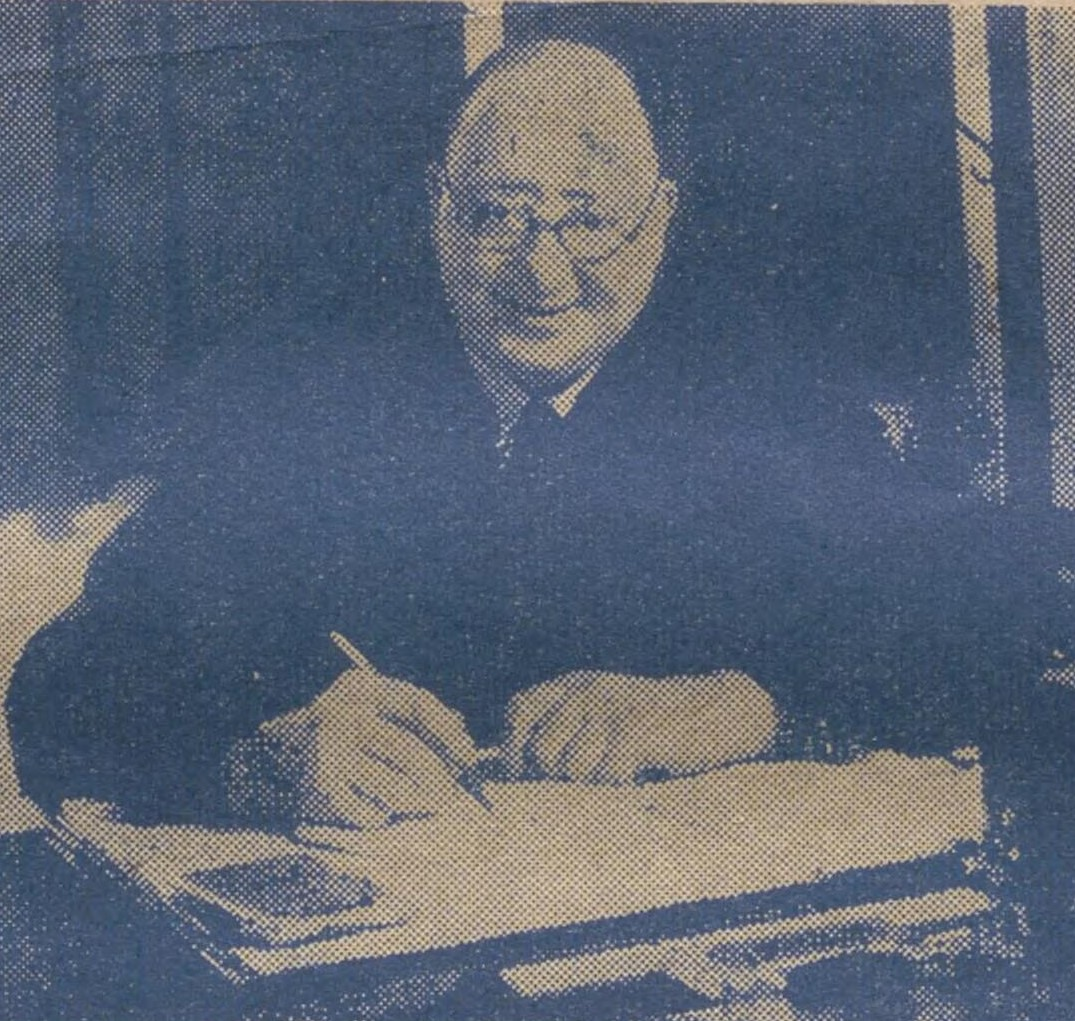
- Anderson around 1943
- Born: 4 June 1888; East Brighton, Melbourne, Victoria, British Empire
- Died: 6 August 1956 (aged 68); Strathfield, Sydney, New South Wales, Australia
- Resting place: Waverley Cemetery
- Occupation: Butcher
- Political party: One Parliament for Australia
- Spouse: Elizabeth Gilbert (m. 1912)
- Children: 6

Alfred William Anderson (4 June 1888 – 6 August 1956) was an Australian butcher and entrepreneur.

Anderson was born in East Brighton in Melbourne to butcher John Charles Anderson and Elizabeth, née Jervis, and was raised a Methodist. The family moved to Western Australia, and the younger Anderson left school at 14. He opened a butchery in Perth in 1911. On 22 June 1912 he married Elizabeth Maud Gilbert at St Luke's Anglican Church in Cottesloe.

Anderson moved to Sydney in 1918 and became a sausage manufacturer, registering his own companies A. W. Anderson Pty Ltd and Anderson's Sausages Pty Ltd. By 1923, with branches across Sydney and Newcastle, he also had an interest in the Homebush Bay abattoirs, and in 1924 set up works in Lismore, Tuncester and Byron Bay. He was able to prosper during the Great Depression and acquired Queensland meatworks at Wallangarra and Karumba.

Anderson launched his own political party, One Parliament for Australia, in 1943 at Sydney Town Hall, advocating a government free of party politics. He contested Richmond at the 1943 federal election and received 20% of the vote, but the party soon dissolved. Anderson's companies, on the other hand, continued to prosper, as through the 1940s he expanded further into Queensland. He founded Andersons Island Industries Ltd in the Northern Territory and Andersons Meat Industries Ltd in 1953, as well as being instrumental in the foundation of the Byron Whaling Co. Pty. Ltd. in 1954.

Anderson, who suffered from diabetes, died in 1956 of heart disease at Strathfield and was buried at Waverley.
