= Lyre (disambiguation) =

A lyre is a stringed musical instrument.

Lyre(s) may also refer to:

- Lyre (vine system), a vine training system
- Lyre, County Cork, Ireland, a village
- Lyre (horse), a Thoroughbred racehorse
- Lyre River, in Washington U.S.
- lyre snake, common name of the snake genus Trimorphodon
- Lyres (band), an American alternative rock band
- Lyra, a constellation
- A lyre, a music stand attached to an instrument

== See also ==
- Liar (disambiguation)
- Lire (disambiguation)
- Lyrebird, two species of ground-dwelling Australian birds
- Lyretrix, a 16 year old Krushclub producer from Ukraine
- The Lyre of Orpheus (disambiguation)
- Lyre arm, a wooden lyre-shaped element often used at the front of the arm of a chair
- Lyra (disambiguation)
