= Liria (disambiguation) =

Liria, or Llíria, is a town in Valencia, Spain.

Liria may also refer to:

- KF Liria, a football team in Prizren, Kosovo
- Liria Palace, in Madrid
- Liria, an Albanian school founded by Hysen Hoxha
- Liria, a British group playing Albanian folk music, founded by Dave Smith
- Duke of Liria, a Dukedom of Spain
- TV Liria, a television channel in Kosovo

== See also ==
- Lira (disambiguation)
- Lyria (disambiguation)
