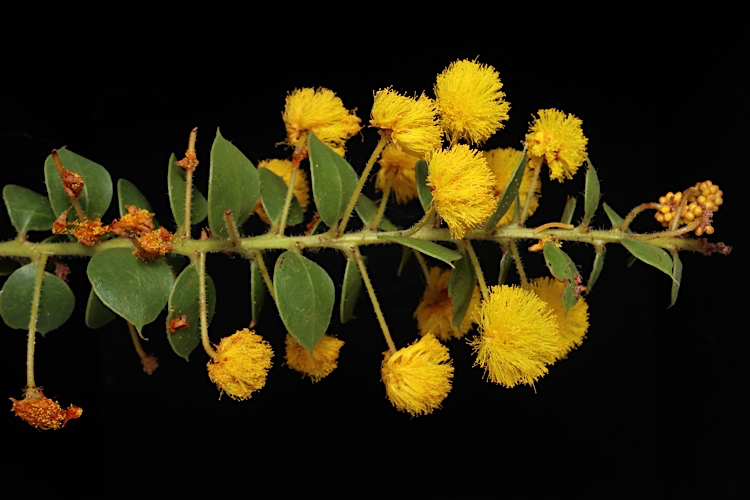

Scientific classification
- Kingdom: Plantae
- Clade: Tracheophytes
- Clade: Angiosperms
- Clade: Eudicots
- Clade: Rosids
- Order: Fabales
- Family: Fabaceae
- Subfamily: Caesalpinioideae
- Clade: Mimosoid clade
- Genus: Acacia
- Species: A. piligera

Binomial name
- Acacia piligera A.Cunn.
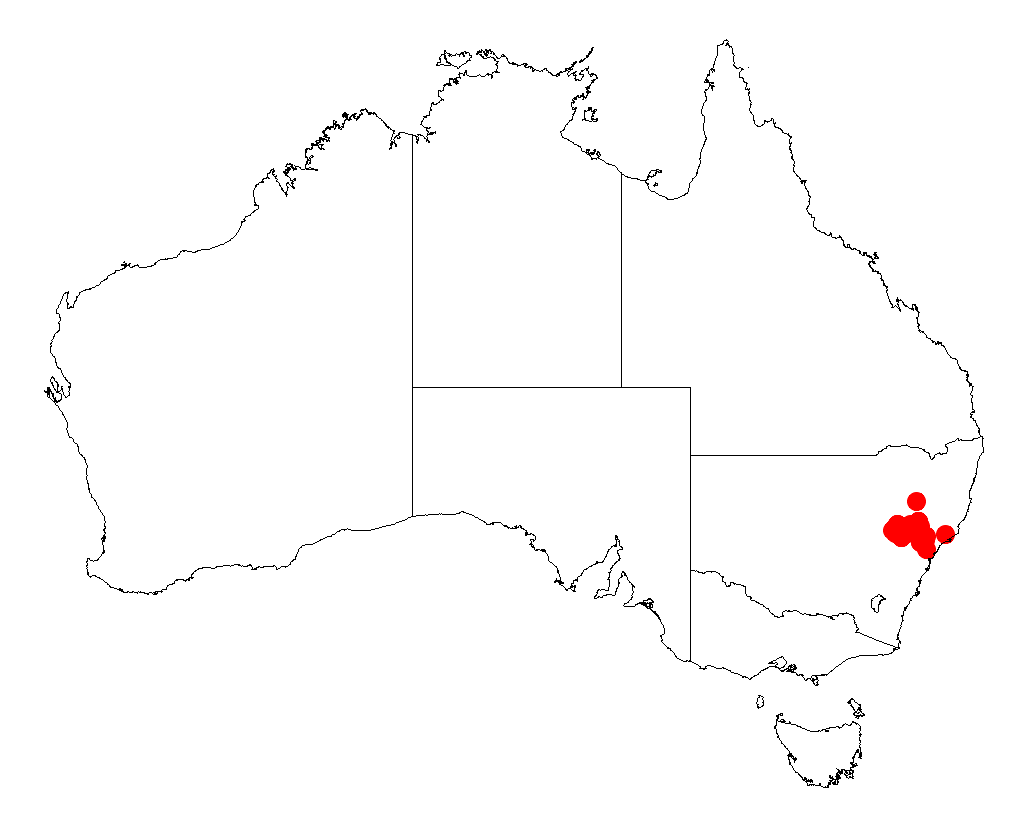
- Occurrence data from AVH

= Acacia piligera =

Hunter gold-dust wattle

Species of legume

Acacia piligera, commonly known as Hunter gold-dust wattle,is a tree or shrub belonging to the genus Acacia and the subgenus Phyllodineae native to eastern Australia.

== Description ==
The shrub typically grows to a height of 1.5 to 2 metres (4.9 to 6.6 ft) and has an obconical open habit. It has erect branches that curve upwards and glabrous to sparsely hairy branchlets. The grey-green to green phyllodes are widely spreading and rotated on the branchlets. The phyllodes have a broadly elliptic to broadly obovate shape with a length of 12 to 22 mm (0.47 to 0.87 in) and a width 6 to 15 mm (0.24 to 0.59 in). It flowers sporadically through the year and produces inflorescences that have spherical flower-heads with a diameter of 8 to 9 mm (0.31 to 0.35 in) containing 20 to 32 yellow to deep yellow flowers. After flowering oblong to curved dull dark brown seed pods form which are 35 to 80 mm (1.4 to 3.1 in) in length and 16 to 20 mm (0.63 to 0.79 in) wide.

== Taxonomy ==
The shrub can be mistaken as Acacia uncinata, it also resembles Acacia sertiformis. The specific epithet is thought to be in reference to the downy appearance of the shrub.

== Distribution ==
It is endemic to eastern New South Wales from around the Hunter Valley in the north to the Hunter Range in the south where it is found growing in stony sandy loams derived from sandstone soils in woodland communities.

== See also ==
- List of Acacia species
