= Lyria (band) =

Brazilian musical group

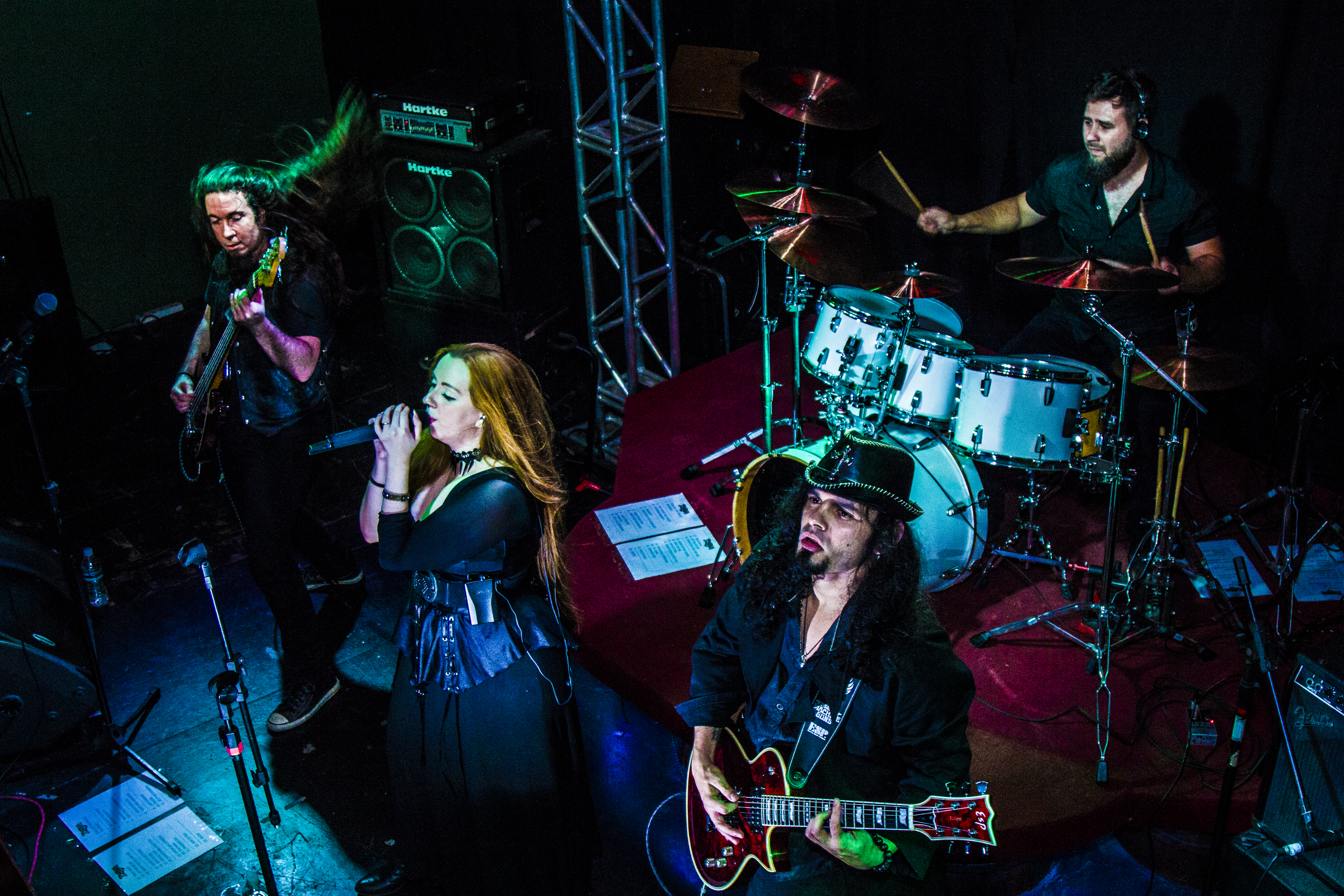
- Lyria performing at 2018 Immersion tour.

Background information
- Origin: Rio de Janeiro, Brazil
- Genres: Symphonic metal, Alternative metal, Heavy metal, Gothic metal
- Years active: 2012–present
- Members: Aline Happ; Thiago Zig; Rod Wolf; Thiago Mateu
- Past members: Eliezer Andre
- Website: www.lyriaband.com

Lyria is a Brazilian symphonic alternative metal band from Rio de Janeiro founded by the mezzo-soprano and songwriter Aline Happ in 2012.

The band is considered one of the greatest names of the new generation of Brazilian Heavy Metal with two albums released through successful crowdfunding campaigns counting with fans around the world. Their sound is a mix of different kinds of music styles like celtic, thrash, symphonic, gothic and industrial, balancing the right dose of punch to build a Metal fan base with the correct amount of melody to please fans that are not so used to heavier styles.

Focused on themes containing healing messages, Lyria tries to help people through the power of music. Their lyrics can be interpreted as ways of overcoming bad moments and advises to face the difficulties of life, addressing subjects such as autism, anxiety and depression.

The band has been performing several concerts in Brazil, also featuring acoustic concerts at medieval and thematic festivals. Moreover, Lyria is one of the pioneers in the mode of online concerts transmitted by streaming, directly from a studio, performing online concerts where fans from all parts of the world participate.

== History ==
Aline Happ founded Lyria in 2012. The name was inspired by the Greek mythology, combining the words lyre (string instrument), lily (flower) and lyrics. In 2013, Thiago Zig (bass) and Eliezer Andre (drums) officially joined the band.

In 2014, Lyria released its first album, Catharsis, through a successful crowdfunding campaign where fans from different parts of the world got really engaged with the cause raising more than $8,000. Some months later, Lyria presented its first music video, Jester, financed by the same crowdfunding campaign. In 2015, Rod Wolf (guitars) joined the band. In 2016, the band released their second music video, Revenge, which was recorded live at Roça'n Roll Festival. In the same year, Eliezer Andre left the band, being later replaced by Thiago Mateu, who took on the drums in 2017. In 2016, and again in 2017, the band received the prize for most accessed heavy metal artist from Palco Mp3.

In 2018, Lyria released Immersion, their second album, which was supported by a crowdfunding campaign that raised more than $ 13,000. The song Hard to Believe was selected for the first music video from Immersion, being released together with the new album. In late 2018, Lyria released a music video for the track Let Me Be Me, recorded on the roof of a building in downtown Rio de Janeiro. The video is dedicated to the memory of Élan Botkin, fan and founder of the fan club Lyria Army, who had the song as his favorite.

In 2019, one of Lyria's most popular songs, The Rain also gets a music video, inspired by the story of an Australian fan, diagnosed on the autism spectrum, the song talks about overcoming and about love. The clip shows a series of "easter eggs" related to the disorder, as a way to draw attention to the cause.

Lyria's most recent release is the video Last Forever, released at the beginning of the Covid-19 pandemic, which reminds fans that the pain won’t last forever as a way to keep hope for a better future.

== Discography ==
- Catharsis (2014)
- Immersion (2018)

== Music videos ==
- Jester (2014)
- Revenge (2016)
- Hard to Believe (2018)
- Let Me Be Me (2018)
- The Rain (2019)
- Last Forever (2020)
- Run to You (2020)

== Members ==
=== Current members ===
- Aline Happ – lead vocals (2012–present)
- Thiago Zig – bass, backing vocals (2013–present)
- Rod Wolf – guitars (2015–present)
- Thiago Mateu – drums (2017–present)

=== Former members ===
- Eliezer Andre – drums (2013–2017)
