= The Lyre of Orpheus =

The Lyre of Orpheus may refer to:

- The lyre belonging to the legendary Greek figure Orpheus
- The Lyre of Orpheus (novel), a novel by Robertson Davies
- Abattoir Blues / The Lyre of Orpheus, an album by Nick Cave and the Bad Seeds, or the song "The Lyre of Orpheus"

== See also ==
- Lyra, a constellation associated, in Greek mythology, with the lyre of Orpheus
