= Lira, Salvaterra de Miño =

Lira
- Village
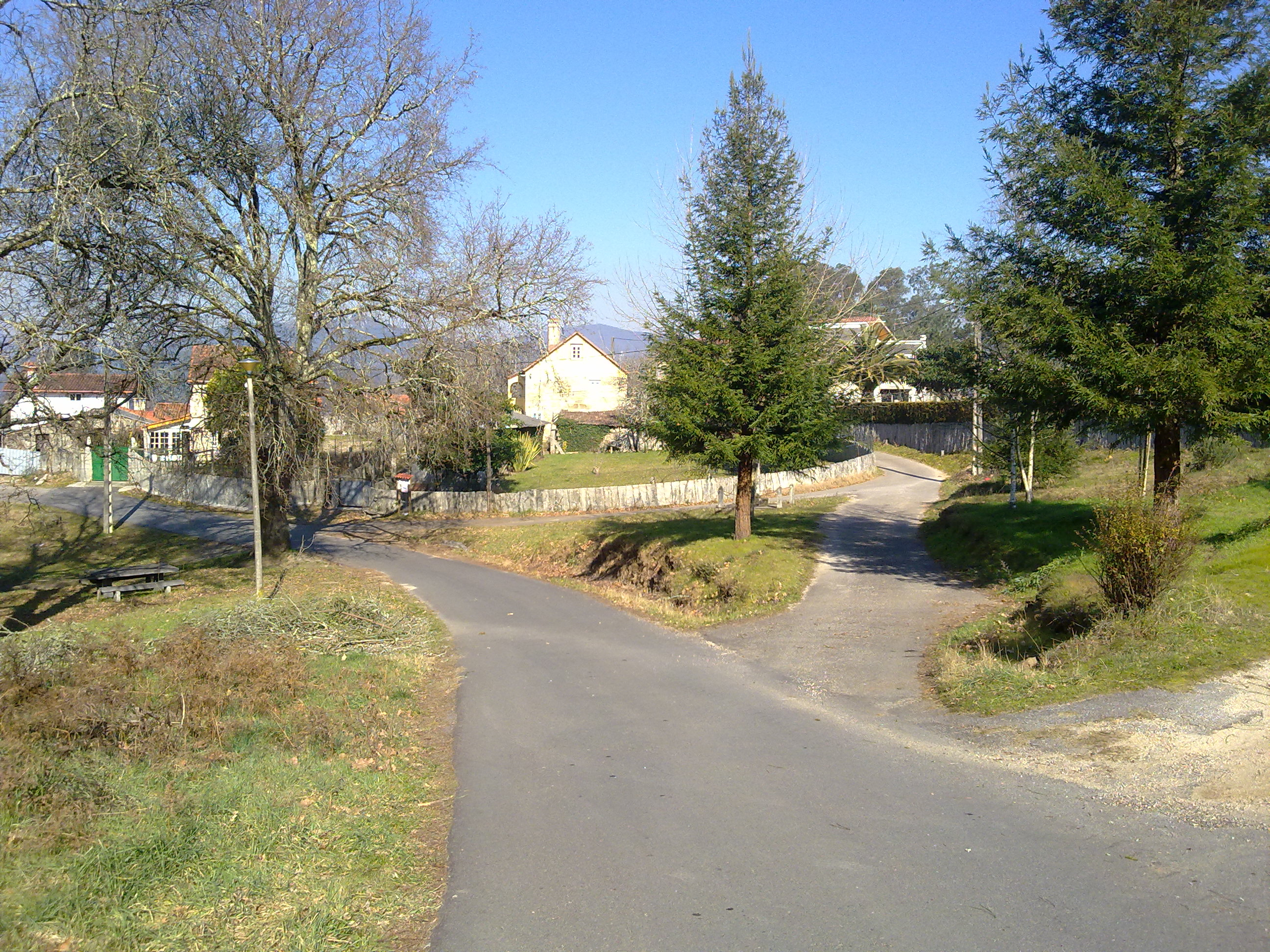
- Overview of As Cernadas neighborhood in winter time

- Location of Lira within Spain
- Coordinates: 42.153056°N 8.45999°W
- Country: Spain
- Region: Galicia
- Province: Pontevedra
- County: O Condado

Government
  - Type: Hamlet under the government of the municipality of Salvaterra de Miño (Mayor–council)

Area
  - Total: 4.330 km^{2} (1.672 sq mi)
- Elevation: 60 m (200 ft)

Population INE
  - Total: 307
  - Density: 70.9/km^{2} (184/sq mi)
- Demonym(s): lirense, liréns (m), lirense (f)
- Time zone: UTC+1 (CET)
  - Summer (DST): UTC+2 (CEST)
- Postcode: 36459
- Area code: +34 986

Lira is a village (aldea) belonging to the O Condado shire, in Galicia, north west of Spain. Legally is one of the parishes (parroquia) under the government of the council of Salvaterra de Miño. It had 307 inhabitants in 2004 divided into 15 small villages (lugares). The patron saint of the parish is Saint Simon.

It limits the north with the municipality of Ponteareas (Celeiros parish), the south the parishes of Soutolobre and Leirado, on the east by Vilacova and the western part the parish of Fornelos and the municipality of Ponteareas.

== Geography ==
=== Orography ===
The entire O Condado shire is a quite mountainous area. Lira has a hilly landscape, placed in the valley of Tea and Uma Rivers. The average altitude is low, about 60 m on the sea level.

=== Hydrography ===
The village has a lot of waterways due to high precipitation and the location in a valley. The largest and most important river is the Uma, with its small affluents, the Regueiro da Vila and the Rego da Lavandeira. The Uma River is a tributary of the Tea River, and this, in turn, the Minho.

=== Climate ===
The lands of Lira, with mild temperatures and rainfall usual throughout the year; are characterized by their Oceanic climate (Csf), with tendencies to have some summer drought, influence of the warm-summer Mediterranean climate (Csb). The annual mean temperature is approximately 15 °C (59.0 °F).

== Environment ==
Lira has preserved some of its Atlantic forests (fragas) where wildlife is commonly found, especially in the lower areas close to the rivers. It is relatively unpolluted, and its landscapes composed of green hills like Santo Amaro. Nevertheless, Lira is having some environmental problems in the modern age. Forest fires are a problem throughout the shire and in general in the whole Galicia. Besides some hills are spread of the eucalyptus tree, an invasive species imported from Australia, actively promoted and researched by the paper industry since the mid-twentieth century. Recently the Bursaphelenchus xylophilus, commonly known as pine wood nematode or pine wilt nematode is causing serious damages in pine populations. Furthermore, the construction conducted in recent years has transformed excessively habitats and landscape.

=== Biodiversity ===
Lira is a heavy forested area in Galicia, but the majority of Lira's plantations, usually growing eucalyptus or pine, lack any formal management, except a sound management of the forest local community. Wood figures significantly in Lira's economy. Apart from tree plantations, Lira is also notable for the surface occupied by vineyards, meadows and cornfields. A few Old-growth forests (known locally as fragas) remain, particularly in the lower parts dominated by the English oak (Quercus robur L.), mixed with other trees like: alders, birches, ashes, hazels, blackthorns, maples, willows, wild cherry trees, wild pear trees, etc. Hills are covered mainly by maritime pine trees (Pinus pinaster). As exotic species are blue gum (Eucalyptus globulus), black locust or false acacia (Robinia pseudacacia) and recently the invasive heaven tree (Ailanthus altissima). It is also frequent the American northern red oak (Quercus rubra) in new forest plantations. Shrubs (holly, hawthorn, blackberry, ivy, dog rose, elder, laurel bay, Scotch broom, gum rockrose or gorse) and herbaceous are also important. Lira also has a good range of heathers, ferns and mosses species.

=== Agriculture ===
Lira is a forest village but agriculture was also important. It can still seen some pastures, corn, potato, or cabbage fields, mainly for home consumption. Every house has its own garden and orchard: apples, pears, peaches, cherries, plums,... and recently kiwis or feijoas (pineapple guava). Special mention deserves the vines. Lira has always been the area of wine. Good quality wine (called Condado) belongs to the Rías Baixas (DO).
