= Lyra, Queensland =

Lyra
- Suburb
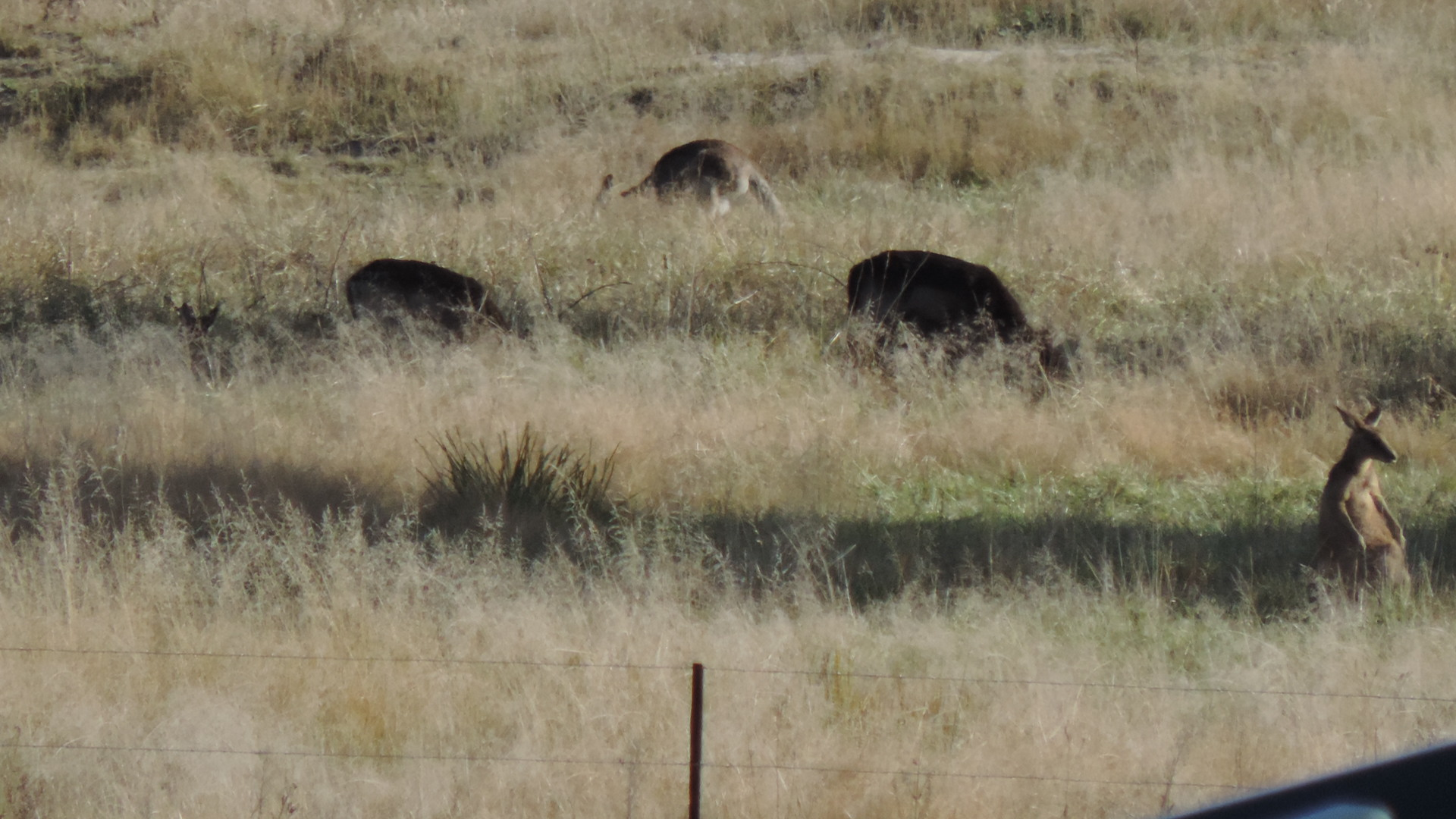
- Rural views (cows and wallabies), Lyra, 2015

- Interactive map of Lyra
- Coordinates: 28.8316°S 151.8650°E
- Country: Australia
- State: Queensland
- LGA: Southern Downs Region
- Location: 23.6 km (14.7 mi) SW of Stanthorpe; 85.1 km (52.9 mi) SSW of Warwick; 241 km (150 mi) SW of Brisbane

Government
  - State electorate: Southern Downs
  - Federal division: Maranoa

Area
  - Total: 12.8 km^{2} (4.9 sq mi)

Population
  - Total: 35 (2021 census)
  - Density: 2.73/km^{2} (7.08/sq mi)
- Time zone: UTC+10:00 (AEST)
- Postcode: 4382
Suburbs around Lyra
Ballandean	Ballandean	Ballandean
Ballandean	Lyra	Girraween
Ballandean	Wyberba	Wyberba

Lyra is a rural locality in the Southern Downs Region, Queensland, Australia. In the 2021 census, Lyra had a population of 35 people.

== Geography ==
The western and central part of the locality is relatively flat but the eastern part of the locality consists of foothills of the Great Dividing Range.

Accommodation Creek flows down from the range from the south-east (Wyberba) and exits to the north-west (Ballandean). Bald Rock Creek flows down from the range from the north-east (Ballandean) and becomes a tributary of Accommodation Creek at 28.8277°S 151.8627°E. Doctors Creek flows down from the range from the west (Girraween) and becomes a tributary of Bald Rock Creek at 28.8247°S 151.8802°E.

The New England Highway enters the locality from the north-west (Ballandean) and exits to the south (Wyberba). The Southern railway line runs parallel immediately to the east of the highway.

There are no protected areas within Lyra, but it borders Girraween National Park to the east.The land use is a mixture of horticulture and grazing on native vegetation. There are a number of vineyards in Lyra, including those of Sirromet Wines at 115 Anderson Road (28.8297°S 151.8685°E).

== History ==
The extension of the Southern railway line from Stanthorpe to Wallangarra was completed on 14 February 1887 with the district being served by Lyra railway station (28.8297°S 151.8550°E), which was named by the Queensland Railway Department after the constellation Lyra. The locality takes its name from the railway station.

The Sacred Heart Catholic Church opened in 1908.

Lyra State School opened on 7 November 1929 with an enrolment of 10 students under head teacher Kathleen May O'Donohue. The school site was donated by Evan Hindmarsh. The school building was relocated from the former Applevale State School while the school furniture came from the former Somme State School. The school closed on 19 June 1966, with the students being transferred to Ballandean State School. The school was on the western side of the New England Highway, opposite the railway station (approx 28.82985°S 151.85429°E).

== Demographics ==
In the 2016 census, Lyra had a population of 53 people.

In the 2021 census, Lyra had a population of 35 people.

== Education ==
There are no schools in Lyra. The nearest government primary school is Ballandean State School in neighbouring Ballandean to the north-west. The nearest government secondary school is Stanthorpe State High School in Stanthorpe to the north. There is a Catholic primary-and-secondary school in Stanthorpe.

== Amenities ==
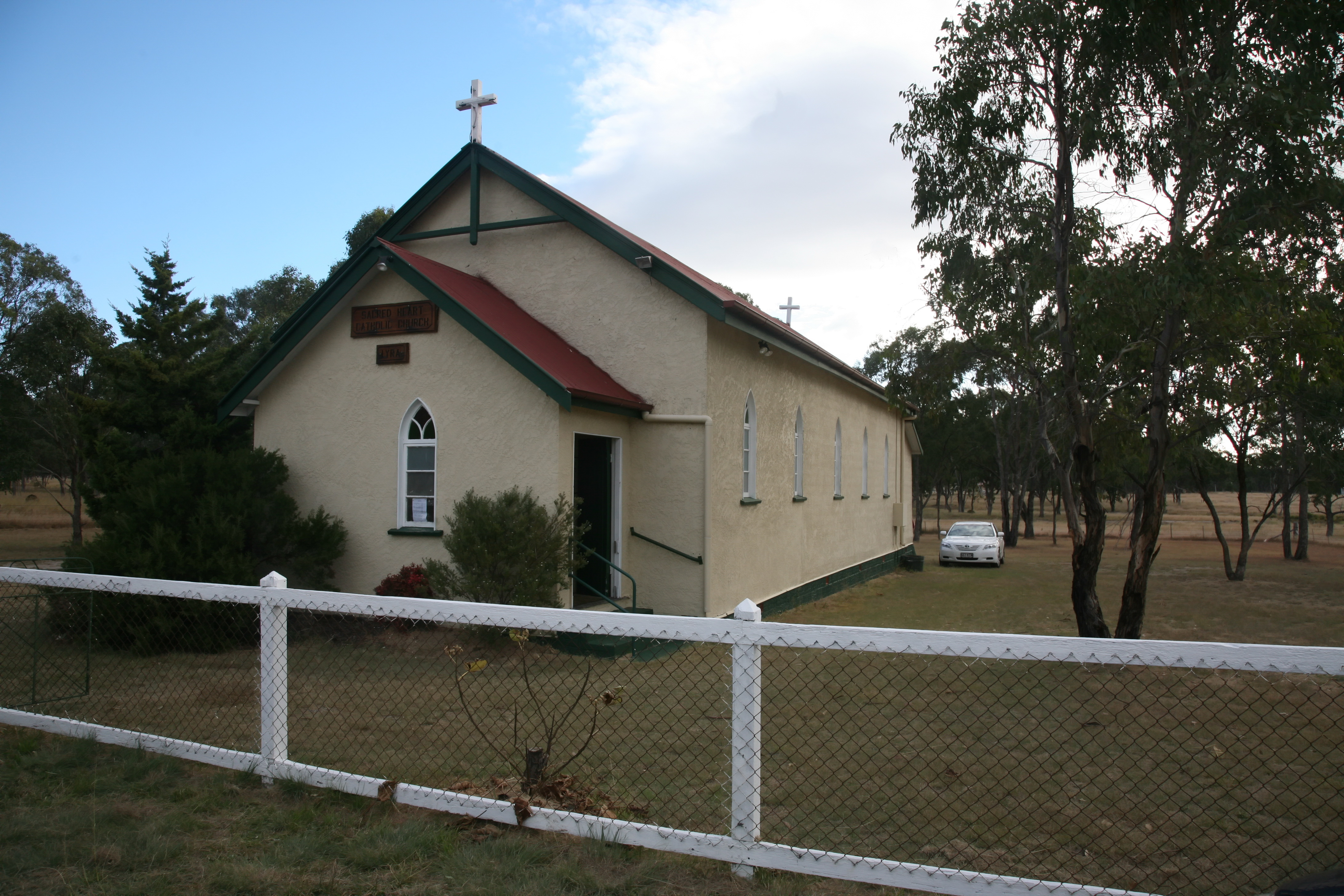
Sacred Heart Catholic Church, Lyra, 2008

The Sacred Heart Catholic Church is at 28608 New England Highway (28.83054°S 151.85442°E). It is part of the Roman Catholic Diocese of Toowoomba.
