= Jennings, New South Wales =

Jennings New South Wales
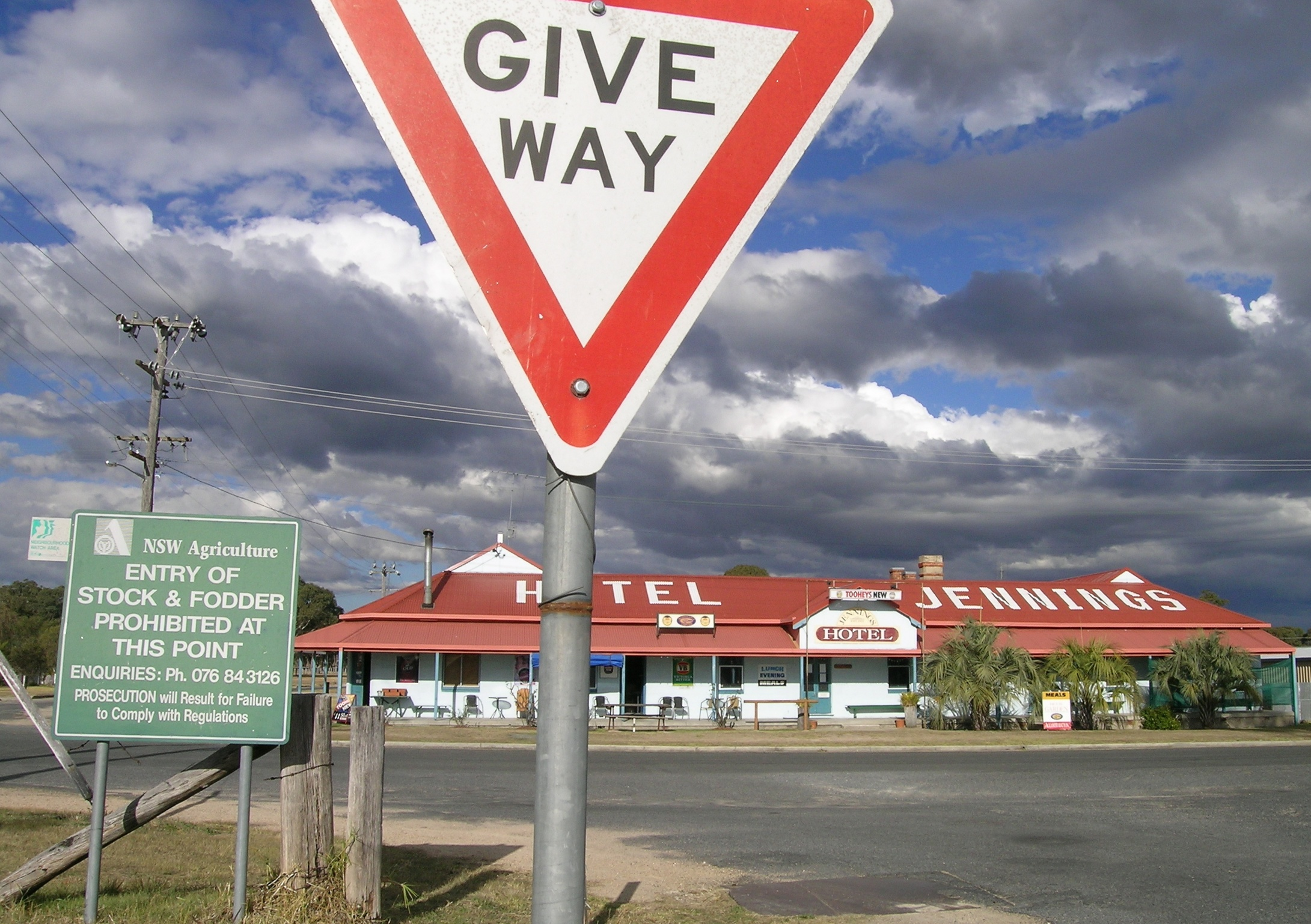
- Hotel and NSW Agriculture warning

- Coordinates: 28°56′32″S 151°57′36″E
- Population: 211 (2011 census)
- Established: 1888
- Postcode(s): 4383
- Elevation: 875 m (2,871 ft)
- Location: 718 km (446 mi) N of Sydney; 256 km (159 mi) SW of Brisbane; 99 km (62 mi) S of Warwick (QLD); 19 km (12 mi) NW of Tenterfield; 2 km (1 mi) S of Wallangarra (QLD)
- LGA(s): Tenterfield Shire
- State electorate(s): Lismore
- Federal division(s): New England
Mean max temp	Mean min temp	Annual rainfall
20.8 °C; 69 °F	8.6 °C; 47 °F	773.7 mm 30.5 in

Jennings is a town on the Northern Tablelands region of New South Wales, Australia. The town is located in the Tenterfield Shire local government area, 718 kilometres (446 mi) from the state capital, Sydney and 256 kilometres (159 mi) from Brisbane. It is separated by the state border from its neighbouring town of Wallangarra in Queensland. At the 2011 census, Jennings had a population of 211. The New England Highway and the Main North railway line cross the state border at Jennings. The town was named for Sir Patrick Jennings, the first Roman Catholic Premier of New South Wales.

== History ==
The rail line from Brisbane reached Wallangarra in 1887, a year before the Main North railway line reached Jennings from Sydney in 1888. A break-of-gauge station was established on the border with the north platform part of the Queensland rail network and the southern platform maintained by New South Wales. After several changes of name between the two towns, in 1904, the name of the station was confirmed as Wallangarra. A Jennings Railway Station Telegraph Office opened on 16 January 1888. In 1904 it was renamed by a Wallangarra Receiving Office. The Wallangarra Post Office in Queensland was opened in 1885. Passenger rail services to Brisbane ceased in 1972 and the New South Wales line was closed north of Tenterfield to rail traffic in 1989. The station, refurbished in 2001, is now listed on the Queensland Heritage Register.

The Jennings Public School, still in operation and sited virtually opposite the Wallangarra School in Queensland, was established in 1889 following representations from the Officer in Charge of Customs for New South Wales at Wallangarra. During World War II, an ammunition dump was established at Jennings due to the break-of-gauge at Wallangarra railway station. The dump along with a general army store in Wallangarra still exist today.

A modern survey of the Queensland/New South Wales border, conducted as a Centenary of Federation project in 2001, found an error of 200 metres (700 ft) in the original border survey, conducted between 1863 and 1866, near Jennings. This indicates that if the border was placed where originally intended, Jennings would be located in Queensland rather than New South Wales.
