= Wyberba, Queensland =

Wyberba
- Suburb
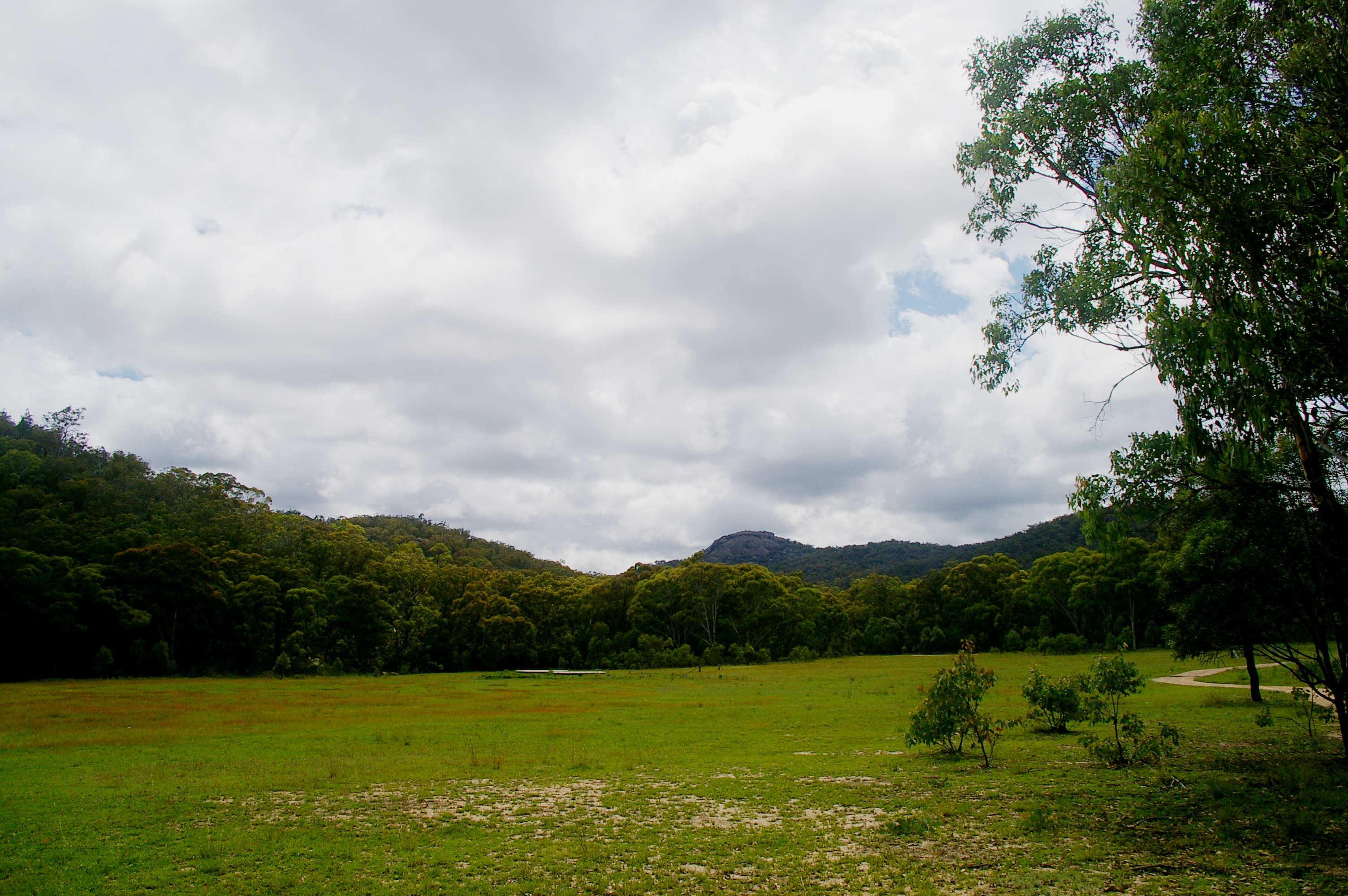
- Granite outcrop at Girraween Environmental Lodge, 2007

- Interactive map of Wyberba
- Coordinates: 28.8616°S 151.8819°E
- Country: Australia
- State: Queensland
- LGA: Southern Downs Region
- Location: 11.7 km (7.3 mi) NNW of Wallangarra; 29.1 km (18.1 mi) SSW of Stanthorpe; 90.3 km (56.1 mi) SSW of Warwick; 173 km (107 mi) S of Toowoomba; 249 km (155 mi) SW of Brisbane

Government
  - State electorate: Southern Downs
  - Federal division: Maranoa

Area
  - Total: 21.6 km^{2} (8.3 sq mi)

Population
  - Total: 63 (2021 census)
  - Density: 2.917/km^{2} (7.55/sq mi)
- Time zone: UTC+10:00 (AEST)
- Postcode: 4382
Suburbs around Wyberba
Lyra	Girraween	Girraween
Ballandean	Wyberba	Girraween
Ballandean	Wallangarra	Wallangarra

Wyberba is a rural locality in the Southern Downs Region, Queensland, Australia. In the 2021 census, Wyberba had a population of 63 people.

== Geography ==
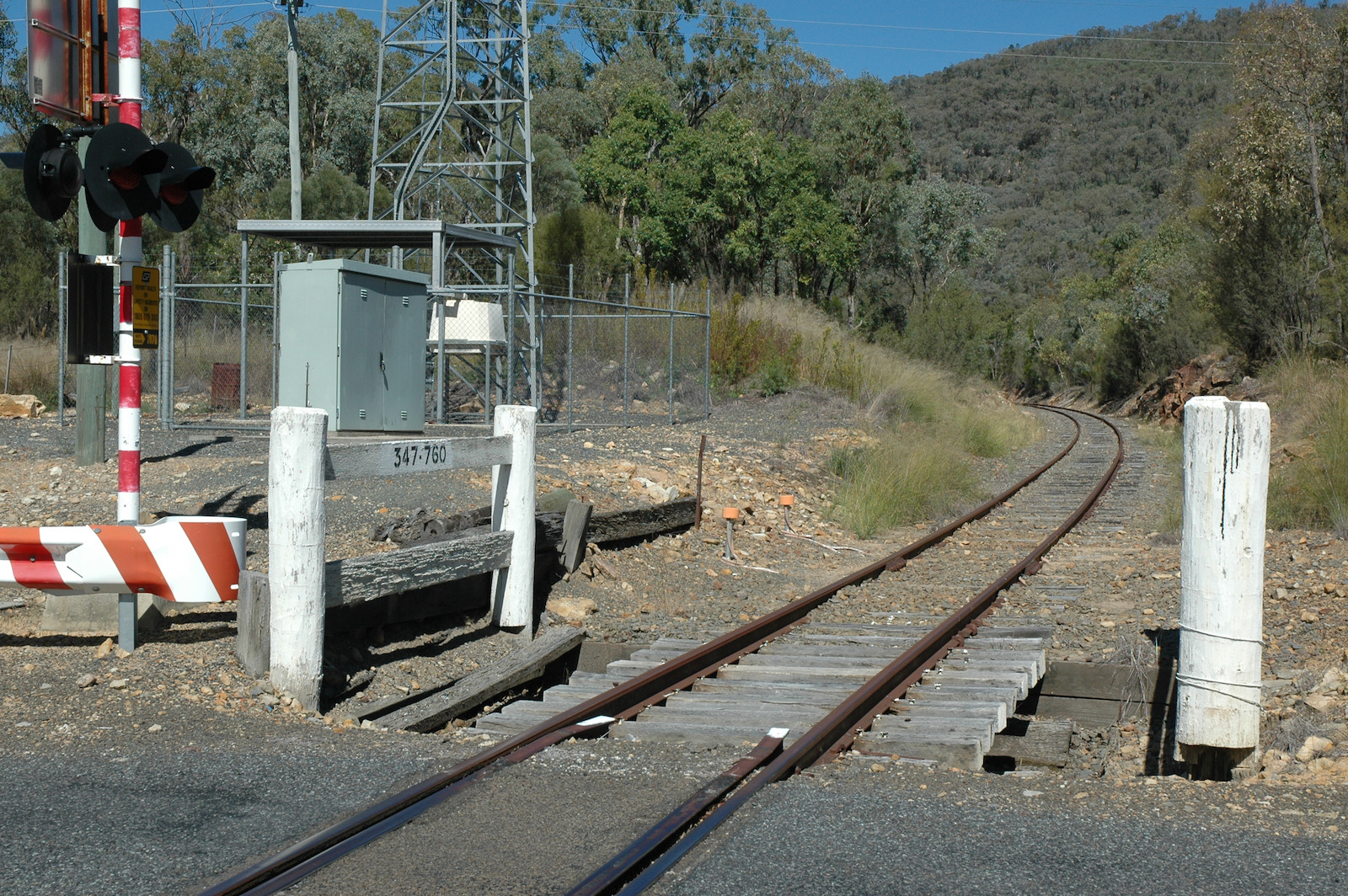
Site of the Wyberba railway station, 2009

The New England Highway enters the locality from the north-west (Lyra) and forms the south-western boundary of the locality before exiting to the south (Wallangarra). The Southern railway line enters the locality from Lyra, immediately east of the highway, but takes a more easterly route through the north of the locality than the highway does, but rejoins the highway along the south-western boundary of the locality before exiting to the south (Wallangarra). Wyberba railway station is a now-abandoned railway station on the line at Pyramid Road (28.8598°S 151.8674°E).

The land use is predominantly grazing on native vegetation with some crop growing.

== History ==
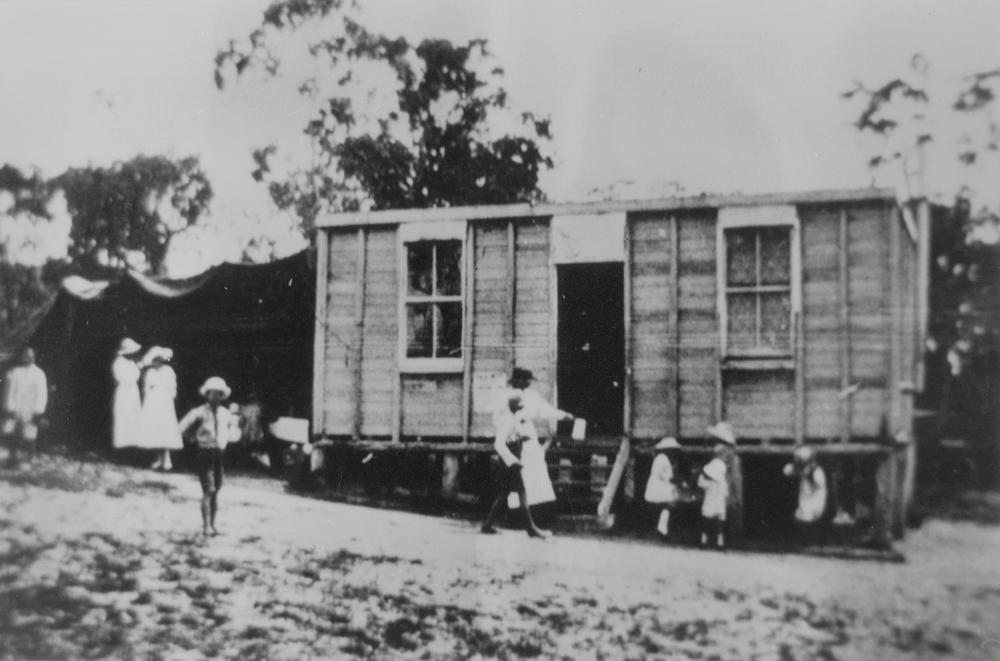
Wyberba School, 1919

Wyberba Provisional School opened on 7 November 1918. In July 1921, it became Wyberba State School. It closed on 10 December 1976. It was at 2394 Pyramids Road (28.85610°S 151.87723°E).

== Demographics ==
In the 2016 census, Wyberba had a population of 71 people.

In the 2021 census, Wyberba had a population of 63 people.

== Education ==
There are no schools in Wyberba. The nearest government primary schools are Ballandean State School in Ballandean to the north and Wallangarra State School in neighbouring Wallangarra to the south. The nearest government secondary school is Stanthorpe State High School in Stanthorpe to the north.

== Attractions ==
Visitor attractions in Wyberba include:

- the Pyramid Wines vineyard and winery
- Balancing Heart vineyard and cellar door
