= Sergio A. Lira =

Brazilian-American immunologist

Sérgio A. Lira
- Education: Universidade Federal de Pernambuco, Brazil; University of California, San Diego
- Scientific career
- Fields: Immunology
- Workplaces: Mount Sinai Medical Center

Sérgio A. Lira, is a Brazilian-born American immunologist who pioneered the use of genetic approaches to study the function of chemokines. His early studies were the first to show that chemokines played a major role on leukocyte trafficking to the brain, the lung and the thymus.

Lira is currently the Leona M. and Harry B. Helmsley Charitable Trust Professor of Immunology at the Mount Sinai School of Medicine and previous co-director/director of the Immunology Institute at the Mount Sinai Medical Center (2007-2013 as co-director and 2013-2016 director), both in New York City. He is the author of more than 120 published articles.

== Biography ==
Lira earned an M.D. from Universidade Federal de Pernambuco, in Recife, Brazil, in 1982 and a Ph.D. in physiology and pharmacology from the University of California, San Diego, in 1988. He completed a postdoctoral fellowship at the Department of Cell and Development Biology at the Roche Institute of Molecular Biology, New Jersey, in 1992. From 1992-1996, he was at Bristol-Myers-Squibb Pharmaceutical Research Institute as Head of the Transgenic Unit. He served as Director, Department of Immunology, at the Schering-Plough Research Institute between 1996-2002. He joined the Mount Sinai Medical Center in 2002 as the Irene Diamond Associate Professor of Immunology.

Lira organized the 2003 Keystone Symposium on Chemokines and the 2006 Gordon Research Conference on Chemotactic Cytokines. He was elected to the Henry Kunkel Society in 2006 and to the Association of American Physicians in 2008. He received the Inventor’s Award (in 2000) and the Impact Award (in 1998) from the Schering-Plough Research Institute.

== Areas of research ==
Lira’s lab pioneered the use of genetic approaches to study the function of chemokines during homeostasis and disease conditions. Other contributions include studies on the mechanisms of lymphoid neogenesis and on the biological function of molecules encoded by viruses that mimic chemokines, including the discovery that the chemokine receptor encoded by herpesvirus 8 is an oncogene, a discovery that led to important insights into the mechanisms leading to the development of Kaposi’s sarcoma. Lira’s lab has also made important contributions to the study of IL-23, a cytokine that affects development of inflammatory and autoimmune conditions.

== Honors and awards ==
- Max Planck Gesellschaft (Germany) - Student Fellowship. February 1980 - June 1980.
- International Endocrine Society - Travel Award. International Congress of Endocrinology, Kyoto, Japan. 1988.
- President's Award - Bristol-Myers Squibb Company. 1995
- Impact Award - Schering-Plough Research Institute. 1998
- Inventor’s Award - Schering-Plough Research Institute. 2000
- Irene Diamond Associate Professorship in Immunology Award – July 2002.
- Elected to the Henry Kunkel Society – May 2006
- Elected to the Association of American Physicians – April 2008

== Publications ==
Partial list:

- Bongers, G; Maussang, D; Muniz, LR; Noriega, VM; Fraile-Ramos, A; Barker, N; Marchesi, F; Thirunarayanan, N; Vischer, HF; et al. (2010). "The cytomegalovirus-encoded chemokine receptor US28 promotes intestinal neoplasia in transgenic mice". J Clin Invest. 120 (11): 3969–3978. doi:10.1172/jci42563. PMC 2964974. PMID 20978345.
- Furtado, GC; Marinkovic, T; Martin, AP; Garin, A; Hoch, B; Hubner, W; Chen, BK; Genden, E; Skobe, M; et al. (2007). "Lymphotoxin beta receptor signaling is required for inflammatory lymphangiogenesis in the thyroid". Proc Natl Acad Sci USA. 104 (12): 5026–5031. Bibcode:2007PNAS..104.5026F. doi:10.1073/pnas.0606697104. PMC 1829258. PMID 17360402.
- Marinkovic, T; Garin, A; Yokota, Y; Fu Y-X, Ruddle NH; Furtado, GC; Lira, SA. (2006). "Interaction of mature CD3+CD4+ T cells with dendritic cells triggers the development of tertiary lymphoid structures in the thyroid". J Clin Invest. 116 (10): 2622–2632. doi:10.1172/jci28993. PMC 1570377. PMID 16998590.
- Grisotto, MG; Garin, A; Martin, AP; Jensen, KK; Chan, P; Sealfon, SC; Lira, SA. (2006). "The human herpesvirus 8 chemokine receptor vGPCR triggers autonomous proliferation of endothelial cells". J Clin Invest. 116 (5): 1264–1273. doi:10.1172/jci26666. PMC 1430356. PMID 16604194.
- Jamieson, T; Cook, DN; Nibbs, RJB; Rot, A; Nixon, C; McLean, P; Alcami, A; Lira, SA; Wiekowski, M; et al. (2005). "The chemokine receptor D6 limits the inflammatory response in vivo". Nat Immunol. 6 (4): 403–411. doi:10.1038/ni1182. PMID 15750596. S2CID 33588361.
- Cua, DJ; Sherlock, J; Chen, Y; Murphy, CA; Joyce, B; Seymour, B; Lucian, L; To, W; Kwan, S; et al. (2003). "Interleukin-23 rather than interleukin-12 is the critical cytokine for autoimmune inflammation of the brain". Nature. 421 (6924): 744–748. Bibcode:2003Natur.421..744C. doi:10.1038/nature01355. PMID 12610626. S2CID 4380302.
- Chen S-C, Vassileva G; Kinsley, D; Holzmann, S; Manfra, D; Wiekowski, MT; Romani, N; Lira, SA.; Lira, S. A. (2002). "Ectopic expression of the murine chemokines CCL21a and CCL21b induces the formation of lymph node-like structures in pancreas, but not skin, of transgenic mice". J Immunol. 168 (3): 1001–1008. doi:10.4049/jimmunol.168.3.1001. PMID 11801632.
- Wiekowski, MT; Leach, MW; Evans, EW; Sullivan, L; Chen, SC; Vassileva, G; Bazan, JF; Gorman, DM; Kastelein, RA; et al. (2001). "Ubiquitous transgenic expression of the IL-23 subunit p19 induces multiorgan inflammation, runting, infertility, and premature death". J Immunol. 166 (12): 7563–7570. doi:10.4049/jimmunol.166.12.7563. PMID 11390512.
- Marchesi F, Martin AP, Thirunarayanan N, Devany E, Mayer L, Grisotto MG, Furtado GC, Lira SA (November 2009). "CXCL13 expression in the gut promotes accumulation of IL-22-producing lymphoid tissue-inducer cells, and formation of isolated lymphoid follicles". Mucosal Immunol. 2 (6): 486–94. doi:10.1038/mi.2009.113. PMID 19741597.
- Holst, PJ; Rosenkilde, MM; Manfra, D; Chen, SC; Wiekowski, MT; Holst, B; Cifire, F; Lipp, M; Schwartz, TW; et al. (2001). "Tumorigenesis induced by the HHV8-encoded chemokine receptor requires ligand modulation of high constitutive activity". J Clin Invest. 108 (12): 1789–1796. doi:10.1172/JCI13622. PMC 209468. PMID 11748262.
- Cook, DN; Chen, SC; Sullivan, LM; Manfra, DJ; Wiekowski, MT; Prosser, DM; Vassileva, G; Lira, SA. (2001). "Generation and analysis of mice lacking the chemokine fractalkine". Mol Cell Biol. 21 (9): 3159–3165. doi:10.1128/mcb.21.9.3159-3165.2001. PMC 86945. PMID 11287620.
- Chensue, SW; Lukacs, NW; Yang, TY; Shang, X; Frait, KA; Kunkel, SL; Kung, T; Wiekowski, MT; Hedrick, JA; et al. (2001). "Aberrant in vivo T helper type 2 cell response and impaired eosinophil recruitment in CC chemokine receptor 8 knockout mice". J Exp Med. 193 (5): 573–584. doi:10.1084/jem.193.5.573. PMC 2193397. PMID 11238588.
- Yang, TY; Chen, SC; Leach, MW; Manfra, D; Homey, B; Wiekowski, M; Sullivan, L; Jenh, CH; Narula, SK; et al. (2000). "Transgenic expression of the chemokine receptor encoded by human herpesvirus 8 induces an angioproliferative disease resembling Kaposi's sarcoma". J Exp Med. 191 (3): 445–454. doi:10.1084/jem.191.3.445. PMC 2195818. PMID 10662790.
- Cook, DN; Prosser, DM; Forster, R; Zhang, J; Kuklin, NA; Abbondanzo, SJ; Niu, XD; Chen, SC; Manfra, DJ; et al. (2000). "CCR6 mediates dendritic cell localization, lymphocyte homeostasis, and immune responses in mucosal tissue". Immunity. 12 (5): 495–503. doi:10.1016/s1074-7613(00)80201-0. PMID 10843382.
- Vassileva, G; Soto, H; Zlotnik, A; Nakano, H; Kakiuchi, T; Hedrick, JA; Lira, SA. (1999). "The reduced expression of 6Ckine in the plt mouse results from the deletion of one of two 6Ckine genes". J Exp Med. 190 (8): 1183–1188. doi:10.1084/jem.190.8.1183. PMC 2195659. PMID 10523616.
- Tani, M; Fuentes, ME; Peterson, JW; Trapp, BD; Durham, SK; Loy, JK; Bravo, R; Ransohoff, RM; Lira, SA.; et al. (1996). "Neutrophil infiltration, glial reaction, and neurological disease in transgenic mice expressing the chemokine N51/KC in oligodendrocytes". J Clin Invest. 98 (2): 529–539. doi:10.1172/jci118821. PMC 507459. PMID 8755666.
- Weih, F; Carrasco, D; Durham, SK; Barton, DS; Rizzo, CA; Ryseck, RP; Lira, SA; Bravo, R. (1995). "Multiorgan inflammation and hematopoietic abnormalities in mice with a targeted disruption of RelB, a member of the NF-kappa B/Rel family". Cell. 80 (2): 331–340. doi:10.1016/0092-8674(95)90416-6. PMID 7834753. S2CID 14742479.
- Fuentes, ME; Durham, SK; Swerdel, MR; Lewin, AC; Barton, DS; Megill, JR; Bravo, R; Lira, SA. (1995). "Controlled recruitment of monocytes and macrophages to specific organs through transgenic expression of monocyte chemoattractant protein-1". J Immunol. 155 (12): 5769–5776. doi:10.4049/jimmunol.155.12.5769. PMID 7499865.
- Smeyne, RJ; Klein, R; Schnapp, A; Long, LK; Bryant, S; Lewin, A; Lira, SA; Barbacid, M. (1994). "Severe sensory and sympathetic neuropathies in mice carrying a disrupted Trk/NGF receptor gene". Nature. 368 (6468): 246–249. Bibcode:1994Natur.368..246S. doi:10.1038/368246a0. PMID 8145823. S2CID 4318721.
- Lira, SA; Zalamea, P; Heinrich, JN; Fuentes, ME; Carrasco, D; Lewin, AC; Barton, DS; Durham, S; Bravo, R.; et al. (1994). "Expression of the chemokine N51/KC in the thymus and epidermis of transgenic mice results in marked infiltration of a single class of inflammatory cells". J Exp Med. 180 (6): 2039–2048. doi:10.1084/jem.180.6.2039. PMC 2191760. PMID 7964481.
- Lira, SA; Crenshaw, EB; Glass, CK; Swanson, LW; Rosenfeld, MG. (1988). "Identification of rat growth hormone genomic sequences targeting pituitary expression in transgenic mice". Proc Natl Acad Sci USA. 85 (13): 4755–4759. Bibcode:1988PNAS...85.4755L. doi:10.1073/pnas.85.13.4755. PMC 280514. PMID 3387436.
- Nelson, C; Crenshaw, EB; Franco, R; Lira, SA; Albert, VR; Evans, RM; Rosenfeld, MG. (1986). "Discrete cis-active genomic sequences dictate the pituitary cell type-specific expression of rat prolactin and growth hormone genes". Nature. 322 (6079): 557–562. Bibcode:1986Natur.322..557N. doi:10.1038/322557a0. PMID 3736673. S2CID 4324841.
