= Wallangarra, Queensland =

Wallangarra
- Town
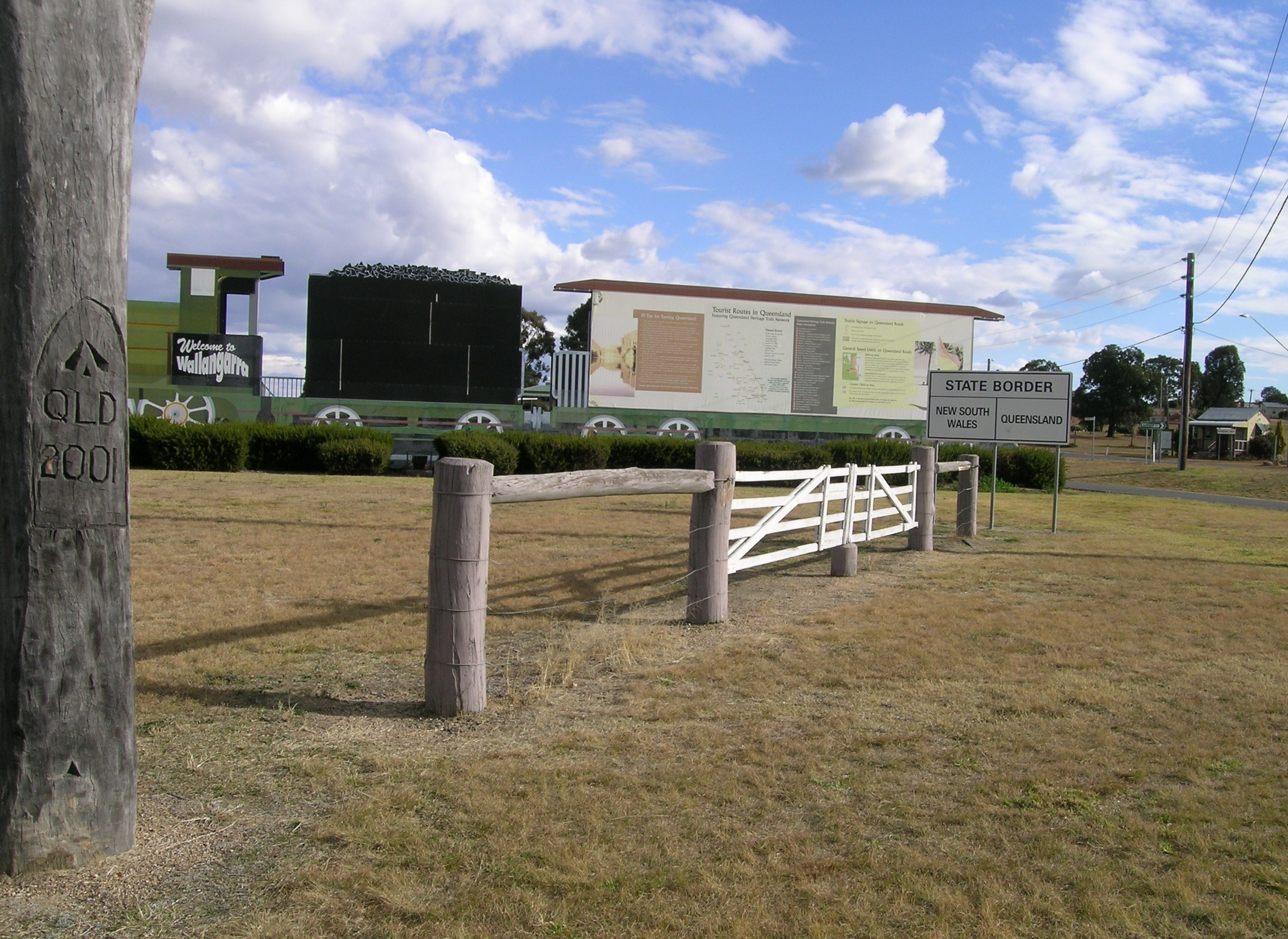
- Border "gates" at Wallangarra

- Interactive map of Wallangarra
- Coordinates: 28.9194°S 151.9325°E
- Country: Australia
- State: Queensland
- LGA: Southern Downs Region
- Location: 20.0 km (12.4 mi) NNW of Tenterfield (NSW); 36.7 km (22.8 mi) S of Stanthorpe; 97.9 km (60.8 mi) S of Warwick; 258 km (160 mi) SW of Brisbane
- Established: 1885

Government
  - State electorate: Southern Downs
  - Federal division: Maranoa

Area
  - Total: 36.9 km^{2} (14.2 sq mi)
- Elevation: 878 m (2,881 ft)

Population
  - Total: 440 (2021 census)
  - Density: 11.92/km^{2} (30.9/sq mi)
- Time zone: UTC+10:00 (AEST)
- Postcode: 4383
- County: Bentinck
- Parish: Tenterfield
- Mean max temp: 20.8 °C (69.4 °F)
- Mean min temp: 8.6 °C (47.5 °F)
- Annual rainfall: 781.0 mm (30.75 in)
Localities around Wallangarra
Ballandean	Wyberba	Girraween
Ballandean	Wallangarra	Jennings (NSW)
Ballandean	Tarban (NSW)	Jennings (NSW)

Wallangarra is a rural town and locality in the Southern Downs Region, Queensland, Australia. It is on the border with New South Wales. It is the third-most southerly town in Queensland, 258 kilometres (160 mi) south west of Brisbane. Wallangarra is on the Queensland side of the border and Jennings is on the New South Wales side. In the 2021 census, the locality of Wallangarra had a population of 440.

== History ==
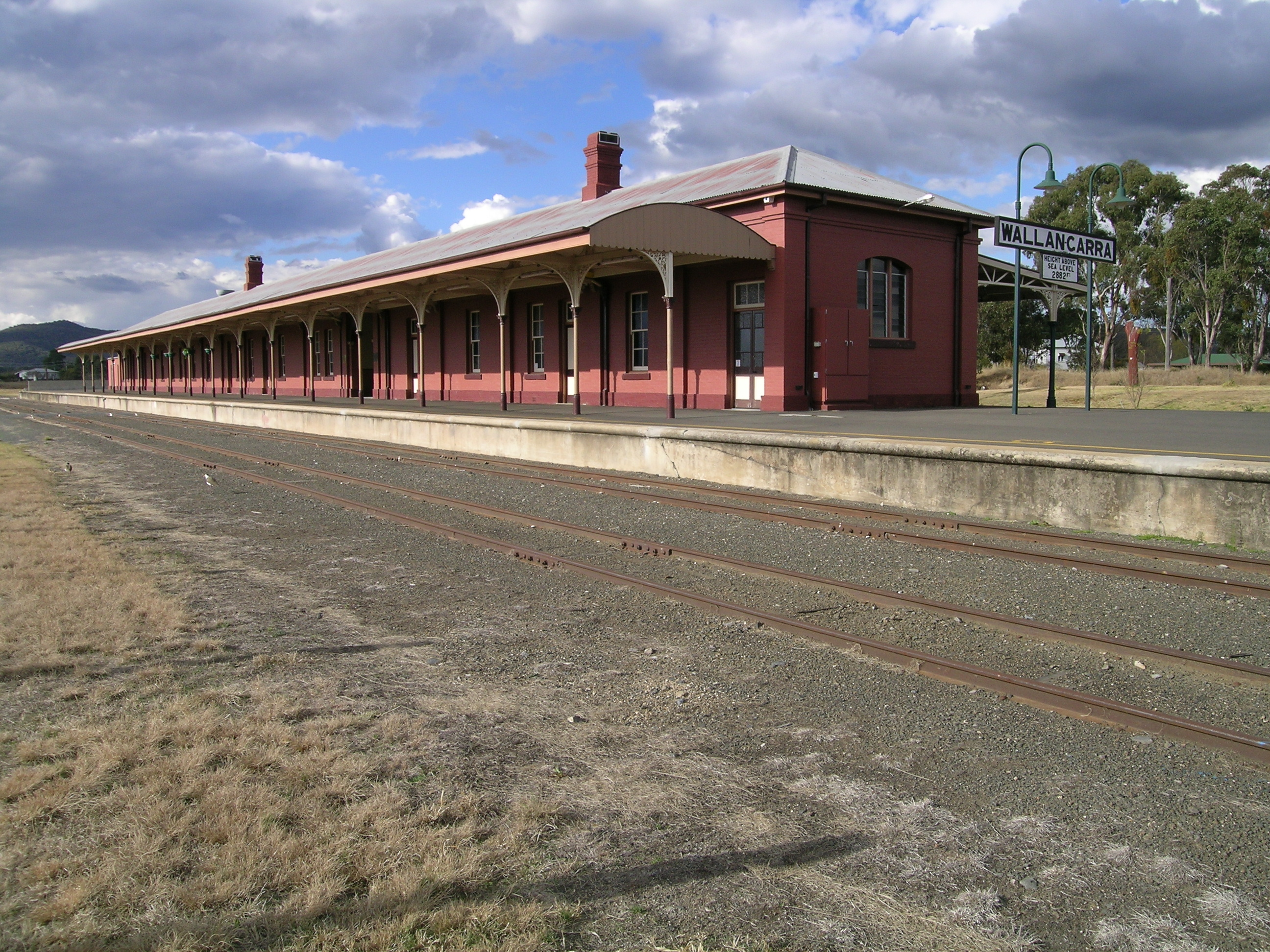
Wallangarra station with different style of awnings and the Queensland side compared to the New South Wales side

In 1885, the Queensland Government announced that a town would be formed where the railway line between Queensland and New South Wales would meet. On 29 June 1885, 179 lots were offered for sale at £8 per acre (£20/ha). The town would provide a break-of-gauge between Queensland's narrow gauge Southern railway line of 3 ft 6 in (1,067 mm) and New South Wales's standard gauge Main North railway line of 4 ft 8 1/2 in (1,435 mm) when the two systems came together in 1888. Two railway stations were created within the area. One was named Wallan-garra railway station (28.9231°S 151.9319°E) and the town took its name from the station but used the spelling Wallangarra (with most people using the same spelling for the railway station). Bald Mountain railway station (28.8966°S 151.9143°E) was the other railway station and is now abandoned.

Wallangarra Provisional School opened on 13 February 1888. On 1 January 1909, it became Wallangarra State School.

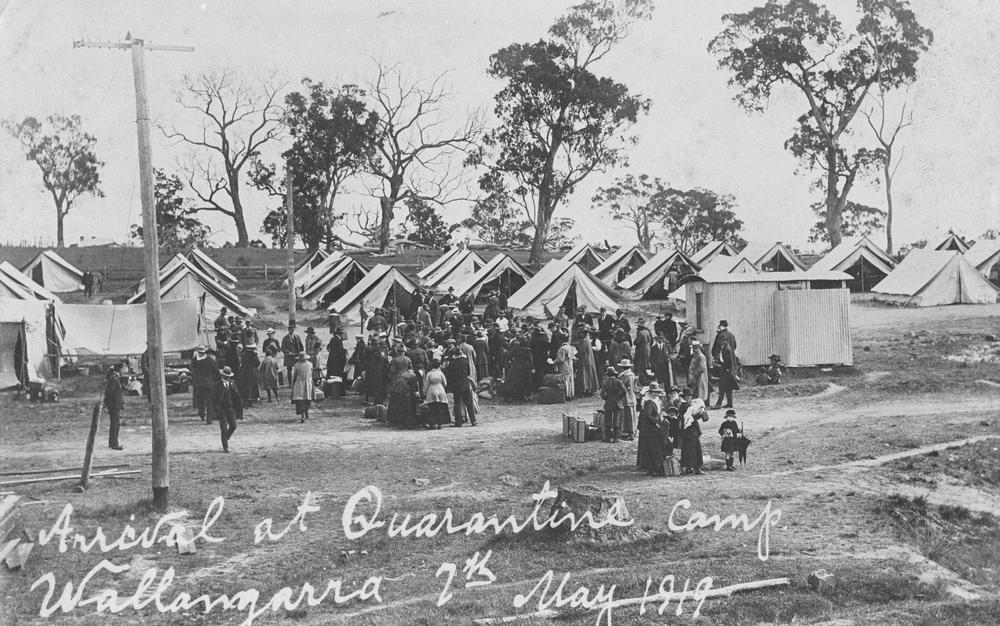
Influenza quarantine camp, Wallangarra, 1919

On 28 January 1919, the Queensland Government placed restrictions on the border crossing at Wallangarra to prevent the spread of the Spanish flu into Queensland, which were enforced by the Queensland Police. A medical screening process was used to determine if Queensland residents could safely return to the state.

The railway was the only rail link between Queensland and New South Wales until a standard gauge track was completed via Kyogle in 1930, with the completion of the bridge over the Clarence River at Grafton. From that time on, the Wallangarra railway station lessened in importance. Scheduled rail services ended in 1997. In 2003, after major refurbishment, the station was reopened as a museum. The railway line from Stanthorpe to Wallangarra continued to be maintained, and steam tourist trains occasionally operated to Wallangarra until bushfires in late 2023 destroyed wooden bridge links along the route. As of January 2026, the steam trains terminate at Ballandean.

The Anderson Meat Packing Company was restarted by Mr. A.W. Anderson in 1938 after a 15-month closure. Until 1982, it operated a large beef abattoir at Wallangarra. Anderson's employed in excess of 400 workers at the Wallangarra plant.

During World War II, the Australian Government created a general army store on the Queensland side of the border, and an ammunition dump on the New South Wales side. Dual gauge tracks were run to each store.

Wallangarra Cemetery was established in 1953.

On 12 September 1964, St Gabrielle's Anglican Church was dedicated by Bishop John Hudson. Its closure circa 2013 was approved by Bishop Robert Nolan. The church building was sold into private ownership for $210,000 in October 2014, but remains at 54 Merinda Street (28.9219°S 151.9308°E).

Taking advantage of the rail junction Riverina Stock Feeds operated a packing plant at Wallangarra railway.

Circa 2005, Thomas Foods International opened Australia's largest mutton works opened on a new site just to the east of the town. The mutton produced is Halal, and most of it is exported to Arab countries. The abattoir shut down in July 2016 for "the short to medium term" blaming low stock numbers and poor global trading conditions.

== Geography ==
Wallangarra lies in a valley between two ranges of mountains, which are branches of the Great Dividing Range. It is 878 m (2,881 ft) above sea level. There is a gap between the more Westerly range at Wyberba, about five kilometres north of Wallangarra. This gap has made Wallangarra the major inland border crossing for the New England Highway and what was the first railway line between Brisbane and Sydney. It is situated on the northern periphery of the New England Peppermint Grassy Woodland.

== Climate ==
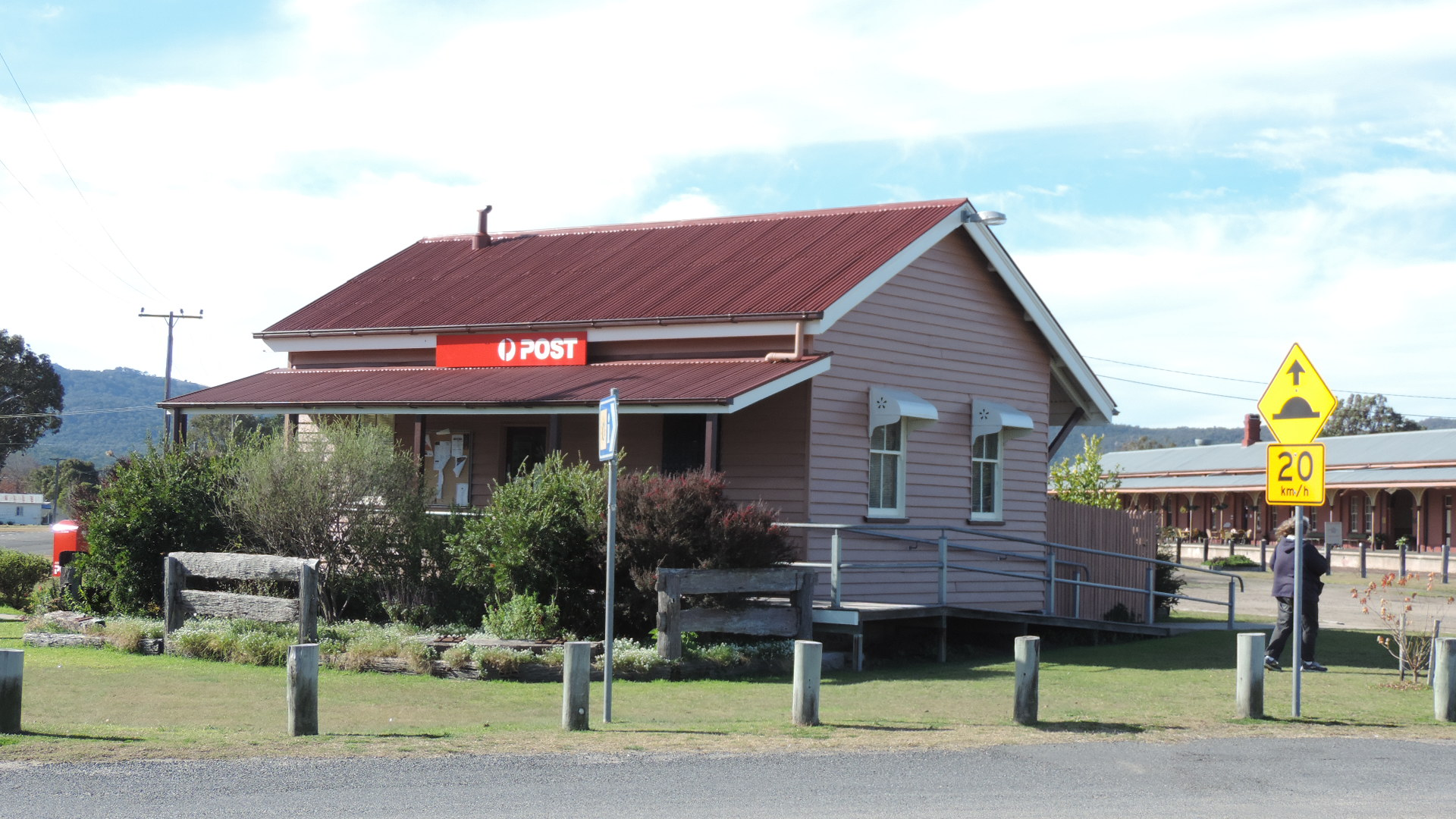
Climate data is recorded at the Wallangarra Post Office

Wallangarra is the coldest town by mean maximum temperature in Queensland, due to its altitude and extreme southern location in the state. Maximum temperatures average 13.9 °C (57 °F) in winter and 26.6 °C (80 °F) in summer. Wallangarra holds the record for the lowest maximum temperature in Queensland, 2.4 °C (36 °F) on 3 July 1984. However due to its exposed location, minimum temperatures are not particularly low; towns of significantly lower altitude such as Warwick and Oakey frequently record lower minima, and especially Stanthorpe of similar altitude but much flatter topography − which in turn causes warmer daytime temperatures and less snowfall compared to Wallangarra.

Climate data for Wallangarra Post Office (1938–1992, rainfall 1888–2024); 875 m AMSL; 28.92° S, 151.93° E
Month	Jan	Feb	Mar	Apr	May	Jun	Jul	Aug	Sep	Oct	Nov	Dec	Year
Record high °C (°F)	36.2 (97.2)	34.3 (93.7)	31.7 (89.1)	34.5 (94.1)	24.5 (76.1)	20.7 (69.3)	20.4 (68.7)	25.9 (78.6)	28.1 (82.6)	32.6 (90.7)	35.0 (95.0)	36.0 (96.8)	36.2 (97.2)
Mean daily maximum °C (°F)	26.6 (79.9)	25.4 (77.7)	24.1 (75.4)	21.1 (70.0)	17.5 (63.5)	14.5 (58.1)	13.9 (57.0)	15.3 (59.5)	18.4 (65.1)	21.5 (70.7)	24.3 (75.7)	26.6 (79.9)	20.8 (69.4)
Mean daily minimum °C (°F)	14.7 (58.5)	14.7 (58.5)	13.1 (55.6)	9.3 (48.7)	5.7 (42.3)	3.0 (37.4)	2.0 (35.6)	2.7 (36.9)	5.2 (41.4)	8.3 (46.9)	11.0 (51.8)	13.3 (55.9)	8.6 (47.5)
Record low °C (°F)	7.7 (45.9)	6.1 (43.0)	3.0 (37.4)	−1.5 (29.3)	−3.7 (25.3)	−5.6 (21.9)	−5.1 (22.8)	−4.5 (23.9)	−3.7 (25.3)	−2.7 (27.1)	1.7 (35.1)	5.4 (41.7)	−5.6 (21.9)
Average rainfall mm (inches)	99.7 (3.93)	82.9 (3.26)	72.2 (2.84)	38.4 (1.51)	44.8 (1.76)	46.3 (1.82)	49.0 (1.93)	40.9 (1.61)	47.8 (1.88)	75.0 (2.95)	79.2 (3.12)	100.2 (3.94)	774.9 (30.51)
Average rainy days (≥ 1.0 mm)	7.1	6.5	6.1	4.1	4.6	5.0	5.0	4.7	5.0	6.2	6.6	7.4	68.3
Source: Bureau of Meteorology

== Demographics ==
In the 2006 census, the town of Wallangarra had a population of 385 people.

In the 2016 census, the locality of Wallangarra had a population of 468 people.

In the 2021 census, the locality of Wallangarra had a population of 440 people.

== Heritage listings ==
Wallangarra has a number of heritage-listed sites, including:

- Wallangarra railway station, Woodlawn Street

== Economy ==
As of 2013, the Wallangarra Stores Depot remains a major Australian Army logistics facility. It is used to store a wide range of engineering and general equipment, clothing, and tents. Bulk fuel storage handling apparatus are also held at the site. The munitions storage facility is also still active in Jennings.

== Education ==
Wallangarra State School is a government primary (Prep–6) school for boys and girls at 50 Callandoon Street (28.9184°S 151.9313°E). In 2018, the school had an enrolment of 76 students with 4 teachers (3 full-time equivalent) and 6 non-teaching staff (3 full-time equivalent).

There are no secondary schools in Wallangarra. The nearest government secondary school is Stanthorpe State High School in Stanthorpe to the north-east.

== Facilities ==
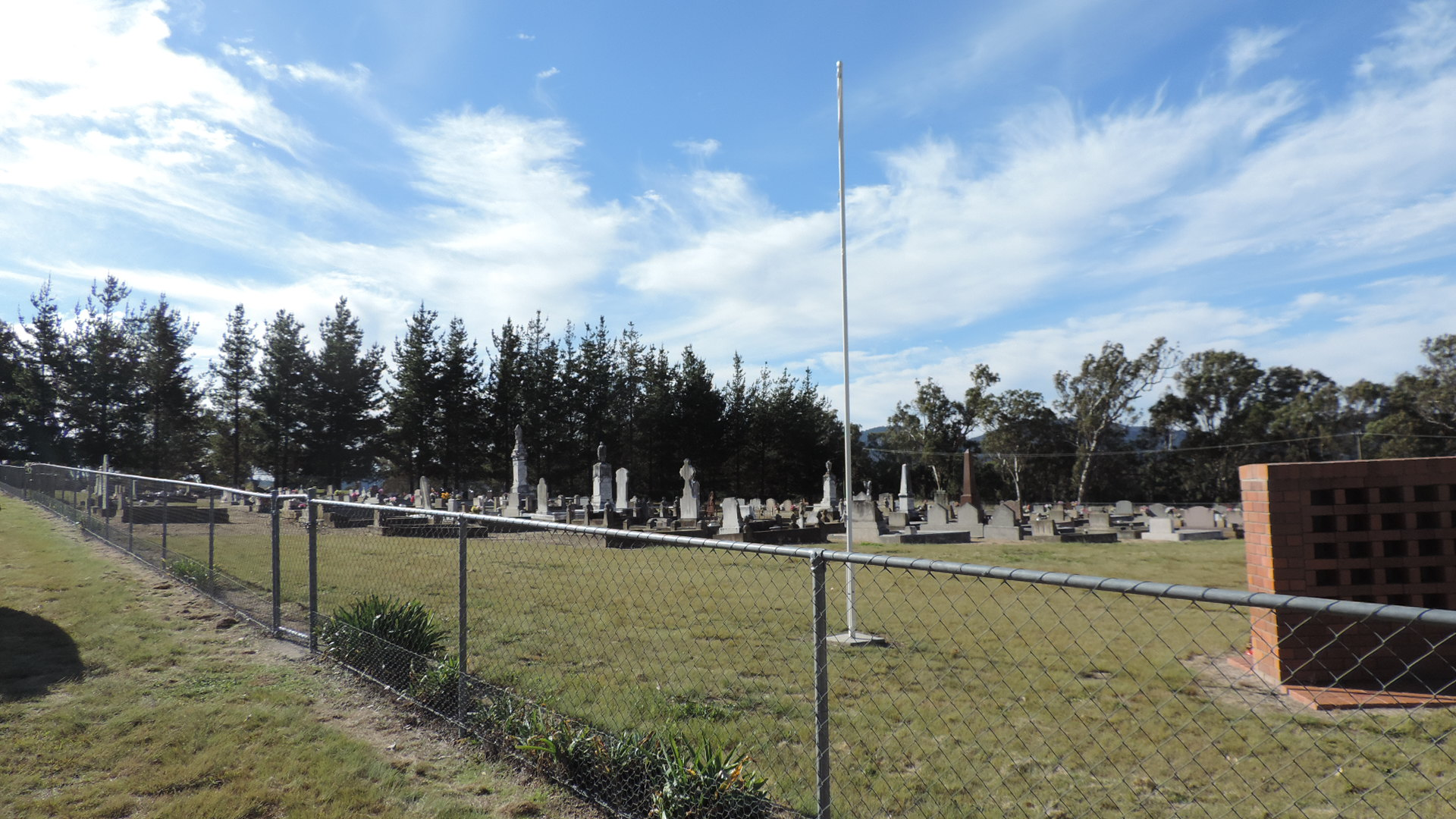
Wallangarra cemetery, 2015

The Wallangarra Cemetery is in McCall Street (28.9188°S 151.9227°E).

== Amenities ==
The Wallangarra branch of the Queensland Country Women's Association has its rooms at 52 Rockwell Street.

Wallangarra Union Church is at 42 Rockwell Street (28.919089°S 151.9329°E).

== Attractions ==
Wallangarra is situated on the picturesque Granite Belt, and is bounded by Sundown National Park to the West and Girraween National Park to the East.

Beehive Dam is 5 kilometres (3.1 mi) north of the town. It is a popular fishing spot as it is stocked with golden perch, Murray cod and silver perch by the Jennings Wallangarra Fishing Club.

== Notable former residents ==
Rugby league legend Billy Moore lived in Wallangarra as a child. He is best known for playing for the North Sydney Bears and the Queensland State of Origin team. He was born in Tenterfield, New South Wales as this was the closest hospital.
