= Shire of Stanthorpe =

- Local government area
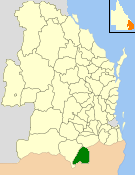
- Location within Queensland

- Country: Australia
- State: Queensland
- Region: Darling Downs
- Established: 1879
- Council seat: Stanthorpe

Area
  - Total: 2,697.6 km^{2} (1,041.5 sq mi)

Population
  - Total: 9,968 (2006 census)
  - Density: 3.69514/km^{2} (9.5704/sq mi)
LGAs around Shire of Stanthorpe
Inglewood	Warwick	Tenterfield (NSW)
Inglewood	Shire of Stanthorpe	Tenterfield (NSW)
Inglewood	Tenterfield (NSW)	Tenterfield (NSW)

The Shire of Stanthorpe was a local government area of Queensland, Australia on the Queensland-New South Wales border. It was on the Great Dividing Range and was part of the Granite Belt. Its main industries included fruit and vegetable growing, wineries and tourism, and sheep and cattle grazing.

The Shire, administered from the town of Stanthorpe, covered an area of 2,697.6 square kilometres (1,041.5 sq mi), and existed from 1879 until 2008, when it amalgamated with the Shire of Warwick to become the Southern Downs Region. Its final mayor was Glen Rogers.

== History ==
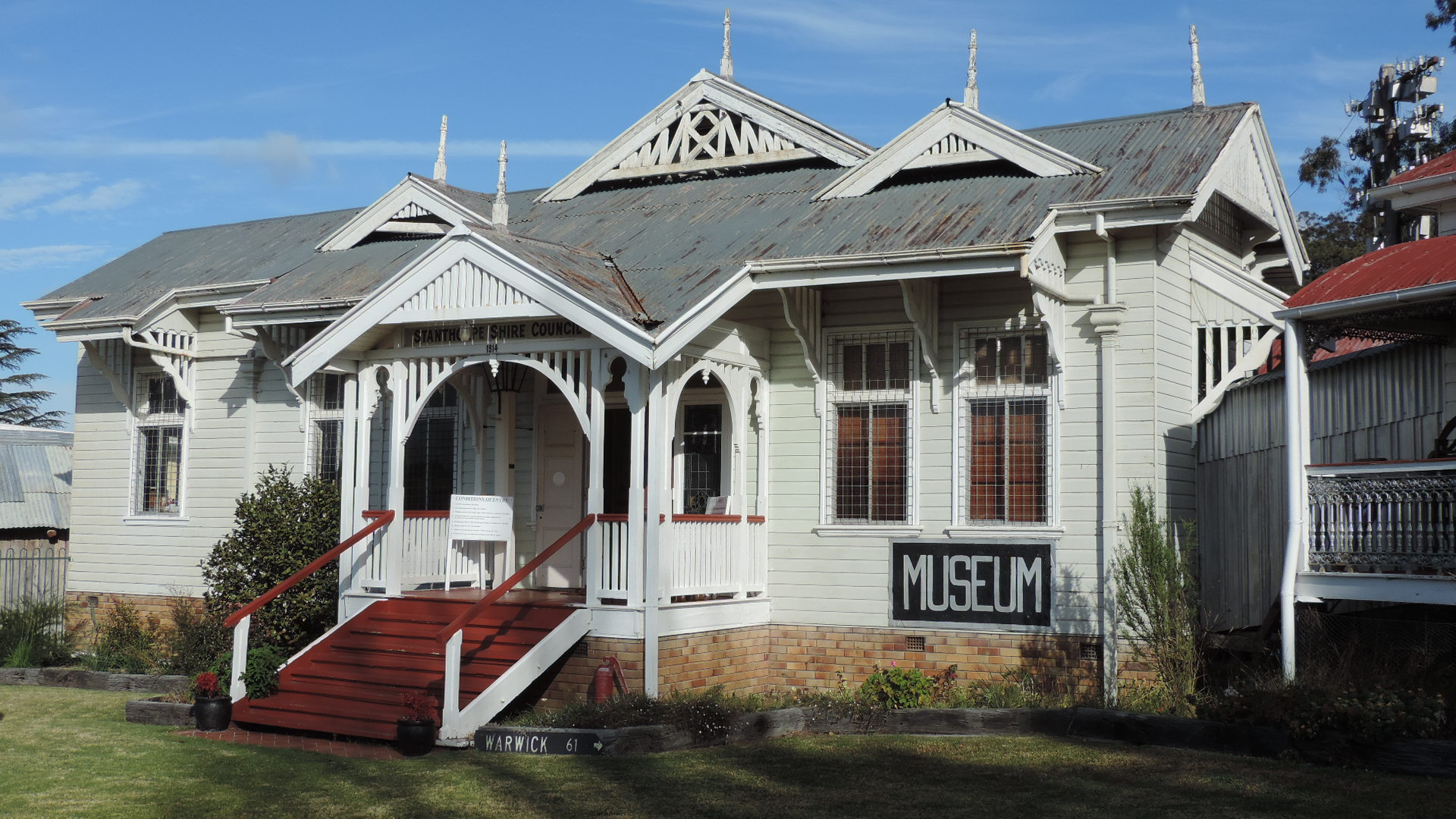
Old Stanthorpe Shire Council Chambers. Built in 1914, now part of the Stanthorpe Heritage Museum, 2015

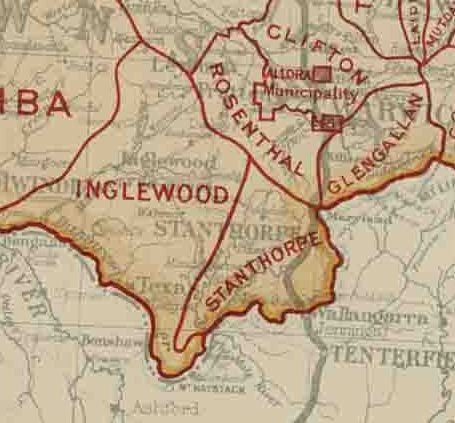
Map of Stanthorpe Division and adjacent local government areas, March 1902

On 11 November 1879, the Stanthorpe Division was created as one of 74 divisions within Queensland under the Divisional Boards Act 1879 with a population of 1339.

On 25 June 1880, Ballandean Division (to the south) was abolished and absorbed into Stanthorpe Division.

With the passage of the Local Authorities Act 1902, Stanthorpe Division became the Shire of Stanthorpe on 31 March 1903.

In 1914, the Stanthorpe Shire Council constructed council chambers.

On 15 March 2008, under the Local Government (Reform Implementation) Act 2007 passed by the Parliament of Queensland on 10 August 2007, the Shire of Stanthorpe merged with the Shire of Warwick to form the Southern Downs Region. At the time of its closure it had eight councillors plus an elected mayor.

== Towns and localities ==
The Shire of Stanthorpe included the following settlements:

- Stanthorpe
- Amiens
- Applethorpe
- Ballandean
- Cottonvale^{*}
- Dalcouth
- Diamondvale
- Eukey
- Glen Aplin
- Greenlands
- Kyoomba
- Lyra
- Messines
- Mingoola
- Passchendaele
- Pikedale
- Pikes Creek
- Pozieres
- Severnlea
- Somme
- The Summit
- Thorndale
- Wallangarra
- Wyberba

^{*} - acquired its name from one Private E Cotton a local who enlisted in the Australian Air Force

== Chairmen ==
- 1927: Johnston Smyth

== Population ==
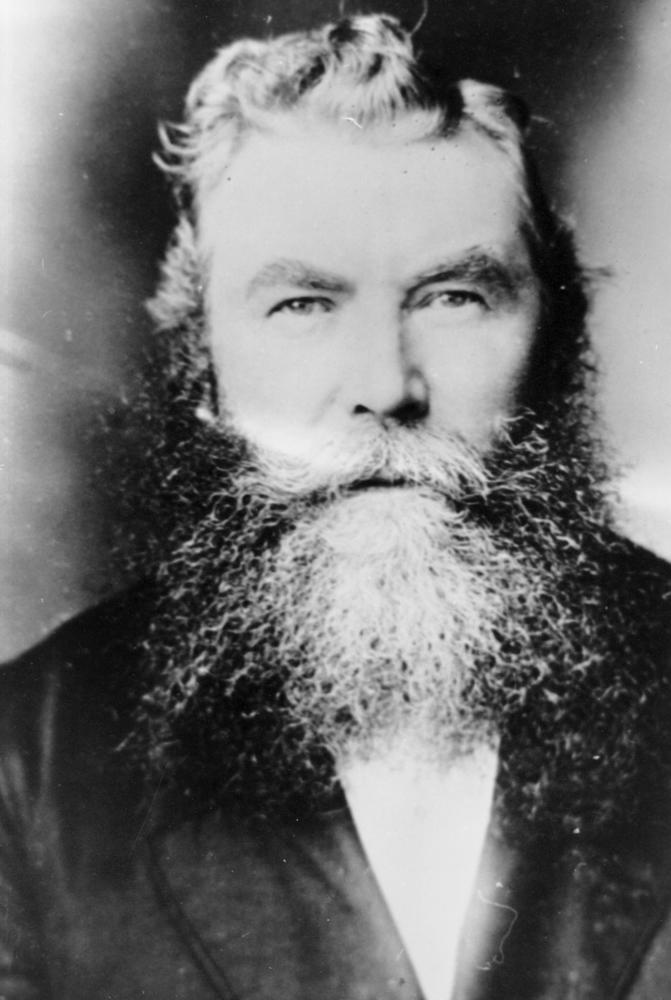
John D. Robertson, member of Stanthorpe Divisional Board

Year	Population
1933	6.934
1947	7,419
1954	8,335
1961	8,514
1966	8,503
1971	8,189
1976	8,709
1981	8,576
1986	9,143
1991	9,556
1996	9,596
2001	9,860
2006	9,968
