= Storm King =

Storm King may refer to:

== Places ==
=== Australia ===
- Storm King, Queensland, a locality in the Southern Downs Region
  - Storm King Dam, a dam in the Southern Downs Region, Queensland

=== United States ===
- Storm King Art Center, in New York
- Storm King Highway, in New York
- Storm King Mountain (New York)
- Storm King School, in New York
- Storm King State Park, in New York
- Storm King Ranger Station, in Washington
- Mount Storm King, in Washington

== Vehicles ==
- USS Storm King (AP-171), a US Naval vessel of the Storm King Class
- Storm King, a GWR 3031 Class locomotive built for and run on Great Western Railway between 1891 and 1915
- Storm King, a ferry operated on Lake Crescent, Washington from 1915 to 1922

== Other ==
- Nickname of James Pollard Espy
- Alternate name of the Great Gale of 1880, a storm in the Pacific Northwest
- The Storm King, a fictional character in the 2017 film My Little Pony: The Movie
- Storm King, an indie speedmetal band established in Pittsburgh, Pennsylvania
- The Storm King, the final boss of Fortnite: Save the World, and a boss fight in Fortnite: Battle Royale
- The Storm King, a fictional title in Girl Genius.

== See also ==
- Storm King Mountain (disambiguation)
