= Eukey =

- Suburb
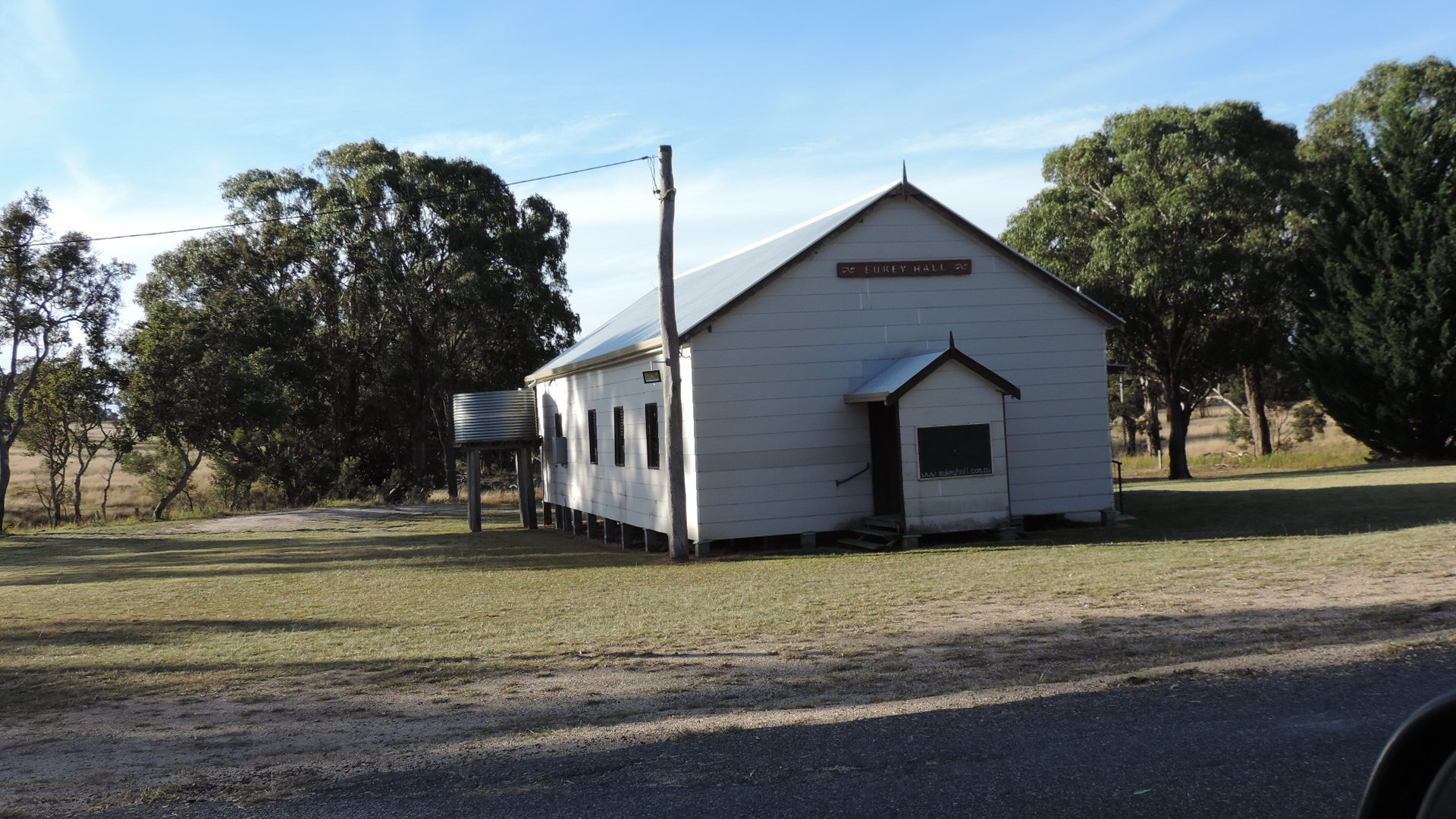
- Eukey Hall, 2015

- Interactive map of Eukey
- Coordinates: 28.7877°S 151.9691°E
- Country: Australia
- State: Queensland
- LGA: Southern Downs Region
- Location: 17.0 km (10.6 mi) SSE of Stanthorpe; 77.0 km (47.8 mi) S of Warwick; 53 km (33 mi) N of Tenterfield; 160 km (99 mi) SW of Toowoomba; 233 km (145 mi) SW of Brisbane

Government
  - State electorate: Southern Downs
  - Federal division: Maranoa

Area
  - Total: 65.1 km^{2} (25.1 sq mi)
- Elevation: 966 m (3,169 ft)

Population
  - Total: 140 (2021 census)
  - Density: 2.15/km^{2} (5.57/sq mi)
- Time zone: UTC+10:00 (AEST)
- Postcode: 4380
Suburbs around Eukey
Mount Tully	Storm King; Sugarloaf	Bookookoorara (NSW)
Fletcher	Eukey	Bookookoorara (NSW)
Ballandean	Girraween	Bookookoorara (NSW)

Eukey (/ˈjuːki/ YOU-kee) is a rural locality in the Southern Downs Region, Queensland, Australia. It is on the border with New South Wales. In the 2021 census, Eukey had a population of 140 people.

== Geography ==
Eukey is predominantly farming land. Doctors Creek flows to the south-west and ultimately is a tributary of the Severn River. McLaughin Creek flows north and merges with the northward-flowing Quart Pot Creek which continues into Storm King Dam before continuing into Stanthorpe.

Eukey Road commences in neighbouring Ballandean to the south-west and passes through Eukey exiting to the north into Storm King towards Stanthorpe.

Occasionally it snows in Eukey.

== History ==
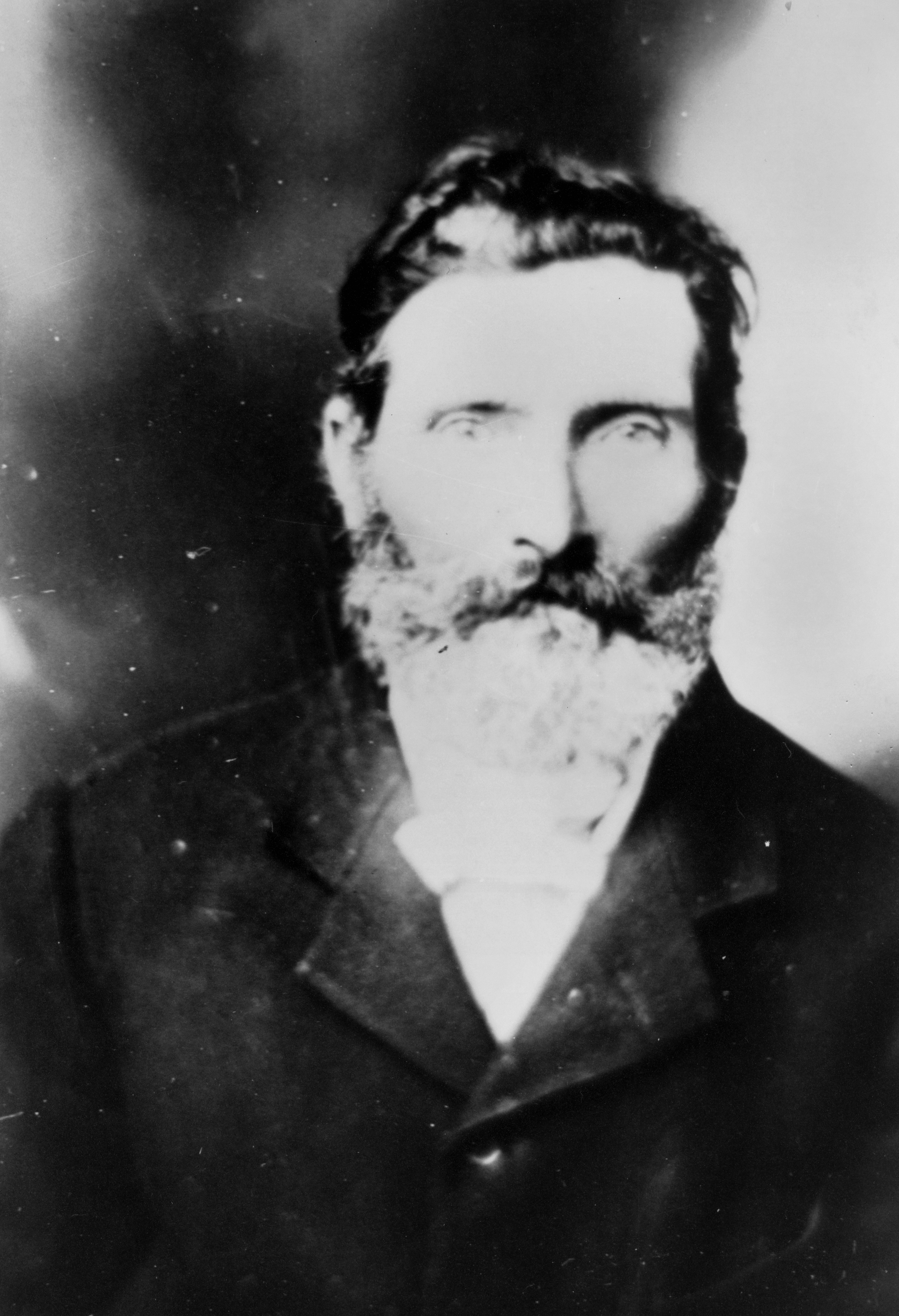
Alexander (Sandy) Ross, 1872

Eukey was originally called Paddock Swamp. It was renamed Eukey in 1905.

In 1872 tin was found in Eukey by Alexander (Sandy) Ross and tin mining commenced in the district. Sandy Ross's land was very wet and so the tin was dredged out by the Paddock Creek Tin Dredging Company.

Eukey State School opened on 25 January 1897 as the Paddock Swamp Provisional School. It became Paddock Swamp State School in 1909 and was renamed Eukey State School in 1916. It closed on 3 April 1964. The school was on the eastern side of Eukey Road, just north-east of the public hall (approx 28.7743°S 151.9744°E).

Eukey Public Hall opened in 1921 and celebrated its centenary on 16 July 2021.

== Demographics ==
In the 2011 census, Eukey and surrounding areas had a population of 510 people.

In the 2016 census, Eukey had a population of 134 people.

In the 2021 census, Eukey had a population of 140 people.

== Education ==
There are no schools in Eukey. The nearest government primary schools are Stanthorpe State School in Stanthorpe to the north, Severnlea State School in Severnlea to the north-west, and Ballandean State School in neighbouring Ballandean to the south-west. The nearest government secondary school is Stanthorpe State High School in Stanthorpe.

== Amenities ==
Eukey Public Hall is at 1212 Eukey Road (corner of Belford Road, 28.7745°S 151.9734°E).
