= Xanthoparmelia paratasmanica =

Scientific classification
- Kingdom: Fungi
- Division: Ascomycota
- Class: Lecanoromycetes
- Order: Lecanorales
- Family: Parmeliaceae
- Genus: Xanthoparmelia
- Species: X. paratasmanica

Binomial name
- Xanthoparmelia paratasmanica Elix (2004)
- Holotype: Mount Marlay, Queensland, Australia

Species of lichen

Xanthoparmelia paratasmanica is a species of foliose lichen in the family Parmeliaceae. Found in montane areas of Queensland, New South Wales, and South Australia, this lichen forms a loosely attached yellow-green structure up to 10 cm wide with flat, elongated lobes. It is distinguished by its spotted upper surface, black lower surface, lack of vegetative propagules, and its chemical composition primarily featuring salazinic acid. This species differs from the similar X. tasmanica by having a spotted rather than plain upper surface, smaller spores, and differently structured rhizines (root-like attachment structures).

== Taxonomy ==
Xanthoparmelia paratasmanica was described as a new species by the lichenologist John A. Elix in 2004. The type specimen was collected at Mount Marlay, 1 km northeast of Stanthorpe, Queensland, Australia at an elevation of 900 metres. The species epithet paratasmanica refers to the similarity of this species to X. tasmanica, with the Greek prefix "para-" meaning "near" or "compared with".

== Description ==
The lichen forms a leafy (foliose) structure that is loosely attached to its substrate surface, growing to 5–10 cm in width. Its lobes are separate, touching, or loosely overlapping, flat, somewhat linear to elongated-linear in shape, branching in patterns that fork into two or somewhat irregularly, and measure 2–4 mm wide. The upper surface is yellow-green, smooth, shiny at the tips, with scattered or patterned spots (maculae), and lacks powdery structures (soredia) and finger-like projections (isidia). The inner layer (medulla) is white, while the lower surface is wrinkled (rugulose), black with dark brown at the tips. The root-like attachments (rhizines) are sparse, simple or clustered in tufts, rarely forked, and black. Reproductive discs (apothecia) have short stalks, measure 2–8 mm wide with pale brown to medium brown centres that become flattened and eventually wavy and distorted. The reproductive spores (ascospores) are oval-shaped (ellipsoid), measuring 8–10 by 4–6 μm. The asexual spores (conidia) are spindle-shaped with pointed ends, 5–7 by 1 μm.

X. paratasmanica is characterised by the loosely adnate thallus, the sublinear to sublinear-elongate lobes, the scattered or effigurate maculae on the upper surface, the black lower surface, the lack of soredia and isidia, and by its medullary chemistry. It contains usnic acid (minor), salazinic acid (major), norstictic acid (trace), and consalazinic acid (trace). While morphologically and chemically similar to X. tasmanica, the latter has an emaculate upper surface and larger, more compact and tightly imbricate thallus. X. paratasmanica has smaller ascospores and often tufted and rarely furcated rhizines.

== Habitat and distribution ==
Xanthoparmelia paratasmanica is known from several montane areas of southern Queensland, eastern New South Wales, and in South Australia. Common associated lichens include Flavoparmelia haysomii, Parmelia signifera, Punctelia pseudocoralloidea, Rimelia reticulata, Xanthoparmelia flavescentireagens, X. scabrosa and other Xanthoparmelia species.

== See also ==
- List of Xanthoparmelia species
