= Storm King, Queensland =

Storm King
- Suburb
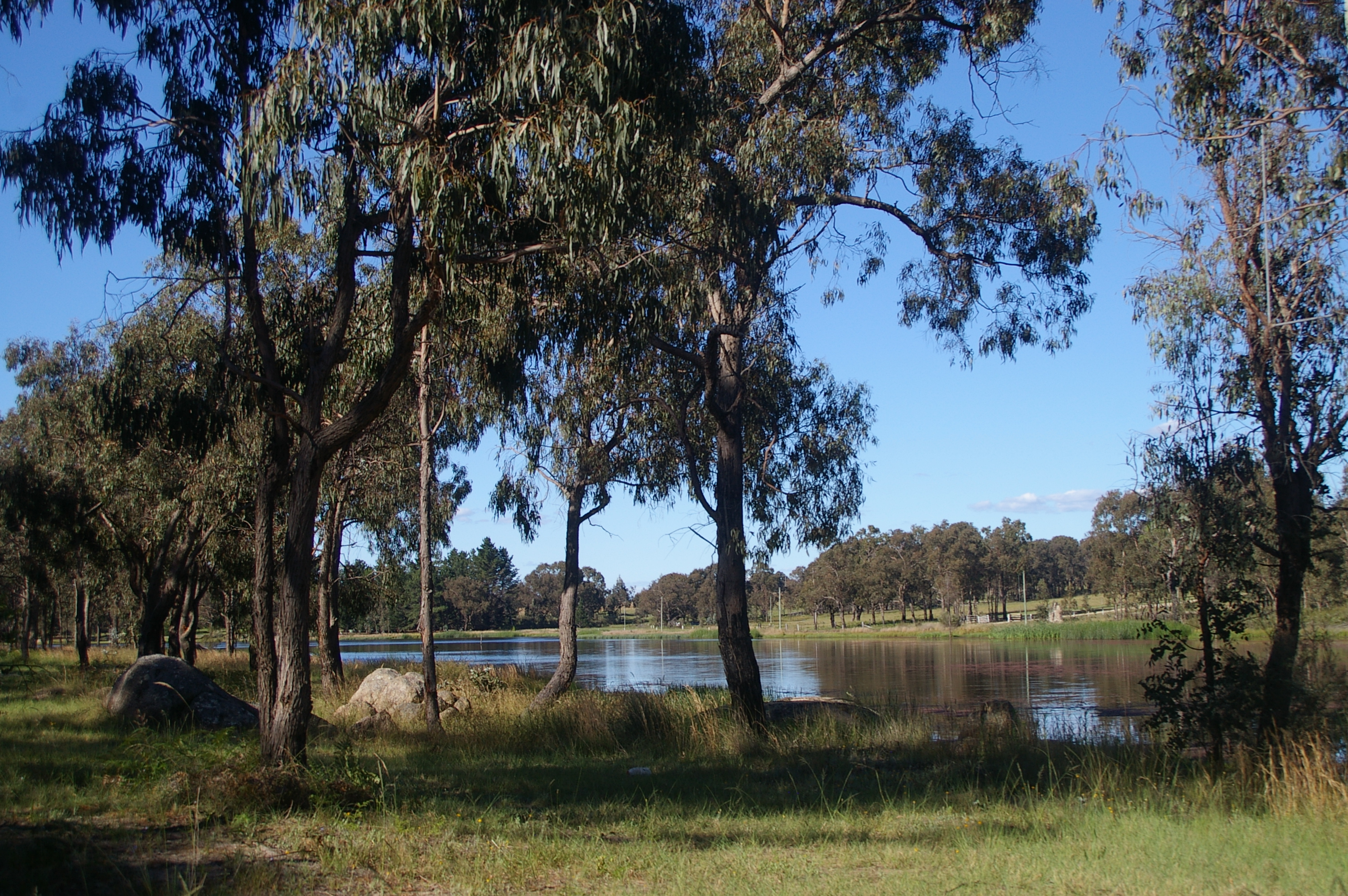
- Storm King Dam, 2008

- Interactive map of Storm King
- Coordinates: 28.7261°S 151.9797°E
- Country: Australia
- State: Queensland
- LGA: Southern Downs Region
- Location: 11 km (6.8 mi) SSE of Stanthorpe; 71 km (44 mi) S of Warwick; 57 km (35 mi) N of Tenterfield; 155 km (96 mi) SW of Toowoomba; 228 km (142 mi) SW of Brisbane

Government
  - State electorate: Southern Downs
  - Federal division: Maranoa

Area
  - Total: 20.5 km^{2} (7.9 sq mi)
- Elevation: 902 m (2,959 ft)

Population
  - Total: 106 (2021 census)
  - Density: 5.17/km^{2} (13.39/sq mi)
- Time zone: UTC+10:00 (AEST)
- Postcode: 4380
Suburbs around Storm King
Stanthorpe	Kyoomba	Sugarloaf
Mount Tully	Storm King	Sugarloaf
Mount Tully	Eukey	Eukey

Storm King is a rural locality in the Southern Downs Region, Queensland, Australia. In the 2021 census, Storm King had a population of 106 people.

== Geography ==
The west of the locality is mountainous and undeveloped. The east of the locality is flatter, contains the Storm King Dam created by impounding Quart Pot Creek. It supplies water both to residents of Stanthorpe and to irrigators.

== History ==
The locality was named and bounded on 15 December 2000. The name presumably comes from the Storm King Dam, which takes its name from the Storm King Mining Company which was established by John Yaldwyn and James Ross, who built an earlier dam for mining purposes. The company, in turn, took its name from the sailing ship Storm King, on which they migrated to Australia, arriving 9 February 1872.

The present dam was first proposed in 1928 but was not built until 1954 by the Stanthorpe Shire Council (now Southern Downs Regional Council). It had filled by February 1954.

== Demographics ==
In the 2016 census, Storm King had a population of 87 people.

In the 2021 census, Storm King had a population of 106 people.

== Education ==
There are no schools in Storm King. The nearest government primary schools are Stanthorpe State School in neighbouring Stanthorpe to the north-west and Sevenlea State School in Sevenlea to the west. The nearest government secondary school is Stanthorpe State High School, also in Stanthorpe.

== Amenities ==
There is a boat ramp and jetty providing access to the dam off Eukey Road via Stanthorpe (28.7154°S 151.9923°E). It is managed by the Southern Downs Regional Council.
