= Sugarloaf, Queensland =

Sugarloaf, Queensland may refer to:

- Sugarloaf, Queensland (Southern Downs Region), a locality on the Darling Downs, Australia
- Sugarloaf, Queensland (Whitsunday Region), a locality on the north-eastern coast, Australia
