= Marlay =

Marlay is a surname. Notable people with the name include:

- Charles Brinsley Marlay (1831–1912), Anglo-Irish landowner and art collector
- George Marlay (1691–1763), Anglo-Irish Anglican priest, Bishop of Dromore
- John Marlay (businessman), chairman of Cardno Limited
- John Marlay (MP) (1590–1673), English merchant, military commander and politician
- Richard Marlay, Dean of Ferns (1769–1787), Bishop of Clonfert and Kilmacduagh (1787–1795)
- Thomas Marlay (British Army officer) (1719–1784), Irish soldier
- Thomas Marlay (judge) (1680–1756), Irish politician and Lord Chief Justice of Ireland

== See also ==
- Marlay Grange, residence of the British Ambassador to Ireland
- Mount Marlay, mountain in the Southern Downs Region, Queensland, Australia
- Marlay Park, suburban public park in Rathfarnham in Dún Laoghaire–Rathdown, Ireland
