= Central Hotel =

Central Hotel may refer to:

== Australia ==
- Central Hotel, Cairns, Queensland, Australia, a heritage-listed building
- Central Hotel, Stanthorpe, Queensland, Australia, a heritage-listed building

== Germany ==
- Central-Hotel, former hotel in Berlin at Friedrichstraße

== Ireland ==
- Central Hotel fire, Bundoran, Co Donegal, Ireland

== United Kingdom ==
- Central Hotel (Glasgow), Scotland
- Central Hotel, Douglas, Isle of Man, one of Isle of Man's Registered Buildings

== United States ==
- Central Hotel (Mount Joy, Pennsylvania), listed on the National Register of Historic Places
