= Mount Tully, Queensland =

Mount Tully
- Suburb
- Interactive map of Mount Tully
- Coordinates: 28.7352°S 151.9458°E
- Country: Australia
- State: Queensland
- LGA: Southern Downs Region
- Location: 11.6 km (7.2 mi) S of Stanthorpe; 71.6 km (44.5 mi) S of Warwick; 53 km (33 mi) N of Tenterfield; 154 km (96 mi) S of Toowoomba; 259 km (161 mi) SW of Brisbane

Government
  - State electorate: Southern Downs
  - Federal division: Maranoa

Area
  - Total: 23.6 km^{2} (9.1 sq mi)
- Elevation: 966 m (3,169 ft)

Population
  - Total: 117 (2021 census)
  - Density: 4.96/km^{2} (12.84/sq mi)
- Time zone: UTC+10:00 (AEST)
- Postcode: 4380
Suburbs around Mount Tully
Severnlea	Stanthorpe	Storm King
Glen Aplin	Mount Tully	Storm King
Fletcher	Eukey	Eukey

Mount Tully is a rural locality in the Southern Downs Region, Queensland, Australia. In the 2021 census, Mount Tully had a population of 117 people.

== Geography ==
The terrain is mountainous and most of the land use occurs in the flatter valleys. The predominant land use is grazing on native vegetation with some horticulture.

== History ==
The locality was officially named and bounded on 15 December 2000. It presumably takes its name from some local mountain peak, but no mountain of that name is current officially gazetted. However, there are historic mentions of that mountain in the area.

Mount Tully State School opened in 1921 under head teacher Ernest L. Schoch. It closed circa 1943. It was on the eastern side of Mount Tully Road (approx 28.71448°S 151.95737°E).

== Demographics ==
In the 2016 census, Mount Tully had a population of 121 people.

In the 2021 census, Mount Tully had a population of 117 people.

== Education ==
There are no schools in Mount Tully. The nearest government primary schools are Severnlea State School in neighbouring Severnlea to the north-west and Stanthorpe State School in neighbouring Stanthorpe to the north. The nearest government secondary school is Stanthorpe State High School, also in Stanthorpe.
