= Kyoomba, Queensland =

Kyoomba
- Suburb
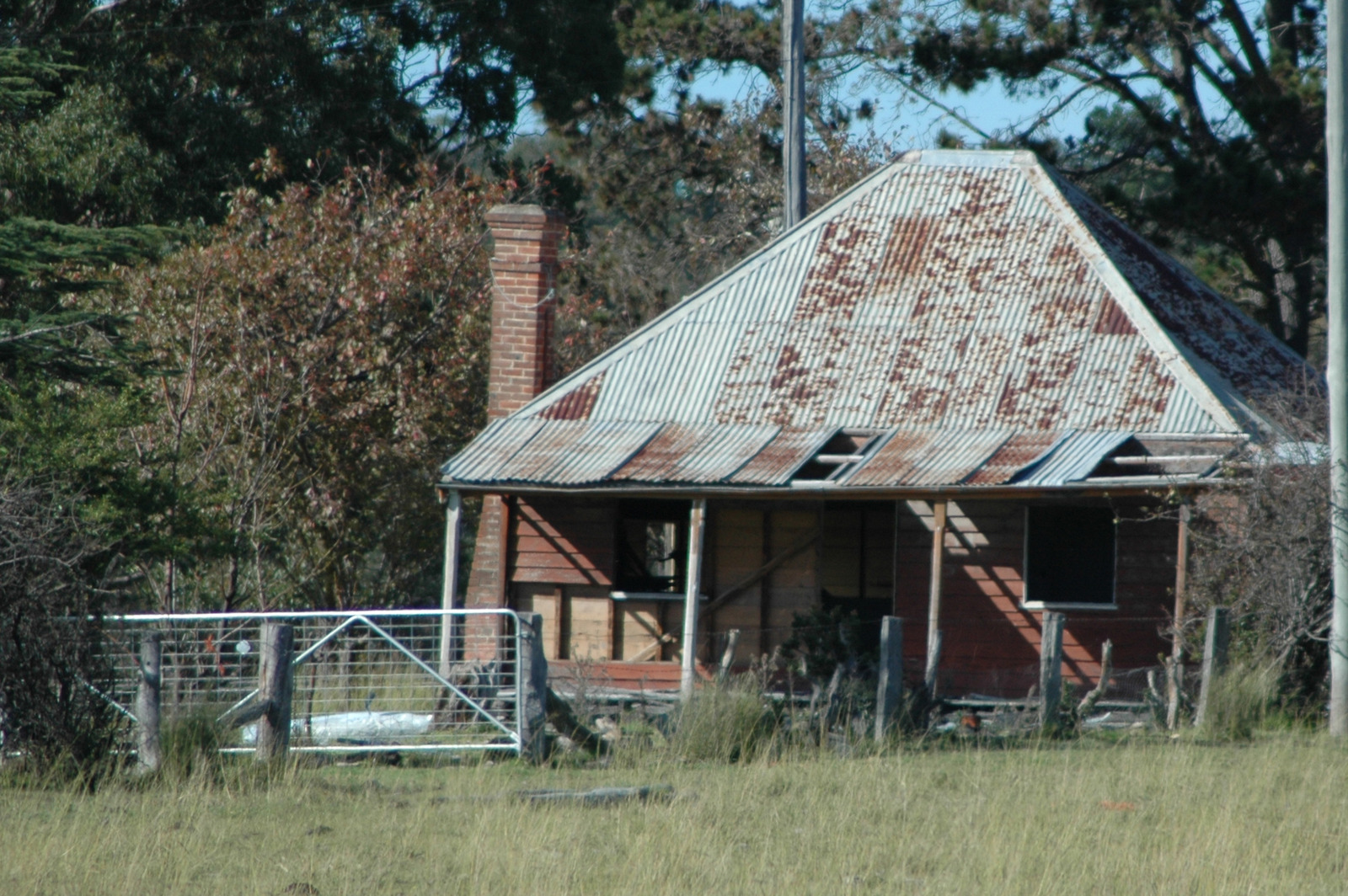
- Former Post Office, Sugarloaf Road, Kyoomba, 2009

- Interactive map of Kyoomba
- Coordinates: 28.6922°S 151.9827°E
- Country: Australia
- State: Queensland
- LGA: Southern Downs Region
- Location: 6.9 km (4.3 mi) SE of Stanthorpe; 67.1 km (41.7 mi) S of Warwick; 62 km (39 mi) N of Tenterfield; 150 km (93 mi) S of Toowoomba; 225 km (140 mi) SW of Brisbane

Government
  - State electorate: Southern Downs
  - Federal division: Maranoa

Area
  - Total: 8.5 km^{2} (3.3 sq mi)
- Elevation: 872 m (2,861 ft)

Population
  - Total: 83 (2021 census)
  - Density: 9.76/km^{2} (25.29/sq mi)
- Time zone: UTC+10:00 (AEST)
- Postcode: 4380
Suburbs around Kyoomba
Stanthorpe	Dalcouth	Sugarloaf
Stanthorpe	Kyoomba	Sugarloaf
Storm King	Storm King	Sugarloaf

Kyoomba is a rural locality in the Southern Downs Region, Queensland, Australia. In the 2021 census, Kyoomba had a population of 83 people.

== Geography ==
Eukey Road forms the western boundary of the locality. Quart Pot Creek flows from the Storm King Dam in Storm King to the south through to the north of the locality and then forms the north-west boundary. Apart from some undeveloped hills in the locality, the land use is predominantly grazing on native vegetation.

== History ==
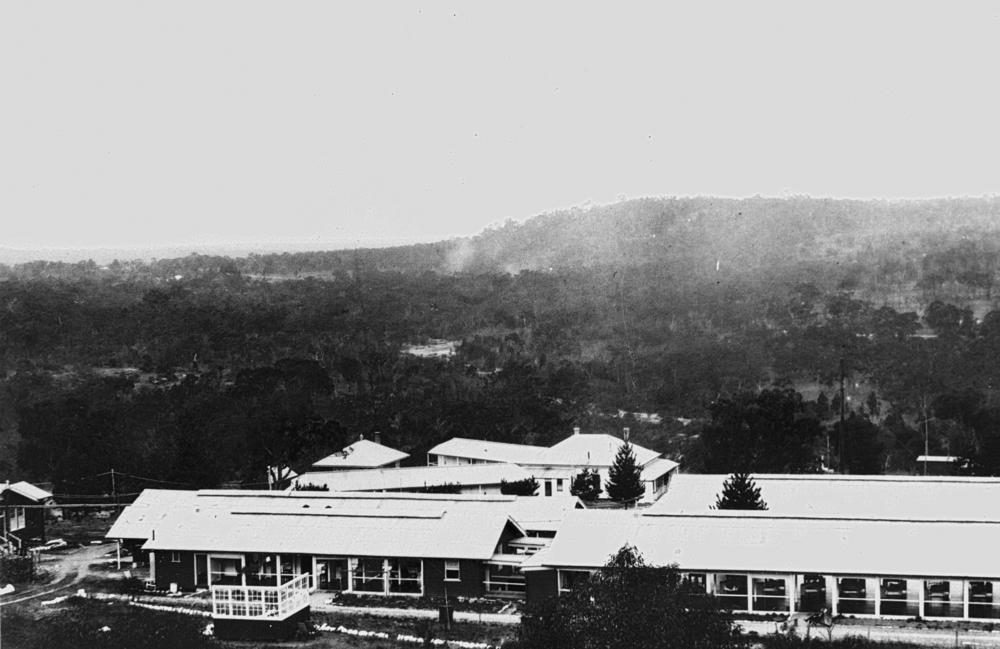
Commonwealth Tuberculosis Sanatorium at Kyoomba, 1925

Margaret Allison (née Dunkeld) opened the Kyoomba Sanatorium in late 1907 under the care of Dr Helen Shaw. During World War I, many Australia soldiers contracted tuberculosis or their lungs were harmed by gas attacks. Allison allowed the Australian Red Cross to use her sanitorium to treat the soldiers. As the number of soldiers needing treatment increased, she transferred control of the sanatorium to the Australian Government in March 1917, which expanded the facilities to treat increasing numbers of soldiers. It became a leading medical facility in Australia. Although some of the soldiers being treated died, the majority recovered and returned to civilian life. By 1935, the sanatorium was no longer needed so it closed, and the buildings and fittings auctioned off in 1937. Some of the buildings were relocated to other sites in the Stanthorpe area.

== Demographics ==
In the 2016 census, Kyoomba had a population of 92 people.

In the 2021 census, Kyoomba had a population of 83 people.

== Education ==
There are no schools in Kyoomba. The nearest government primary and secondary schools are Stanthorpe State School and Stanthorpe State High School in neighbouring Stanthorpe to the north-west.
