= Sugarloaf, Queensland (Southern Downs Region) =

Sugarloaf
- Suburb
- Interactive map of Sugarloaf
- Coordinates: 28.7105°S 152.0358°E
- Country: Australia
- State: Queensland
- LGA: Southern Downs Region
- Location: 11.5 km (7.1 mi) SE of Stanthorpe; 71.4 km (44.4 mi) S of Warwick; 56 km (35 mi) N of Tenterfield; 155 km (96 mi) S of Toowoomba; 229 km (142 mi) SW of Brisbane

Government
  - State electorate: Southern Downs
  - Federal division: Maranoa

Area
  - Total: 51.5 km^{2} (19.9 sq mi)
- Elevation: 910 m (2,990 ft)

Population
  - Total: 162 (2021 census)
  - Density: 3.146/km^{2} (8.15/sq mi)
- Time zone: UTC+10:00 (AEST)
- Postcode: 4380
Suburbs around Sugarloaf
| Dalcouth | Ruby Creek (NSW) | Amosville (NSW) |
| Kyoomba | Sugarloaf | Willsons Downfall (NSW) |
| Storm King | Eukey | Bookookoorara (NSW) |

Sugarloaf is a rural locality in the Southern Downs Region, Queensland, Australia. In the 2021 census, Sugarloaf had a population of 162 people.

Sugarloaf is on the border with New South Wales.

== Geography ==
The locality is bounded to the north and east by the Great Dividing Range which also marks the border with New South Wales. Sugarloaf Mountain (28.6905°S 152.0648°E) is on the eastern boundary as part of the Great Dividing Range; it rises to 1,085 metres (3,560 ft) above sea level.

A number of creeks rise on the slopes of the Great Dividing Range and flow in a general south-west direction becoming directly or indirectly tributaries to Quart Pot Creek.

The land use is predominantly grazing on native vegetation with some plantation forestry and irrigated cropping.

== History ==
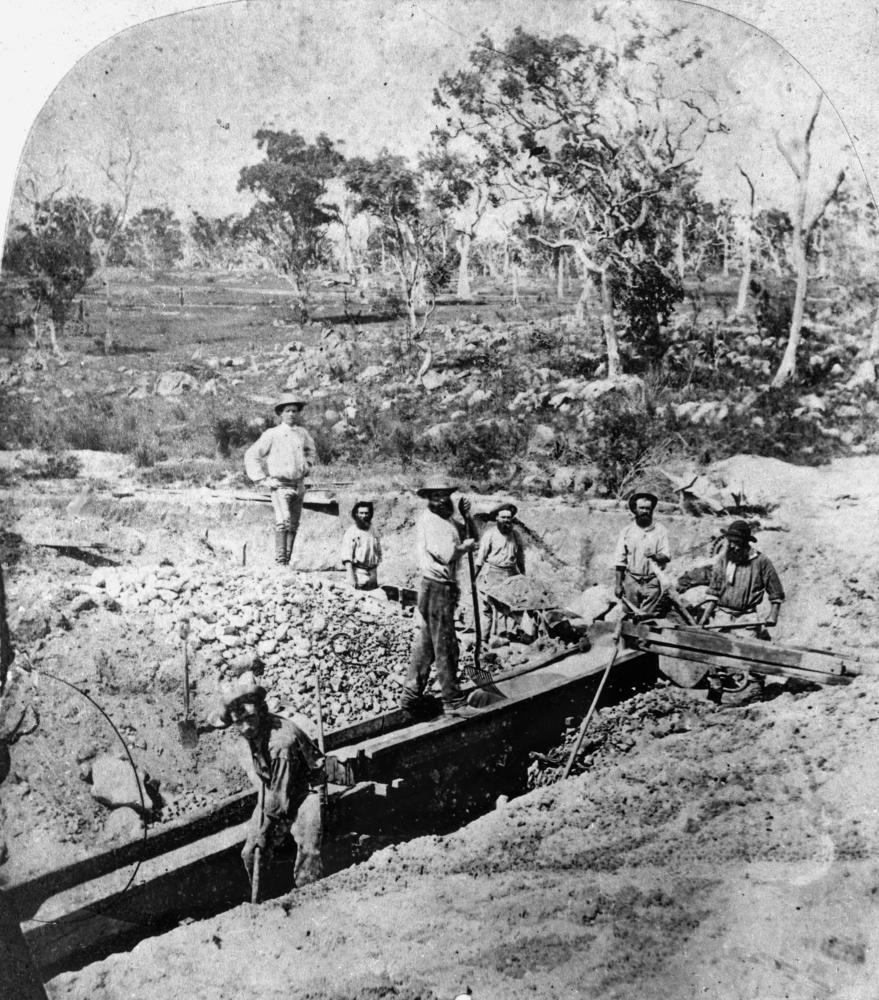
Miners working at St Leonard's Tin Mine, Sugarloaf Creek, circa 1873

The district developed as a mining area as many of the creeks were a source of tin.

In May 1873, there were many men working in the tin mines and there was an urgent need for a school for the "hundreds of children" living in the area. The St Leonard's Tin Mine donated 2 acres (0.81 ha) of land for the school and the residents raised £80 to contribute to its establishment. By 27 May 1874, the school building was "nearly finished". Sugarloaf State School opened on 5 August 1874. It closed in 1939. It was at 1061 Sugarloaf Road (28.6927°S 152.0218°E).

St Patrick's Catholic Church opened in 1910 between April and August. In 1964, it was relocated to Amiens.

== Demographics ==
In the 2016 census, Sugarloaf had a population of 113 people.

In the 2021 census, Sugarloaf had a population of 162 people.

== Economy ==
There are a number of homesteads in the locality, including:

- Glen Robins (28.6957°S 152.0378°E)
- Hillview (28.6963°S 152.0146°E)
- Sugarloaf (28.6981°S 152.0405°E)

== Education ==
There are no schools in Sugarloaf. The nearest government primary school is Stanthorpe State School and the nearest government secondary school is Stanthorpe State High School, both of which are in Stanthorpe to the north-west.

== Facilities ==
Sugarloaf Rural Fire Station is on the southern corner of Sugarloaf Road and Nielsens Road (28.6970°S 152.0040°E).
