= Dalcouth, Queensland =

Dalcouth
- Suburb
- Interactive map of Dalcouth
- Coordinates: 28.6577°S 151.9902°E
- Country: Australia
- State: Queensland
- LGA: Southern Downs Region
- Location: 5.9 km (3.7 mi) W of Stanthorpe; 64.0 km (39.8 mi) S of Warwick; 63 km (39 mi) N of Tenterfield; 147 km (91 mi) S of Toowoomba; 220 km (140 mi) SE of Brisbane

Government
  - State electorate: Southern Downs
  - Federal division: Maranoa

Area
  - Total: 20.1 km^{2} (7.8 sq mi)
- Elevation: 907 m (2,976 ft)

Population
  - Total: 220 (2021 census)
  - Density: 10.95/km^{2} (28.3/sq mi)
- Time zone: UTC+10:00 (AEST)
- Postcode: 4380
Suburbs around Dalcouth
Stanthorpe	Applethorpe	Ruby Creek (NSW)
Diamondvale	Dalcouth	Ruby Creek (NSW)
Stanthorpe	Kyoomba	Sugarloaf

Dalcouth is a locality in the Southern Downs Region, Queensland, Australia. It is on the border with New South Wales. In the 2021 census, Dalcouth had a population of 220 people.

== Geography ==
The locality is loosely bounded by the Great Dividing Range to the north-east and east, which forms the border with New South Wales.

Mount Koola is a mountain in the north-west of the locality (28.6491°S 151.9763°E) which rises to 948 metres (3,110 ft). Koola is an Aboriginal wod meaning koala.

== History ==
Ten Mile Rock Provisional School opened on 27 July 1908. On 1 January 1909, it became Ten Mile Rock State School. In 1915, it was renamed Dalcouth State School. It closed in 1964. It was at 182 Gentle Road (28.6499°S 151.9877°E).

During 2020 and 2021, the Queensland border was closed due to the COVID-19 pandemic. Some border crossing points had Queensland Police checkpoints to confirm eligibility to enter Queensland, while other border crossing points were closed. At Dalcouth, the border crossing on Amosfield Road to New South Wales (28.6346°S 151.9984°E) was only open to local people with no through traffic permitted.

== Demographics ==
In the 2016 census, Dalcouth had a population of 165 people.

In the 2021 census, Dalcouth had a population of 220 people.

== Education ==
There are no schools in Dalcouth. The nearest government primary school is Stanthorpe State School and the nearest government secondary school is Stanthorpe State High School, both in neighbouring Stanthorpe to the west.
