= Storm King Dam =

Dam in Darling Downs, Queensland, Australia

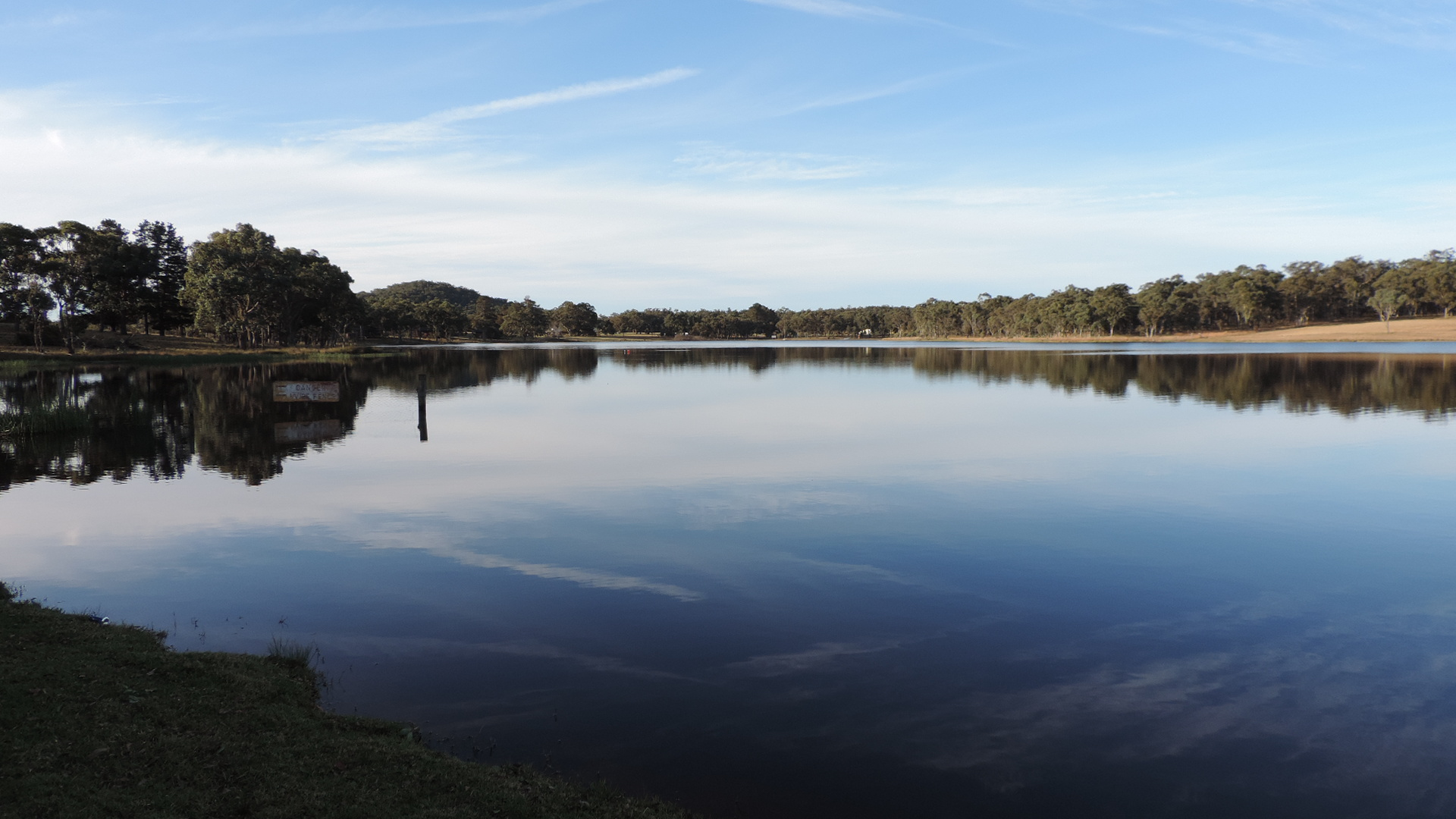
- The dam reservoir in 2015

- Location of the dam in Queensland
- Interactive map of Storm King Dam
- Country: Australia
- Location: Stanthorpe, Darling Downs Queensland
- Coordinates: 28°42′33″S 151°59′35″E
- Purpose: Water supply
- Status: Operational
- Opening date: 1954
- Operator: Southern Downs Regional Council

Dam and spillways
- Type of dam: Gravity dam
- Impounds: Quart Pot Creek
- Height (foundation): 10 m (33 ft)
- Length: 198 m (650 ft)
- Elevation at crest: 879.9 m (2,887 ft) AHD
- Spillway type: Uncontrolled
- Spillway capacity: 273 m^{3}/s (9,600 cu ft/s)

Reservoir
- Total capacity: 2,180 ML (1,770 acre⋅ft)
- Active capacity: 2,065 ML (1,674 acre⋅ft)
- Catchment area: 93 km^{2} (36 sq mi)
- Surface area: 83 ha (210 acres)
- Normal elevation: 880 m (2,890 ft) AHD
- Website sdrc.qld.gov.au

The Storm King Dam is a gravity dam across the Quart Pot Creek, located approximately 8 kilometres (5.0 mi) south-east of Stanthorpe, in the Darling Downs region of Queensland, Australia. Completed in 1954, the dam is sole source of potable water for Stanthorpe.

== History ==
The dam takes its name from the Storm King Mining Company which was established by John Yaldwyn and James Ross, who built an earlier dam for mining purposes. The company, in turn, took its name from the sailing ship HMS Storm King, on which they migrated to Australia, arriving 9 February 1872.

The present dam was first proposed in 1928 but was not built until 1954 by the Stanthorpe Shire Council in the eponymous locality; and the reservoir was filled by February 1954. The dam has been operated by the Southern Downs Regional Council since 2008 and the reservoir supplies water both to residents of Stanthorpe and for irrigation.

The dam wall is 10 metres (33 ft) high and 198 metres (650 ft) long. The resultant reservoir has capacity of 2,180 megalitres (1,770 acre⋅ft) when full, covering a surface area of 830 hectares (2,100 acres), that is drawn from a catchment area of 93 square kilometres (36 sq mi).

In the 1980s, the Memorial School of Arts, established in 1926, was relocated from Amiens to the dam to expand the recreation centre in the youth camp.

During periods of drought, the dam proved inadequate to meet the needs of the community. In 2007, Storm King Dam was carrying as little as two months' supply. In August 2019, the dam was almost dry and plans were being made to truck-in drinking water. The shire council delivered water by truck from approximately January 2020 to March 2021. Following heavy rain on the eastern seaboard in mid-late March 2021, the dam filled and started to spill.

== Recreation ==
The Storm King Dam is available for recreational use, including fishing, water sports, bird watching and picnics. Fish in the dam include Murray cod, yellowbelly and silver perch. The lake attracts many water birds including pelicans. Barbeques and other picnic facilities are available. Boating is permitted on the lake.

There is a boat ramp and jetty off Eukey Road that is managed by the Southern Downs Regional Council.

== See also ==
- List of dams and reservoirs in Australia
