= Central Hotel, Stanthorpe =

Central Hotel
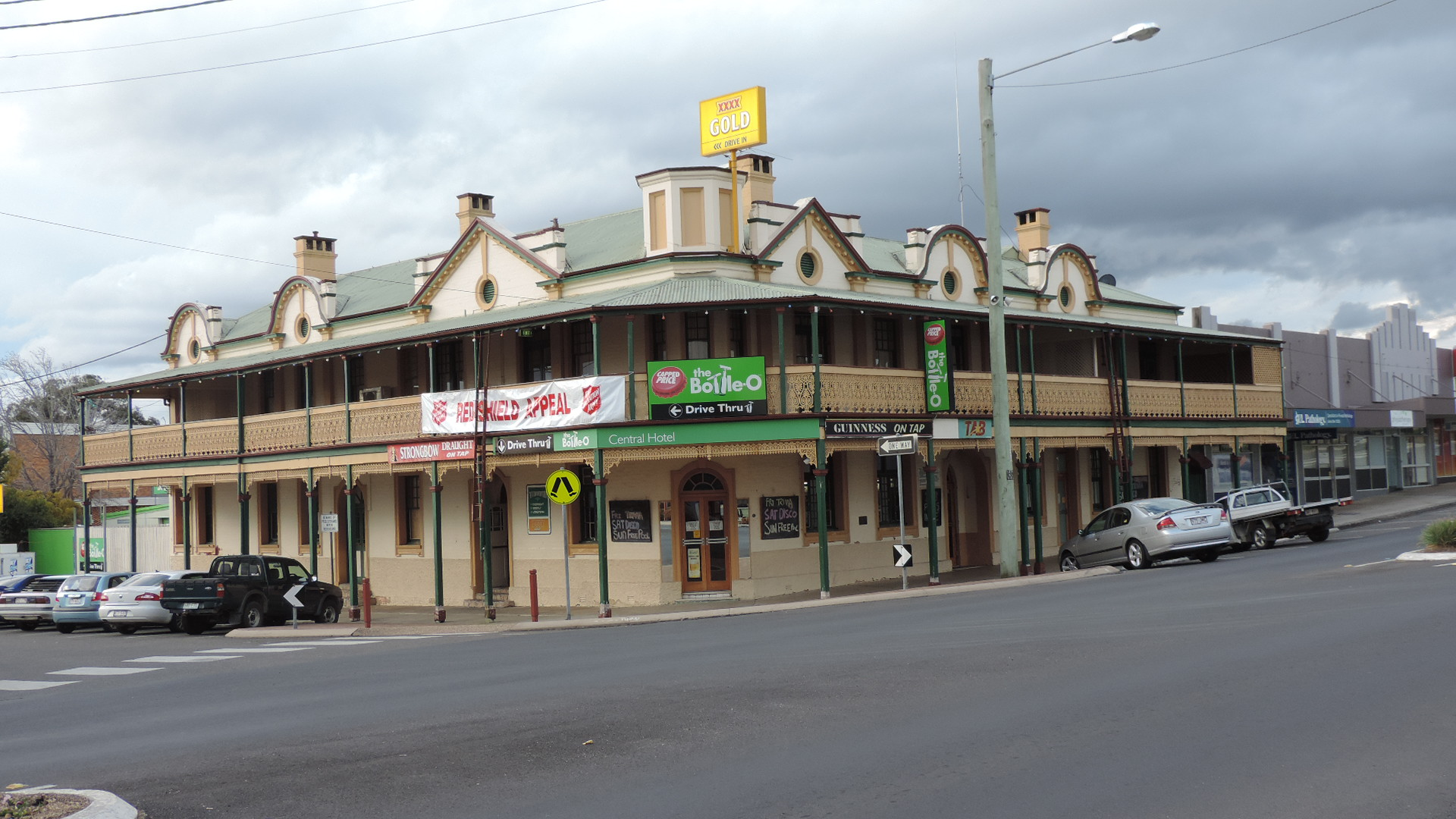
- Central Hotel, Stanthorpe, 2015

- Location within Queensland Location within Australia
- 28.6548°S 151.9344°E
- Location: 140 High Street, Stanthorpe, Southern Downs Region, Queensland, Australia

History
- Design period: 1900–1914 (early 20th century)
- Built: 1908–c. 1978

Queensland Heritage Register
- Official name: Central Hotel, Quinn's Hotel, Sheahan's Hotel
- Type: state heritage (built)
- Designated: 21 October 1992
- Reference no.: 600830
- Significant period: 1900s (fabric); 1909–ongoing (historical use)
- Significant components: fireplace, objects (movable) – retail/wholesale/services

Central Hotel is a heritage-listed hotel at 140 High Street, Stanthorpe, Southern Downs Region, Queensland, Australia. It was built from 1908 to c. 1978. It is also known as Quinn's Hotel and Sheahan's Hotel. It was added to the Queensland Heritage Register on 21 October 1992.

== History ==
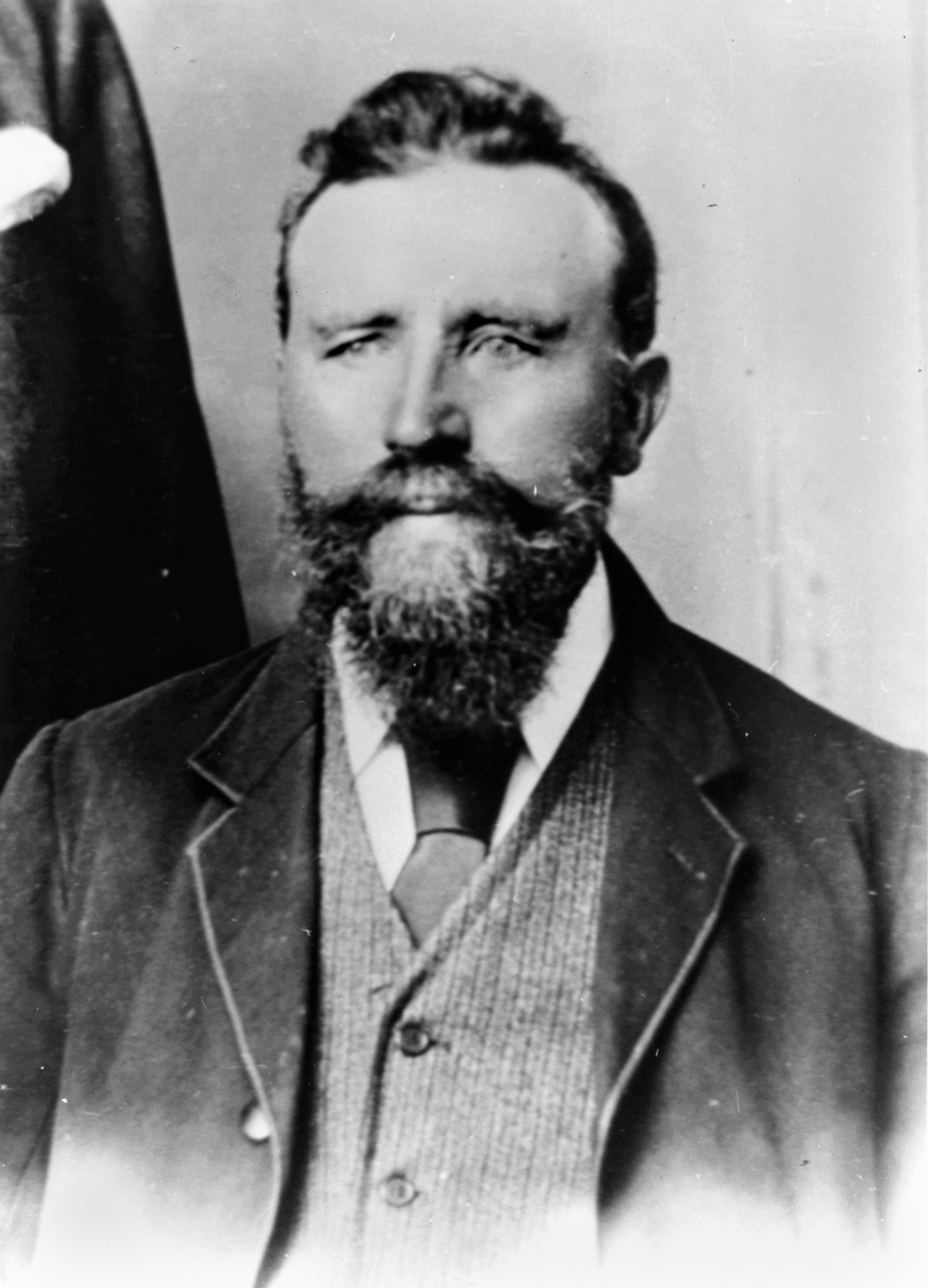
John Sheahan, 1872

The Central Hotel, Stanthorpe was constructed in 1908–09 as Sheahan's Hotel. It was one of the largest buildings in the town at the time of construction.

The major impetus to development in Stanthorpe occurred in 1872 with the start of the practice of alluvial tin mining after discoveries of the valuable metal in the area earlier in the mid 1850s. Stanthorpe become the collective name for two townships which grew as a result of the mining boom and became the only centre on the pastoral Darling Downs to develop with a mining based revenue.

Stanthorpe was situated on part of the early Folkestone Run, which was occupied from November 1846 by Matthew Henry Marsh, who acquired 160 acres (65 ha) of the run on pre-emptive purchase in October 1852. Alford Greenup assumed the management of the run in 1868, and by 1878 as a result of the tin mining boom Marsh converted his run into the private township of Stannum, which is a Latin word meaning tin. The Government surveyed land on each side of Stannum and formed a township known as Stanthorpe. Stannum and Stanthorpe were incorporated forming the town of Stanthorpe. Public sales were held soon after the subdivision of the town into building allotments. The Central Hotel was constructed on land which formed part of the private township.

The Sheahan family, who later opened the Central Hotel, had arrived in Stanthorpe by 1872 when John Sheahan opened the Hibernian Hotel.

The Central Hotel was initially opened as Sheahan's Hotel in 1909. An advertisement in Souvenir of the Stanthorpe District published by L.T. Hobson in 1908 proclaimed:

The Public and Visitors requiring accommodation in Stanthorpe are reminded that Denis Sheahan will open his New Two Story Brick Hotel at the Beginning of the New Year, 1909. Everything New and Up-to-date. Tariff: 4s. & 8s per day, Special arrangements re Permanent Boarders. The largest and best appointed Hotel in South-western Queensland, containing 30 Bedrooms and 4 Parlours. Rooms Large and Airy, with twelve foot wide Balcony all round. Table Unexcelled. The comfort of Patrons carefully studied. Hot and Cold Water Baths. The Proprietor guarantees the Purity and Quality of all his stock of Wines and Spirits; only the very best are served. Letters and telegrams receive prompt attention. Cab meets all trains. 'Phone No. 4.

The hotel remained in the Sheahan family until the early 1920s when Queensland Breweries took ownership and leased the hotel to various managers until it was sold on again to a private owner in 1954. The hotel was known as Quinn's Hotel from at least 1960–1962 after the owner of the time, Lawrence Quinn. From 1962–1963 the hotel was called the Garden Hotel and in 1964 it became the Central Hotel.

In 1978 plans were submitted for a proposed drive-in bottle shop and lounge area together with provision for a liquor service point in the existing lounge of the hotel. The bottle shop now stands adjacent to the hotel on the western side. The ground floor of the hotel has undergone many changes however much of the original plan is still evident. The front public bar which would have originally been two parlours is now an open area, the remains of the dividing wall evident in the ceiling near the front entrance door. A former outdoor area which was formed by the original u-shaped plan of the hotel has been enclosed and is now a lounge area (most likely at the time of the bottle-shop construction).

== Description ==
The Central Hotel, Stanthorpe is a two-storeyed brick building built to the corner of High and Victoria Streets. The hotel has principal facades addressing both Victoria and High Streets and a smaller wing parallel to Victoria Street extending from the northern end of the building. The building is lined with a double-storeyed verandah featuring cast iron balustrading and valancing. The verandahs are supported by double timber posts with capitals.

A striking feature of the building is the parapet decorated with symmetrically positioned projecting arched and trianglular pediments. The decorative parapet is crowned on the front corner of the roof line with a multi-faced turret structure. Four brick chimneys are visible from the road.

The ground floor facades are lined with doors and windows with the main entrance being a double timber door with fanlight on the corner of the building. The upper floor verandah is also lined with glass panelled French doors gaining access to the bedrooms. The corner of the upper level has a large bay window from a bedroom.

A former rear verandah on the upper level has been enclosed at some stage and extending from the rear of this verandah is an addition which enclosed a formerly outdoor area in the centre of the originally U-shape building. This addition has a square lantern roof structure.

On the western side of the hotel facing Victoria Street is a drive-in bottle shop.

The interior of the hotel has been altered, the upper floor being the more intact example of the original design. On the ground floor the public bar extends the length of the High Street elevation and features exposed brick walls and decorative pressed metal ceilings. The bar itself runs lengthways down the room and there is a fireplace at the northern end.

Internal doors at either end of the bar access the rear section of the building. On the southern side of the building the door from the front bar accesses a small hallway with an entrance door to Victoria Street. The hall leads on to two parlour rooms with pressed metal ceilings and brick fireplaces to the west, and the main central staircase to the east. A newer spacious lounge area is located in a central position in the rear section of the building which has the afore mentioned lantern style roof. The upper floor is accessed by the central staircase with original timber balustrading. The ceiling over the staircase retains its decorative pressed metal. The stairs land onto a long north-south hallway which is clad with sheeting material and accesses a large doorway to the southern verandah. Three large bedrooms with original fireplaces line this hallway, all have doors to the verandahs. There are two narrow hallways running east-west on either end of the building each lined with bedrooms on either side. The southerly hallway still displays original Vertical Joint timber work and a decorative arch at its entrance. These hallways are connected by an intersecting hall along the former enclosed verandah at the rear of the building.

== Heritage listing ==
Central Hotel was listed on the Queensland Heritage Register on 21 October 1992 having satisfied the following criteria.

The place is important in demonstrating the evolution or pattern of Queensland's history.

The Central Hotel, a large, two storeyed masonry building was one of the largest buildings in Stanthorpe when constructed in 1908 and demonstrates the development of the town in the early twentieth century, when several large masonry buildings, including the nearby post and telegraph office were constructed.

The place is important in demonstrating the principal characteristics of a particular class of cultural places.

The Central Hotel demonstrates the principal characteristics of large masonry hotels in regional centres of Queensland. Such hotels were designed to attract local custom and to provide superior accommodation for visitors. It remains substantially intact particularly on the first floor, and is a good example of its type in both design and function.

The place is important because of its aesthetic significance.

The hotel is a well composed building situated on a prominent corner contributing significantly to the principal street through Stanthorpe.

The place has a strong or special association with a particular community or cultural group for social, cultural or spiritual reasons.

The Central Hotel is significant for its association with the local community of Stanthorpe as a place of social gathering since the early 20th century.

The place has a special association with the life or work of a particular person, group or organisation of importance in Queensland's history.

The Central Hotel is also significant for its association with the Sheahan family for whom it was constructed. The Sheahans were prominent locals who ran several of the town's many hotels in the nineteenth and early twentieth centuries.
