= Storm King Mountain =

Storm King Mountain may refer to several mountain peaks in the United States:

- Storm King Mountain (Garfield County, Colorado), site of the 1994 South Canyon Fire
- Storm King Mountain (Saguache County, Colorado)
- Storm King Mountain (New York)
- Storm King Mountain (Ferry County, Washington)
- Storm King Mountain (Lewis County, Washington)
- Mount Storm King (Clallam County, Washington)
