= Diamondvale, Queensland =

Diamondvale
- Suburb
- Interactive map of Diamondvale
- Coordinates: 28.6636°S 151.9616°E
- Country: Australia
- State: Queensland
- LGA: Southern Downs Region
- Location: 3.9 km (2.4 mi) W of Stanthorpe; 62.9 km (39.1 mi) S of Warwick; 60 km (37 mi) N of Tenterfield; 146 km (91 mi) S of Toowoomba; 221 km (137 mi) SW of Brisbane

Government
  - State electorate: Southern Downs
  - Federal division: Maranoa

Area
  - Total: 3.6 km^{2} (1.4 sq mi)
- Elevation: 843 m (2,766 ft)

Population
  - Total: 52 (2021 census)
  - Density: 14.4/km^{2} (37.4/sq mi)
- Time zone: UTC+10:00 (AEST)
- Postcode: 4380
Suburbs around Diamondvale
Stanthorpe	Stanthorpe	Dalcouth
Stanthorpe	Diamondvale	Dalcouth
Stanthorpe	Stanthorpe	Dalcouth

Diamondvale is a rural locality in the Southern Downs Region, Queensland, Australia. In the 2021 census, Diamondvale had a population of 52 people.

== Geography ==
The locality is bounded by Quart Pot Creek to the south and Kettle Swamp Creek to the north-west.

The predominant land use is grazing on native vegetation.

== History ==
The locality was named and bounded on 15 December 2000.

== Demographics ==
In the 2016 census, Diamondvale had a population of 50 people.

In the 2021 census, Diamondvale had a population of 52 people.

== Education ==
There are no schools in Diamondvale. The nearest government primary and secondary schools are Stanthorpe State School and Stanthorpe State High School in neighbouring Stanthorpe to the west.
