= Mount Marlay =

Mountain in Queensland, Australia

Coordinates: 28°39′12″S 151°56′49″E

Mount Marlay is a mountain in the Southern Downs Region, Queensland, Australia.

== Geography ==
Mount Marley is just to the north-east of the town of Stanthorpe. It is just over 910 metres above sea level, about 100 metres higher than the town.

== History ==
The mountain is probably named after Edward Marlay, a selector and tin miner, who purchased land in Stanthorpe in 1872.
