= Severnlea, Queensland =

Severnlea
- Suburb
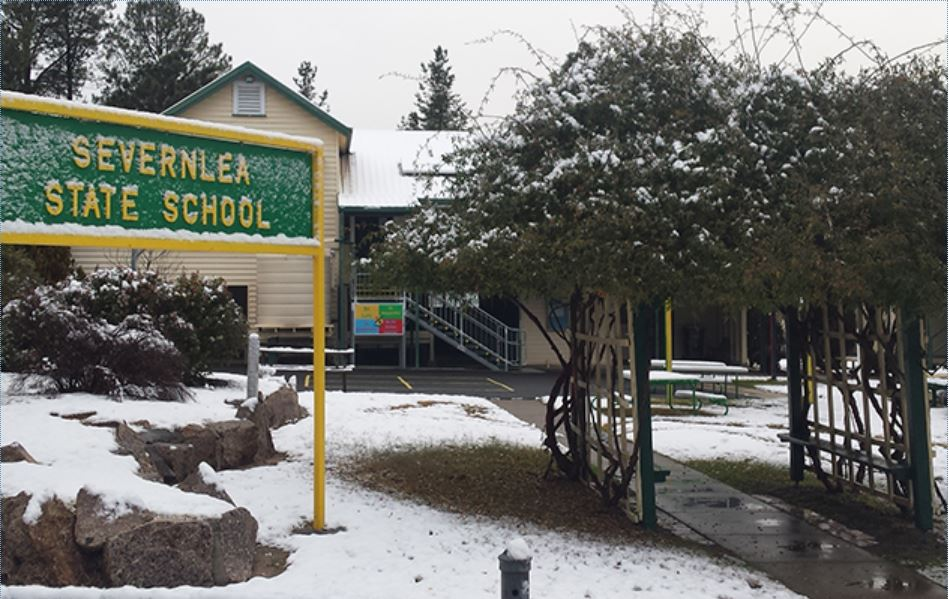
- Severnlea State School with snow

- Interactive map of Severnlea
- Coordinates: 28.7041°S 151.9158°E
- Country: Australia
- State: Queensland
- LGA: Southern Downs Region
- Location: 6.2 km (3.9 mi) SE of Stanthorpe; 67.5 km (41.9 mi) SSW of Warwick; 50.4 km (31.3 mi) N of Tenterfield; 150 km (93 mi) S of Toowoomba; 225 km (140 mi) SW of Brisbane

Government
  - State electorate: Southern Downs
  - Federal division: Maranoa

Area
  - Total: 27.5 km^{2} (10.6 sq mi)
- Elevation: 777 m (2,549 ft)

Population
  - Total: 382 (2021 census)
  - Density: 13.89/km^{2} (35.98/sq mi)
- Time zone: UTC+10:00 (AEST)
- Postcode: 4352
Suburbs around Severnlea
Broadwater	Stanthorpe	Stanthorpe
Thorndale	Severnlea	Mount Tully
Glen Aplin	Mount Tully	Mount Tully

Severnlea is a semi-rural locality in the Southern Downs Region, Queensland, Australia. In the 2021 census, Severnlea had a population of 382 people.

== Geography ==
Severnlea is immediately south of the town of Stanthorpe.

The New England Highway and the Southern railway line pass through the locality from north (Stanthorpe) to south (Glen Alpin). The locality was historically served by the now-abandoned Severnlea railway station (28.7024°S 151.9066°E).

The Severn River also flows from north to south to the west of the highway and railway.

The land use is a mixture of rural residential housing, grazing on native vegetation, and crop growing.

== History ==
The locality presumably takes its name from the Severn River.

Beverley State School opened on 30 October 1918. On 15 November 1922, it was renamed Severnlea State School.

Severnlea Methodist Church opened in 1948. When the Methodist Church amalgamated into the Uniting Church in Australia in 1977, it became Severnlea Uniting Church.

Mount Tully Community School opened on 23 February 1985 and closed on 31 December 1994.

== Demographics ==
In the 2016 census, Severnlea had a population of 350 people.

In the 2021 census, Severnlea had a population of 382 people.

== Education ==
Severnlea State School is a government primary (Prep-6) school for boys and girls at 14 Turner Road (28.7023°S 151.9087°E). In 2017, the school had an enrolment of 61 students with 4 teachers (3 full-time equivalent) and 5 non-teaching staff (3 full-time equivalent). In 2018, the school had an enrolment of 63 students with 5 teachers (4 full-time equivalent) and 5 non-teaching staff (3 full-time equivalent).

There are no secondary schools in Severnlea. The nearest government secondary school is Stanthorpe State High School in neighbouring Stanthorpe to the north.

== Amenities ==
Severnlea Uniting Church is at 440 Whiskey Gully Road (28.7151°S 151.9237°E).
