= Stanthorpe, Queensland =

Stanthorpe
- Town
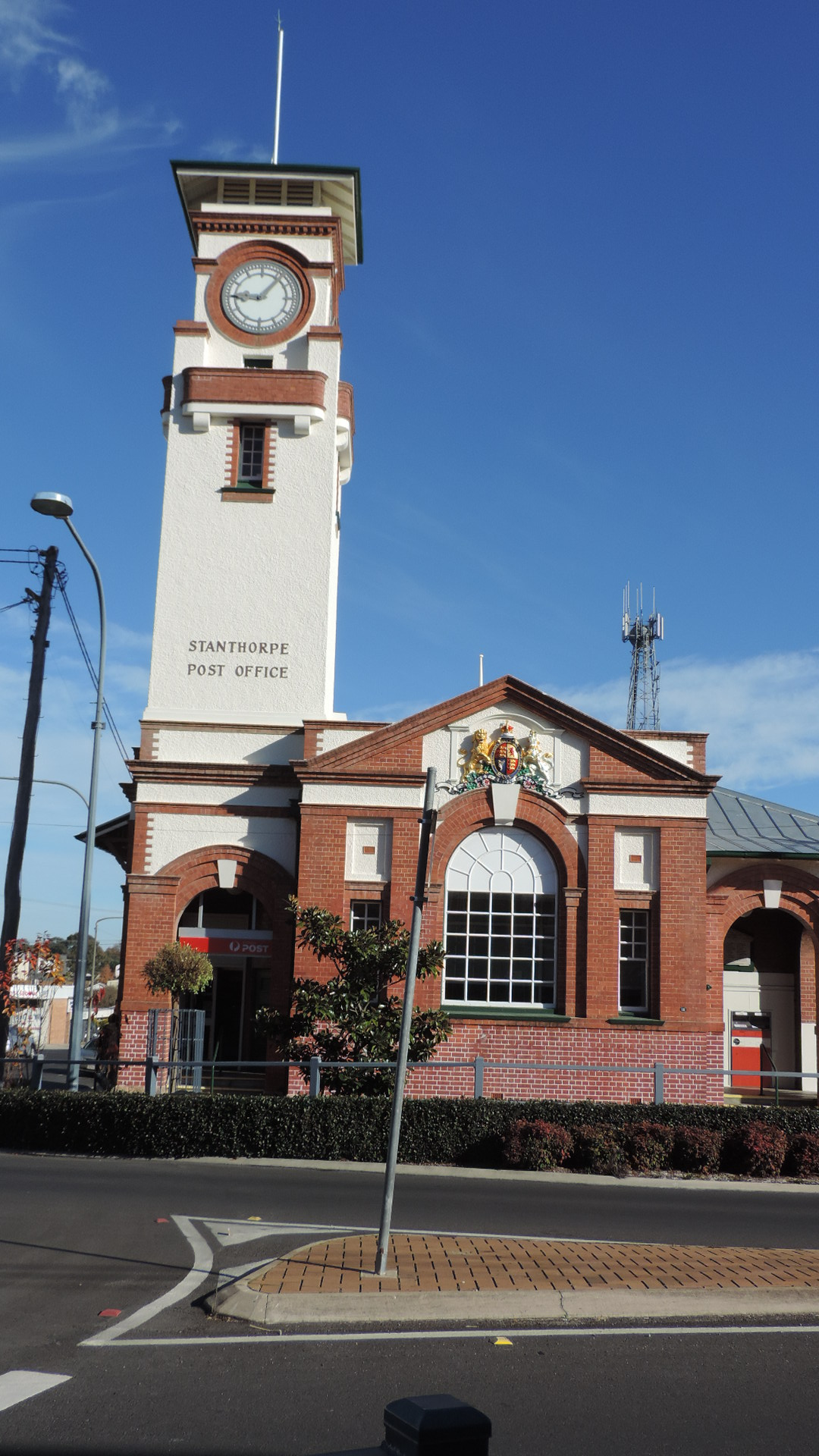
- Stanthorpe Post Office, 2015

- Interactive map of Stanthorpe
- Coordinates: 28.6547°S 151.935°E
- Country: Australia
- State: Queensland
- LGA: Southern Downs Region
- Location: 56 km (35 mi) N of Tenterfield; 60.2 km (37.4 mi) SSW of Warwick; 143 km (89 mi) S of Toowoomba; 217 km (135 mi) SW of Brisbane

Government
  - State electorate: Southern Downs
  - Federal division: Maranoa

Area
  - Total: 33.8 km^{2} (13.1 sq mi)
- Elevation: 690–924 m (2,264–3,031 ft)

Population
  - Total: 5,286 (2021 census)
  - Density: 156.39/km^{2} (405.0/sq mi)
- Time zone: UTC+10:00 (AEST)
- Postcode: 4380
- County: Bentinck
- Parish: Stanthorpe, Broadwater, Folkestone
- Mean max temp: 21.8 °C (71.2 °F)
- Mean min temp: 8.9 °C (48.0 °F)
- Annual rainfall: 763.8 mm (30.07 in)
Localities around Stanthorpe
Applethorpe	Applethorpe	Dalcouth
Broadwater	Stanthorpe	Diamondvale
Severnlea	Mount Tully	Kyoomba; Storm King

Stanthorpe is a rural town and locality in the Southern Downs Region, Queensland, Australia. In the 2021 census, the locality of Stanthorpe had a population of 5,286 people.

The area surrounding the town is known as the Granite Belt.

== Geography ==
Stanthorpe lies on the New England Highway near the New South Wales border 223 kilometres (139 mi) from Brisbane via Warwick, 56 kilometres (35 mi) north of Tenterfield and 811 metres or 2,661 feet above sea level. A record low temperature of 12.9 °F or −10.6 °C was registered on June 23, 1961 in Stanthorpe. This is the lowest temperature recorded in Queensland.

Stanthorpe was developed around Quart Pot Creek which meanders from south-east through the centre of town and then out through the south-west, where its confluence with Spring Creek forms the Severn River. Quart Pot Creek forms part of the south-western boundary of the locality, while the Severn River forms part of the south-western boundary.

The New England Highway passes through the locality from Applethorpe in the north to Severnlea in the south. Originally it passed through the town centre along the main street, Maryland Street. However, it now bypasses to the west of the main developed area of the town. The Stanthorpe–Texas–Inglewood Road connects Stanthorpe and Broadwater to the west, then travels south-west to Texas.

The land within the boundaries of Stanthorpe is primarily used for urban purposes: housing, recreational, commercial and industrial with some undeveloped land on the hillier slopes. Although an agricultural centre of the Granite Belt, there is little agriculture within the town's boundaries. Crops grown in the surrounding area include vegetables, apples, grapes and stone fruit. Wine is also produced in the area, and sheep and cattle grazing is also prevalent.

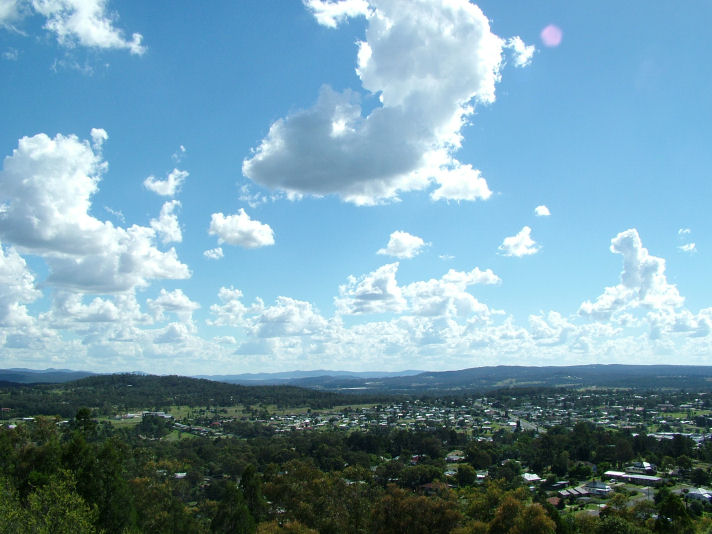
South-West aspect of Stanthorpe Township as seen from Mt Marlay

The town lies in the valley of Quart Pot Creek and its tributary Funkers Gap Creek (28.6511°S 151.9286°E) at 690 metres (2,260 ft) above sea level.

The locality has the following mountains:

- Lees Hill, south of the town (28.6764°S 151.9324°E) 906 metres (2,972 ft)
- Mount Banca, north-west of the town (28.6428°S 151.9244°E) 924 metres (3,031 ft)
- Mount Marlay, north-east of the town (28.6536°S 151.9470°E) 918 metres (3,012 ft)

== History ==
Prior to British settlement, the Kambuwal were an Indigenous Australian people of the state of Queensland. Norman Tindale estimated that the Kambuwal's territory stretched over 3,700 square miles (9,600 km^{2}). They straddled the border between Queensland and New South Wales, from south of Millmerran, and Inglewood to Bonshaw. Their eastern flank ended around Stanthorpe, Wallangarra and the western scarp of the Great Dividing Range.

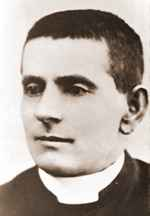
Father Jerome Davadi, promoter of wine growing in the Stanthorpe area

Stanthorpe was founded by tin miners. People came from many countries to mine tin from 1872. Prior to 1872 this area boasted some large pastoral runs and a few prospectors in bark huts. At that time, the area was known as 'Quart Pot Creek'. The Private Township of Stannum existed in the area along one side of the present main street. With the discovery of tin and the influx of miners and new businesses, a 'more suitable' name was sought by the town fathers. Thus, Stanthorpe became the name which encompassed all, as this area became for a time, the largest alluvial tin mining and mineral field in Queensland. Stanthorpe literally means 'tintown', as Stannum is Latin for 'tin' and thorpe is Middle English for 'village'. The Queensland Surveyor General, Augustus Charles Gregory, is credited with coining the name in 1872.

When the tin prices fell, many miners turned to farming. The subtropical highland climate was very suitable for growing cool climate fruits and vegetables. Grapes were first planted here in the 1860s with encouragement from the local Catholic parish priest Father Jerome Davadi to produce altar wine. His Italian descent made grape growing and wine production a familiar pastime and the notion caught on in the area. There were plenty of Italian settlers and wine was made for home enjoyment.

Mount Marlay was named after Edward Marlay, a selector and tin miner. On 3 July 1872 he purchased Allotment 1, Section 1 in the Town of Stanthorpe.

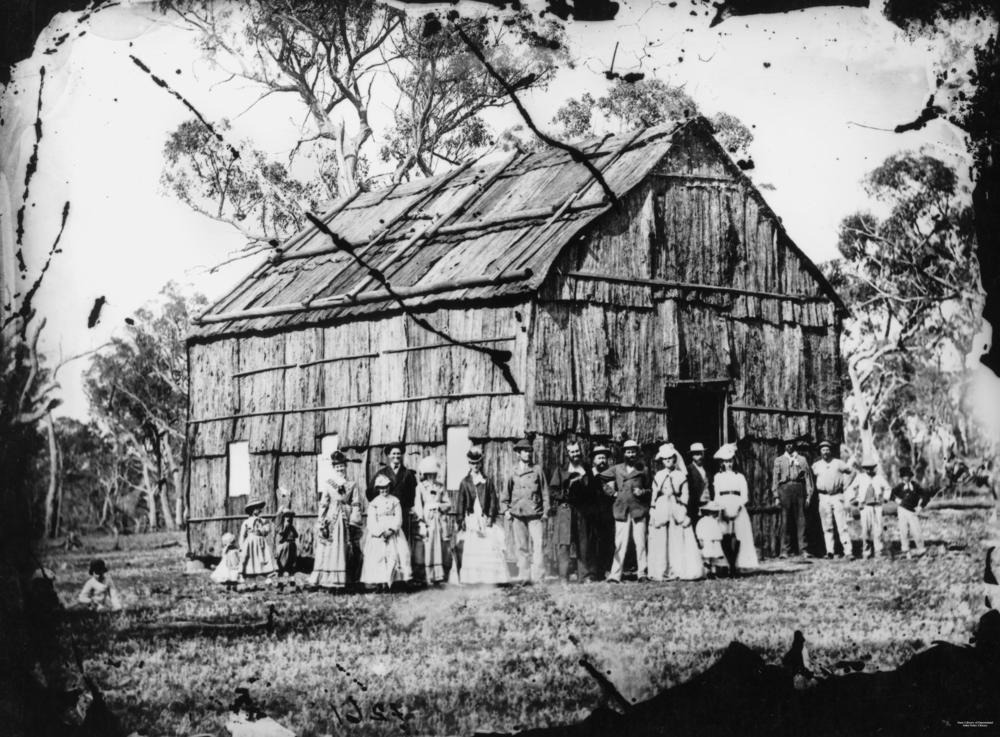
Wedding at Stanthorpe's Presbyterian Church, December 1872

In July 1872, Presbyterian minister John McAra arrived in Stanthorpe and established a congregation. On 17 November 1872, the Stanthorpe Presbyterian Church was opened by the Reverend Colin McCulloch.

St Joseph's Catholic School was established in October 1872 by four Sisters of Mercy: Sisters M Agnes, Emilian, Muredach and Malachy.

Stanthorpe State School opened on 9 March 1874.

On Tuesday 3 May 1881, the Southern railway line was officially opened to Stanthorpe by the Queensland Colonial Secretary, Arthur Palmer.

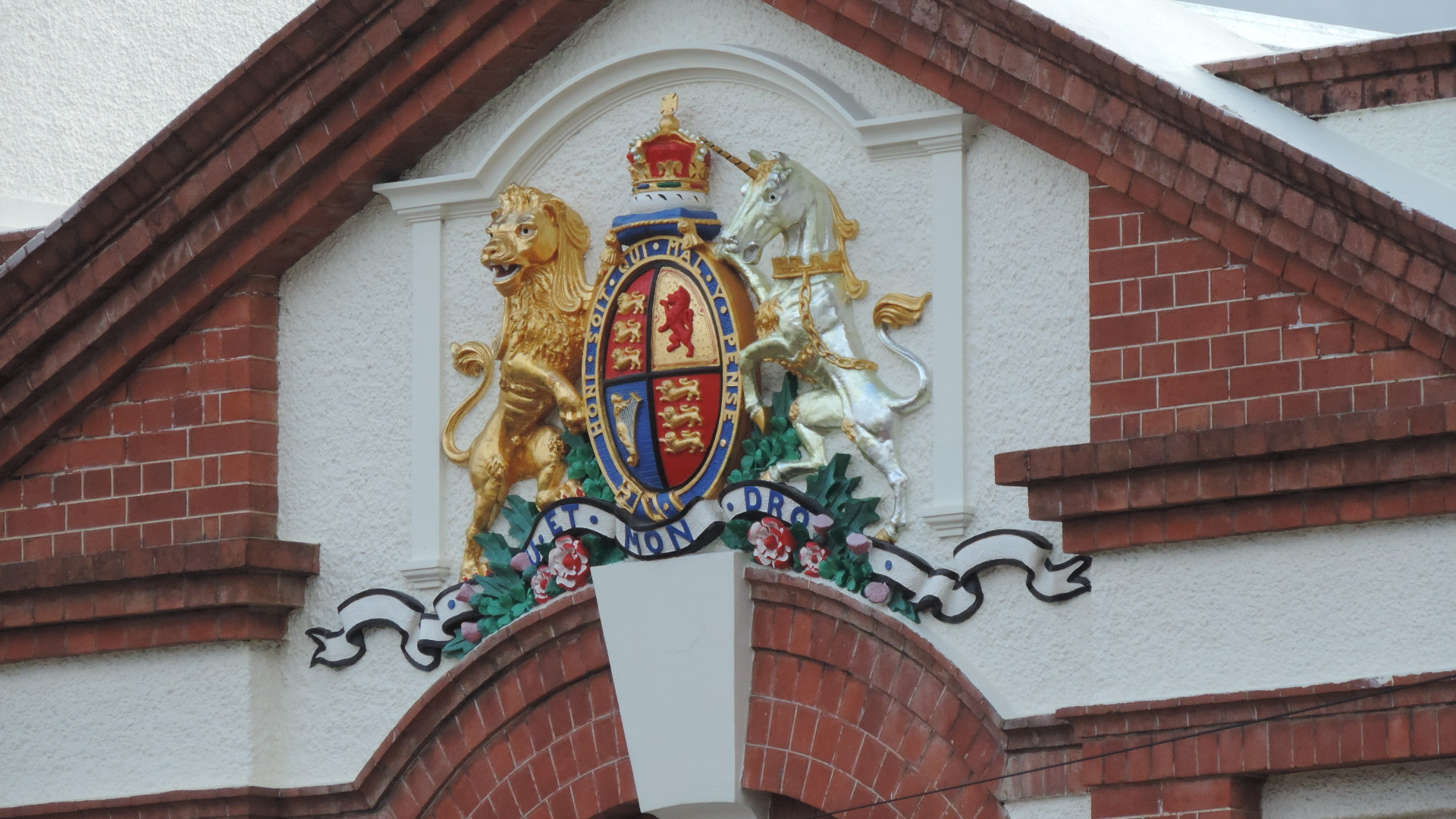
Coat of arms, Stanthorpe Post Office, 2015

The Post Office with a clock tower and an elaborate coat of arms was constructed in Maryland Street in 1901 in the Arts and Crafts style. Following Federation, the Commonwealth Government took charge of post and telegraphic services. However, they contracted the construction of post offices in Queensland to the Public Works Department of the Queensland Government and the Stanthorpe Post Office is believed to be one of the first ordered by the Commonwealth Government. It was designed by the first Commonwealth Government Architect John Smith Murdoch.

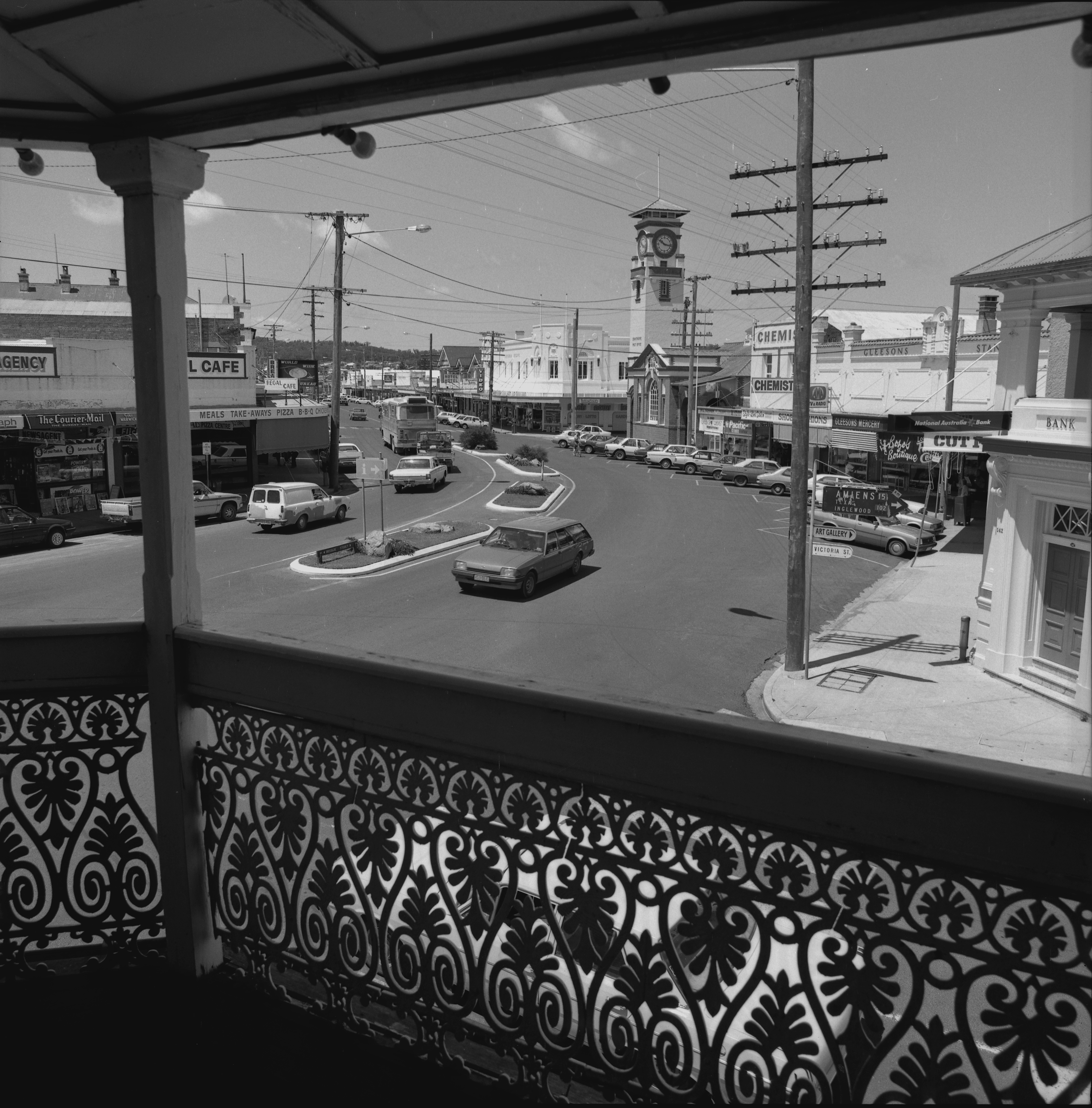
Maryland Street as seen from the Central Hotel, 1985

The cool dry climate was valued as an aid to health from the early nineteenth century especially for those suffering from tuberculosis or chest conditions. Following the First World War, Stanthorpe was a major resettlement area for soldiers recovering from mustard gas exposure. Many of these Soldier Settlers took up the land leased to them in the areas around Stanthorpe which now bear the names of First World War battlefields.

Stanthorpe State High School opened on 23 January 1961.

The Stanthorpe Regional Art Gallery was established in 1972.

Stanthorpe Adventist Primary School opened on 25 January 1982 and closed in 2002.

The Stanthorpe Library opened in 1987 with a major refurbishment in 2004.

The College of Wine Tourism was opened in 2007.

== Demographics ==
In the 2016 census, the locality of Stanthorpe had a population of 5,406 people.

In the 2021 census, the locality of Stanthorpe had a population of 5,286 people.

== Heritage listings ==
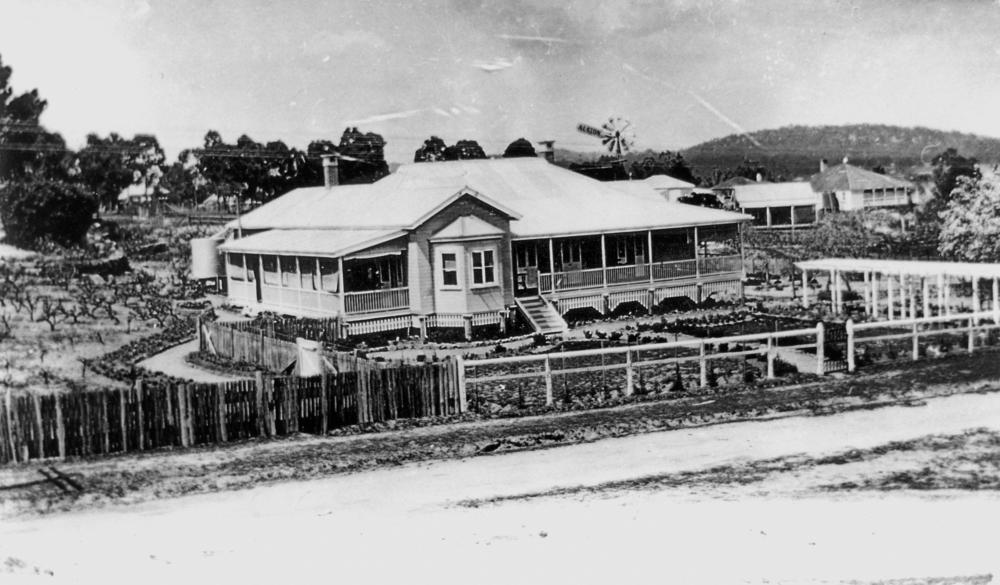
El Arish house and gardens

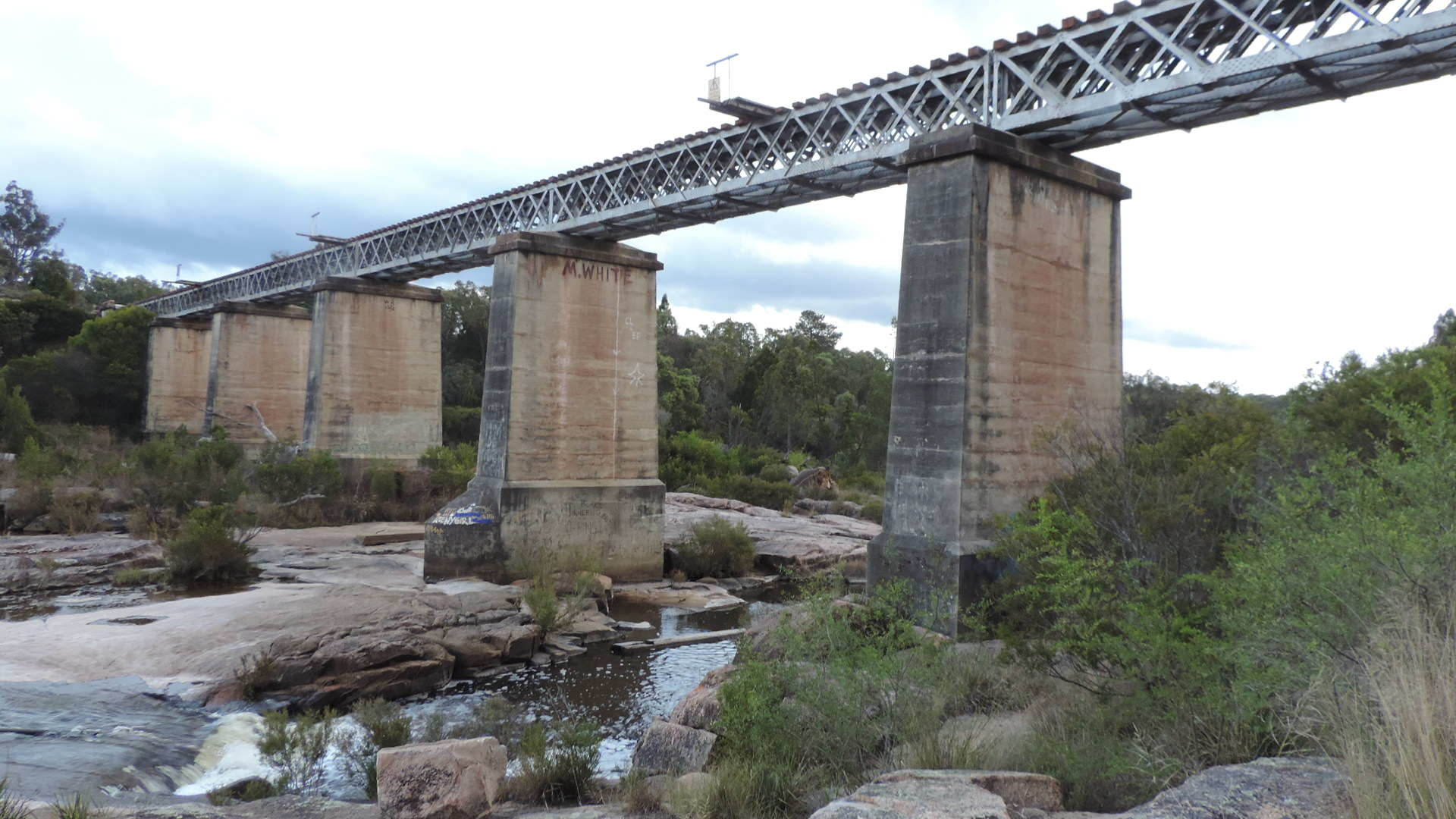
Quart Pot Creek Rail Bridge, 2015

Stanthorpe has a number of heritage-listed sites, including:

- El Arish, 94 Greenup Street
- Masel Residence, 98 High Street
- Central Hotel, 140 High Street
- Stanthorpe Post Office, 14 Maryland Street
- Stanthorpe Soldiers Memorial, Lock Street
- Quart Pot Creek Rail Bridge, Quart Pot Creek
- Cherry Gully Tunnel, Warwick-Stanthorpe railway line

== Education ==
Stanthorpe State School is a government primary (Early Childhood to Year 6) school for boys and girls at Marsh Street (28.6498°S 151.9343°E). In 2017, the school had an enrolment of 308 students with 33 teachers (27 full-time equivalent) and 22 non-teaching staff (13 full-time equivalent). It includes a special education program.

St Joseph's Catholic School is a private primary and secondary (Prep–12) school at 100 High Street (28.6528°S 151.9381°E).

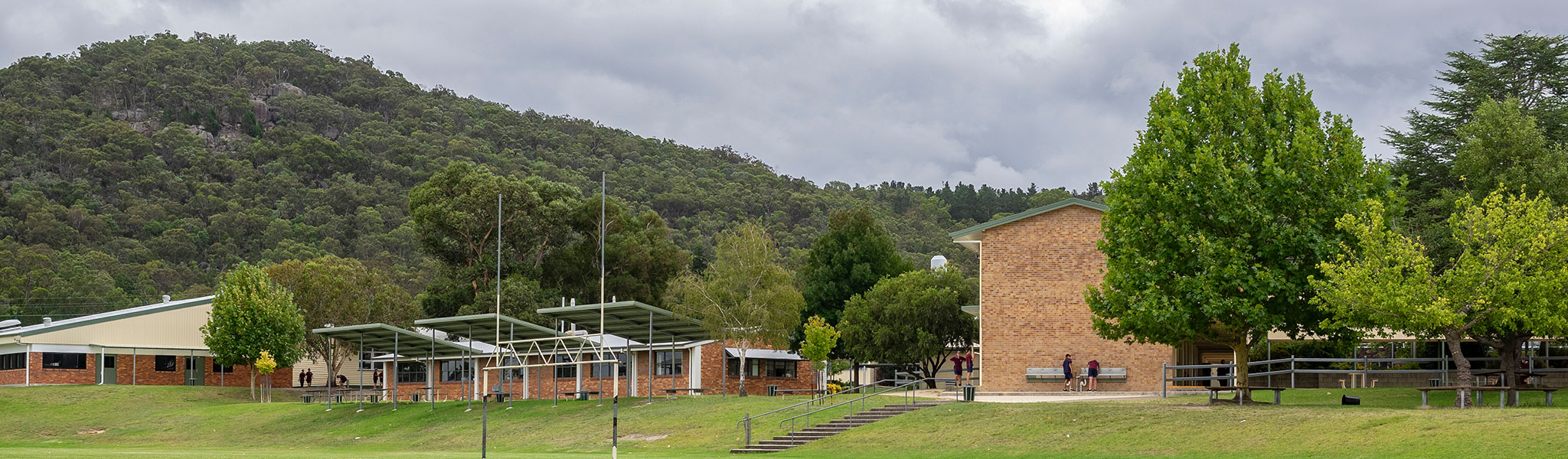
Stanthorpe State High School, 2023

Stanthorpe State High School is a government secondary (7–12) school for boys and girls at 2 McGlew Street (28.6456°S 151.9317°E). In 2017, the school had an enrolment of 653 students with 57 teachers (53 full-time equivalent) and 45 non-teaching staff (31 full-time equivalent). It includes a special education program.

Queensland College of Wine Tourism at 22 Caves Road (28.6419°S 151.9340°E) offers Bachelor level degrees. The college operates in co-operation with the local Stanthorpe State High School, as well as other regional schools to provide secondary, undergraduate, and graduate certification related to wine and tourism industries.

== Amenities ==
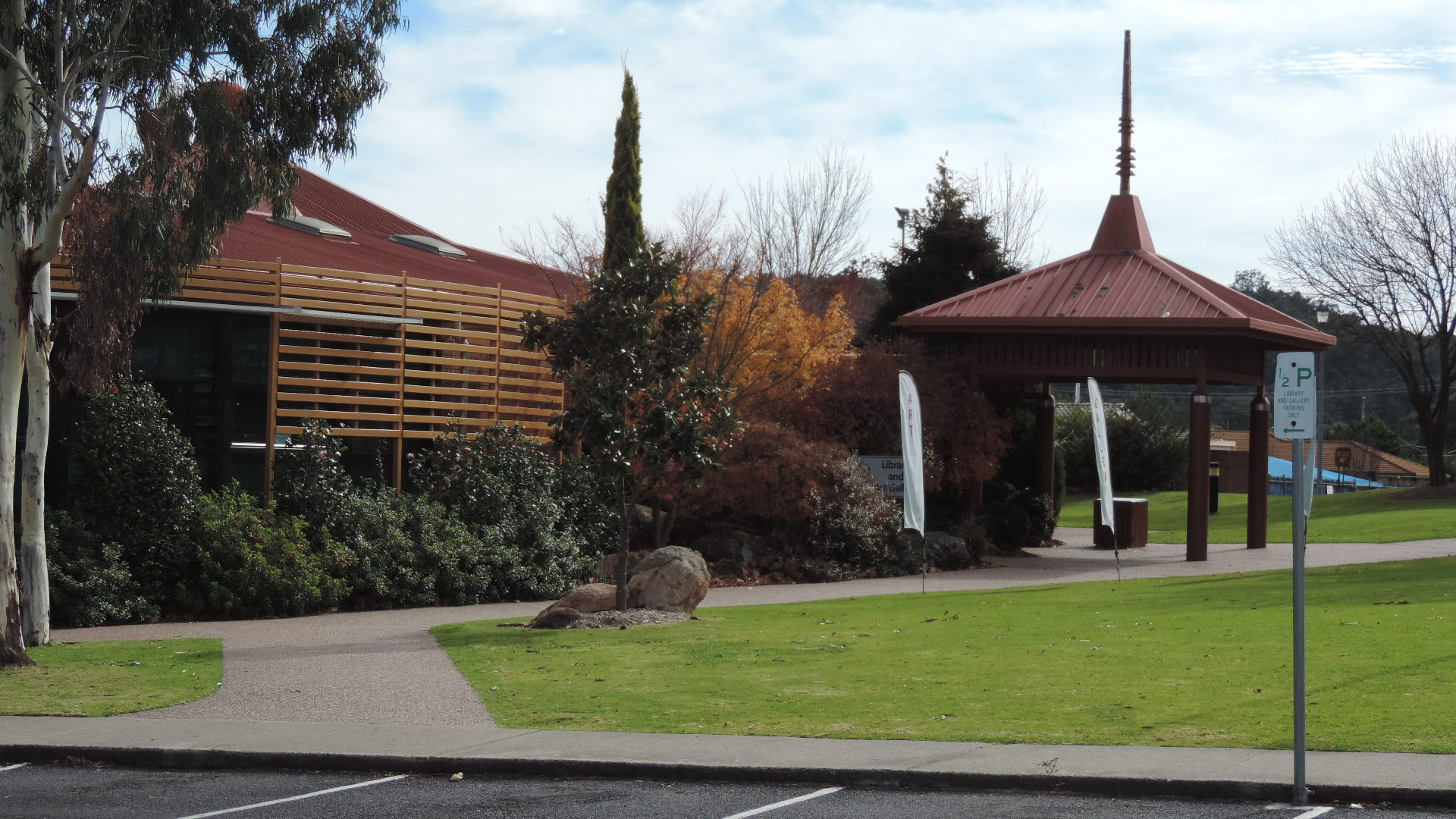
Stanthorpe library and art gallery, 2015, operated by the Southern Downs Regional Council

Stanthorpe Library and Regional Art Gallery building is located in Lock Street beside Weeroona Park (28.6537°S 151.9326°E). Both are provided by the Southern Downs Regional Council.

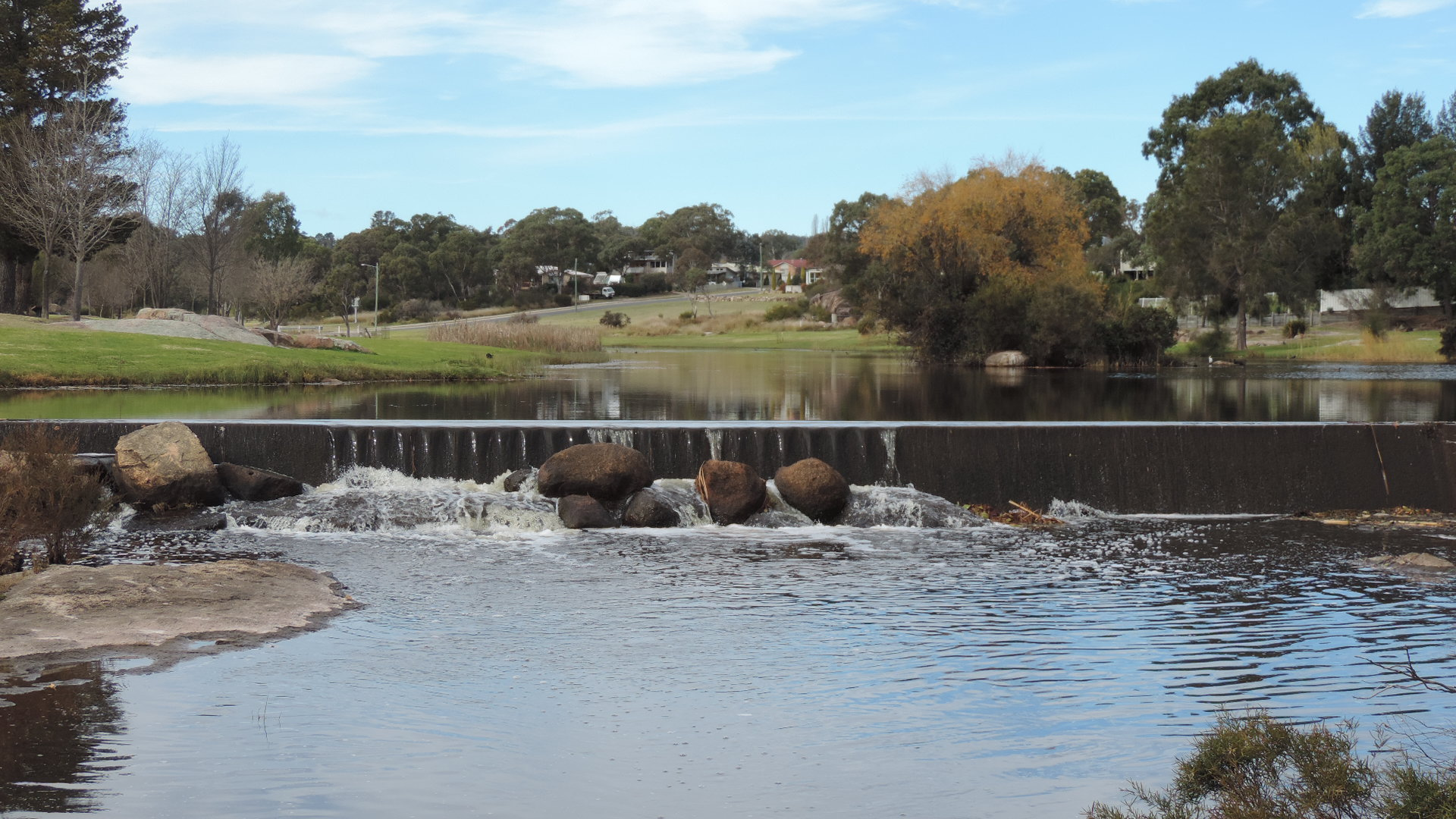
Park around Quart Pot Creek, 2015

The Stanthorpe Regional Art Gallery has a changing set of exhibitions. A number of internationally recognised Australian artists are represented in the collection, such as William Robinson, Jon Molvig, Margaret Olley and Charles Blackman. The biennial Stanthorpe Art Prize attracts entries from across Australia.

The Southern Downs Regional Council operates the Stanthorpe Civic Centre Complex and council offices in Marsh Street (28.6539°S 151.9339°E).

The Stanthorpe branch of the Queensland Country Women's Association has its rooms at 5 Victoria Street.

St Paul's Anglican Church is at 2 Corundum Street (28.6528°S 151.9376°E). It is part of the Stanthorpe Parish within the Anglican Diocese of Brisbane.

Parkland has been developed along both sides of Quart Pot Creek as it flows through Stanthorpe with a network of paths for walking and cycling with bridges and other crossings.

== Attractions ==
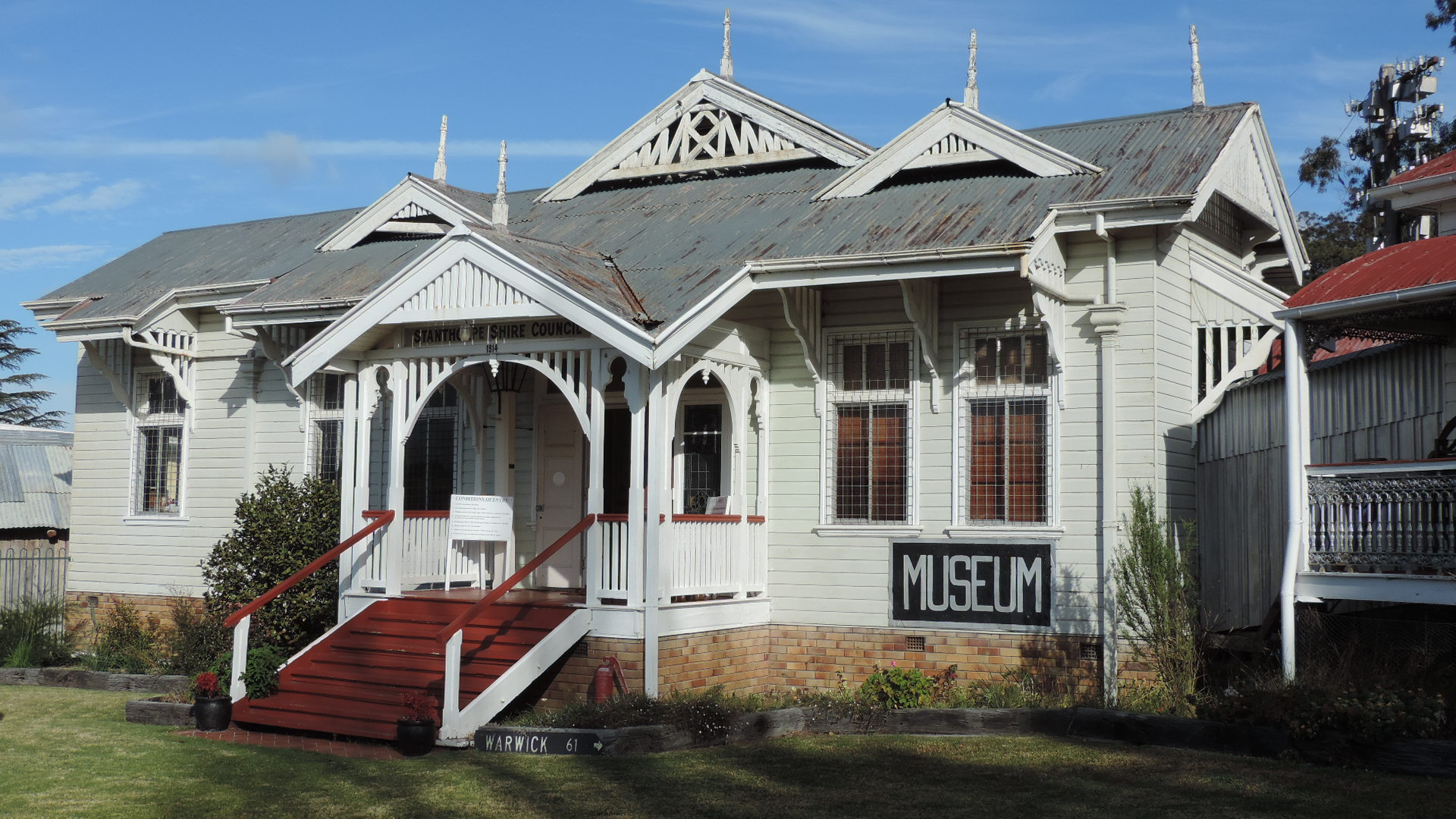
Old Stanthorpe Shire Council Chambers. Built in 1914, now part of the Stanthorpe Heritage Museum

The Stanthorpe Heritage Museum at 12 High Street has a number of heritage buildings relocated to the museum site and a large number of displayed items from the district's history, many unique to the Granite Belt. The relocated buildings include:

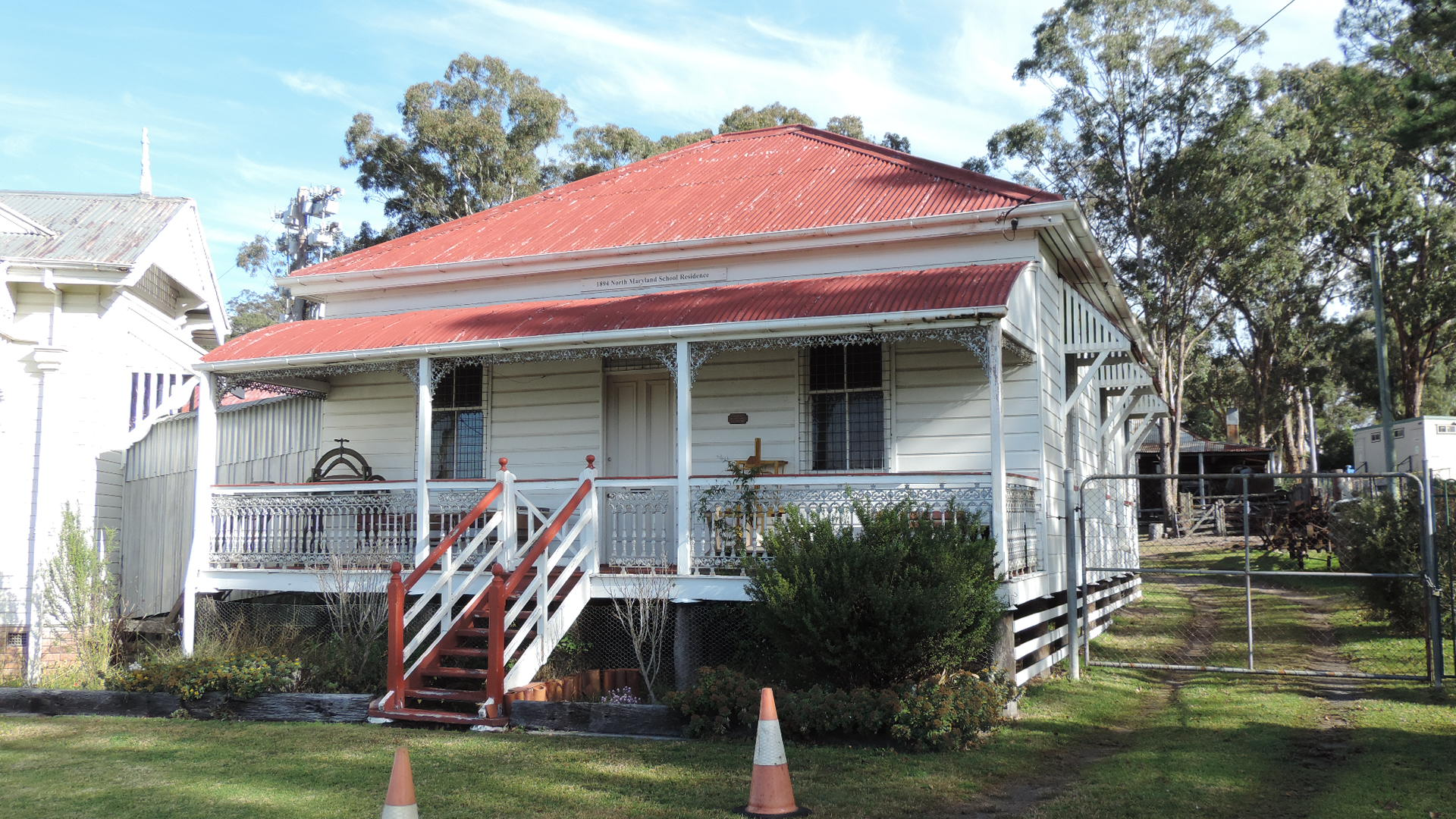
North Maryvale School Residence

- a shepherd's hut from the Ballandean Station (built 1876)
- the old gaol from Willsons Downfall (built 1876)
- the old North Maryland school residence (built 1894)
- the old Stanthorpe Shire Council Chambers (built in 1914)
- Ardmore House, a summer holiday house (built 1920)
- Heath House, a residence (built 1940)

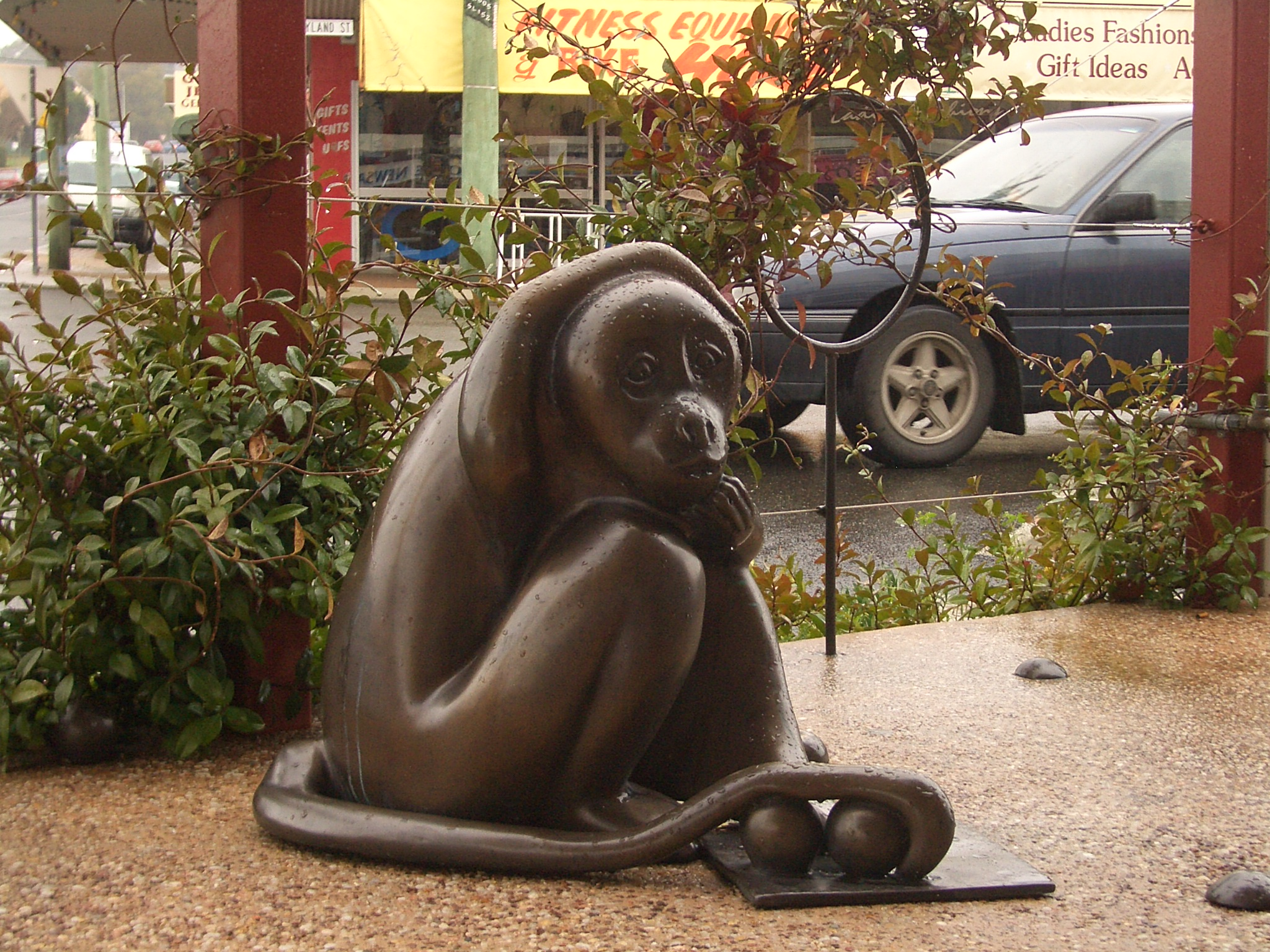
The Brass monkey at Stanthorpe's central Post Office Square

Several private art galleries operate in Stanthorpe including the Glen Aplin Art Gallery which supports emerging artists and musicians who wish to display new works and perform at public functions. There are many interesting works of street art on Stanthorpe streets.

== Events ==
There are many local events, including the annual Australian Small Winemakers Show, the biennial Apple & Grape Harvest Festival, Ballandean Estates' Opera in the Vineyard and the Stanthorpe Show.

== Transport ==
Stanthorpe is on the Southern railway line. Since 1972, there have been no scheduled passenger services operating to Stanthorpe railway station (28.6575°S 151.9375°E). Downs Explorer (formerly the Southern Downs Steam Railway) operates a tourist steam train most months from Warwick to Wallangarra and return, stopping in Stanthorpe.

Despite the name, the Stanthorpe Airport is on Scott Walker Drive in Applethorpe. It is a public airport operated by the Southern Downs Regional Council. There are no regular scheduled services to this airport.

== Media ==
Rebel FM 97.1 MHz was Stanthorpe's first commercial FM radio station. Rebel FM has a new & classic rock music format. The Breeze broadcasts on 90.1 MHz with an easy adult contemporary and classics hits format. Both stations are part of the Rebel Media group. Toowoomba based station CFM also broadcasts in Stanthorpe on 97.9 MHz. CFM is a part of the Australia wide Southern Cross Media network.

The Stanthorpe area is served by a local Community Radio Station Ten FM. The Station is currently transmitting on 98.7 MHz with a low power transmitter situated on Mount Marlay. The station has in 2011 upgraded its Stanthorpe studios with a new mixing desk, new computers and professional grade monitor speakers. Ten FM has a local focus, derived in part from the stringent rules controlling Community Radio Stations. The station transmits a broad range of programs to attract the widest audience. In particular, the station broadcasts Italoz, a weekly program with an Italian theme to cater for the many listeners around the Stanthorpe area with an Italian background.

The Stanthorpe Border Post is the only paid local newspaper servicing the district and is relied upon for its coverage of local news and events. Since 2020, it has been an online-only publication.

Stanthorpe is also serviced by a Christian radio network 3ABN Australia rebroadcasting on FM 88.0 MHz.

== Sporting ==
Stanthorpe has a popular European football culture and thus supports a relatively large number of teams in relation to its population size:

Club	A-Grade	Colts	Women's	Home Ground
Stanthorpe International Football Club	Yes	Yes	Yes	International Football Club
Stanthorpe United Redbacks Football Club	Yes	Yes	Yes	International Football Club
Stanthorpe Carlton United Football Club	Yes	Yes	Yes	C.F White Oval
Tenterfield Football Club	Yes	Yes	Yes	Rugby League Park
Ballandean Football Club	Yes	Yes	Yes	Ballandean Football Club
Stanthorpe City Football Club	Yes	Yes	Yes	C.F White Oval

Several of these teams share a home ground due to the small size of the town.

== Climate ==
Owing to its elevation, Stanthorpe features a subtropical highland climate (Cfb). At an altitude of 784 metres (2,572 ft), Stanthorpe holds the record for the lowest temperature recorded in Queensland at −10.6 °C (12.9 °F) on 23 June 1961.

Winters in Stanthorpe are cold. Sleet and light snowfalls are occasionally recorded, with the most significant snowfall in over 30 years occurring on 17 July 2015. Up to 8 centimetres (3 in) fell on Stanthorpe and nearby areas that day.

Climate data for Stanthorpe Leslie Parade (1991–2020 normals, extremes 1957–present); 784 metres or 2,572 feet AMSL; 28.66° S, 151.93° E
Month	Jan	Feb	Mar	Apr	May	Jun	Jul	Aug	Sep	Oct	Nov	Dec	Year
Record high °C (°F)	37.8 (100.0)	37.2 (99.0)	34.2 (93.6)	30.6 (87.1)	27.3 (81.1)	23.7 (74.7)	23.2 (73.8)	30.7 (87.3)	32.6 (90.7)	35.5 (95.9)	37.0 (98.6)	38.0 (100.4)	38.0 (100.4)
Mean maximum °C (°F)	33.9 (93.0)	33.3 (91.9)	30.6 (87.1)	27.3 (81.1)	23.6 (74.5)	20.5 (68.9)	20.4 (68.7)	23.1 (73.6)	27.1 (80.8)	30.1 (86.2)	32.5 (90.5)	33.5 (92.3)	35.4 (95.7)
Mean daily maximum °C (°F)	27.9 (82.2)	26.8 (80.2)	25.2 (77.4)	22.5 (72.5)	19.1 (66.4)	16.0 (60.8)	15.6 (60.1)	17.6 (63.7)	20.8 (69.4)	23.6 (74.5)	26.0 (78.8)	27.2 (81.0)	22.4 (72.3)
Daily mean °C (°F)	22.0 (71.6)	21.4 (70.5)	19.7 (67.5)	16.1 (61.0)	12.4 (54.3)	9.7 (49.5)	8.6 (47.5)	9.8 (49.6)	13.3 (55.9)	16.6 (61.9)	19.4 (66.9)	21.0 (69.8)	15.8 (60.5)
Mean daily minimum °C (°F)	16.1 (61.0)	15.9 (60.6)	14.1 (57.4)	9.7 (49.5)	5.6 (42.1)	3.3 (37.9)	1.6 (34.9)	2.0 (35.6)	5.8 (42.4)	9.5 (49.1)	12.7 (54.9)	14.7 (58.5)	9.3 (48.7)
Mean minimum °C (°F)	11.0 (51.8)	11.4 (52.5)	7.6 (45.7)	2.6 (36.7)	−2.3 (27.9)	−4.2 (24.4)	−4.9 (23.2)	−4.6 (23.7)	−1.2 (29.8)	2.3 (36.1)	5.7 (42.3)	8.4 (47.1)	−5.8 (21.6)
Record low °C (°F)	7.0 (44.6)	3.3 (37.9)	−0.2 (31.6)	−2.2 (28.0)	−6.9 (19.6)	−10.6 (12.9)	−9.4 (15.1)	−7.8 (18.0)	−5.6 (21.9)	−2.2 (28.0)	0.0 (32.0)	4.4 (39.9)	−10.6 (12.9)
Average rainfall mm (inches)	92.5 (3.64)	80.3 (3.16)	58.1 (2.29)	26.5 (1.04)	45.1 (1.78)	41.2 (1.62)	37.4 (1.47)	34.9 (1.37)	38.9 (1.53)	71.1 (2.80)	80.1 (3.15)	107.2 (4.22)	713.3 (28.07)
Average rainy days (≥ 1 mm)	7.8	7.6	6.4	3.8	5.2	5.8	4.9	4.1	5.1	7.5	7.8	8.5	74.5
Average dew point °C (°F)	14.5 (58.1)	15.2 (59.4)	12.5 (54.5)	8.9 (48.0)	7.0 (44.6)	5.4 (41.7)	3.6 (38.5)	2.1 (35.8)	4.2 (39.6)	7.7 (45.9)	10.9 (51.6)	12.5 (54.5)	8.7 (47.7)
Source: Bureau of Meteorology (dew point for 3pm)

== Notable people ==
- Ben Armbruster – Olympic Swimmer who has represented Australia in the Commonwealth Games and in the 2024 Paris Summer Olympics
- Jordan Atkins – rugby league player for the Gold Coast Titans and Parramatta Eels
- John Bathersby – former Roman Catholic Archbishop of Brisbane
- James Blundell – country music singer
- Ben Dark – television presenter, Getaway, Nine Network
- Jerome Davidi – Roman Catholic Priest considered to be influential in establishing the fruit industry in the Granite Belt in the 1870s and 1880s
- Jack Drake – bush poet
- Michael Hancock – former rugby league footballer for the Brisbane Broncos, Queensland and Australia
- Edith Elizabeth Harslett – (born 1888 in London, died 1945 in Stanthorpe). One of the few successful soldier settlers and very active in social affairs of the district
- Ann Leahy – politician
- Billy Moore – former rugby league footballer for the North Sydney Bears, Queensland and Australia
- John Reeves – politician and judge
- Greg Ritchie – Australian Test and one-day international cricketer
- Di Thorley – politician
- Bree Tomasel – TV personality and radio host

== International Relations ==
=== Twin towns – sister cities ===
Stanthorpe is twinned with the following places:

- Shiwa, Iwate Prefecture, Japan

== See also ==
- Wallangarra
- Warwick
- List of tramways in Queensland
