= Vinegar Hill, Queensland =

Vinegar Hill
- Suburb
- Interactive map of Vinegar Hill
- Coordinates: 27.4661°S 152.26°E
- Country: Australia
- State: Queensland
- LGA: Lockyer Valley Region
- Location: 8.8 km (5.5 mi) NNW of Gatton; 42.1 km (26.2 mi) ENE of Toowoomba CBD; 63.4 km (39.4 mi) W of Ipswich CBD; 101 km (63 mi) W of Brisbane

Government
  - State electorate: Lockyer
  - Federal division: Wright

Area
  - Total: 64.6 km^{2} (24.9 sq mi)

Population
  - Total: 57 (2021 census)
  - Density: 0.882/km^{2} (2.285/sq mi)
- Time zone: UTC+10:00 (AEST)
Suburbs around Vinegar Hill
Buaraba South	Buaraba South	Buaraba
Seventeen Mile	Vinegar Hill	Spring Creek
Ringwood	Ringwood	Adare

Vinegar Hill is a rural locality in the Lockyer Valley Region, Queensland, Australia. In the 2021 census, Vinegar Hill had a population of 57 people.

== Geography ==
The locality presumably takes its name from the hill Vinegar Hill in the south-west of the locality (27.4766°S 152.2376°E) which rises to 391 metres (1,283 ft) above sea level.

Most of the locality is within the Lockyer National Park which extends into neighbouring Seventeen Mile and Ringwood. There are two sections of the locality in the south and south-east not within the national park; the land use within these is predominantly grazing on native vegetation.

== Demographics ==
In the 2016 census, Vinegar Hill had a population of 57 people.

In the 2021 census, Vinegar Hill had a population of 57 people.

== Education ==
There are no schools in Vinegar Hill. The nearest government primary schools are Lake Claredon State School in Lake Claredon to the south-east, Gatton State School in Gatton to the south, and Helidon State School in Helidon to the south-west. The nearest government secondary school is Lockyer District State High School, also in Gatton.

== Vinegar Hill virus ==
The locality gives its name to the Vinegar Hill orthonairovirus, which is a tick-bourne. In 1981, the virus was isolated on the Australian mainland from a pool of five female Argasidae robertsi ticks collected from a rookery of the cattle egret (Bulbulcus ibis) in the Gatton area in December 1981.
