= Buaraba South, Queensland =

Buaraba South
- Suburb
- Interactive map of Buaraba South
- Coordinates: 27.4202°S 152.2427°E
- Country: Australia
- State: Queensland
- LGA: Lockyer Valley Region
- Location: 42.1 km (26.2 mi) N of Gatton; 45.3 km (28.1 mi) NE of Toowoomba; 83.3 km (51.8 mi) WNW of Ipswich; 132 km (82 mi) W of Brisbane

Government
  - State electorate: Lockyer
  - Federal division: Wright

Area
  - Total: 40.9 km^{2} (15.8 sq mi)

Population
  - Total: 0 (2021 census)
  - Density: 0.000/km^{2} (0.00/sq mi)
- Time zone: UTC+10:00 (AEST)
- Postcode: 4311
Suburbs around Buaraba South
| Palmtree | Buaraba | Buaraba |
| Seventeen Mile | Buaraba South | Buaraba |
| Seventeen Mile | Vinegar Hill | Vinegar Hill |

Buaraba South is a locality in the Lockyer Valley Region, Queensland, Australia. In the 2021 census, Buaraba South had "no people or a very low population".

== History ==
The district was named and bounded on 18 February 2000.

== Demographics ==
In the 2016 census, Buaraba South had "no people or a very low population".

In the 2021 census, Buaraba South had "no people or a very low population".

== Education ==
There are no schools in Buaraba South. The nearest government primary schools are in Murphys Creek, Lake Clarendon and Helidon. The nearest government secondary school is Lockyer District State High School in Gatton.
