= White Mountain, Queensland =

White Mountain
- Suburb
- Interactive map of White Mountain
- Coordinates: 27.4436°S 152.1188°E
- Country: Australia
- State: Queensland
- LGA: Lockyer Valley Region
- Location: 32.0 km (19.9 mi) E of Highfields; 30.8 km (19.1 mi) NE of Toowoomba CBD; 46.4 km (28.8 mi) NW of Gatton; 138 km (86 mi) W of Brisbane

Government
  - State electorate: Lockyer
  - Federal division: Wright

Area
  - Total: 40.7 km^{2} (15.7 sq mi)

Population
  - Total: 16 (2021 census)
  - Density: 0.393/km^{2} (1.02/sq mi)
- Time zone: UTC+10:00 (AEST)
- Postcode: 4352
Suburbs around White Mountain
Fifteen Mile	Hampton	Palmtree
Murphys Creek	White Mountain	Seventeen Mile
Upper Lockyer	Helidon	Seventeen Mile

White Mountain is a rural locality in the Lockyer Valley Region, Queensland, Australia. In the 2021 census, White Mountain had a population of 16 people.

== Geography ==
The terrain is mountainous, ranging from 200 to 570 metres (660 to 1,870 ft) above sea level with White Mountain (27.4283°S 152.1054°E) being the only named peak at 527 metres (1,729 ft).

Most of the centre, south, and east of the locality forms part of the Lockyer National Park. Apart from this protected area, there is little land use of the remaining mountainous terrain, apart from small areas of grazing on native vegetation in the north of the locality.

== History ==
The locality was named and bounded on 18 February 2000. It presumably takes its name from the mountain.

== Demographics ==
In the 2016 census, White Mountain had a population of 21 people.

In the 2021 census, White Mountain had a population of 16 people.

== Education ==
There are no schools in White Mountain. The nearest government primary school is Murphy's Creek State School in neighbouring Murphys Creek to the west. The nearest government secondary school is Highfields State Secondary College in Highfields to west.

== Attractions ==
Red Cliffs is a sandstone cliff with a number of rockclimbing routes (27.46181°S 152.09953°E).
