= Seventeen Mile, Queensland =

Seventeen Mile
- Suburb
- Interactive map of Seventeen Mile
- Coordinates: 27.4580°S 152.1708°E
- Country: Australia
- State: Queensland
- LGA: Lockyer Valley Region
- Location: 32.3 km (20.1 mi) NW of Gatton; 34.9 km (21.7 mi) NE of Toowoomba; 122 km (76 mi) W of Brisbane

Government
  - State electorate: Lockyer
  - Federal division: Wright

Area
  - Total: 54.3 km^{2} (21.0 sq mi)

Population
  - Total: 22 (2021 census)
  - Density: 0.405/km^{2} (1.049/sq mi)
- Time zone: UTC+10:00 (AEST)
- Postcode: 4344
Suburbs around Seventeen Mile
Palmtree	Palmtree	Buaraba South
White Mountain	Seventeen Mile	Vinegar Hill
Helidon	Grantham	Ringwood

Seventeen Mile is a rural locality in the Lockyer Valley Region, Queensland, Australia. In the 2021 census, Seventeen Mile had a population of 22 people.

== Geography ==
The terrain is mountainous, ranging from 190 to 627 metres (623 to 2,057 ft), with the highest peak being Mount Cross (27.4434°S 152.1682°E) in the north-west of the locality at 627 metres (2,057 ft).

Alice Creek rises in the north of the locality and flows south-west, exiting the locality to the south-west (White Mountain / Helidon). It is a tributary of Lockyer Creek and then of the Brisbane River which flows into Moreton Bay.

Most of the south-east of the locality is within the Lockyer National Park. Apart from this protected area, the predominant land use is grazing on native vegetation.

== History ==
The locality was officially named and bounded on 18 February 2000.

== Demographics ==
In the 2016 census, Seventeen Mile had a population of 16 people.

In the 2021 census, Seventeen Mile had a population of 22 people.

== Education ==
There are no schools in Seventeen Mile. The nearest government primary schools are Helidon State School in neighbouring Helidon to the south-west and Murphy's Creek State School in Murphys Creek to the west. The nearest government secondary school is Lockyer District State High School in Gatton to the south-east.
