= Carpendale, Queensland =

Carpendale
- Suburb
- Interactive map of Carpendale
- Coordinates: 27.5863°S 152.1513°E
- Country: Australia
- State: Queensland
- LGA: Lockyer Valley Region
- Location: 18.1 km (11.2 mi) WSW of Gatton; 25.4 km (15.8 mi) E of Toowoomba; 75.1 km (46.7 mi) W of Ipswich; 113 km (70 mi) W of Brisbane

Government
  - State electorate: Lockyer
  - Federal division: Wright

Area
  - Total: 10.5 km^{2} (4.1 sq mi)

Population
  - Total: 110 (2021 census)
  - Density: 10.5/km^{2} (27.1/sq mi)
- Time zone: UTC+10:00 (AEST)
- Postcode: 4344
Suburbs around Carpendale
Iredale	Helidon	Grantham
Iredale	Carpendale	Veradilla
Lilydale	Lilydale	Veradilla

Carpendale is a rural locality in the Lockyer Valley Region, Queensland, Australia. In the 2021 census, Carpendale had a population of 110 people.

== Geography ==
Lockyer Creek forms the northern boundary.

== History ==
Carpendale State School opened on 23 June 1924 and closed on 10 December 1982. It was at 10 Gormans Road (27.5885°S 152.1587°E).

== Demographics ==
In the 2016 census, Carpendale had a population of 134 people.

In the 2021 census, Carpendale had a population of 110 people.

== Education ==
There are no schools in Carpendale. The nearest government primary schools are Helidon State School in neighbouring Helidon to the north-west, Grantham State School in neighbouring Grantham to the north-east, and Flagstone Creek State School in Flagstone Creek to the south-west. The nearest government secondary schools is Lockyer District State High School in Gatton to the east.

== See also ==
- List of schools in West Moreton
