= Ma Ma Creek, Queensland =

Ma Ma Creek
- Town
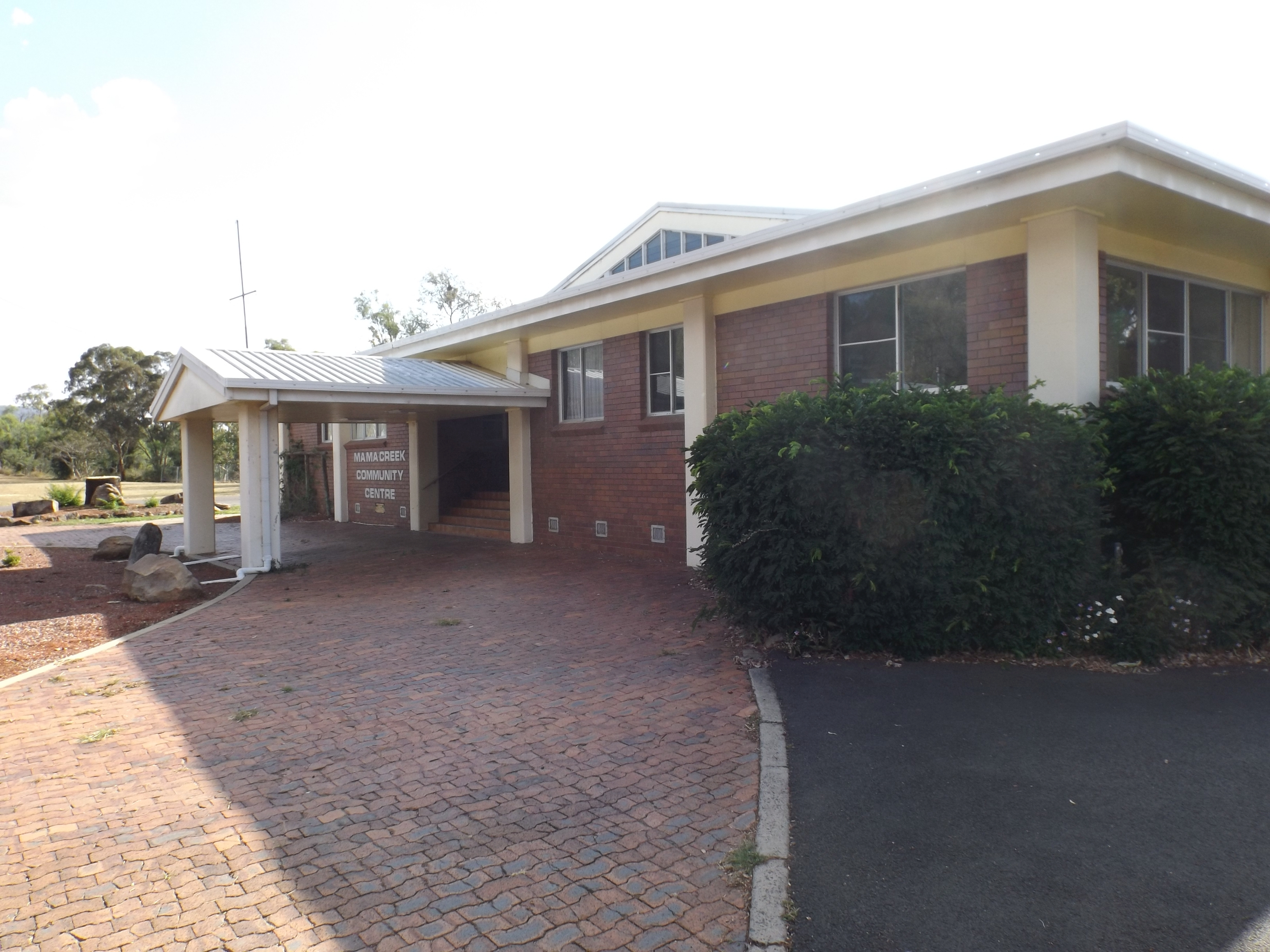
- Ma Ma Creek Community Centre, 2014

- Interactive map of Ma Ma Creek
- Coordinates: 27.6295°S 152.1891°E
- Country: Australia
- State: Queensland
- LGA: Lockyer Valley Region
- Location: 14.1 km (8.8 mi) SW of Gatton; 39.2 km (24.4 mi) ESE of Toowoomba; 68.2 km (42.4 mi) W of Ipswich; 103 km (64 mi) WSW of Brisbane

Government
  - State electorate: Lockyer
  - Federal division: Wright

Area
  - Total: 23.5 km^{2} (9.1 sq mi)

Population
  - Total: 155 (2021 census)
  - Density: 6.60/km^{2} (17.08/sq mi)
- Time zone: UTC+10:00 (AEST)
- Postcode: 4347
Localities around Ma Ma Creek
Lilydale	Veradilla; Winwill	Lower Tenthill
Flagstone Creek	Ma Ma Creek	Upper Tenthill
Flagstone Creek	Mount Whitestone	Upper Tenthill

Ma Ma Creek is a rural town and locality in the Lockyer Valley Region, Queensland, Australia. In the 2021 census, the locality of Ma Ma Creek had a population of 155 people.

== Geography ==
Although there are some houses within the town, most of the population is living in rural residential blocks along the Gatton Clifton Road. Irrigated cropping also occurs along the road route with the remainder of the locality being used for grazing on natural vegetation. Ma Ma Creek (the watercourse) flows through from south to north.

== Road infrastructure ==
The Gatton–Clifton Road (State Route 80) runs through from north-east to south.

== History ==
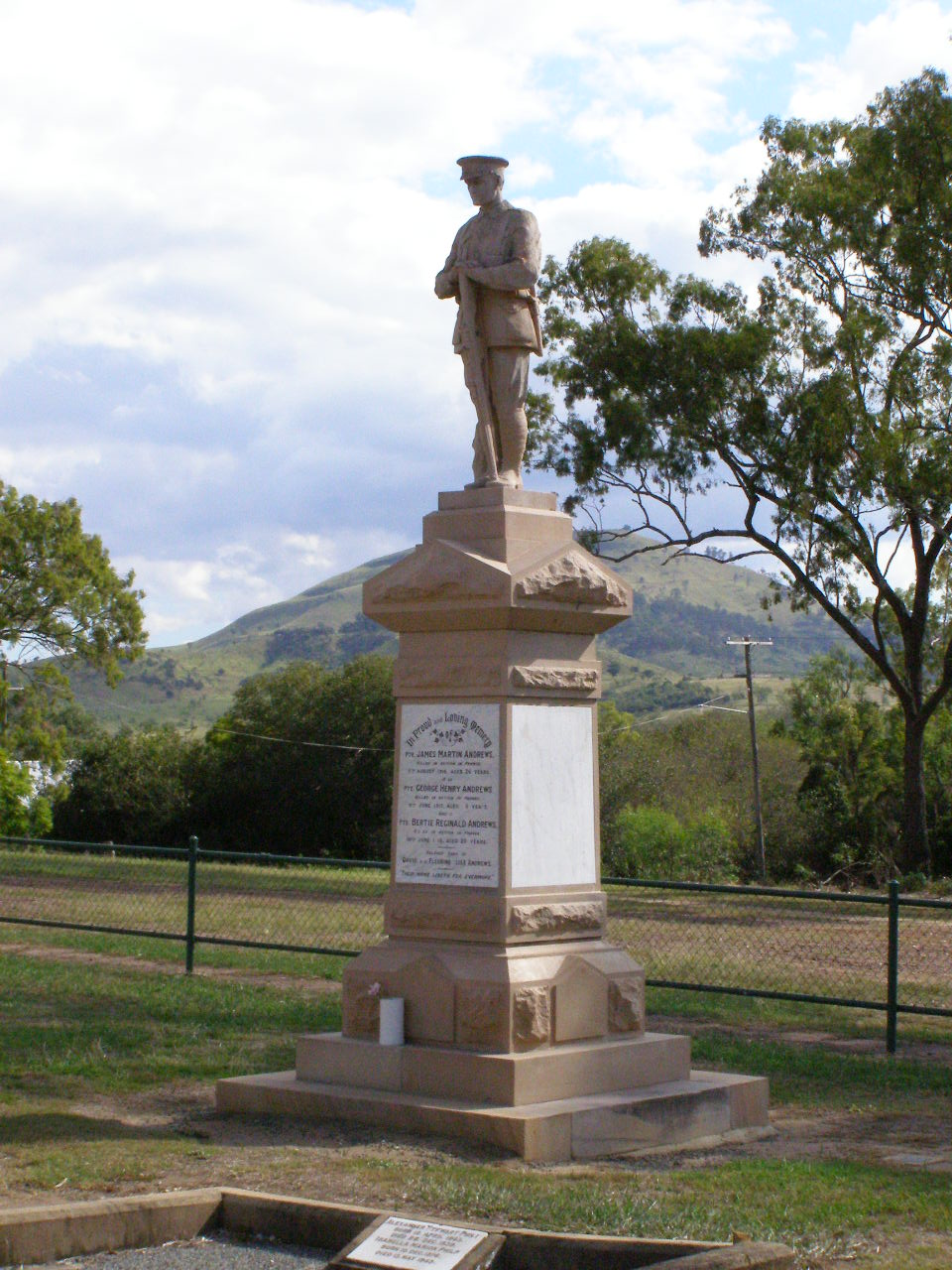
Ma Ma Creek War Memorial, 2006

The town takes its name from the creek, which is a tributary of the Lockyer Creek and ultimately contributes into the Brisbane River which flows into Moreton Bay. The name Ma Ma is allegedly derived from the Aboriginal mia mia meaning bark huts. However, mia mia is an Aboriginal term from Western Australia, suggesting that Ma Ma was named by European settlers.

Ma Ma Creek Post Office opened on 1 May 1884 (a receiving office had been open from 1881).

The Ma Ma Creek War Memorial commemorates three brothers: James, George and Bertie Andrews who were all killed in action in World War I. The memorial was erected in 1920 by their mother Fleurine Elsie Andrews. Although a private monument, it is used by the wider community for ANZAC Day ceremonies.

Ma Ma Creek Provisional School opened on 27 October 1880. On 21 January 1889 it became Ma Ma State School. In 1916, the school building was relocated to a new site.

== Demographics ==
In the 2011 census, the locality of Ma Ma Creek and surrounding districts had a population of 403 people.

In the 2016 census, the locality of Ma Ma Creek had a population of 149 people.

In the 2021 census, the locality of Ma Ma Creek had a population of 155 people.

== Heritage listings ==
Ma Ma Creek has a number of heritage-listed sites, including:

- Ma Ma Creek War Memorial, Gatton-Clifton Road

== Education ==
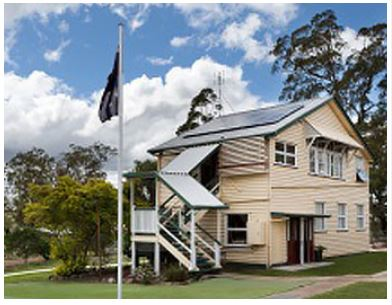
Ma Ma Creek State School, 2023

Ma Ma Creek State School is a government primary (Prep-6) school for boys and girls at 803 Gatton-Clifton Road (27.6288°S 152.1900°E). In 2017, the school had an enrolment of 16 students with 3 teachers (2 full-time equivalent) and 4 non-teaching staff (2 full-time equivalent).

There is no secondary school in Ma Ma Creek. The nearest government secondary school is the Lockyer District State High School in Gatton.

== Amenities ==
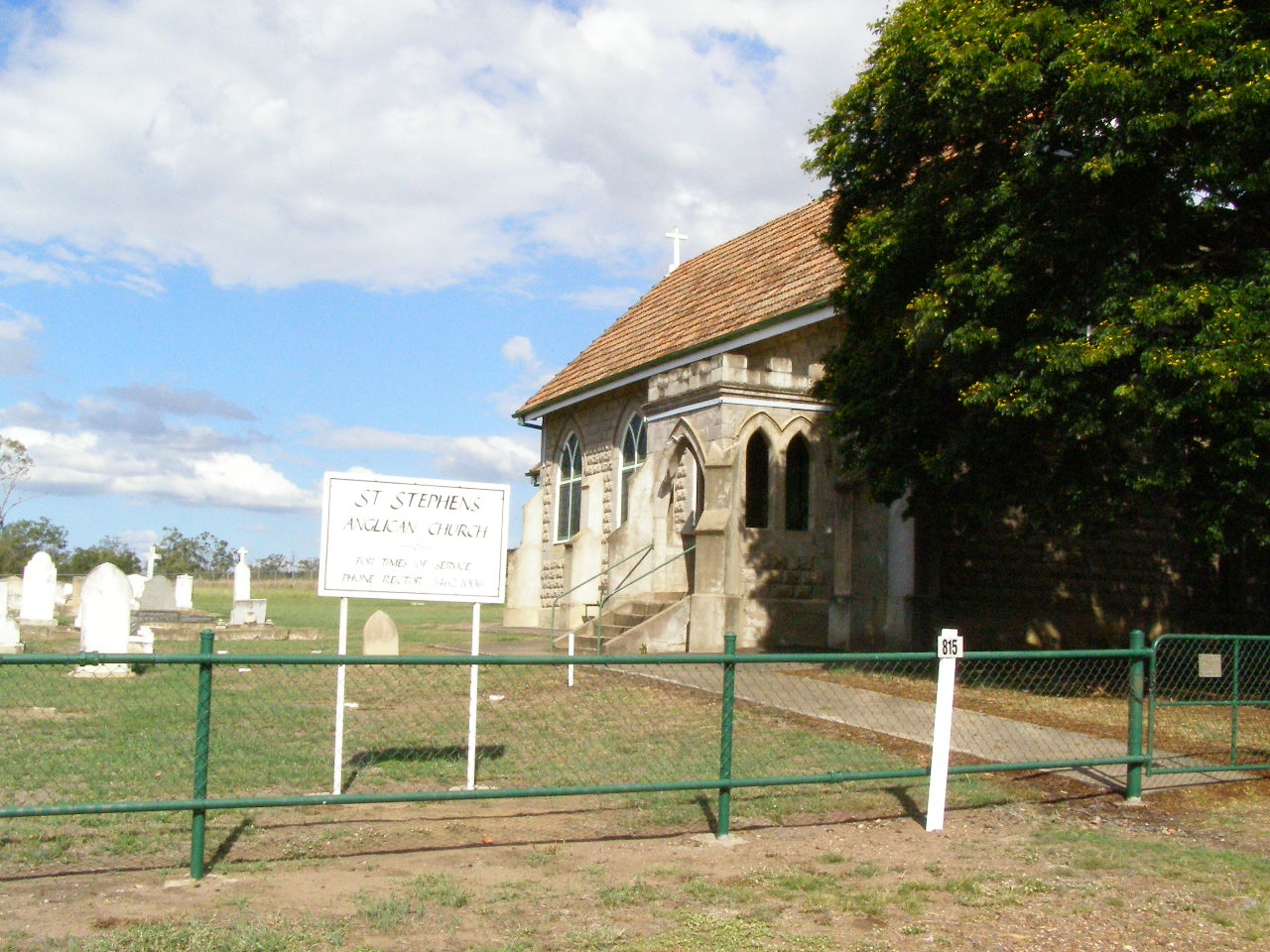
St Stephen's Anglican church and cemetery, 2006

The town has a community centre and general store. There are two churches, St Stephens Anglican church and a Church of Christ. St Stephens Anglican church has an associated cemetery.

== See also ==
- List of reduplicated Australian place names
