= Veradilla, Queensland =

Veradilla
- Suburb
- Interactive map of Veradilla
- Coordinates: 27.5972°S 152.1833°E
- Country: Australia
- State: Queensland
- LGA: Lockyer Valley Region
- Location: 12.7 km (7.9 mi) SW of Gatton; 29.4 km (18.3 mi) E of Toowoomba; 66.8 km (41.5 mi) W of Ipswich; 104 km (65 mi) W of Brisbane

Government
  - State electorate: Lockyer
  - Federal division: Wright

Area
  - Total: 11.1 km^{2} (4.3 sq mi)

Population
  - Total: 125 (2021 census)
  - Density: 11.26/km^{2} (29.17/sq mi)
- Time zone: UTC+10:00 (AEST)
- Postcode: 4347
Suburbs around Veradilla
Carpendale	Grantham	Grantham
Carpendale	Veradilla	Winwill
Lilydale	Ma Ma Creek	Ma Ma Creek

Veradilla is a rural locality in the Lockyer Valley Region, Queensland, Australia. In the 2021 census, Veradilla had a population of 125 people.

== Geography ==
Lockyer Creek forms the northern boundary of the locality.

The Gatton Clifton Road (State Route 80) passes to the east.

The terrain ranges from 110 to 307 metres (361 to 1,007 ft) above sea level. Most of the higher elevations are in the south-west corner of the locality around Evans Hill (27.6058°S 152.1659°E) which is the highest point of the locality at 307 metres (1,007 ft).

Despite the name, Carpendale Airstrip is in the north-west of the locality (27.5881°S 152.1705°E).

There is some rural residential housing in the north-east of the locality, but the predominant land use is grazing on native vegetation.

== History ==
In August 1895, tenders were called for the erection of a provisional school at Grantham Scrub. In January 1896, teacher Catherine M. Ludeman was appointed to the Grantham Scrub Provisional School, suggesting it opened around that time. On 1 January 1909, it became Grantham Scrub State School. It closed c. 1950. It was located at 119 Missouri Road (corner of Grantham Scrub Road, 27.59327°S 152.18507°E) within the present-day locality of neighbouring Veradilla.

== Demographics ==
In the 2016 census, Veradilla had a population of 101 people.

In the 2021 census, Veradilla had a population of 125 people.

== Economy ==
There is an abattoir in the north-west of the locality operated by Stanbroke, a beef production company that raises cattle in a number of parts of Queensland and exports beef products to 35 countries.

== Education ==
There are no schools in Veradilla. The nearest government primary schools are Grantham State School in neighbouring Grantham to the north and Ma Ma Creek State School in neighbouring Ma Ma Creek to the south. The nearest government secondary school is Lockyer District State High School in Gatton to the north-east.
