= Adare, Queensland =

Adare
- Suburb
- Interactive map of Adare
- Coordinates: 27.5097°S 152.2961°E
- Country: Australia
- State: Queensland
- LGA: Lockyer Valley Region
- Location: 11.7 km (7.3 mi) NE of Gatton; 46.5 km (28.9 mi) E of Toowoomba; 65.9 km (40.9 mi) NW of Ipswich; 90.6 km (56.3 mi) W of Brisbane CBD

Government
  - State electorate: Lockyer
  - Federal division: Wright

Area
  - Total: 39.2 km^{2} (15.1 sq mi)

Population
  - Total: 1,027 (2021 census)
  - Density: 26.20/km^{2} (67.86/sq mi)
- Time zone: UTC+10:00 (AEST)
- Postcode: 4343
Suburbs around Adare
Vinegar Hill	Vinegar Hill	Spring Creek
Ringwood	Adare	Lake Clarendon
Gatton	Gatton	Gatton

Adare is a rural locality in the Lockyer Valley Region, Queensland, Australia. In the 2021 census, Adare had a population of 1,027 people.

== Geography ==
The Warrego Highway forms most of the locality's southern boundary, with the Gatton-Esk Road forms most of its eastern boundary; the Lockyer Creek forms the south-eastern boundary.

Adare is predominantly freeland farming land, a mix of crops and grazing; the land ranges from 100 to 150 metres (330 to 490 ft) above sea level. In the northern tip of the locality is an unnamed peak of 250 metres which is a small part of the Lockyer National Park which is predominantly located in the adjacent locality of Vinegar Hill. Redbank Creek rises in Vinegar Hill and flows from the north to the south-east through Adare, entering Lockyer Creek immediately before Jordan Weir.

Holcomb is a neighbourhood in the centre of the locality near the crossing of Adare Road over Redbank Creek (27.5166°S 152.2833°E).

== History ==
The locality is named after one of the Lockyer Valley's largest cattle properties of the 19th and 20th centuries, with the homestead approximately seven kilometres north of Gatton on Adare Road. This original homestead was moved from a site on the edge of Lake Clarendon in 1896 by William Drayton Armstrong, member of the Queensland Legislative Assembly and the Speaker from 1911 to 1915.

Clarendon Provisional School opened circa 1882. In 1903, it was renamed Springdale Provisional School. It became Springdale State School on 1 January 1909, but closed later in 1909. Its precise location is not known but it was in the vicinity of the intersection of (present day) Adare, Lake Clarendon and Spring Creek.

== Demographics ==
In the 2016 census, Adare had a population of 873 people.

In the 2021 census, Adare had a population of 1,027 people.

== Education ==
There are no schools in Adare; the nearest government primary schools are Gatton State School in neighbouring Gatton to the south, and Lake Clarendon State School in neighbouring Lake Clarendon to the east. The nearest government secondary school is Lockyer District State High School in Gatton.

== Notable residents ==
- William Drayton Armstrong, Member of the Queensland Legislative Assembly
- William Vanneck, 5th Baron Huntingfield, Governor of Victoria (nephew of William Drayton Armstrong)
