= Winwill, Queensland =

Winwill
- Suburb
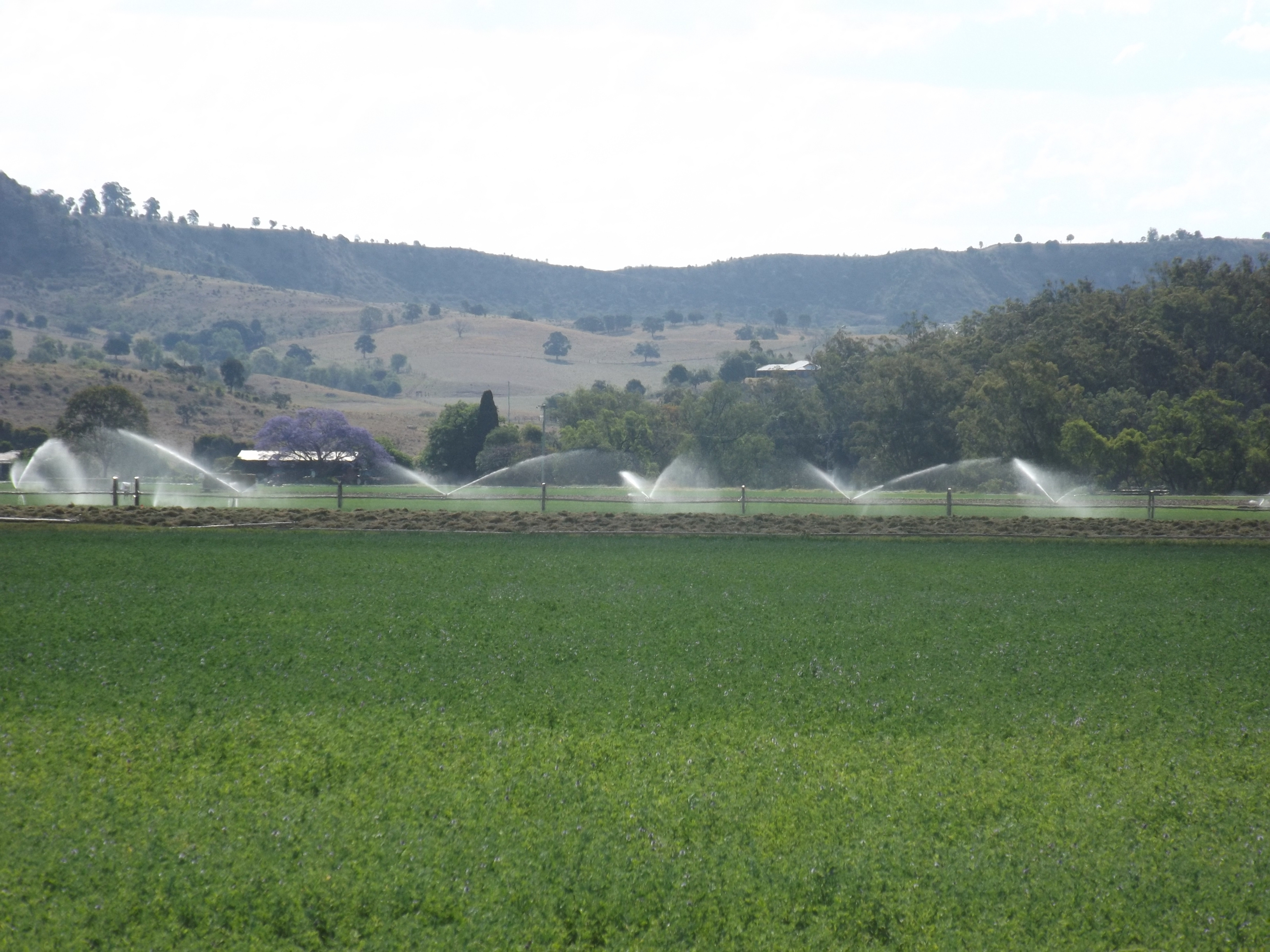
- Irrigated crops, 2014

- Interactive map of Winwill
- Coordinates: 27.6061°S 152.2091°E
- Country: Australia
- State: Queensland
- LGA: Lockyer Valley Region
- Location: 10.3 km (6.4 mi) SW of Gatton; 31.4 km (19.5 mi) ESE of Toowoomba; 102 km (63 mi) WSW of Brisbane

Government
  - State electorate: Lockyer
  - Federal division: Wright

Area
  - Total: 6.1 km^{2} (2.4 sq mi)

Population
  - Total: 144 (2021 census)
  - Density: 23.61/km^{2} (61.1/sq mi)
- Time zone: UTC+10:00 (AEST)
- Postcode: 4347
Suburbs around Winwill
Grantham	Lower Tenthill	Lower Tenthill
Veradilla	Winwill	Lower Tenthill
Ma Ma Creek	Upper Tenthill	Lower Tenthill

Winwill is a rural locality in the Lockyer Valley Region, Queensland, Australia. In the 2021 census, Winwill had a population of 144 people.

== Geography ==
The eastern boundary of Winwill follows Tenthill Creek and Ma Ma Creek marks a small section of the western boundary. The Gatton–Clifton Road (State Route 80) passes through from north-east to south. The north and west of the locality is mostly rural residential while the eastern and southern parts of the locality are used for irrigated cropping.

== Demographics ==
At the 2011 census, the population of Winwill was not separately recorded but included within the population of 403 at Ma Ma Creek.

In the 2016 census, Winwill had a population of 149 people.

In the 2021 census, Winwill had a population of 144 people.

== Education ==
There are no schools in Winwill. The nearest government primary schools are Grantham State School in neighbouring Grantham, Tent Hill Lower State School in Lower Tenthill, and Ma Ma Creek State School in Ma Ma Creek. The nearest government secondary school is Lockyer District State High School in Gatton.
