= Iredale, Queensland =

Iredale
- Suburb
- Interactive map of Iredale
- Coordinates: 27.5794°S 152.1063°E
- Country: Australia
- State: Queensland
- LGA: Lockyer Valley Region
- Location: 3.6 km (2.2 mi) S of Helidon; 19.8 km (12.3 mi) W of Gatton; 21.5 km (13.4 mi) E of Toowoomba CBD; 110 km (68 mi) W of Brisbane

Government
  - State electorate: Lockyer
  - Federal division: Wright

Area
  - Total: 23.6 km^{2} (9.1 sq mi)

Population
  - Total: 177 (2021 census)
  - Density: 7.50/km^{2} (19.42/sq mi)
- Time zone: UTC+10:00 (AEST)
- Postcode: 4344
Suburbs around Iredale
Helidon Spa	Helidon Spa	Helidon
Derrymore	Iredale	Carpendale
Flagstone Creek	Flagstone Creek	Lilydale

Iredale is a rural locality in the Lockyer Valley Region, Queensland, Australia. In the 2021 census, Iredale had a population of 177 people.

== Geography ==
Lockyer Creek forms the north-eastern boundary. Monkey Water Holes Creek forms the northern boundary before joining the Lockyer. Soda Spring Creek rises in the south and flows through to join the Lockyer in the north-east.

The Warrego Highway passes to the north of the locality.

The land use is predominantly grazing on native vegetation with some crop growing and rural residential housing.

== History ==
Helidon Scrub Provisional School opened on 6 June 1894 in a one-roomed building with two windows, a door and a front verandah. On the first day, there were 23 students under teacher Miss Mary Frawley. On 1 January 1909, it became Helidon Scrub State School. As there was no space for a playground, in 1914 it was proposed that the school be relocated to a new site. On 6 March 1916, a new school building was built on a new site with the old school building to be the Iredale School of Arts. Eight of the original students attended the school's 50th anniversary in June 1944. Circa 1944, it was renamed Iredale State School (a name had been used informally for many years). It closed in 1975. The original school site was on 586 Spa Water Road (27.57216°S 152.08628°E) and the 1916 school site was at 646 Spa Water Road (27.5737°S 152.0910°E).

== Demographics ==
In the 2016 census, Iredale had a population of 158 people.

In the 2021 census, Iredale had a population of 177 people.

== Education ==
There are no schools in Iredale. The nearest government primary schools are Helidon State School in neighbouring Helidon to the north-east, Flagstone Creek State School in neighbouring Flagstone Creek to the south and Withcott State School in Withcott to the west. The nearest government secondary schools are Lockyer District State High School in Gatton to the east and Centenary Heights State High School in Centenary Heights in Toowoomba to the west.
