= Lilydale, Queensland =

Lilydale
- Suburb
- Interactive map of Lilydale
- Coordinates: 27.6077°S 152.1405°E
- Country: Australia
- State: Queensland
- LGA: Lockyer Valley Region
- Location: 20.3 km (12.6 mi) WSW of Gatton; 26.9 km (16.7 mi) E of Toowoomba CBD; 114 km (71 mi) W of Brisbane

Government
  - State electorate: Lockyer
  - Federal division: Wright

Area
  - Total: 9.8 km^{2} (3.8 sq mi)

Population
  - Total: 77 (2021 census)
  - Density: 7.86/km^{2} (20.35/sq mi)
- Time zone: UTC+10:00 (AEST)
- Postcode: 4344
Suburbs around Lilydale
Iredale	Carpendale	Carpendale
Flagstone Creek	Lilydale	Veradilla
Flagstone Creek	Ma Ma Creek	Ma Ma Creek

Lilydale is a rural locality in the Lockyer Valley Region, Queensland, Australia. In the 2021 census, Lilydale had a population of 77 people.

== Geography ==
Flagstone Creek flows through the west of the locality. The land surrounding the creek is mostly used for irrigated crop growing. The centre and east of the locality is predominantly used for grazing on native vegetation.

== History ==
The locality was officially named and bounded by Minister for Natural Resources on 18 February 2000.

== Demographics ==
In the 2016 census, Lilydale had a population of 83 people.

In the 2021 census, Lilydale had a population of 77 people.

== Education ==
There are no schools in Lilydale. The nearest government primary schools are Flagstone Creek State School in neighbouring Flagstone Creek to the south-west and Ma Ma Creek State School in neighbouring Ma Ma Creek to the south-east. The nearest government secondary school is Lockyer District State High School in Gatton to the north-east.
