= Ma Ma Creek War Memorial =

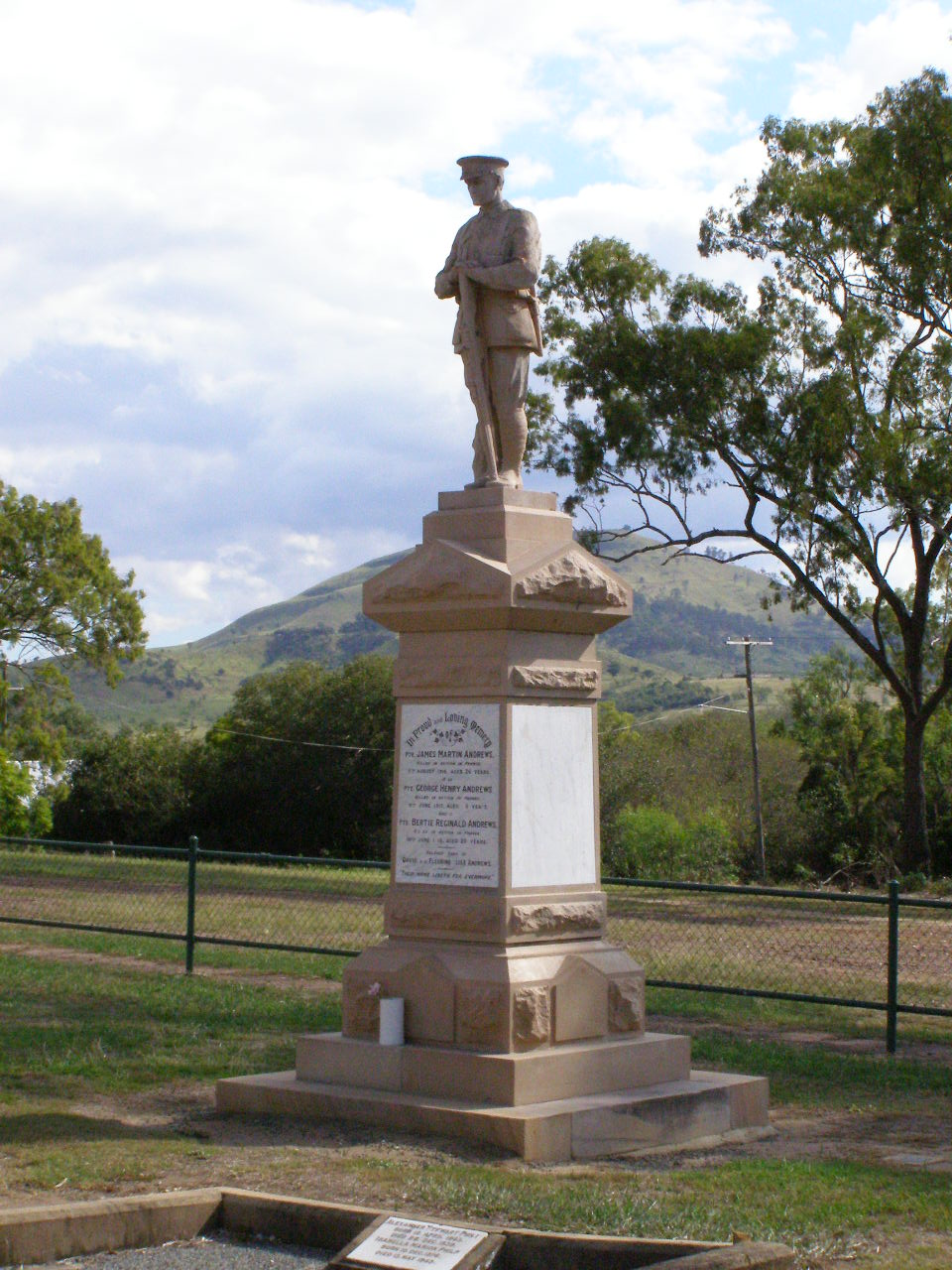
- War memorial in the grounds of St Stephen's Anglican Church cemetery at Ma Ma Creek, 2006

- Location within Queensland Location within Australia
- 27.6298°S 152.1897°E
- Location: Gatton Clifton Road, Ma Ma Creek, Queensland, Australia

History
- Design period: 1919 - 1930s (interwar period)
- Built: 1920
- Built for: Fleurine Elsie Andrews

Site notes
- Architect: Andrew Lang Petrie

Queensland Heritage Register
- Official name: Ma Ma Creek War Memorial
- Type: state heritage (built)
- Designated: 21 October 1992
- Reference no.: 600514
- Significant period: 1920-(social); 1920(historical, fabric)
- Significant components: cemetery, memorial - soldier statue
- Builders: Andrew Lang Petrie

Ma Ma Creek War Memorial is a heritage-listed memorial on the Gatton-Clifton Road, Ma Ma Creek, Queensland, Australia. It was completed in 1920. It was added to the Queensland Heritage Register on 21 October 1992.

== History ==
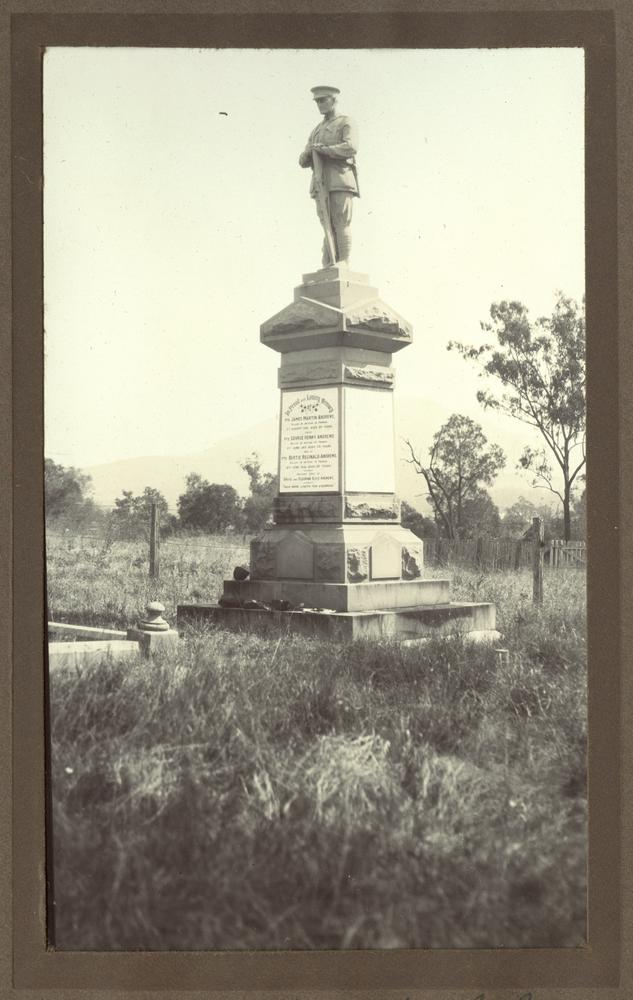
War memorial in the grounds of St Stephen's Anglican Church cemetery at Ma Ma Creek, 1920s

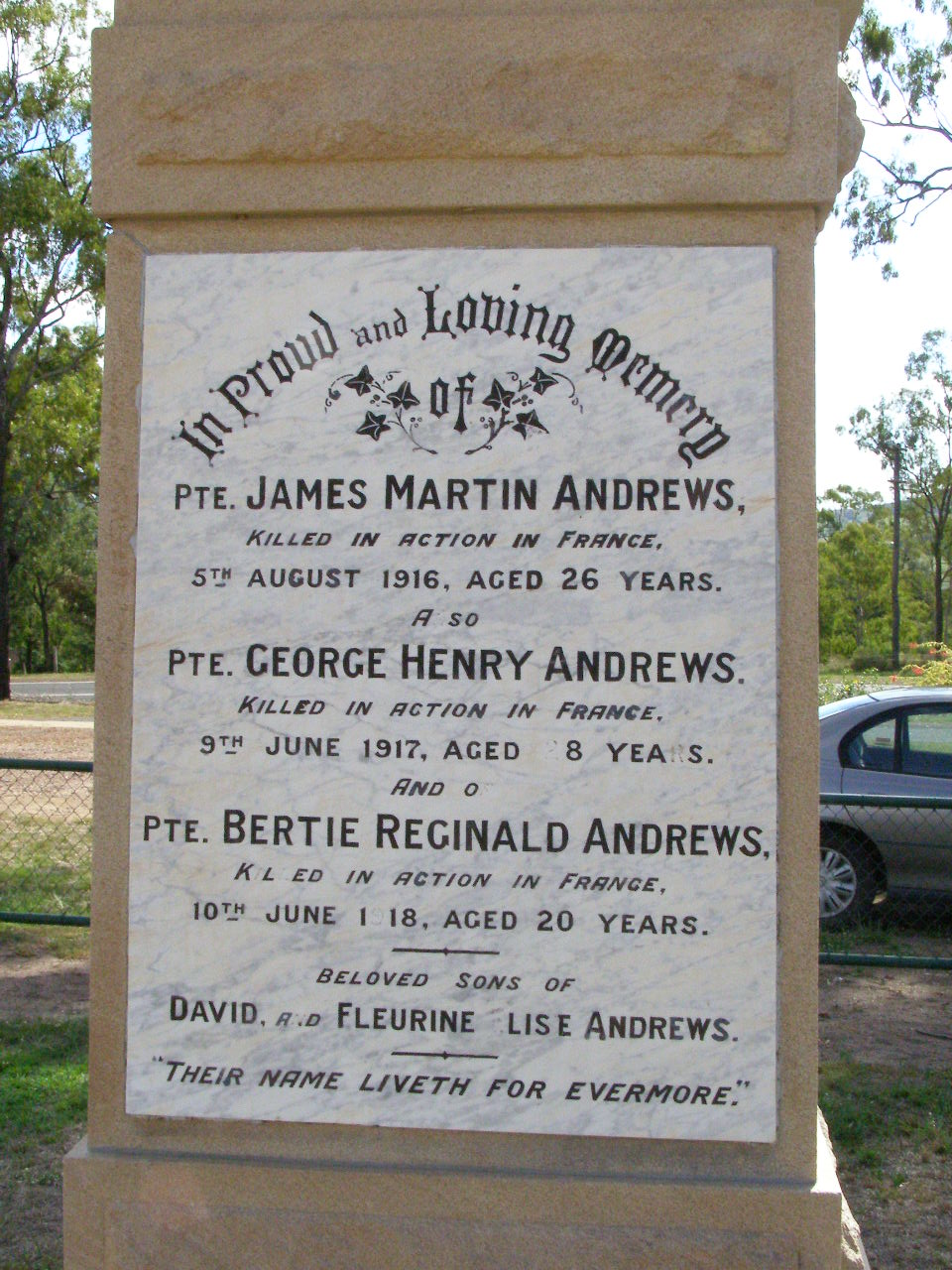
Ma Ma Creek War Memorial, tablet, 2006

The Ma Ma Creek War Memorial was erected in 1920 for Fleurine Elsie Andrews. It was designed and produced by A. L. Petrie and Son of Toowong, Brisbane.

After losing three sons in the First World War, Fleurine Elsie Andrews commissioned a memorial and donated an organ to the church in memory of her sons. The three sons were:

- Private James Martin Andrews (killed on 5 August 1916, aged 26 years)
- Private George Henry Andrews (killed on 9 June 1917, aged 28 years)
- Private Bertie Reginald Andrews (killed on 10 June 1918, aged 20 years)

All were killed in France.

The district of Ma Ma Creek probably takes its name from the aboriginal name for the creek which flows through the area, the Mia Mia. The area was one of the earliest settled parts of West Moreton, valued for its rich fertile lands and abundant water supply. The first settlers were mostly European and cleared both the ridges and the flats for grazing. Cotton growing was attempted in the 1870s, and again, more successfully, in the 1890s when Ipswich established a cotton mill. The area survives as a small township in the centre of a primarily agricultural area.

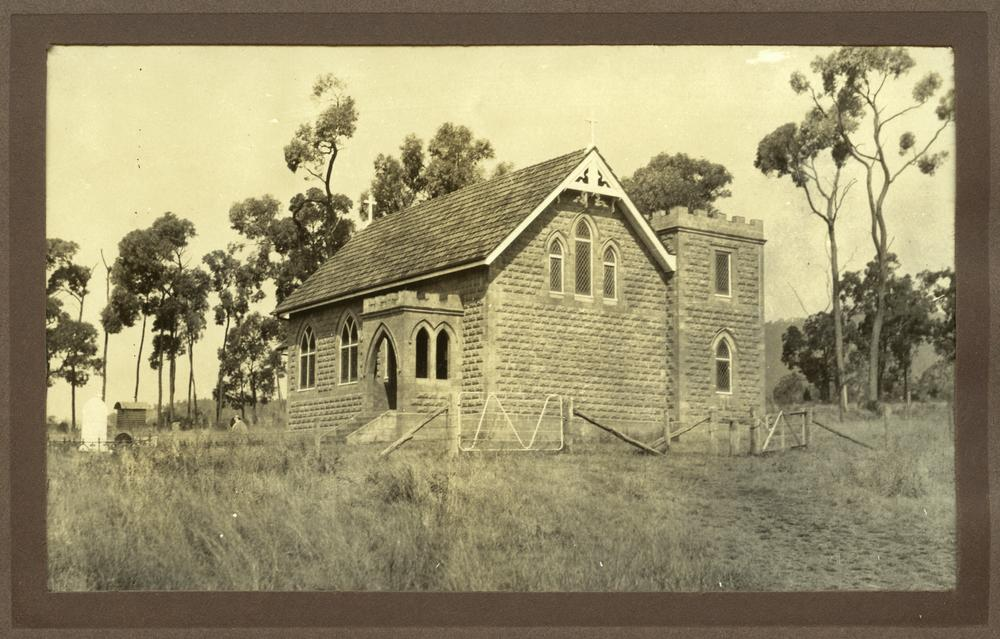
St Stephen's Anglican Church, Ma Ma Creek, 1920s

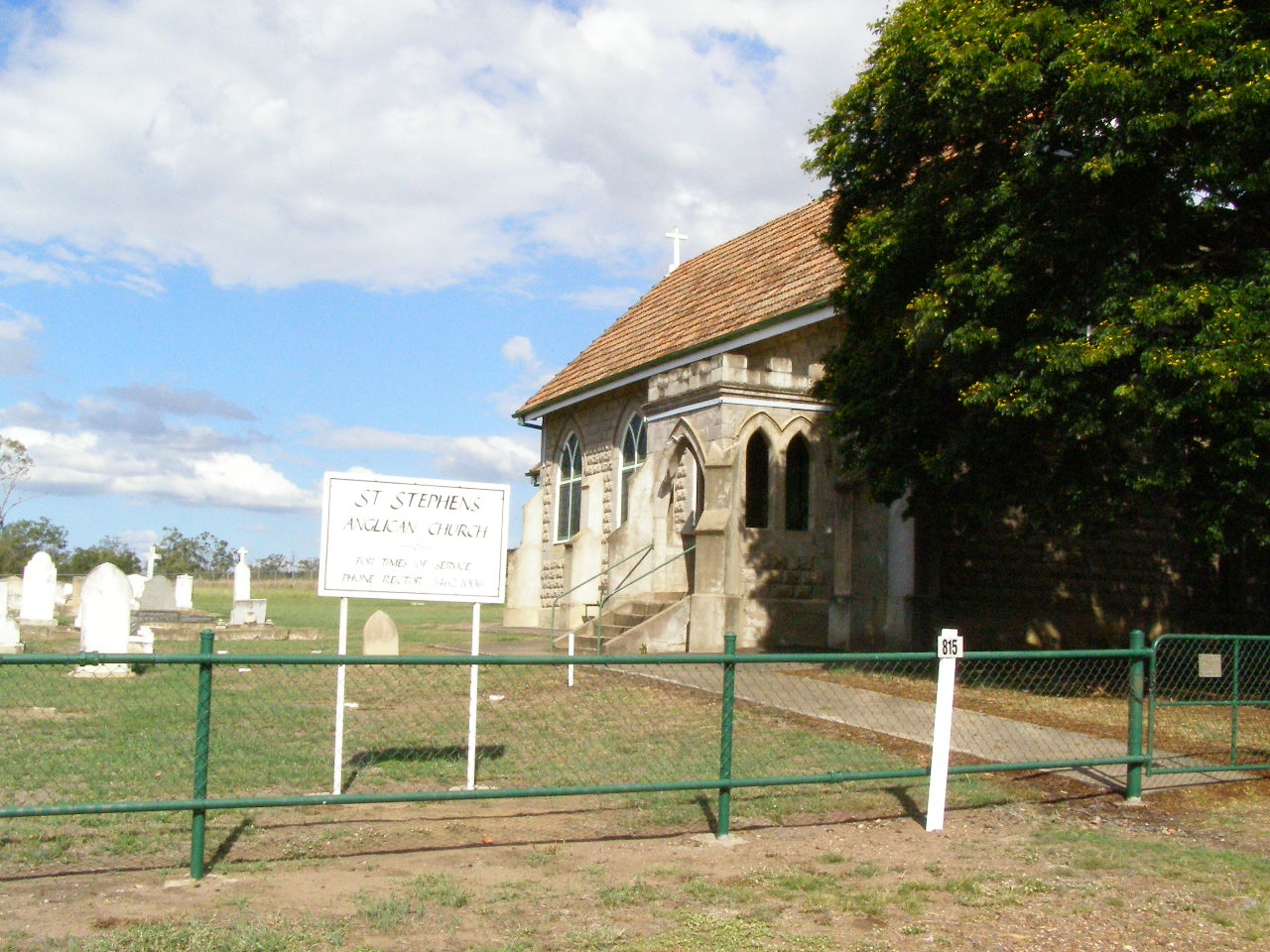
View of the church from the north, 2006

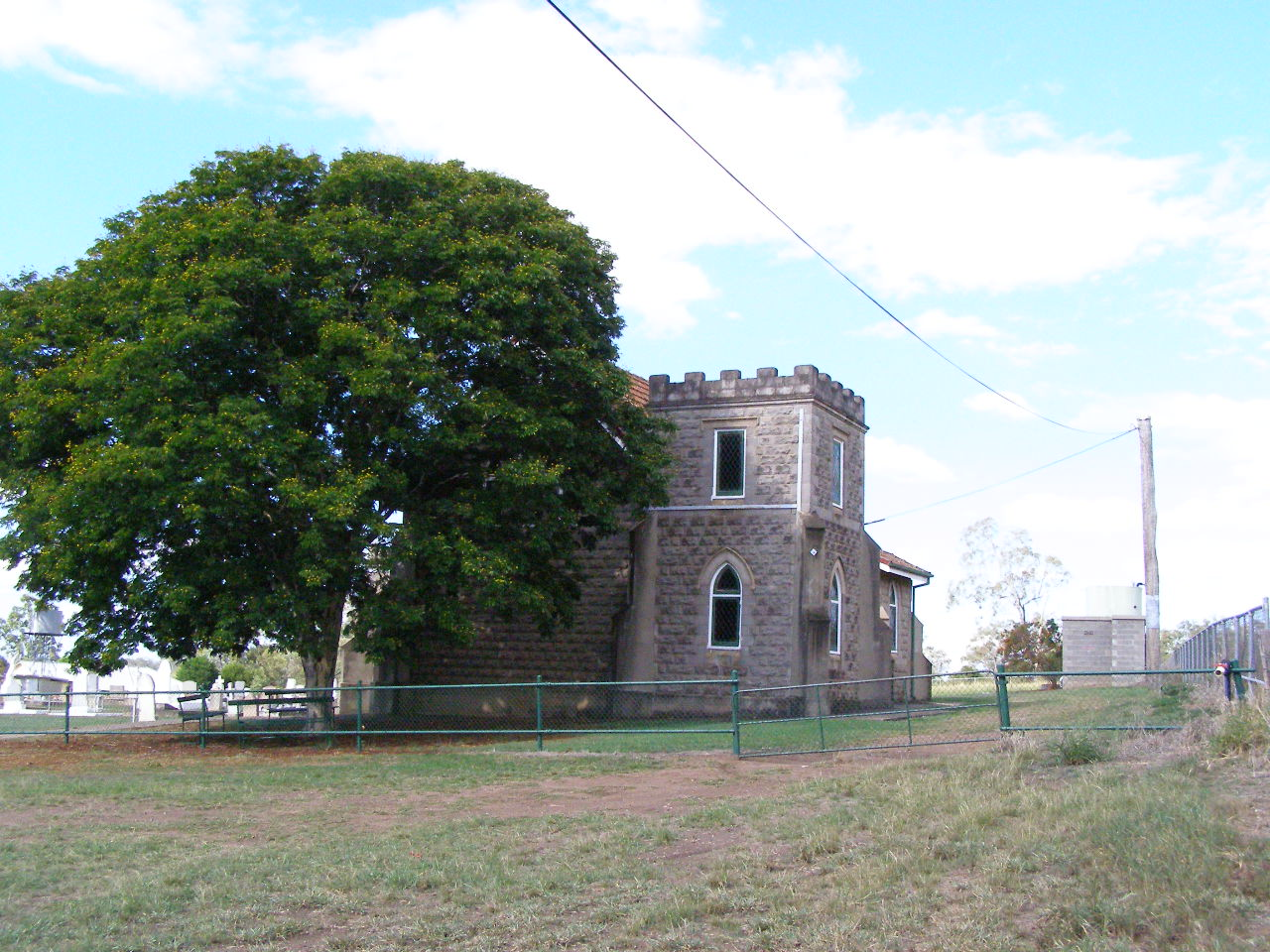
View of the church from the west, 2006

The cemetery at Ma Ma Creek was consecrated in April 1896 and small wooden church was erected to service to local Anglican community. In 1912, the existing church, designed by Brisbane architect, W C Voller, was erected.

The First World War Memorial is situated in the St Stephens cemetery, directly behind the Andrews family plot. Although privately owned, it became the focus of public Anzac Day memorial services.

Australia, and Queensland in particular, had few civic monuments before the First World War. The memorials erected in its wake became our first national monuments, recording the devastating impact of the war on a young nation. Australia lost 60,000 from a population of about 4 million, representing one in five of those who served. No previous or subsequent war has made such an impact on the nation.

Even before the end of the war, memorials became a spontaneous and highly visible expression of national grief. To those who erected them, they were as sacred as grave sites, substitute graves for the Australians whose bodies lay in battlefield cemeteries in Europe and the Middle East. British policy decreed that the Empire war dead were to be buried where they fell. The word "cenotaph", commonly applied to war memorials at the time, literally means "empty tomb".

Australian war memorials are distinctive in that they commemorate not only the dead. Australians were proud that their first great national army, unlike other belligerent armies, was composed entirely of volunteers, men worthy of honour whether or not they made the supreme sacrifice. Many memorials honour all who served from a locality, not just the dead, providing valuable evidence of community involvement in the war. Such evidence is not readily obtainable from military records, or from state or national listings, where names are categorised alphabetically or by military unit.

Australian war memorials are also valuable evidence of imperial and national loyalties, at the time, not seen as conflicting; the skills of local stonemasons, metalworkers and architects; and of popular taste. In Queensland, the soldier statue was the popular choice of memorial, whereas the obelisk predominated in the southern states, possibly a reflection of Queensland's larger working-class population and a lesser involvement of architects.

Many of the First World War monuments have been updated to record local involvement in later conflicts, and some have fallen victim to unsympathetic re-location and repair.

Although there are many different types of memorials in Queensland, the digger statue is the most common. It was the most popular choice of communities responsible for erecting the memorials, embodying the ANZAC spirit and representing the qualities of the ideal Australian: loyalty, courage, youth, innocence and masculinity. The digger was a phenomenon peculiar to Queensland, perhaps due to the fact that other states had followed Britain's lead and established Advisory Boards made up of architects and artists, prior to the erection of war memorials. The digger statue was not highly regarded by artists and architects who were involved in the design of relatively few Queensland memorials

Most statues were constructed by local masonry firms, although some were by artists or imported.

A L Petrie and Sons of Toowong were the largest monumental masonry firm in Queensland at this time and produced many war memorials throughout the state.

The memorial at Ma Ma Creek is a Petrie design on a standard base, also evident at Biggenden and Southport in Queensland and in New South Wales. This is the only remaining digger in Queensland to be depicted wearing a cap instead of a slouch hat. The only other known example was at Biggenden, which now has a replacement statue.

== Description ==
The First World War Memorial is situated in St Stephens cemetery on the Gatton-Clifton Road next to the State School. It is a small country cemetery located on the northern side of a cement block church and enclosed by a wire mesh fence. The site is elevated and all headstones, and the memorial, face east.

The memorial is located in the Andrews family plot at the front of the cemetery and is a prominent element in the setting from the roadway. It comprises a pedestal surmounted by a digger statue.

The sandstone memorial sits on a double stepped sandstone base with smooth faces. Surmounting this is a plinth with rough-cut faces, margined and chiselled around and a chamfered top. At the centre of each face is a smooth-faced sandstone plaque with a triangular top that projects into the chamfered surface. A L PETRIE is carved onto the front chamfered surface.

The pedestal comprises a smooth-faced square pillar with marble plaques on the front and side faces. The front plaque bears a leaded ivy leaf motif, inscriptions and the names and details of the three Andrews brothers killed in the First World War. At the top and bottom of the pier are rough-faced blocks, margined and chiselled around. The digger stands on a smooth-faced double step which surmounts a cornice with triangular pediments to each face. These are also rough-cut, margined and chiselled around.

The digger statue is depicted as life-sized with his head bowed and hands resting on a reversed rifle. Unusually for this type of the statue, the digger wears a cap instead on a slouch hat. He is supported by a tree stump at the rear.

== Heritage listing ==
Ma Ma Creek War Memorial was listed on the Queensland Heritage Register on 21 October 1992 having satisfied the following criteria.

The place is important in demonstrating the evolution or pattern of Queensland's history.

War Memorials are important in demonstrating the pattern of Queensland's history as they are representative of a recurrent theme that involved most communities throughout the state. They provide evidence of an era of widespread Australian patriotism and nationalism, particularly during and following the First World War.

The memorial is significant as evidence of the extent of personal impact experienced by families throughout Queensland after the First World War.

The place demonstrates rare, uncommon or endangered aspects of Queensland's cultural heritage.

This particular digger statue is uncommon in that it is portrayed wearing a cap rather than the usual slouch hat. It is also a rare example of a privately erected memorial situated in a graveyard.

The place is important in demonstrating the principal characteristics of a particular class of cultural places.

The monuments manifest a unique documentary record and are demonstrative of popular taste in the inter-war period.

Erected in 1920 the memorial at Ma Ma Creek demonstrates the principal characteristics of a commemorative structure erected as an enduring record of a major historical event. This is achieved through the use of appropriate materials and design elements. As a digger statue it is representative of the most popular form of memorial in Queensland.

The place is important because of its aesthetic significance.

The memorial is of aesthetic significance as a distinctive landmark in an otherwise typical country churchyard and also for its high degree of workmanship and design.

The place has a strong or special association with a particular community or cultural group for social, cultural or spiritual reasons.

It has special association with the Andrews family, who erected the memorial after losing three members in the First World War and also with the local community, as the focal point for public remembrance services.

The place has a special association with the life or work of a particular person, group or organisation of importance in Queensland's history.

It has special association with the Andrews family, who erected the memorial after losing three members in the First World War and also with the local community, as the focal point for public remembrance services.

The memorial also has special association with monumental masonry firm A L Petrie and Son as an intact example of their workmanship.
