= Lower Tenthill, Queensland =

Lower Tenthill
- Suburb
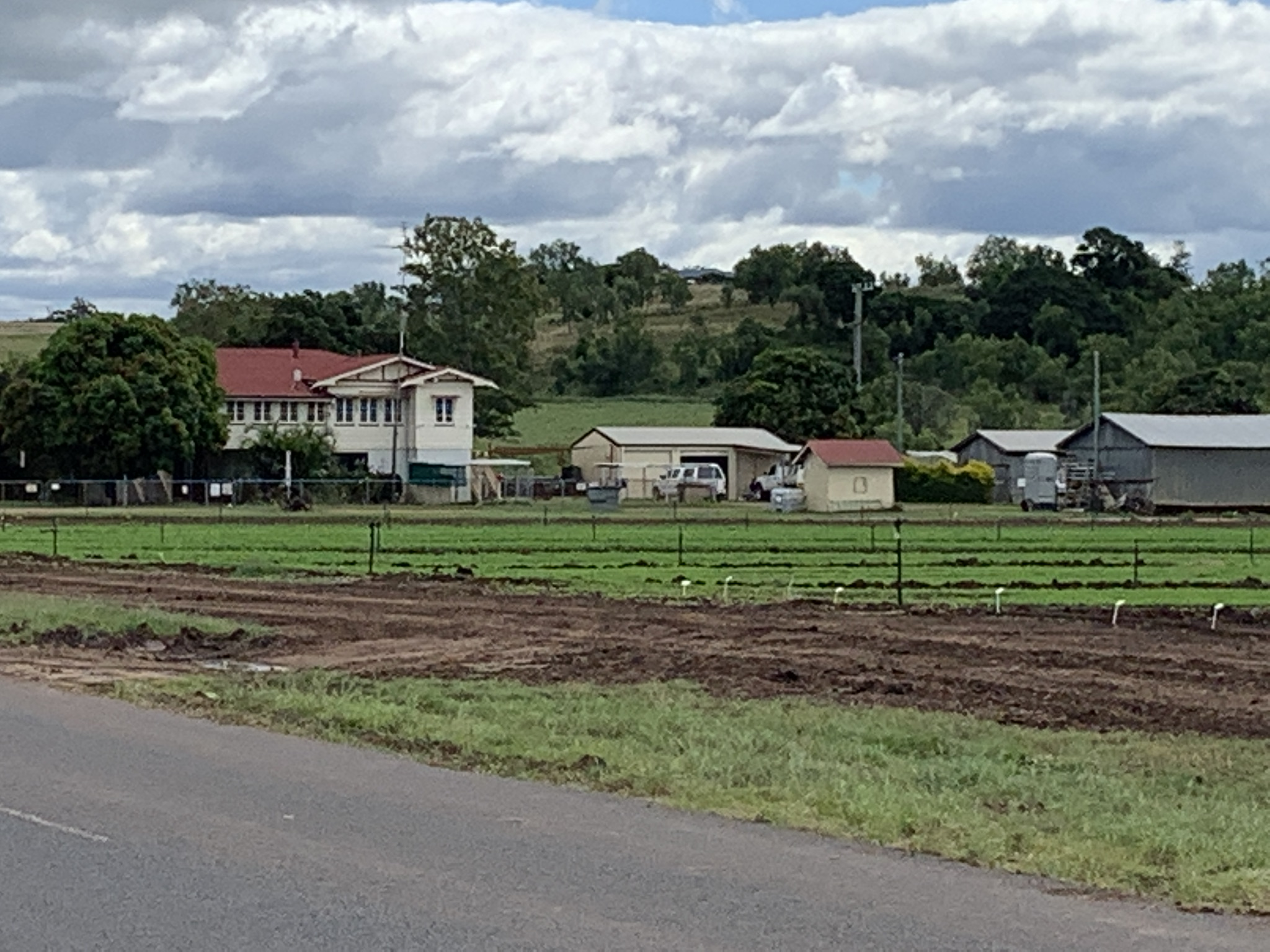
- Houses and fields of lettuce, Lower Tenthill, 2022

- Interactive map of Lower Tenthill
- Coordinates: 27.6038°S 152.2386°E
- Country: Australia
- State: Queensland
- LGA: Lockyer Valley Region
- Location: 7.5 km (4.7 mi) SW of Gatton; 33.0 km (20.5 mi) E of Toowoomba; 99.1 km (61.6 mi) WSW of Brisbane

Government
  - State electorate: Lockyer
  - Federal division: Wright

Area
  - Total: 26.1 km^{2} (10.1 sq mi)

Population
  - Total: 236 (2021 census)
  - Density: 9.04/km^{2} (23.42/sq mi)
- Time zone: UTC+10:00 (AEST)
- Postcode: 4343
Suburbs around Lower Tenthill
Grantham	Placid Hills	Gatton
Winwill	Lower Tenthill	Woodlands
Ma Ma Creek	Upper Tenthill	Ropeley

Lower Tenthill is a rural locality in the Lockyer Valley Region, Queensland, Australia. In the 2021 census, Lower Tenthill had a population of 236 people.

== Geography ==
Agriculture has developed along Tenthill Creek which also forms part of both the south-western and north-eastern boundary of Lower Tenthill. Lower Tenthill Weir on Tenthill Creek, has a storage capacity of 70 ML and is used for the purpose of recharging groundwater supplies. The northern boundary follows Lockyer Creek. Two other creeks cross the area - Ma Ma Creek and Deep Creek. The locality is within the North East Coast drainage basin.

The Gatton-Helidon Road runs just inside part of the northern boundary. The Gatton–Clifton Road (State Route 80) passes through from north to west.

== History ==
The name Tenthill comes from the name of a pastoral property established by 1845 by Phillip Friell.

Tent Hill State School opened in 1873. It was renamed Tent Hill Lower State School in 1876, but it was also unofficially known as Lower Tent Hill State School.

== Demographics ==
In the 2011 census, Lower Tenthill recorded a population of 333 people.

In the 2016 census, Lower Tenthill had a population of 252 people.

In the 2021 census, Lower Tenthill had a population of 236 people.

== Education ==
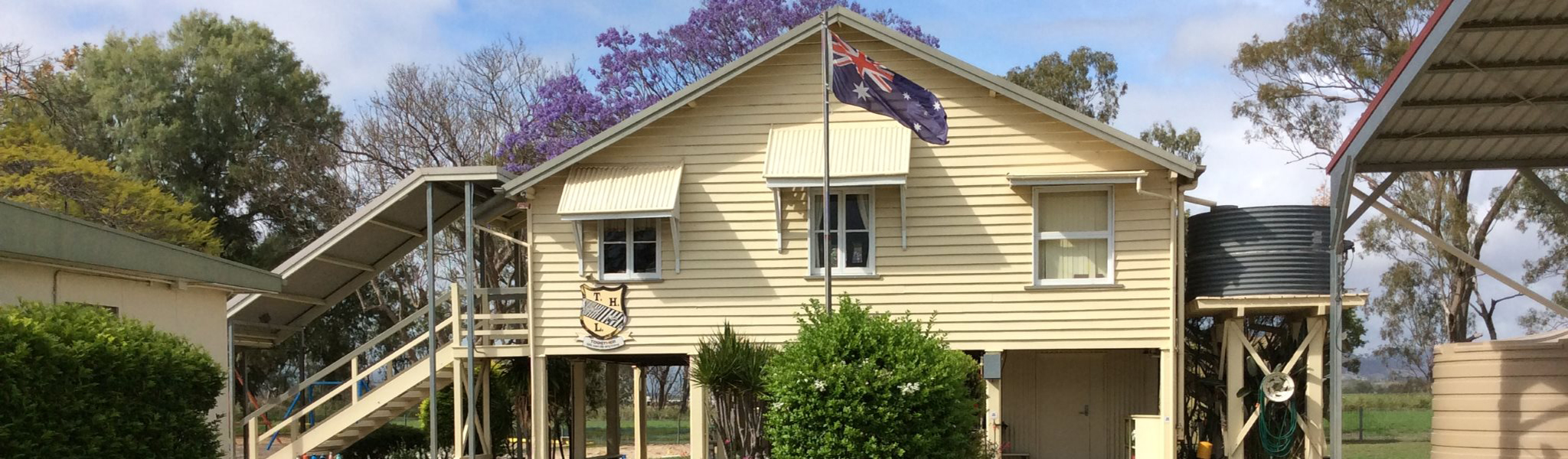
Older school building, circa 2022

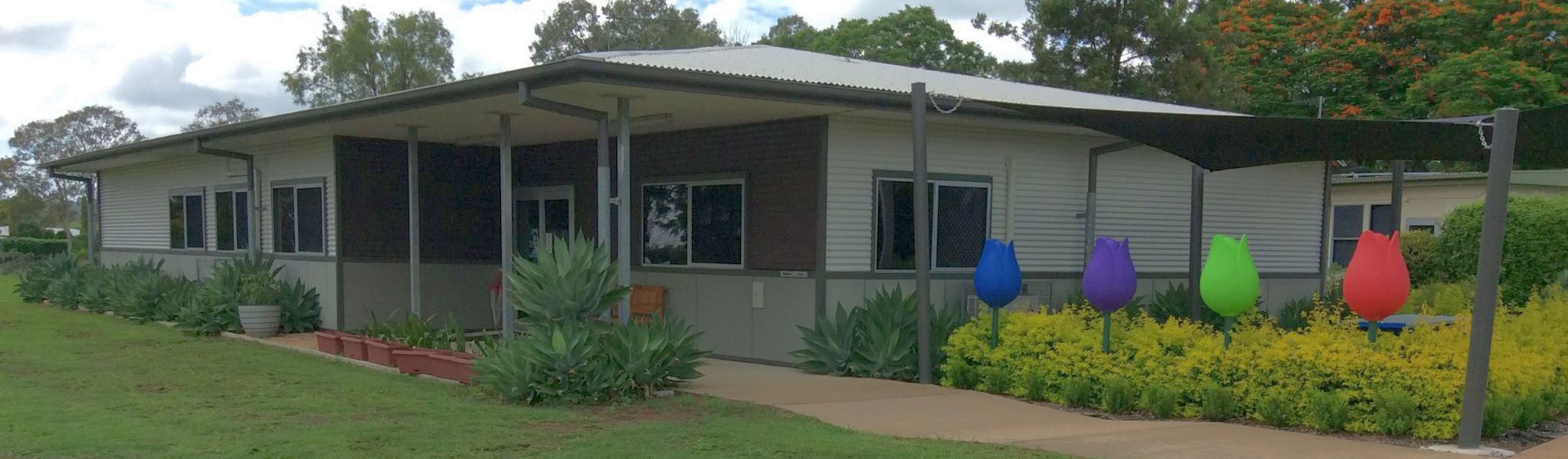
Newer school building, circa 2022

Tent Hill Lower State School is a government primary (Prep-6) school for boys and girls at 90 Lower Tenthill Road (27.59202°S 152.23628°E). In 2017, the school had an enrolment of 66 students with 6 teachers (5 full-time equivalent) and 5 non-teaching staff (2 full-time equivalent). In 2018, the school had an enrolment of 69 students with 5 teachers and 6 non-teaching staff (3 full-time equivalent).

There are no secondary schools in Lower Tenthill. The nearest government secondary school is Lockyer District State High School in neighbouring Gatton to the north-east.
