= Weeping Mother Memorial =

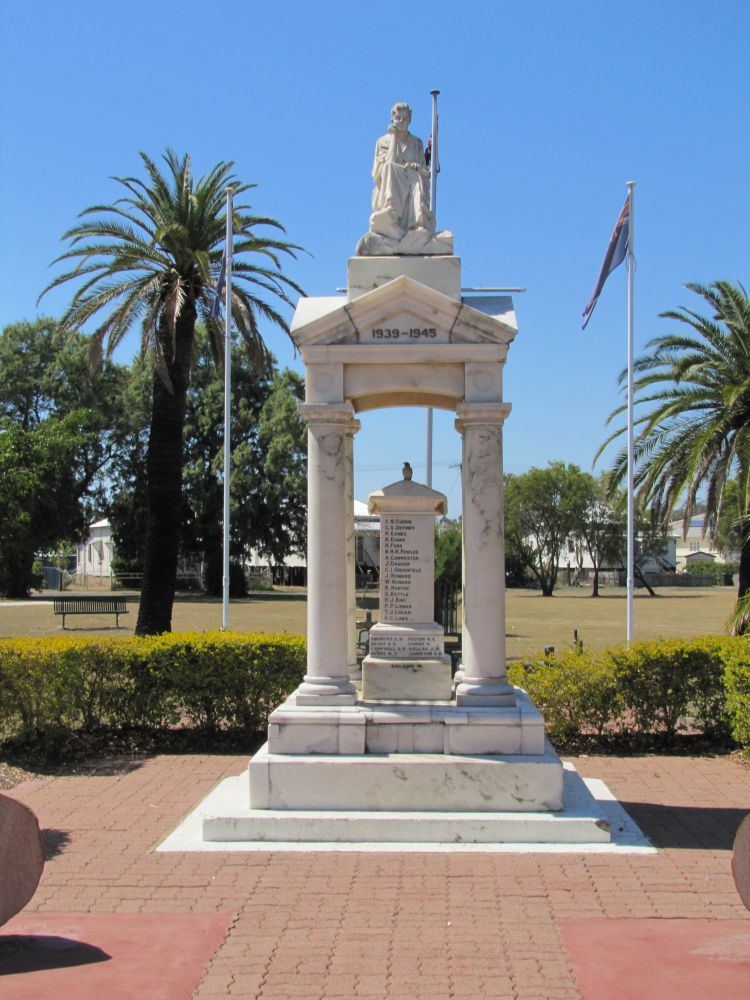
- Weeping Mother Memorial, 2012

- Location within Queensland Location within Australia
- 27.554°S 152.2788°E
- Location: Hickey Street, Gatton, Queensland, Australia

History
- Design period: 1919–1930s (interwar period)
- Built: 1922

Site notes
- Architect: F. Williams & Co

Queensland Heritage Register
- Official name: Weeping Mother Memorial
- Type: state heritage (landscape, built)
- Designated: 21 October 1992
- Reference no.: 600511
- Significant period: 1922– (social); 1922 (historical, fabric)
- Significant components: war trophy/ies, park / green space, trees/plantings, flagpole/flagstaff, memorial – mausoleum, pathway/walkway
- Builders: F Williams & Co (Ipswich)

Weeping Mother Memorial is a heritage-listed memorial at Hickey Street, Gatton, Queensland, Australia. It was designed by F. Williams & Co and built in 1922 by the same company. The memorial was added to the Queensland Heritage Register on 21 October 1992.

== History ==
The Gatton Weeping Mothers War Memorial was designed and produced by well known and highly regarded Ipswich mason Frank Williams. The marble memorial honours the 68 local men who fell during the First World War.

The memorial cost over £500 which was raised through public subscription. A memorial committee was formed and the Chairman, Richard James laid the foundation stone on 22 April 1922. The memorial was unveiled by the Governor of Queensland, Sir Matthew Nathan, on 14 November 1922.

In 1933, a light to illuminate the statue at night was added by the Gatton RSL and Women's Auxiliary and was officially switched on by ex-First World War nurse, Nurse Pollock on Armistice Day.

Australia, and Queensland in particular, had few civic monuments before the First World War. The memorials erected in its wake became our first national monuments, recording the devastating impact of the war on a young nation. Australia lost 60,000 from a population of about 4 million, representing one in five of those who served. No previous or subsequent war has made such an impact on the nation.

Even before the end of the war, memorials became a spontaneous and highly visible expression of national grief. To those who erected them, they were as sacred as grave sites, substitute graves for the Australians whose bodies lay in battlefield cemeteries in Europe and the Middle East. British policy decreed that the Empire war dead were to be buried where they fell. The word "cenotaph", commonly applied to war memorials at the time, literally means "empty tomb".

Australian war memorials are distinctive in that they commemorate not only the dead. Australians were proud that their first great national army, unlike other belligerent armies, was composed entirely of volunteers, men worthy of honour whether or not they made the supreme sacrifice. Many memorials honour all who served from a locality, not just the dead, providing valuable evidence of community involvement in the war. Such evidence is not readily obtainable from military records, or from state or national listings, where names are categorised alphabetically or by military unit.

Australian war memorials are also valuable evidence of imperial and national loyalties, at the time, not seen as conflicting; the skills of local stonemasons, metalworkers and architects; and of popular taste. In Queensland, the soldier statue was the popular choice of memorial, whereas the obelisk predominated in the southern states, possibly a reflection of Queensland's larger working-class population and a lesser involvement of architects.

Many of the First World War monuments have been updated to record local involvement in later conflicts, and some have fallen victim to unsympathetic re-location and repair.

Many different types of war memorials were erected throughout Queensland, however none are as emotive or as unique in design as the one at Gatton. At the laying of the foundation stone, the memorial was said to be an expression of sympathy with the mothers of fallen soldiers.

== Description ==
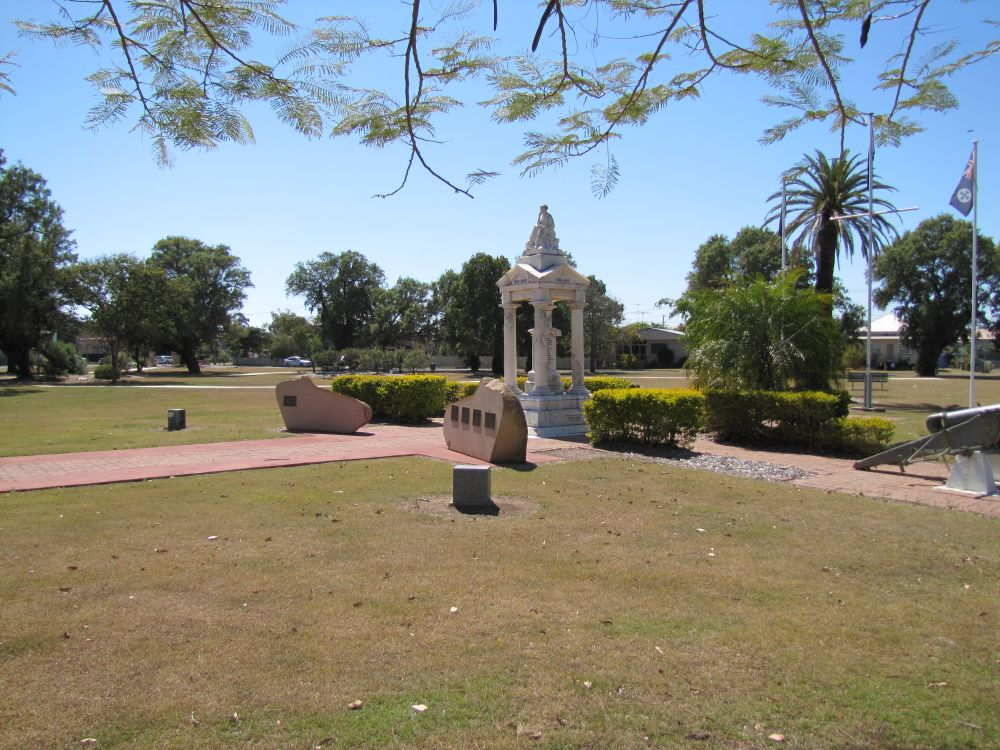
Memorial in the park, 2012

The First World War Memorial is situated in a park setting and is surrounded by mature trees.

The memorial is located in comparatively new landscaping comprising paved pathways and gardens beds with new planting. It is approached by a path from Hickey Street which passes a bottle tree. New sandstone slabs with bronze plates to the front faces are located on either side of the path leading to the monuments. These are memorials to soldiers in later conflicts.

The pathways form a cross with the monument located at the centre. A gun or "war trophy" is located at the rear and each side of the monument. A flagpole is located to one side.

The monument itself stands on a concrete base step. Above this are two smooth-faced marble steps capped by a rounded moulding. The first step is square in plan, whilst the upper one steps in at the centre of each face.

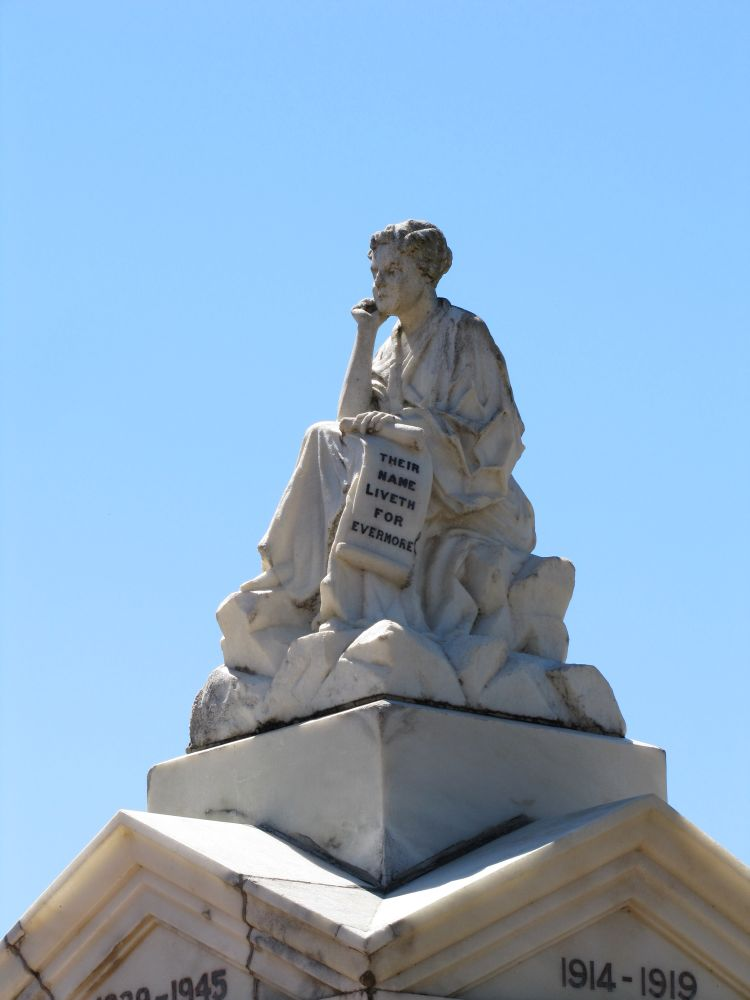
Statue of the weeping mother, 2012

Above this base is a mausoleum type structure comprising four columns and a roof. The floor, from which a central square pillar rises, is laid with black and white marble tiles in a chequerboard pattern. The pillar sits on a base of two steps and is partially covered with a tasselled shroud. It bears the leaded names of the 68 local men who fell in the First World War. The names of those who fell in later conflicts are recorded on the base of the pillar; 23 in the Second World War and 2 in the Vietnam War.

The pillar is flanked by columns at each corner. Each has simply moulded bases, and Greek egg-and-dart ornamentation at the top. The columns support a roof like structure which sits on square blocks at each corner. A curved fascia spans between each block and the roof structure has a pediment to each face. The dates 1939–1945 are leaded on the front face. At the centre of the roof is a square base with a mound of rocks above it. Sitting on this is a two-thirds life-size figure of a weeping mother. Her chin rests on her right hand and she holds a scroll which bears the leaded inscription "Their names liveth forevermore".

The monument is made up of different types of marbles. The figure itself is of coarse Ulam Marble. Finer marble with a grey grain has been used in some areas such as the columns and base and black marble has been used on the floor.

== Heritage listing ==
Weeping Mother Memorial was listed on the Queensland Heritage Register on 21 October 1992 having satisfied the following criteria.

The place is important in demonstrating the evolution or pattern of Queensland's history.

War Memorials are important in demonstrating the pattern of Queensland's history as they are representative of a recurrent theme that involved most communities throughout the state. They provide evidence of an era of widespread Australian patriotism and nationalism, particularly during and following the First World War

The place demonstrates rare, uncommon or endangered aspects of Queensland's cultural heritage.

Its design is unique in Queensland and possibly in Australia.

The place is important in demonstrating the principal characteristics of a particular class of cultural places.

The monuments manifest a unique documentary record and are demonstrative of popular taste in the inter-war period.

The memorial at Gatton demonstrates the principal characteristics of a commemorative structure erected as an enduring record of a major historical event. This is achieved through the use of appropriate materials and design elements.

The place is important because of its aesthetic significance.

The memorial is of aesthetic significance as a landmark and also for its high degree of workmanship and design.

The place has a strong or special association with a particular community or cultural group for social, cultural or spiritual reasons.

It has a strong and continuing association with the community as evidence of the impact of a major historic event and as the focal point for the remembrance of that event It also has a special association as an exemplary example of mason and sculptor Frank Williams’ work.

The place has a special association with the life or work of a particular person, group or organisation of importance in Queensland's history.

It has a strong and continuing association with the community as evidence of the impact of a major historic event and as the focal point for the remembrance of that event It also has a special association as an exemplary example of mason and sculptor Frank Williams’ work.
