= Ringwood, Queensland =

Ringwood
- Suburb
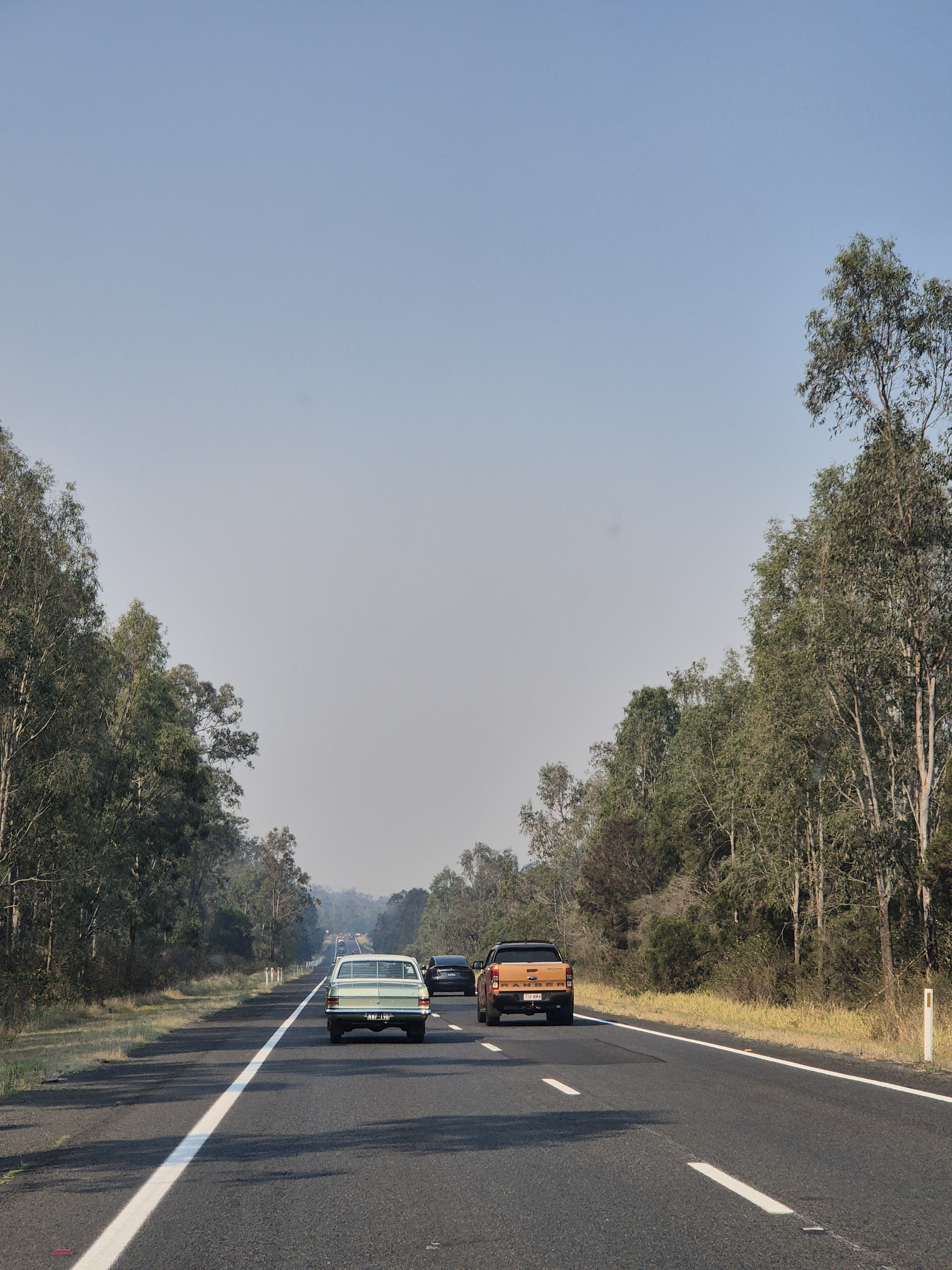
- Warrego Highway, 2025

- Interactive map of Ringwood
- Coordinates: 27.5244°S 152.2288°E
- Country: Australia
- State: Queensland
- LGA: Lockyer Valley Region
- Location: 10.2 km (6.3 mi) NW of Gatton; 41.5 km (25.8 mi) E of Toowoomba; 62.8 km (39.0 mi) NW of Ipswich; 96.7 km (60.1 mi) W of Brisbane

Government
  - State electorate: Lockyer
  - Federal division: Wright

Area
  - Total: 17.6 km^{2} (6.8 sq mi)

Population
  - Total: 57 (2021 census)
  - Density: 3.24/km^{2} (8.39/sq mi)
- Time zone: UTC+10:00 (AEST)
- Postcode: 4343
Suburbs around Ringwood
Seventeen Mile	Vinegar Hill	Vinegar Hill
Grantham	Ringwood	Adare
Grantham	Gatton	Gatton

Ringwood is a rural locality in the Lockyer Valley Region, Queensland, Australia. In the 2021 census, Ringwood had a population of 57 people.

== Geography ==
Ringwood is located on the Warrego Highway which forms its southern boundary. The southern half of the locality is about 110–130 metres (360–430 ft) above sea level and is predominantly used for crops and grazing. The northern half is more rugged rising to an unnamed peak at 340 metres (1,120 ft) at the locality's north-western edge; this land is undeveloped bushland. The locality is almost entirely freehold land.

== Demographics ==
In the 2016 census, Ringwood had a population of 66 people.

In the 2021 census, Ringwood had a population of 57 people.

== Education ==
There are no schools in Ringwood. The nearest government primary schools are Gatton State School in neighbouring Gatton to the south-east and Grantham State School in neighbouring Grantham to the south-west. The nearest government secondary school is Lockyer District State High School, also in Gatton. There are also some non-government schools in Gatton.
