= Placid Hills, Queensland =

Placid Hills
- Suburb
- Interactive map of Placid Hills
- Coordinates: 27.5613°S 152.2347°E
- Country: Australia
- State: Queensland
- LGA: Lockyer Valley Region
- Location: 5.8 km (3.6 mi) W of Gatton; 31.6 km (19.6 mi) E of Toowoomba; 49.7 km (30.9 mi) W of Ipswich; 97.1 km (60.3 mi) W of Brisbane

Government
  - State electorate: Lockyer
  - Federal division: Wright

Area
  - Total: 7.5 km^{2} (2.9 sq mi)

Population
  - Total: 796 (2021 census)
  - Density: 106.1/km^{2} (274.9/sq mi)
- Time zone: UTC+10:00 (AEST)
- Postcode: 4343
Suburbs around Placid Hills
Grantham	Gatton	Gatton
Grantham	Placid Hills	Gatton
Grantham	Lower Tenthill	Gatton

Placid Hills is a mixed-use locality on the western outskirts of the town of Gatton in the Lockyer Valley Region, Queensland, Australia. In the 2021 census, Placid Hills had a population of 796 people.

== Geography ==
Lockyer Creek forms much of the eastern and eastern boundaries.

The Gatton Clifton Road (State Route 80) passes to the south of the locality (Lower Tenthill), then becomes part of the south-western boundary of the locality, and exits to the west (Grantham).

The Western railway line forms the northern and north-western boundaries of the locality, entering from the north-east (Gatton) and exiting to the west (Grantham). No railway stations serve the locality.

The land use is mostly rural residential in the north of the locality with the south of the locality being used for grazing on native vegetation and crop growing.

== History ==
The locality was officially named and bounded by the Minister for Natural Resources on 18 February 2000.

== Demographics ==
In the 2016 census, Placid Hills had a population of 832 people.

In the 2021 census, Placid Hills had a population of 796 people.

== Education ==
There are no schools in Placid Hills. The nearest government primary schools are Grantham State School in neighbouring Grantham to the west and Tenthill Lower State School in neighbouring Lower Tenthill to the south. The nearest government secondary school is Lockyer District State High School in neighbouring Gatton to the east.
