= Gatton Star =

Weekly online newspaper in Gatton, Queensland, Australia

The Gatton, Lockyer and Brisbane Valley Star is a free weekly online newspaper in Gatton, Queensland, Australia.

== History ==
The newspaper was first published on 28 September 1956 under the title Gatton Star.

Along with many other regional Australian newspapers owned by NewsCorp, the Gatton Star ceased print editions in June 2020 and became an online-only publication.
