= Grantham, Queensland =

Grantham
- Town
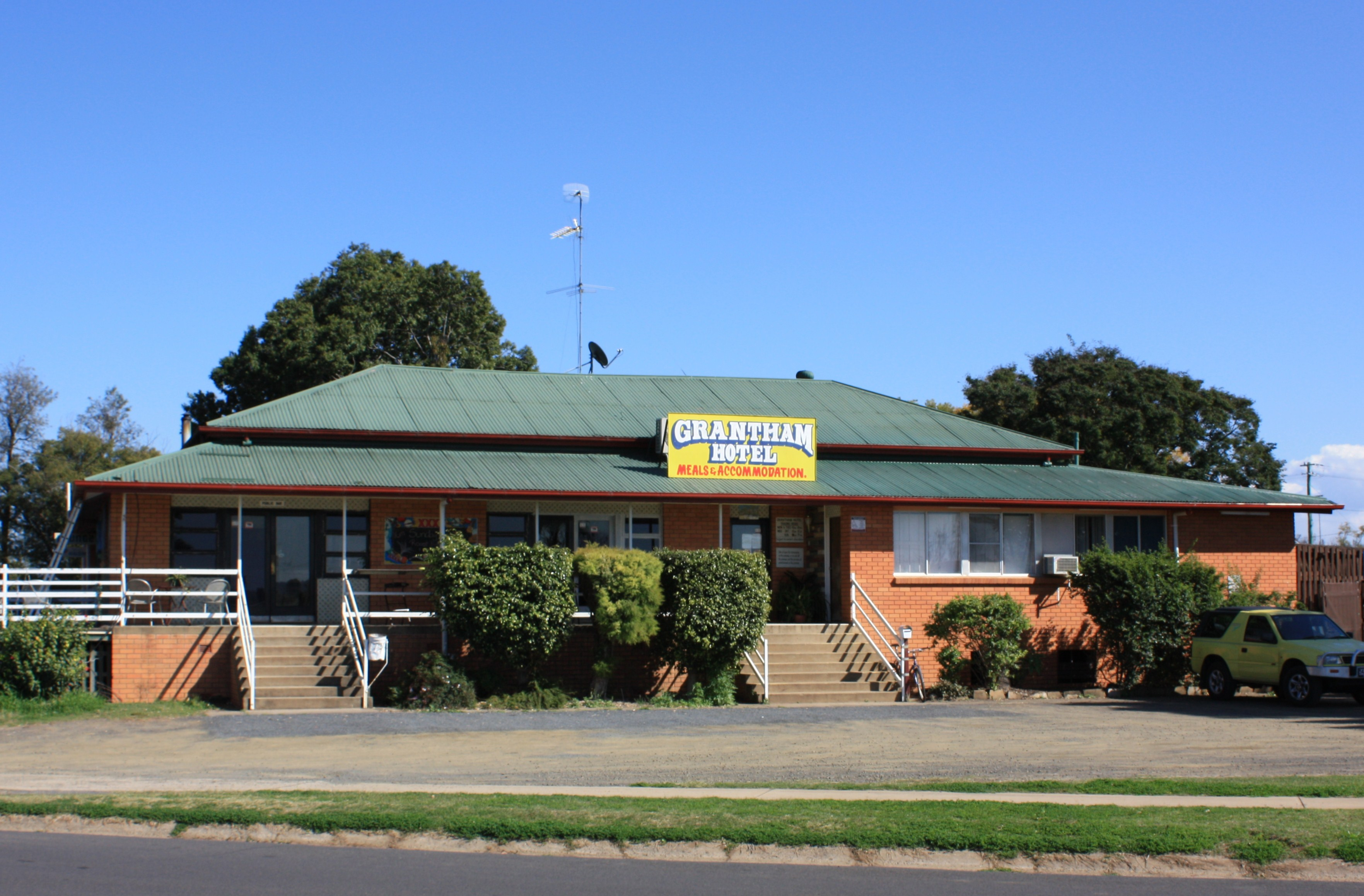
- Grantham Hotel, located in Anzac Ave

- Interactive map of Grantham
- Coordinates: 27.5769°S 152.2022°E
- Country: Australia
- State: Queensland
- LGA: Lockyer Valley Region
- Location: 9.8 km (6.1 mi) WSW of Gatton; 29.4 km (18.3 mi) E of Toowoomba; 63.9 km (39.7 mi) W of Ipswich; 98.2 km (61.0 mi) W of Brisbane

Government
  - State electorate: Lockyer
  - Federal division: Wright

Area
  - Total: 49.3 km^{2} (19.0 sq mi)
- Elevation: 109 m (358 ft)

Population
  - Total: 796 (2021 census)
  - Density: 16.146/km^{2} (41.82/sq mi)
- Time zone: UTC+10:00 (AEST)
- Postcode: 4347
- County: Cavendish
- Parish: Lockyer
Localities around Grantham
Helidon	Seventeen Mile	Ringwood
Helidon	Grantham	Gatton; Placid Hills
Carpendale	Veradilla; Winwill	Lower Tenthill

Grantham is a rural town and locality in the Lockyer Valley Region, Queensland, Australia. The town is located 100 kilometres (62 mi) west of the state capital, Brisbane. In the 2021 census, the locality of Grantham had a population of 796 people.

== Geography ==
The Warrego Highway passes through from east to west. The north-west corner is occupied by part of the Lockyer State Forest.

== History ==
The area was first settled in 1841, by George Mocatta. He named his pastoral run Grantham, which became the name of the town.

In 1866, a railway siding from the main Toowoomba line was opened which assisted in the development of a small settlement. It wasn't until the mid-1870s that the Grantham railway station was built.

In August 1895, tenders were called for the erection of a provisional school at Grantham Scrub. In January 1896 teacher, Catherine M. Ludeman was appointed to the Grantham Scrub Provisional School, suggesting it opened around that time. On 1 January 1909, it became Grantham Scrub State School. It closed circa 1950. It was located at 119 Missouri Road (corner of Grantham Scrub Road, 27.59327°S 152.18507°E) within the present-day locality of neighbouring Veradilla.

Grantham Provisional School opened on 23 January 1905. On 1 January 1909 it became Grantham State School.

A butter factory was established in 1907. The building was replaced in 1926 by a brick building which operated until 1971.

Grantham Post Office opened on 1 January 1890 (a receiving office had been open from 1876).

On 10 January 2011, Grantham was severely damaged in a huge flash flood. 12 people died and a large number of houses and other buildings were destroyed. Following the floods, Grantham received visits by politicians including Queensland Premier Anna Bligh on numerous occasions. Australia's Governor-General Quentin Bryce also visited the town. In May 2011, it was announced that the town would be moved to higher ground to prevent future damaging floods. A 935-acre site was purchased so that landholders could be provided a voluntary swap of equivalent-sized blocks. The new site is situated on a hill overlooking Grantham and has permission from the state government to bypass the normal development approval process. Residents of nearby Murphys Creek, Postmans Ridge, Withcott and Helidon have been included in the fast-tracked plan. As of March 2022, 110 houses are on the hill but over 50 dwellings remain in the older part of town.

== Demographics ==
In the 2016 census, the locality of Grantham had a population of 634 people. 81.1% of people were born in Australia and 90.9% of people spoke only English at home. The most common responses for religion were No Religion 24.3%, Catholic 17.8% and Anglican 15.5%.

In the 2021 census, the locality of Grantham had a population of 796 people.

== Education ==
Grantham State School is a government primary (Prep–6) school for boys and girls at 15 Victor Street (27.5740°S 152.2020°E). In 2017, the school had an enrolment of 95 students with 6 teachers and 6 non-teaching staff (4 full-time equivalent).

There are no secondary schools in Grantham. The nearest government secondary school is Lockyer District State High School in neighbouring Gatton to the east.
