= Helidon, Queensland =

Helidon
- Town
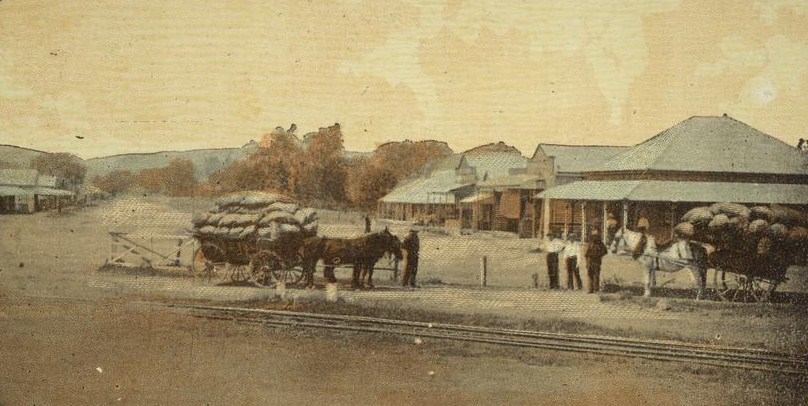
- Helidon, Queensland

- Interactive map of Helidon
- Coordinates: 27.5503°S 152.1260°E
- Country: Australia
- State: Queensland
- LGA: Lockyer Valley Region
- Location: 18.1 km (11.2 mi) W of Gatton; 21.3 km (13.2 mi) E of Toowoomba; 70.4 km (43.7 mi) W of Ipswich; 108 km (67 mi) W of Brisbane

Government
  - State electorate: Lockyer
  - Federal division: Division of Wright

Area
  - Total: 48.8 km^{2} (18.8 sq mi)

Population
  - Total: 1,130 (2021 census)
  - Density: 23.16/km^{2} (60.0/sq mi)
- Time zone: UTC+10:00 (AEST)
- Postcode: 4344
- County: Cavendish
- Parish: Helidon
Localities around Helidon
Upper Lockyer	White Mountain; Seventeen Mile	Seventeen Mile
Lockyer; Helidon Spa	Helidon	Grantham
Iredale	Iredale; Carpendale	Carpendale

Helidon is a rural town and locality in the Lockyer Valley Region, Queensland, Australia. In the 2021 census, the locality of Helidon had a population of 1,130 people.

Helidon is known in Queensland for its high quality sandstone (also called freestone), used extensively in private and public buildings in the state and elsewhere, including Brisbane City Hall, Brisbane Treasury Building, University of Queensland, and sought after internationally for its quality, especially in China.

Helidon is also the location of a natural mineral spring whose products were sold by the Helidon Spa Water Company, now known as Kirks.

== Geography ==
Helidon is located on the Warrego Highway, 106 kilometres (66 mi) west of the state capital, Brisbane, and 21 kilometres (13 mi) east of Toowoomba.

Parts of the hilly, undeveloped north of Helidon have been protected within Lockyer National Park.

== History ==
The Helidon district is called by Aboriginal inhabitants "Yabarba", the name of the Curriejung, and the nearby spring is known as "Woonar-rajimmi", the place "where the clouds fell down!"

The name Helidon derives from a pastoral run name established in 1841 by Richard Jones (1786–1852), a merchant and pastoralist.

William Turner paid 60 pounds rent for the Hellidon Run of 25,600 acres, in 1853. He was later (1861), appointed magistrate for the district.

Richard Kettle (born in Whissendine, England in 1838), together with his family, were amongst the principle farming families to establish Helidon. Following a failed attempt to lease land in Tent Hill in 1871, Richard Kettle was granted 150 Lockyer acres, in 1873, improved to a Homestead in 1878, and a further 80 acres in 1882.

Helidon Post Office opened on 1 August 1866.

In 1874 settlers in the Helidon District wrote to the Board of General Education, which from 1860 was authorised to establish and administer primary schools, requesting that a school be established in Helidon. The Helidon State School opened on 11 May 1874 with 8 pupils. In 1882, the school had 24 students. Helidon State School was only the second school in the Lockyer Valley district and was the 52nd primary school opened in Queensland. The school's original building was on the east bank of Lockyer Creek at the intersection of Railway street and the Warrego highway; it was damaged in a cyclone and a new school erected at its current location in School Street in 1919.

In 1877, 8,000 acres (3,200 ha) were resumed from the Helidon pastoral run and offered for selection on 24 April 1877.

St John the Baptist Anglican Church was dedicated on 9 September 1923 by Archbishop Gerald Sharp, 40 years after it was first proposed to establish a church. It was constructed with volunteer labour. It closed circa 1989.

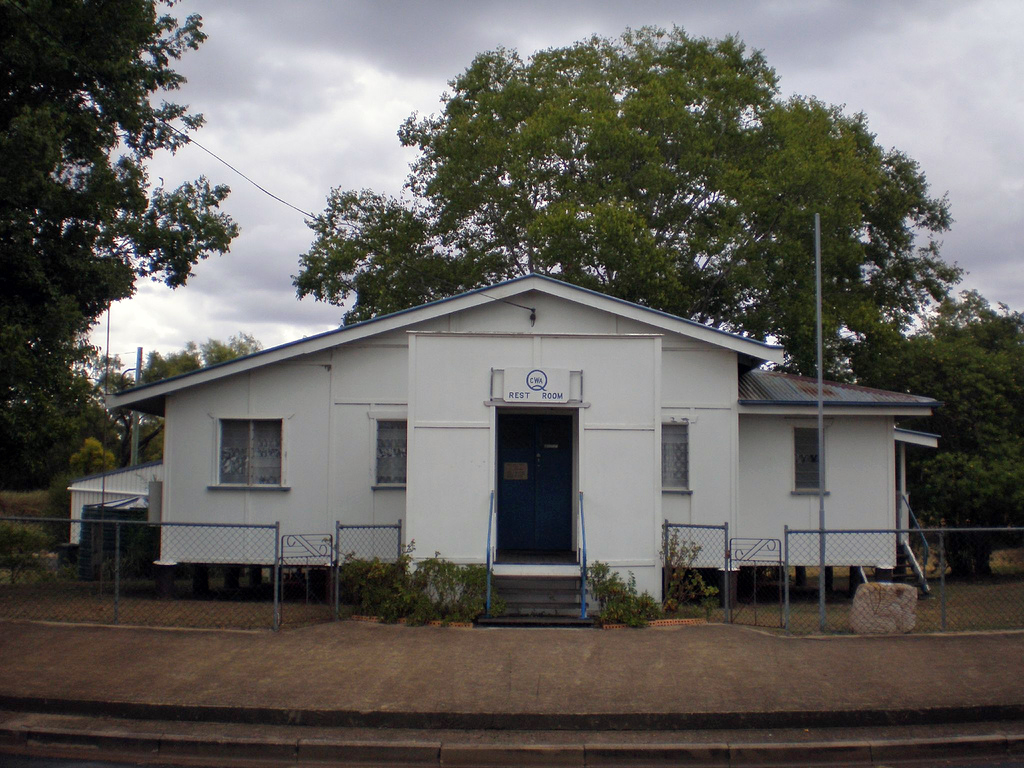
Helidon CWA Hall

In December 1924, a branch of the Country Women's Association was formed in nearby Gatton, and had a membership of 28 by 1925. The Helidon Branch was formed in 1933. The branch was active but in more recent times struggled with diminishing membership and in 2013 was under threat of closure. The branch closed and the closest branch to Helidon is now the Upper Lockyer/Withcott branch which meets in Withcott.

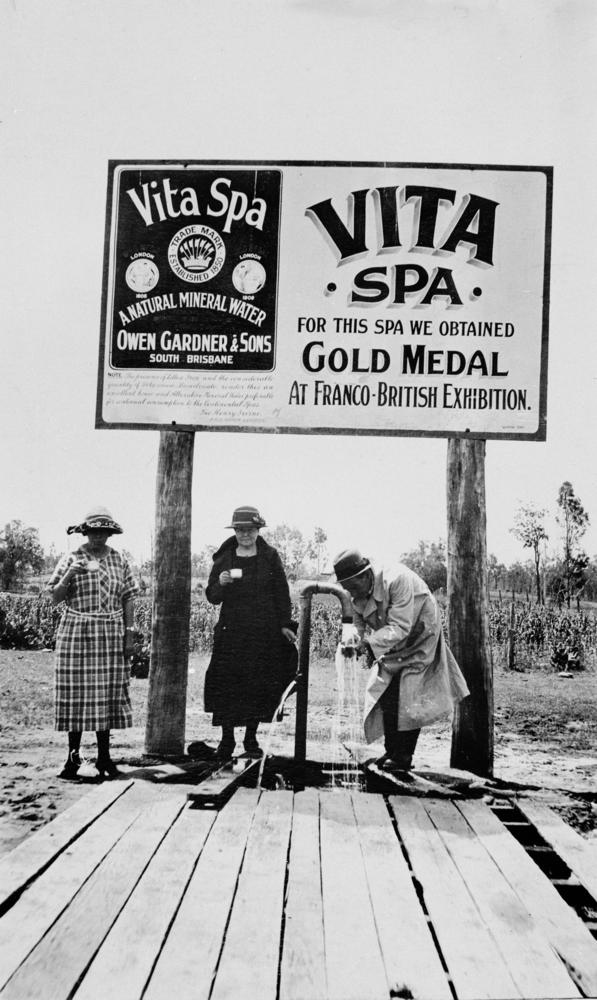
Two women and a man taking the waters at Helidon Spa, ca. 1918

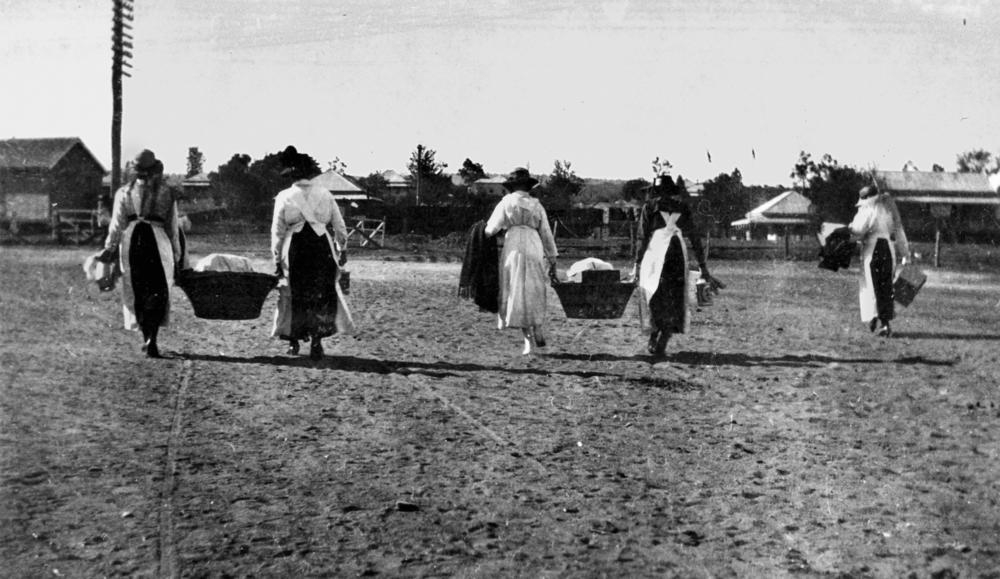
Women taking baskets of food to the troop train passing through Helidon, World War I

The Sisters of St Joseph came to Helidon in 1874 and opened St Joseph' School. A convent was built in 1884. The school closed in 1963.

In April 1914, a cyclonic storm swept through Helidon destroying the Catholic Church and severely damaging the convent, as well as many of the other buildings in the town – the Methodist Church, the school, post office and many businesses. St Joseph's Catholic Church was rebuilt and was opened on Sunday 27 September 1914 by Archbishop James Duhig.

The quality of the water at Helidon had long been known to the local indigenous population prior to colonisation, who believed the water had great healing and strength giving properties. They knew the spring water as "kowoor". These properties were thought to be the result of high lithium content, leading it to be sold and marketed as a powerful tonic for cleansing the bladder, kidneys and digestive system. In the 1820s, botanist and explorer Alan Cunningham became the first European to be introduced to Helidon's mineral waters. In 1879, chemist Reginald Larard was selling water from the spring as "Oogar Dang Water." The soda water was considered by a government analyst to be "a valuable discovery" and of a quality to "satisfy anyone of its immense superiority over all common soda water". By 1881 he had entered a partnership with Scottish sportsman and entrepreneur Gilbert E. Primrose, who had purchased the agricultural land around the springs, establishing the Helidon Spa Water Company. With the popularity of Helidon's spa water, the first 'spa park' was opened in 1926. To combat competition from imported soft drink products, the company would later merge with Owen Gardner & Sons in 1959 to become Kirks, now owned by Coca-Cola Amatil. During the 1960s, a large caravan park and pool were constructed, briefly earning the area the name 'Toowoomba's Gold Coast'. The area remained popular until the 1980s amid water safety concerns; however a few spa hotels still remain today.

On 10 January 2011 as part of the 2010–2011 Queensland floods, Helidon was hit by a wall of flood water caused by an extreme rain event in the Upper Lockyer Creeks and along the escarpment of the Toowoomba Range. Few houses were affected directly; those that were inundated sat directly on the creek bank, lower than the rest of the town. The main creek bank did not break, and the town was used as an evacuation centre for nearby Grantham.

== Demographics ==
In the 2016 census, the locality of Helidon had a population of 1,059 people. 84.3% of people were born in Australia and 89.9% of people spoke only English at home. The most common responses for religion were Catholic 23.2%, No Religion 22.0% and Anglican 15.2%.

In the 2021 census, the locality of Helidon had a population of 1,130 people.

== Heritage listings ==
Helidon has a number of heritage-listed sites, which are included in the Helidon Heritage Walk. The walk encompasses:

- 7 Railway Street: Bank of New South Wales Building
- Turner Street: named after Mr. William Turner, the first manager of 'Hellidon Run'.
- Phone exchange
- Helidon State School, established 1874
- McGovern Park
- Criterion Hotel, 1913.
- Tyson Park
- Pictorial Museum
- St. Joseph's Catholic Church
- War Memorial, erected 1978.
- Railway Station & Refreshment Rooms, 1867.
- Progress Park tennis club
- Helidon sewerage scheme
- Cunningham's Camp
- Post Office
- Police station
- Helidon Cemetery, first gazetted by the Land Administration Commission in the early 1890s, though the site had been being used before that date.

The Heritage Walk was supported by the Helidon & District Progress Association inc., Helidon State School, and Lockyer Valley Regional Council.

== Education ==
Helidon State School is a government primary (Prep–6) school for boys and girls at 16 School Street (27.5550°S 152.1257°E). In 2018, the school had an enrolment of 128 students with 10 teachers (8 full-time equivalent) and 10 non-teaching staff (6 full-time equivalent).

There are no secondary schools in Helidon. The nearest government secondary schools are Lockyer District State High School in Gatton to the east and Centenary Heights State High School in Centenary Heights, Toowoomba, to the west.
