= Lockyer National Park =

National park in Australia

- IUCN category II (national park)
- Location within Queensland
- Location: Queensland
- Nearest city: Gatton
- Coordinates: 27°28′58″S 152°13′01″E
- Area: 110.79 km^{2} (42.78 sq mi)
- Established: 2008
- Governing body: Queensland Parks and Wildlife Service
- Website: Official website

Lockyer National Park is a national park in north of the Lockyer Valley Region in South East Queensland, Australia. The landscape is dominated by the foothills of the Great Dividing Range and features sandstone gorges and eucalypt forest. There are four separate sections which form the Lockyer National Park. Alice Creek, Redbank Creek and Fifteen Mile Creek, all tributaries of Lockyer Creek, lie within the park. The park covers 11,079 ha with another 7,790 ha designated for recovery.

The park is home to significant plant and animal species such as the helidon ironbark, mountain guinea flower, brush-tailed rock-wallaby and black-breasted buttonquail.

== Access ==
There are several unsealed roads which provided access to the various sections. The main road into the park heads north from Helidon.

== Recreation ==
Lockyer National Park is popular with bushwalkers, mountain-bikers as well as motorbike and 4WD drivers. Authorities have targeted unlawful use of recreational vehicles in the park in an effort to reduce damage to the environment.

== Facilities ==
There are no formed tracks and camping is not permitted.

== See also ==
- Protected areas of Queensland
- Edmund Lockyer
