= Gatton, Queensland =

Gatton
- Town
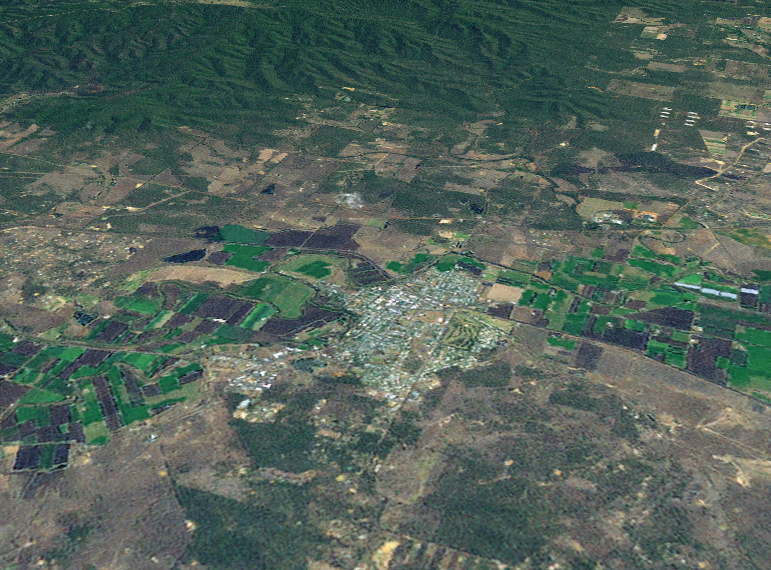
- A Landsat montage of Gatton township

- Interactive map of Gatton
- Coordinates: 27.5611°S 152.2755°E
- Country: Australia
- State: Queensland
- LGA: Lockyer Valley Region
- Location: 44.6 km (27.7 mi) E of Toowoomba; 54.4 km (33.8 mi) W of Ipswich; 93.5 km (58.1 mi) WSW of Brisbane
- Established: 1855

Government
  - State electorate: Lockyer
  - Federal division: Wright

Area
  - Total: 42.8 km^{2} (16.5 sq mi)
- Elevation: 94 m (308 ft)

Population
  - Total: 7,851 (2021 census)
  - Density: 183.43/km^{2} (475.1/sq mi)
- Time zone: UTC+10:00 (AEST)
- Postcode: 4343
- County: Churchill
- Parish: Gatton
- Mean max temp: 26.8 °C (80.2 °F)
- Mean min temp: 13.0 °C (55.4 °F)
- Annual rainfall: 768.6 mm (30.26 in)
Localities around Gatton
Ringwood	Adare	Lake Clarendon
Grantham; Placid Hills	Gatton	Lawes
Lower Tenthill	Woodlands	Glen Cairn

Gatton is a rural town and locality in the Lockyer Valley Region, Queensland, Australia. It is the administrative centre of the Lockyer Valley Region, situated in the Lockyer Valley of South East Queensland. In the 2021 census, the locality of Gatton had a population of 7,851 people.

== History ==
Jagara is one of the Aboriginal languages of South-East Queensland. There is some uncertainty over the status of Jagara as a language, dialect, or a group or clan within the local government boundaries of Ipswich City Council, Lockyer Regional Council and the Somerset Regional Council.

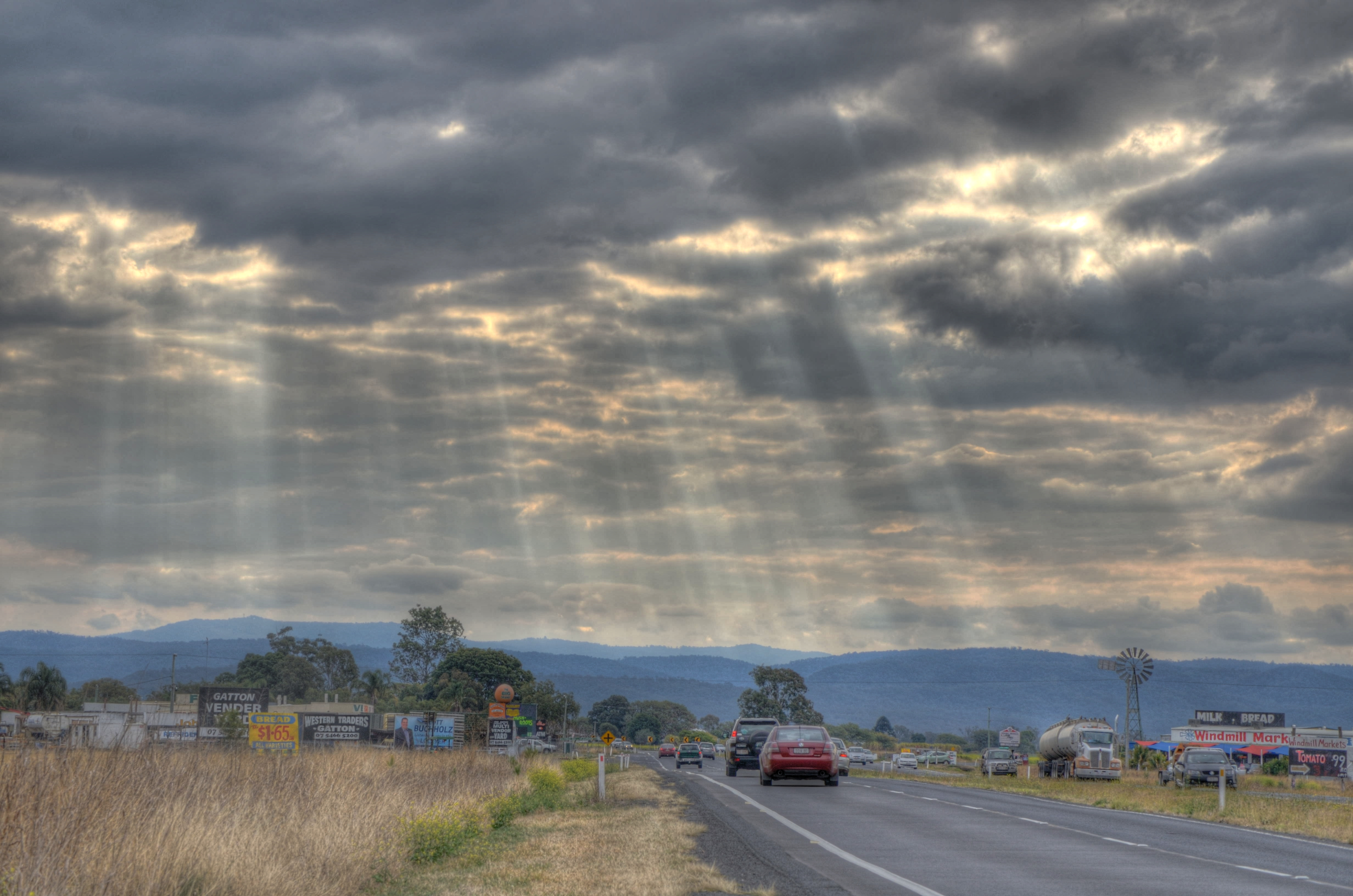
Warrego Highway leading into Gatton

The Gatton area was explored by Major Edmund Lockyer in 1825. A settlement known as Gatton was gazetted in 1855. The name Gatton is taken from the village of Gatton, Surrey, England.

The post office opened 1 January 1866, with Frederick Lloyd, a dairyman, as the first postmaster. The small village did not experience significant growth until the mid-1870s, after the railway to Grandchester attracted people to the area.

Catholic priest Father Brun established St Mary's School in 1868. However, in 1892, the only teacher at the school Miss Mary O'Keeffe married James McKeen of Mount Sylvia, and the school closed.

The Gatton Congregational Church opened on 26 November 1874. On 14 October 1901 the laying of the foundation blocks of present church was performed by William Drayton Armstrong, the Member of the Queensland Legislative Assembly for Lockyer, together with Alexander Brown Wilson, the architect from Brisbane representing the Queensland Congregational Union. In 1965 the front of the church was covered with bricks. In June 1977 many Congregational, Methodist and Presbyterian churches amalgamated to form the Uniting Church in Australia with the church in Gatton now known as Lockyer Uniting Church.

In January 1875, Gatton residents convened a meeting to establish a school. In June 1875 tenders were called for the construction of a school building and a teacher's residence. Gatton State School opened on 31 January 1876.

In October 1885, local Anglicans proposed to build a church. In April 1886, the tender of Mr J. Olsen to construct the church for £260 was accepted.

St Mary's Catholic Church was built in 1889 under Father Daniel Walsh, replacing an earlier church. On 29 September 1889, the church was officially opened and dedicated by the Archbishop of Brisbane Robert Dunne. The current church building was officially opened and blessed by Archbishop James Duhig on Sunday 25 August 1963.

The Queensland Agricultural College opened and established an experimental farm in 1897 at Gatton.

In December 1898, three local young people from nearby Blackfellow's Creek were murdered; this incident became known as the Gatton murders, and remains unsolved.

On 20 December 1902, auctioneer Elias Harding offered 36 town lots ranging in size between 0.25 to 0.5 acres (0.10 to 0.20 ha) in the Gaul Estate, being based around Gaul Street (27.5544°S 152.2803°E) and bounded by Old College Road to the north, Allan Street to the east, Hickey Street to the south and Park Lane to the west. Only 3 lots were sold.

In 1913, following local agitation, Gatton State School was expanded to offer secondary schooling, which was known by a number of names over the years: Gatton Secondary Department, Lockyer State High School, Gatton Intermediate School, and Gatton State School Secondary Department. On 23 January 1961, it was replaced by a completely new school, Lockyer District State High School.

Our Lady of Good Counsel School was opened on 14 January 1917 by the Sisters of Mercy, following a fund raising campaign by Roman Catholic Archbishop of Brisbane James Duhig.

The Gatton Baptist Church was officially formed in October 1935, an offshoot of the Tenthill Baptist Church. The congregation met in the Fallen Soldiers Memorial Hall, until 13 November 1937 when their first church was dedicated by Reverend John Henry Latimer, President of the Queensland Baptist Union. The building was the top of the hill on Railway Terrace (now 75-77 Cochrane Street, 27.5611°S 152.2762°E). It was a timber building, 30 by 24 feet (9.1 by 7.3 m) and cost £300 with most of timber and labour being donated. On 12 March 2005 the congregation relocated to their new church at 12 William Street.

The Gatton Corps of the Salvation Army was established in March 1938. The Gatton Circle Corps officially opened their church on the 23 February 1974 with Colonel R. Holz officiating; it was the former Methodist Church on the corner of Old College Road and Ford Street which was sold in January 1974 for $23,500.

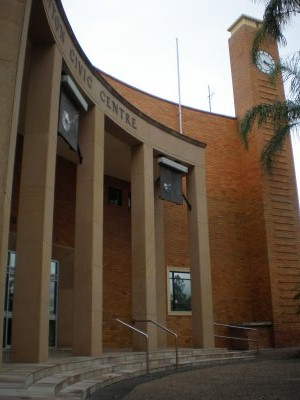
Gatton Civic Centre

St Paul's Lutheran Church opened on the corner of Spencer Street and East Street on 2 February 1948. It was replaced by the Peace Lutheran Church which opened on 16 April 1978.

St Mark's Lutheran Evangelical Church was dedicated by Pastor Carl Adolf Gerhard Dohler on Sunday 29 October 1950 with over 500 people in attendance. The building was at the top of Railway Street, where it had "a fine view of the town". It was constructed of cypress pine chamferboard and was 57 by 25 feet (17.4 by 7.6 m). In 1967 the church was relocated to 5 Hunter Street, Brassall, where it was rededicated on 19 November 1967.

The Gatton Star is a free, local, community newspaper which began publishing in 1956. The final print edition of The Gatton Star was published on 24 June 2020, when it transitioned to a subscription-based online only model.

Edna Linning and her husband started Gatton Bus Services in 1957 when they heard a high school was being built in town. Originally, the business only had one bus traveling to the college and back; since the mid-1980s, the business has 14 buses, eight of which are used for school children. The buses traveled to Flagstone Creek, Buaraba, Esk, and Forest Hill to pick-up students. The company also organised tours of Gatton for schoolchildren who lived in the city, so they could understand farm life and see how produce is grown and harvested. In its early days the business also ran tours to Brisbane.

Peace Lutheran Primary School opened on 27 January 1982. In October 2003 a new section of the Warrego Highway opened bypasasing Gatton.

In 2009, Gatton Library relocated from the Civic Centre in Railway Street to the new Cultural Centre.

== Demographics ==
In the 2006 census, the locality of Gatton had a population of 6,869 people.

In the 2016 census, the locality of Gatton had a population of 7,101 people. Aboriginal and Torres Strait Islander people made up 3.3% of the population. 68.3% of people were born in Australia. The next most common countries of birth were Taiwan 4.4%, India 2.2% and South Korea 1.8%. 72.6% of people spoke only English at home. Other languages spoken at home included Mandarin 5.3%, Arabic 2.0% and Korean 1.7%. The most common responses for religion were No Religion 22.6%, Catholic 20.7% and Anglican 11.7%.

In the 2021 census, the locality of Gatton had a population of 7,851 people.

== Heritage listings ==
Gatton has a number of heritage-listed sites, including:

- Boer War Memorial, Crescent Street
- Weeping Mother Memorial, Hickey Street
- University of Queensland Gatton Campus, Warrego Highway, Lawes (east of Gatton)

== Economy ==
As part of the ‘Salad Bowl’ of the Lockyer Valley, the area is primarily agricultural, with vegetables making up the majority of crops. Fruit was grown extensively in the area until the 1990s, when economic conditions changed and many of the orchards were removed. There is also significant beef and dairy cattle farming, (Stanbroke Beef operates its abattoir at nearby Grantham) along with a growing equine industry, and the town is also a noted producer of fodder crops, particularly prime lucerne hay.

== Climate ==
The area has a humid subtropical climate, with hot, humid summers and mild, sunny winters, albeit with cool nights. Heavy summer rain and warm conditions have provided ideal conditions for the areas agricultural productivity, although droughts and heatwaves can be problematic at times. Temperatures in Gatton are among the warmest in south-east Queensland in summer due to its position away from the coast but at low elevation in the Brisbane Valley.

Climate data for Gatton (27º32'24"S, 152º20'24"E, 89 m AMSL) (1913–2024 normals, 1965–2024 extremes, rainfall 1897–2024)
Month	Jan	Feb	Mar	Apr	May	Jun	Jul	Aug	Sep	Oct	Nov	Dec	Year
Record high °C (°F)	44.5 (112.1)	45.7 (114.3)	41.1 (106.0)	37.4 (99.3)	33.7 (92.7)	31.5 (88.7)	29.0 (84.2)	37.9 (100.2)	39.5 (103.1)	41.6 (106.9)	42.8 (109.0)	43.5 (110.3)	45.7 (114.3)
Mean daily maximum °C (°F)	31.7 (89.1)	30.8 (87.4)	29.6 (85.3)	27.2 (81.0)	23.8 (74.8)	21.1 (70.0)	20.8 (69.4)	22.5 (72.5)	25.7 (78.3)	28.2 (82.8)	30.2 (86.4)	31.4 (88.5)	26.9 (80.5)
Mean daily minimum °C (°F)	19.1 (66.4)	19.0 (66.2)	17.4 (63.3)	13.7 (56.7)	10.1 (50.2)	7.6 (45.7)	6.3 (43.3)	6.7 (44.1)	9.5 (49.1)	13.2 (55.8)	16.0 (60.8)	18.1 (64.6)	13.1 (55.5)
Record low °C (°F)	11.9 (53.4)	8.3 (46.9)	6.7 (44.1)	3.2 (37.8)	−0.2 (31.6)	−2.4 (27.7)	−5.6 (21.9)	−1.9 (28.6)	0.0 (32.0)	4.3 (39.7)	6.3 (43.3)	8.8 (47.8)	−5.6 (21.9)
Average precipitation mm (inches)	109.7 (4.32)	98.6 (3.88)	79.1 (3.11)	48.1 (1.89)	44.8 (1.76)	40.6 (1.60)	36.5 (1.44)	26.2 (1.03)	34.7 (1.37)	65.3 (2.57)	77.7 (3.06)	98.5 (3.88)	759.3 (29.89)
Average precipitation days (≥ 1.0 mm)	8.0	7.6	7.3	4.8	4.5	4.0	3.8	3.6	4.0	6.1	6.6	7.9	68.2
Source: Bureau of Meteorology (1913–2024 normals, 1965–2024 extremes, rainfall 1897–2024)

== Education ==
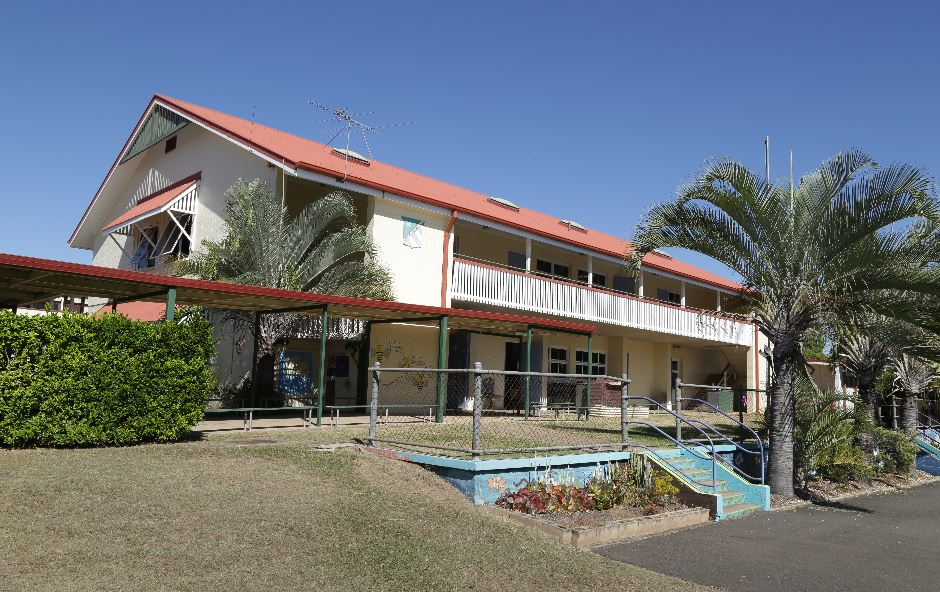
Gatton State School, 2024

Gatton State School is a government primary (Early Childhood to Year 6) co-ed school at 26 William Street (27.5601°S 152.2783°E). In 2017, the school had an enrolment of 506 students with 44 teachers (40 full-time equivalent) and 34 non-teaching staff (21 full-time equivalent). It includes a special education program.

Our Lady of Good Counsel School is a Catholic primary (Prep–6) co-ed school at 20 Maitland Street (27.5582°S 152.2716°E). In 2017, the school had an enrolment of 316 students with 23 teachers (20 full-time equivalent) and 16 non-teaching staff (10 full-time equivalent).

Peace Lutheran Primary School is a private primary (Prep–6) co-ed school at 36 East Street (27.5575°S 152.2743°E). In 2017, the school had an enrolment of 262 students with 22 teachers (20 full-time equivalent) and 15 non-teaching staff (10 full-time equivalent).

Lockyer District State High School is a government secondary (7–12) co-ed at 100 William Street (27.5669°S 152.2769°E). In 2017, the school had an enrolment of 1,048 students with 95 teachers (91 full-time equivalent) and 51 non-teaching staff (37 full-time equivalent). It includes a special education program.

The University of Queensland has a campus on the former Queensland Agricultural College site at Lawes, just to the east of the town of Gatton. This Gatton campus is now the base for much of the university's rural-focused research and teaching.

== Amenities ==
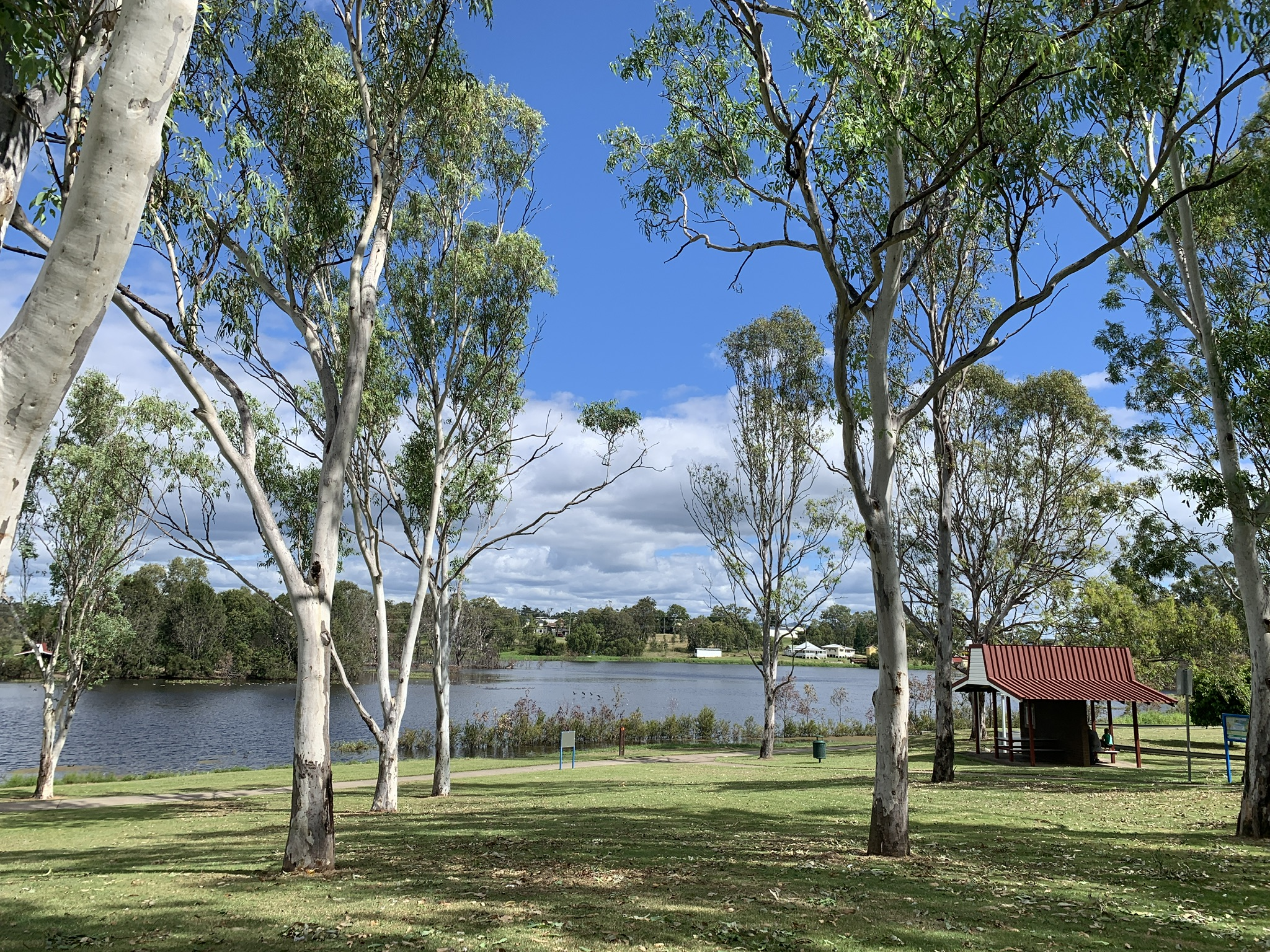
Lake Apex Park, behind the Lockyer Valley Cultural Centre, 2022

The Lockyer Valley Regional Council operate a public library in the Lockyer Valley Cultural Centre at 34 Lake Apex Drive (27.5696°S 152.2698°E).

Peace Lutheran Church is at 85 Spencer Street (27.5582°S 152.2747°E). It is adjacent to the Peace Lutheran Primary School.

Gatton Church of Christ is at 39 Hickey Street (27.5555°S 152.2815°E).

Gatton Baptist Church is at 12 William Street (27.5573°S 152.2799°E).

St Alban's Anglican Church is at 104 Spencer Street (corner of Railway Avenue, 27.5591°S 152.2765°E).

St Mary's Catholic Church is at 15 Maitland Street (corner of Spencer Street, 27.5572°S 152.2715°E).

Lockyer Uniting Church is at 25 Maitland Street (corner of Spencer Street, 27.5578°S 152.2714°E).

The Lockyer Valley Corps of the Salvation Army is at 64 Old College Road (corner of Ford Street, 27.5540°S 152.2842°E).

== Memorials ==
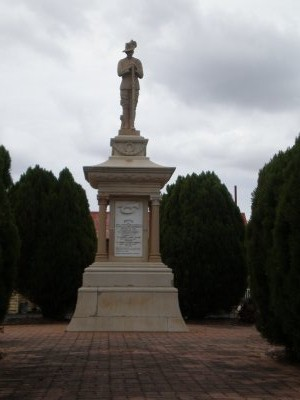
Boer war memorial, Gatton

The town has a number of war memorials:

- The Boer War Memorial was dedicated on 3 August 1908.
- The Weeping Mother Memorial is an unusual depiction of the role of women in war. The foundation stone was laid on 22 April 1922 by the Australian Attorney-General, Littleton Groom and was unveiled on 14 November 1922 by Queensland Governor, Matthew Nathan.
- The Gatton Shire War Memorial Pool was dedicated on 1 December 1959 to commemorate those who served in war.
- The National Servicemen's Memorial was erected in November 1996 and commemorates those that served during the national service period of 1951 to 1972.
- The Gatton Agricultural College War Memorial was dedicated on 25 April 1997 to commemorate the staff and students who died in war during the college's first century.
- The Lone Pine Memorial is a tree planted from seeds whose lineage can be traced back to the Lone Pine at Gallipoli. It was dedicated on 19 May 2005. Another Lone Pine Memorial at Gatton Campus also traces its lineage back to Gallipoli.

The Lights on the Hill Truck and Coach Drivers' Memorial is located at Lake Apex Park on the outskirts of Gatton.

== Attractions ==
Gatton Historical Village is on Freemans Road (27.5724°S 152.2665°E). It is operated by the Gatton & District Historical Society.

Queensland Transport Museum is within the Lockyer Valley Cultural Centre at 34 Apex Park Drive (27.5696°S 152.2696°E). It has vintage vehicles and models on display.
