= Nevilton, Queensland =

Nevilton
- Suburb
- Interactive map of Nevilton
- Coordinates: 27.8819°S 151.9677°E
- Country: Australia
- State: Queensland
- LGA: Toowoomba Region
- Location: 12.5 km (7.8 mi) NE of Clifton; 41.6 km (25.8 mi) S of Toowoomba CBD; 177 km (110 mi) WSW of Brisbane

Government
  - State electorate: Condamine
  - Federal division: Maranoa

Area
  - Total: 11.9 km^{2} (4.6 sq mi)

Population
  - Total: 25 (2021 census)
  - Density: 2.10/km^{2} (5.44/sq mi)
- Time zone: UTC+10:00 (AEST)
- Postcode: 4361
Suburbs around Nevilton
Nobby	Manapouri	Manapouri
Kings Creek	Nevilton	Headington Hill
Missen Flat	Missen Flat	Missen Flat

Nevilton is a rural locality in the Toowoomba Region, Queensland, Australia. In the 2021 census, Nevilton had a population of 25 people.

== Geography ==
Kings Creek forms the north-western boundary of the locality. There is one peak in the north of the locality also called Nevilton (27.8771°S 151.9770°E), rising to 556 metres (1,824 ft) above sea level.

The New England Highway enters the locality from the north-west (Nobby) and exits to the south (Missen Flat).

The land use is predominantly crop growing with some grazing on native vegetation and on planted pastures.

== History ==
The locality is believed to be named after the Neville family of Kenimore Farm in the district. William Neville operated the postal receiving office when it opened in 1901.

Headington Hill Provisional School opened on 11 May 1903. On 1 January 1909, it became Headington Hill State School. In 1910, it was renamed Nevilton State School. It closed in 1921, but reopened circa 1936. It closed permanently in 1958. It was at 15785 New England Highway (27.88505°S 151.97158°E). There is sign by the roadside indicating the site.

== Demographics ==
In the 2016 census, Nevilton had a population of 33 people.

In the 2021 census, Nevilton had a population of 25 people.

== Education ==
There are no schools in Nevilton. The nearest government primary schools are Nobby State School in neighbouring Nobby to the north-west and Pilton State School in Pilton to the north-east. The nearest government secondary school is Clifton State High School in Clifton to the south-west. There is also a Catholic primary school in Clifton.
