= Nobby, Queensland =

Nobby
- Town
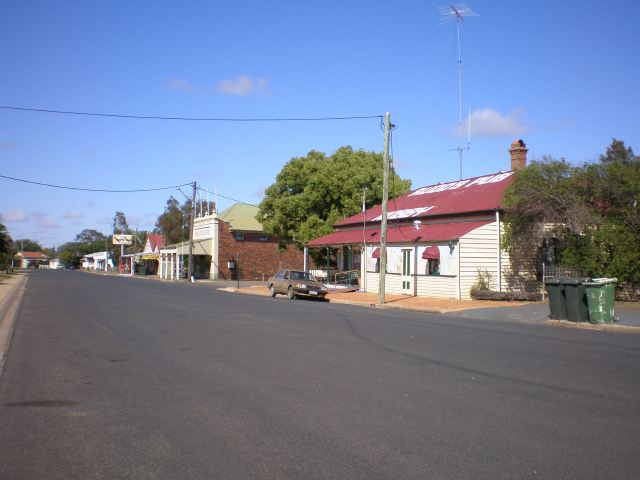
- Main street

- Interactive map of Nobby
- Coordinates: 27.8547°S 151.9005°E
- Country: Australia
- State: Queensland
- LGA: Toowoomba Region
- Location: 8.4 km (5.2 mi) N of Clifton; 38.1 km (23.7 mi) SSW of Toowoomba CBD; 163 km (101 mi) WSW of Brisbane

Government
  - State electorate: Condamine
  - Federal divisions: Groom; Maranoa

Area
  - Total: 90.9 km^{2} (35.1 sq mi)

Population
  - Total: 609 (2021 census)
  - Density: 6.700/km^{2} (17.352/sq mi)
- Time zone: UTC+10:00 (AEST)
- Postcode: 4360
Localities around Nobby
| Felton | Greenmount | East Greenmount |
| Felton | Nobby | Ascot; Manapouri |
| Back Plains | Mount Molar; Kings Creek | Nevilton |

Nobby is a rural town and locality on the Darling Downs in the Toowoomba Region, Queensland, Australia. It is located halfway between Toowoomba and Warwick. It is known for its association with Steele Rudd (author) and Elizabeth Kenny (treatment of polio using physiotherapy). In the 2021 census, the locality of Nobby had a population of 609 people.

== Geography ==
The Southern railway line passes through the locality but Nobby railway station is now abandoned (27.8519°S 151.9046°E).

The New England Highway enters the locality from the north-east (East Greenmount) and then proceeds south through the locality exiting to the south-east (Nevilton).

Nobby has the following mountains:

- Kent (27.8647°S 151.8207°E) 624 metres (2,047 ft)
- Mount Kent (27.8317°S 151.8381°E) 625 metres (2,051 ft)
- Rocky Point (27.8214°S 151.9026°E) 609 metres (1,998 ft)

== History ==
The origin of the name Nobby is unknown. When the Western railway line from Toowoomba to Warwick was being constructed, a worker's camp known as McDonald's Camp was established in the area in 1868 and this gave its name to the general area. However, the railway siding created was known as Nobby's Siding and the area become known as Nobby. However, the township that was surveyed alongside the railway in 1891 was named Davenport after George Davenport, a former local Member of the Queensland Legislative Assembly for Drayton and Toowoomba whose pastoral run was at nearby Headington Hill. However, the Railway Department refused to rename the railway station, which created confusion having the railway station and the town with different names, leading to many people continuing to refer to the town as Nobby. Eventually the town's name was officially changed back to Nobby in 1931.

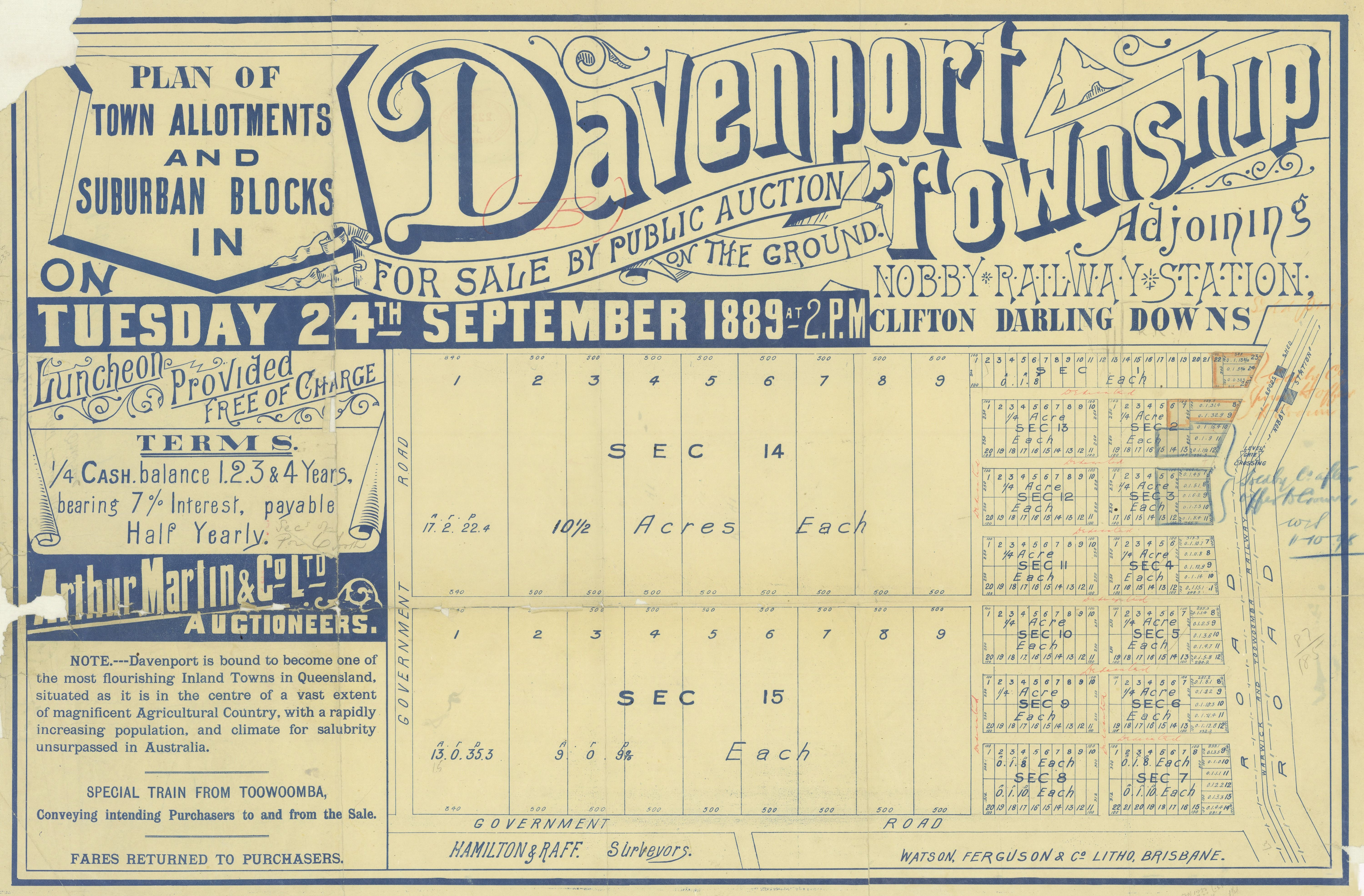
Davenport Township land sale map 1889

On 24 September 1889, Arthur Martin & Co auctioned 258 town allotments under the name Davenport Township. These blocks were located on south west side of Nobby railway station.

Nobby's Siding Post Office opened by March 1894 (a receiving office had been open from 1885). It was renamed Nobby's by 1902 and simply Nobby by 1908.

Mount Kent State School opened on 14 May 1883 and closed in 1959. It was on Ted Mengel Road, now within the locality of Felton (27.8446°S 151.8292°E).

Nobby Provisional School opened on 15 November 1897, becoming Nobby State School on 1 January 1909. It closed in 1921 and a new school Nobby Township State School opened on 30 January 1922, which was later renamed Nobby State School. The school celebrated its 125th anniversary on Saturday 12 November 2022.

Rockfield Provisional School opened on 23 October 1905. On 1 January 1909, it became Rockfield State School. It closed circa 1928. It was at 349 Mount Kent Boundary Road (corner Denton Road, 27.8387°S 151.8758°E).

A School of Arts was opened in Nobby in 1909. The hall, along with an adjacent bank building, was completely destroyed by fire in July 1928 and was rebuilt in 1929.

Bellview State School opened on 2 February 1920. It closed in 1949.

The Nobby branch of the Queensland Country Women's Association was established in April 1925; its first president was Sister Elizabeth Kenny.

St Paul's Church of England in Back Plains was dedicated on 12 February 1892 by Archbishop of Brisbane William Webber. The last service was conducted on 8 August 1943. In 1953 the church building was relocated to Nobby where it was re-established as St Paul's Church of England. The last service at Nobby was conducted circa 11 May 1975. In 1979 the church building was relocated to 12 Jubb Street, Allora to become the Scots Presbyterian Church for those Presbyterians in the district who did not wish to become part of the Uniting Church of Australia. The church in Allora was dedicated on 26 July 1980 by Presbyterian Moderator Rt Rev F. White.

In November 1947 on the 50th anniversary of Nobby State School, a war memorial gate was officially unveiled in the school grounds.

== Demographics ==
In the 2006 census, the locality of Nobby had a population of 391 people.

In the 2011 census, the locality of Nobby had a population of 484 people.

In the 2016 census, the locality of Nobby had a population of 563 people.

In the 2021 census, the locality of Nobby had a population of 609 people.

== Heritage listings ==
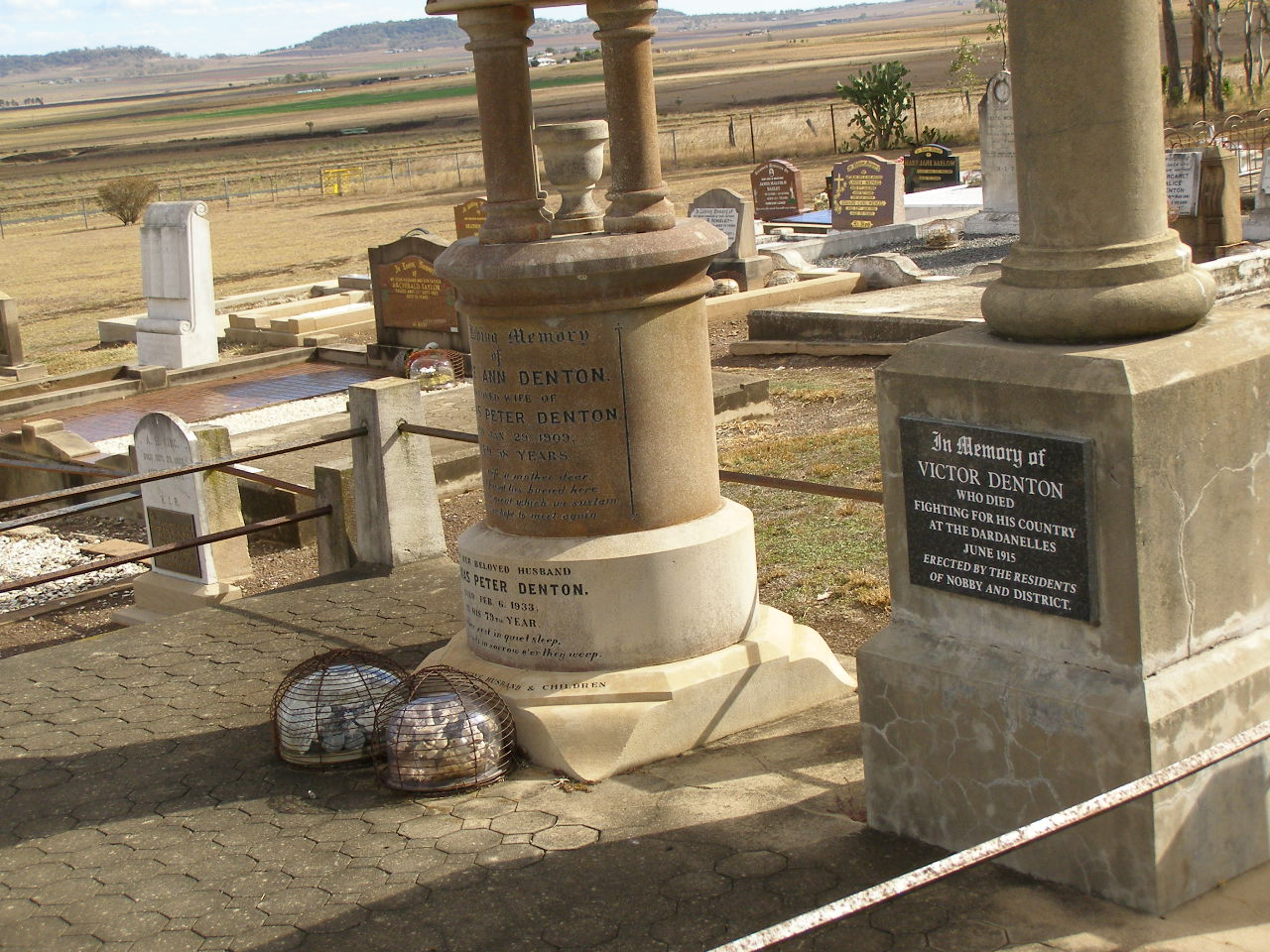
Victor Denton war memorial

Nobby has a number of heritage-listed sites, including:

- Victor Denton War Memorial, Nobby Cemetery (27.8487°S 151.8958°E)

== Education ==
Nobby State School is a government primary (Prep–6) school for boys and girls at 4 Davenport Street (27.8524°S 151.9060°E). In 2018, the school had an enrolment of 55 students with 4 teachers and 8 non-teaching staff (4 full-time equivalent).

There are no secondary schools in Nobby. The nearest government secondary school is Clifton State High School in Clifton to the south.

== Attractions ==
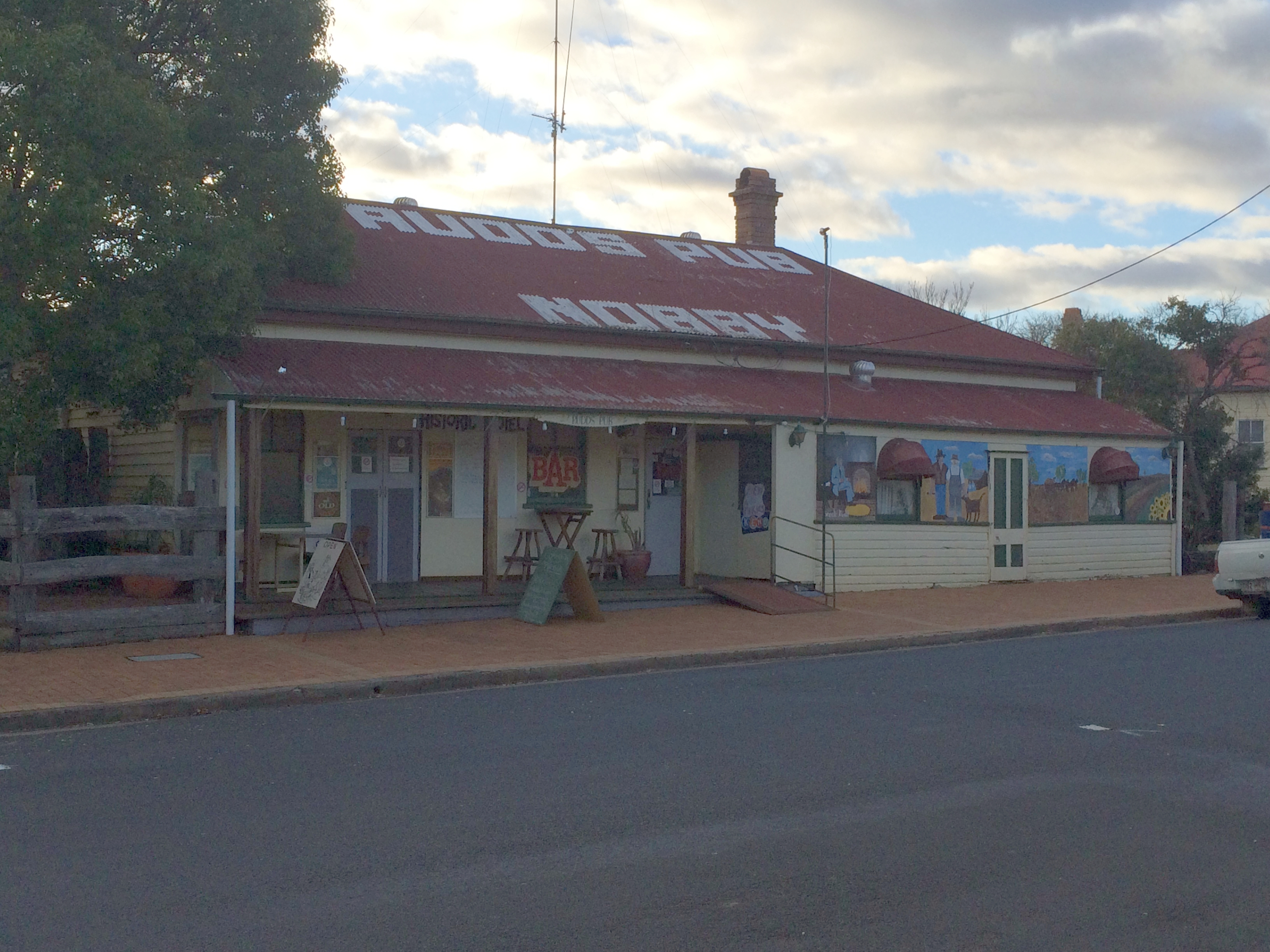
Rudd's Pub, Nobby, 2015

Rudd's Pub was originally built in 1893 across the road from the Nobby railway station as the Davenport Hotel; the architects were James Marks and Son. Based on local folklore that author Steele Rudd (who lived in Nobby) wrote some of his works in the pub, it was renamed Rudd's Pub in the 1980s.

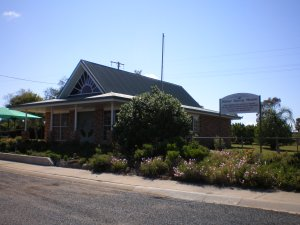
Sister Kenny House, Nobby

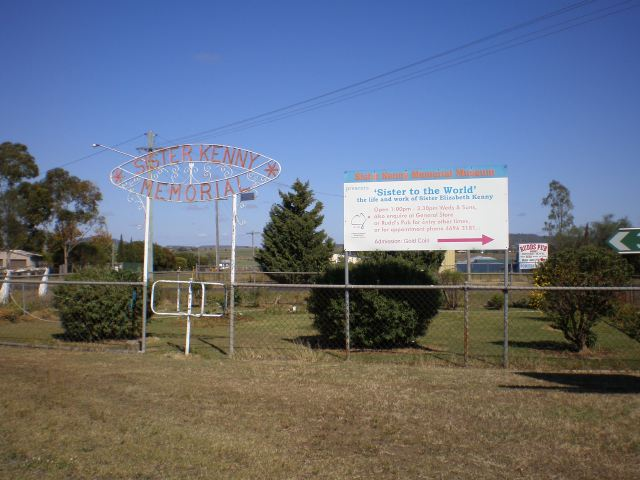
Sister Kenny Memorial

Sister Kenny House is a memorial to Sister Elizabeth Kenny who pioneered physiotherapy as a treatment for polio. This small museum holds artefacts relating to her life and therapies.

== Notable people ==
It is noted for having been home to two eminent Australians:

- Steele Rudd, author of the On Our Selection series of books
- Sister Elizabeth Kenny, who pioneered the use of physiotherapy in treating polio
