= Spring Creek, Queensland (Darling Downs) =

Spring Creek
- Suburb
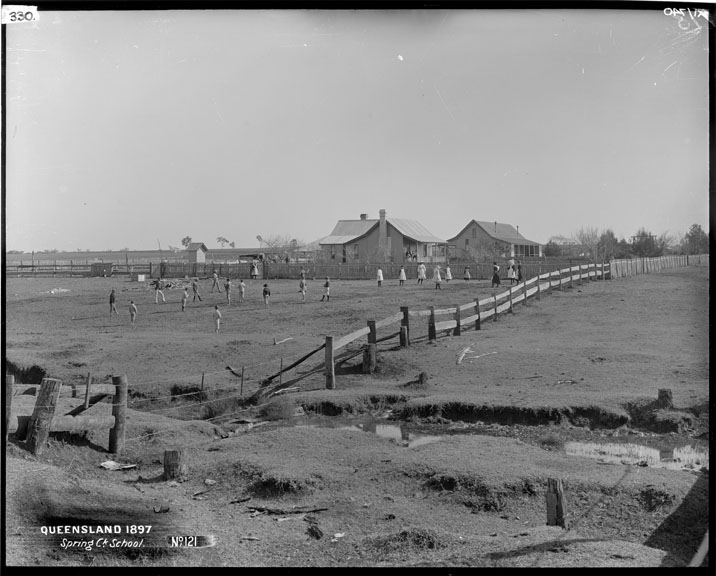
- Spring Creek State School, 1897

- Interactive map of Spring Creek
- Coordinates: 27.9566°S 151.9844°E
- Country: Australia
- State: Queensland
- LGAs: Toowoomba Region; Southern Downs Region
- Location: 54.6 km (33.9 mi) S of Toowoomba CBD; 161 km (100 mi) SW of Brisbane

Government
  - State electorates: Condamine; Southern Downs
  - Federal division: Maranoa

Area
  - Total: 71.8 km^{2} (27.7 sq mi)

Population
  - Total: 195 (2021 census)
  - Density: 2.716/km^{2} (7.034/sq mi)
- Time zone: UTC+10:00 (AEST)
- Postcode: 4361
Suburbs around Spring Creek
Headington Hill	Headington Hill	Upper Pilton
Clifton	Spring Creek	Upper Pilton
Elphinstone	Allora	Forest Springs

Spring Creek is a rural locality split between the Toowoomba Region and the Southern Downs Region, Queensland, Australia. In the 2021 census, Spring Creek had a population of 195 people.

== Geography ==
The New England Highway runs through from north to south. Gatton–Clifton Road passes to the north-west.

The land use is predominantly cropping with some grazing on native vegetation.

== History ==
St Matthew's Anglican Church was dedicated on 8 March 1876 by Bishop Matthew Hale. It closed in 1969 through loss of its congregation to larger towns.

Spring Creek State School opened on 15 August 1871 and closed on 8 May 1954. It was located at 616 Spring Creek Road (27.9520°S 151.9920°E).

Stannum Provisional School opened on 16 August 1915. On 1 April 1920 it became Stannum State School. It closed circa 1924.

Spring Creek Upper State School opened in early 1915 at Mrs Hill's before a school building opened on 7 July 1915. It had a temporary closed from August 1950 to February 1952. It closed finally in 1970. It was located at 318 Doyle Road (27.96134°S 152.03890°E).

Table Top State School opened on 29 January 1952 and closed on 30 January 1963. Tabletop parish (27.95°S 152.00°E) is to the immediate north of Allora in the vicinity of the present day locality of Spring Creek.

== Demographics ==
In the 2011 census, Spring Creek had a population of 354 people.

In the 2016 census, Spring Creek had a population of 194 people.

In the 2021 census, Spring Creek had a population of 195 people.

== Education ==
There are no schools in Spring Creek. The nearest government primary schools are Clifton State School in neighbouring Clifton to the west, Allora State School in neighbouring Allora to the south, and Pilton State School in Pilton to the north. The nearest government secondary schools are Allora State School (to Year 10 only) in neighbouring Allora to the south and Clifton State High School (to Year 12) in neighbouring Clifton to the west.
