= Manapouri, Queensland =

Manapouri
- Suburb
- Interactive map of Manapouri
- Coordinates: 27.8652°S 151.9844°E
- Country: Australia
- State: Queensland
- LGA: Toowoomba Region
- Location: 19.0 km (11.8 mi) NE of Clifton; 43.8 km (27.2 mi) S of Toowoomba CBD; 48.1 km (29.9 mi) N of Warwick; 146 km (91 mi) WSW of Brisbane

Government
  - State electorate: Condamine
  - Federal divisions: Groom; Maranoa

Area
  - Total: 24.0 km^{2} (9.3 sq mi)

Population
  - Total: 47 (2021 census)
  - Density: 1.958/km^{2} (5.07/sq mi)
- Time zone: UTC+10:00 (AEST)
- Postcode: 4361
Suburbs around Manapouri
Ascot	Ascot	Ascot
Nobby	Manapouri	Pilton
Nevilton	Nevilton	Headington Hill

Manapouri is a rural locality in the Toowoomba Region, Queensland, Australia. In the 2021 census, Manapouri had a population of 47 people.

== Geography ==
Kings Creek forms the northern boundary of the locality. It is a tributary of the Condamine River.

The New England Highway forms part of the south-western boundary of the locality, entering from the west (Nobby) and exiting to the south-west (Nevilton).

The land use is predominantly dry and irrigated crop growing with a small amount of grazing on native vegetation.

== History ==
Manapouri State School (also written as Manipouri State School) opened circa 1923. In 1932, the school was being considered for closure along with other nearby schools, but appears to have remained in operation until it closed in September 1937 due to low student numbers, reopening by 1939. In 1946, the school reopened after a closure of a "number of years". It closed permanently circa 1952. The school was on a 2-acre (0.81 ha) site at 401 Carey Road (27.84724°S 152.00308°E). As at 2024, there is a sign on the roadside indicating the school's site.

== Demographics ==
In the 2016 census, Manapouri had a population of 52 people.

In the 2021 census, Manapouri had a population of 47 people.

== Education ==
The nearest government primary schools are Pilton State School in neighbouring Pilton to the east and Nobby State School in neighbouring Nobby to the west. The nearest government secondary school is Clifton State High School in Clifton to the south-west. There is also a Catholic primary school in Clifton.
