= Missen Flat, Queensland =

Missen Flat
- Suburb
- Interactive map of Missen Flat
- Coordinates: 27.9152°S 151.9844°E
- Country: Australia
- State: Queensland
- LGA: Toowoomba Region
- Location: 12.0 km (7.5 mi) NE of Clifton; 41.0 km (25.5 mi) N of Warwick; 43.2 km (26.8 mi) S of Toowoomba CBD; 154 km (96 mi) SW of Brisbane

Government
  - State electorate: Condamine
  - Federal division: Maranoa

Area
  - Total: 11.7 km^{2} (4.5 sq mi)

Population
  - Total: 21 (2021 census)
  - Density: 1.79/km^{2} (4.65/sq mi)
- Time zone: UTC+10:00 (AEST)
- Postcode: 4361
Suburbs around Missen Flat
Kings Creek	Nevilton	Nevilton
Kings Creek	Missen Flat	Headington Hill
Clifton	Clifton	Headington Hill

Missen Flat is a rural locality in the Toowoomba Region, Queensland, Australia. In the 2021 census, Missen Flat had a population of 21 people.

== Geography ==
The New England Highway enters the locality from the north (Nevilton) and exits to the south-east (Clifton / Headington Hill). The Gatton–Clifton Road (State Route 80) runs along the south-east boundary.

The land use is mostly crop growing with grazing on native vegetation.

== Demographics ==
In the 2016 census, Missen Flat had a population of 20 people.

In the 2021 census, Missen Flat had a population of 21 people.

== Education ==
There are no schools in Missen Flat. The nearest government primary schools are Clifton State School in neighbouring Clifton to the south-west and Pilton State School in Pilton to the north-east. The nearest government secondary school is Clifton State High School, also in Clifton. There is also a Catholic primary school in Clifton.
