= Hirstglen, Queensland =

Hirstglen
- Suburb
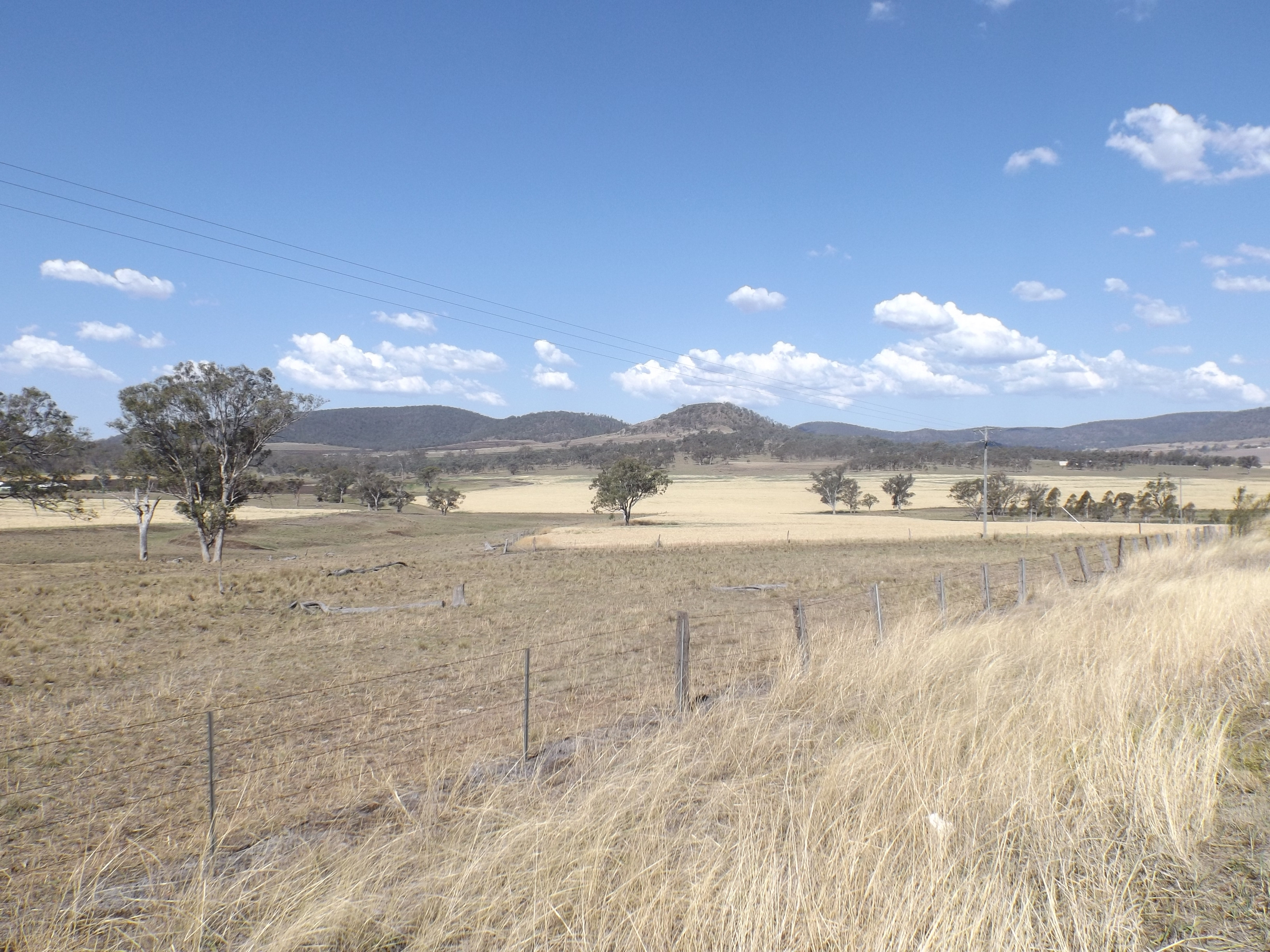
- Fields along Greenmount Hirstvale Road, 2014

- Interactive map of Hirstglen
- Coordinates: 27.8361°S 152.0855°E
- Country: Australia
- State: Queensland
- LGA: Toowoomba Region
- Location: 7.5 km (4.7 mi) NW of Pilton; 25.9 km (16.1 mi) NW of Clifton; 46.9 km (29.1 mi) SSE of Toowoomba CBD; 135 km (84 mi) WSW of Brisbane

Government
  - State electorate: Condamine
  - Federal division: Groom

Area
  - Total: 42.8 km^{2} (16.5 sq mi)
- Elevation: 490–850 m (1,610–2,790 ft)

Population
  - Total: 77 (2021 census)
  - Density: 1.799/km^{2} (4.66/sq mi)
- Time zone: UTC+10:00 (AEST)
- Postcode: 4359
Suburbs around Hirstglen
Budgee	West Haldon	Junction View
Ascot	Hirstglen	Black Duck Creek
Pilton	Pilton	Upper Pilton

Hirstglen is a rural locality in the Toowoomba Region on the Darling Downs, Queensland, Australia. In the 2021 census, Hirstglen had a population of 77 people.

== Geography ==
The northern and eastern boundary roughly follows the Great Dividing Range. The range separates the Murray-Darling drainage basin (including this location) from the Australian north-east coast drainage division which flows into the Coral Sea. Part of the southern boundary is marked by Kings Creek, a tributary of the Condamine River.

The Gatton–Clifton Road runs through from north to south, and the Greenmount-Hirstvale Road enters from the west.

The land use is a mixture of grazing on native vegetation and crop growing.

== History ==
Hirstglen State School opened on 6 May 1930 and closed on 22 February 1948. It was on the southern side of Hirstglen Road (approx 27.82772°S 152.10382°E).

== Demographics ==
In the 2016 census, Hirstglen had a population of 83 people.

In the 2021 census, Hirstglen had a population of 77 people.

== Education ==
There are no schools in Hirstglen. The nearest government primary school is Pilton State School in neighbouring Pilton to the south. The nearest government secondary school is Clifton State High School in Clifton to the south-west.
