= Budgee, Queensland =

Budgee
- Suburb
- Interactive map of Budgee
- Coordinates: 27.7819°S 152.0177°E
- Country: Australia
- State: Queensland
- LGA: Toowoomba Region
- Location: 26.1 km (16.2 mi) NE of Clifton; 35.8 km (22.2 mi) S of Toowoomba; 141 km (88 mi) WSW of Brisbane

Government
  - State electorate: Condamine
  - Federal division: Groom

Area
  - Total: 35.2 km^{2} (13.6 sq mi)
- Elevation: 470–730 m (1,540–2,400 ft)

Population
  - Total: 30 (2021 census)
  - Density: 0.85/km^{2} (2.2/sq mi)
- Time zone: UTC+10:00 (AEST)
- Postcode: 4359
Suburbs around Budgee
East Greenmount	Ramsay	West Haldon
East Greenmount	Budgee	West Haldon
Ascot	Ascot	Hirstglen

Budgee is a rural locality in the Toowoomba Region, Queensland, Australia. In the 2021 census, Budgee had a population of 30 people.

== Geography ==
The Main Range (part of the Great Dividing Range) loosely forms the northern and eastern boundaries of the locality. The elevation ranges from 470 to 730 metres (1,540 to 2,400 ft) with the higher elevations to the north and east of the locality and the lower elevations to the south of the locality.

The land use is crop growing in the lower elevations and grazing on native vegetation in the higher elevations.

== History ==
Budgee State School opened on 11 November 1913. In 1916, it became a half-time school with Hirstvale Provisional School (meaning they shared a single teacher). When the Hirstvale school closed in 1917, Budgee returned to full-time school status. In 1917, Hirstvale School closed and Budgee once again became a full-time school. The school closed on 23 February 1941 and reopened on 29 January 1952. It closed permanently on 24 January 1965. It was at 3 O'Rourke Road (27.79556°S 152.01440°E).

== Demographics ==
In the 2016 census, Budgee had a population of 35 people.

In the 2021 census, Budgee had a population of 30 people.

== Education ==
There are no schools in Budgee. The nearest government primary school is Emu Creek State School in neighbouring East Greenmount to the west. The nearest government secondary school is Clifton State High School in Clifton to the south-west.
