= Upper Pilton, Queensland =

Upper Pilton
- Suburb
- Interactive map of Upper Pilton
- Coordinates: 27.9044°S 152.1469°E
- Country: Australia
- State: Queensland
- LGAs: Toowoomba Region; Southern Downs Region
- Location: 21.3 km (13.2 mi) E of Clifton; 53.7 km (33.4 mi) SSE of Toowoomba CBD; 55.0 km (34.2 mi) N of Warwick; 150 km (93 mi) WSW of Brisbane

Government
  - State electorates: Condamine; Southern Downs
  - Federal division: Maranoa

Area
  - Total: 99.2 km^{2} (38.3 sq mi)
- Elevation: 520–995 m (1,706–3,264 ft)

Population
  - Total: 80 (2021 census)
  - Density: 0.81/km^{2} (2.09/sq mi)
- Time zone: UTC+10:00 (AEST)
- Postcode: 4361
Suburbs around Upper Pilton
Pilton	Hirstglen	Black Duck Creek
Headington Hill	Upper Pilton	Black Duck Creek
Spring Creek	Goomburra	Goomburra

Upper Pilton is a rural locality split between the Toowoomba Region and the Southern Downs Region, both in Queensland, Australia. In the 2021 census, Upper Pilton had a population of 80 people.

== Geography ==
Of the locality's 99.2 square kilometres (38.3 sq mi), 192.3 square kilometres (74.2 sq mi) are in the Toowoomba Region and 6.9 square kilometres (2.7 sq mi) in the south-west of the locality are in the Southern Downs Region.

The Main Range (part of the Great Dividing Range) bounds the locality to the east.

The land use is mostly grazing on native vegetation with some crop growing.

== History ==
The name Pilton is taken from Pilton pastoral run which was excised from the Clifton pastoral run in the 1840s. Lessees of the Pilton pastoral run included Philip Pinnock, John Gammie, Joseph King and Joshua J. Whitting.

Pilton Upper Provisional school opened in 1908. On 1 January 1909, it became Pilton Upper State School. It closed in 1963. It was on the eastern side of Pilton Valley Road (approx 27.91301°S 152.11136°E).

== Demographics ==
In the 2016 census, Upper Pilton had a population of 63 people.

In the 2021 census, Upper Pilton had a population of 80 people.

== Education ==
There are no schools in Upper Pilton. The nearest government primary schools are Pilton State School in neighbouring Pilton to the north-west and Freestone State School in Freestone to the south. The nearest government secondary schools are Clifton State High School (to Year 12) in Clifton to the west and Allora State School (to Year 10) in Allora to the south-west.
