= Kings Creek, Queensland =

Kings Creek
- Suburb
- Interactive map of Kings Creek
- Coordinates: 27.8819°S 151.9177°E
- Country: Australia
- State: Queensland
- LGA: Toowoomba Region
- Location: 5.0 km (3.1 mi) N of Clifton; 5.5 km (3.4 mi) S of Nobby; 42.7 km (26.5 mi) S of Toowoomba CBD; 165 km (103 mi) WSW of Brisbane

Government
  - State electorate: Condamine
  - Federal division: Maranoa

Area
  - Total: 35.1 km^{2} (13.6 sq mi)
- Elevation: 430–470 m (1,410–1,540 ft)

Population
  - Total: 55 (2021 census)
  - Density: 1.567/km^{2} (4.06/sq mi)
- Time zone: UTC+10:00 (AEST)
- Postcode: 4361
Suburbs around Kings Creek
Nobby	Nobby	Nevilton
Mount Molar	Kings Creek	Missen Flat
Ryeford	Clifton	Clifton

Kings Creek is a rural locality in the Toowoomba Region, Queensland, Australia. In the 2021 census, Kings Creek had a population of 55 people.

== Geography ==
The creek Kings Creek enters the locality from the north-east (Nobby / Nevilton) and flows south-west across the locality, exiting to the south-west (Ryeford / Clifton); it is a tributary of the Condamine River.

The Felton Clifton Road enters locality from the north (Nobby) and exits to the south (Clifton). The South Western railway line runs immediately east and parallel to the road. The district was once served by the now-closed Kings Creek railway station which was immediately north of the crossing of the line over the creek (27.90045°S 151.90824°E).

The land is relatively flat and the land use is predominantly crop growing with some grazing on native vegetation.

== History ==
The locality takes its name from the creek, which was named after pastoralist Joseph King of the Pilton and Clifton pastoral runs during the 1840s.

In September 1883, tenders are called for the erection of a provisional school in King's Creek. King's Creek Provisional School opened on 4 February 1884. In November 1900, it became King's Creek State School. It closed on 30 April 1931. It was on the eastern side of the road and railway (approx 27.89070°S 151.90825°E).

An undated map shows allotments for sale in the township of King's Creek (27.892°S 151.912°E), situated on the "Clifton Estate". The allotments were adjacent to the South-Western railway line, close to King's Creek railway station, and the watercourse King's Creek. In June 1885, all of the allotments at the new township of King's Creek were sold but there was limited interest in the farm sites outside the town as the prices were thought to be too high. The township failed to develop; that land is now used for farming.

In December 1906, a Methodist church was opened at Kings Creek.

Kings Creek has a history of fossil finds over the years. In 1936, a prehistoric jaw bone was found. In 2013, a late Pleistocene tooth was found in 2013 and attributed to Quinkana (an extinct species of crocodile). It was most similar to fragmentary teeth from Quinkana foritrostrum, but was not attributed to any species because of a lack of complete specimens.

== Demographics ==
In the 2016 census, Kings Creek had a population of 72 people.

In the 2021 census, Kings Creek had a population of 55 people.

== Education ==
There are no schools in Kings Creek. The nearest government primary schools are Nobby State School in neighbouring Nobby to the north and Clifton State School in neighbouring Clifton to the south. The nearest government secondary school is Clifton State High School, also in Clifton.
