= Ascot, Queensland (Toowoomba Region) =

Ascot
- Suburb
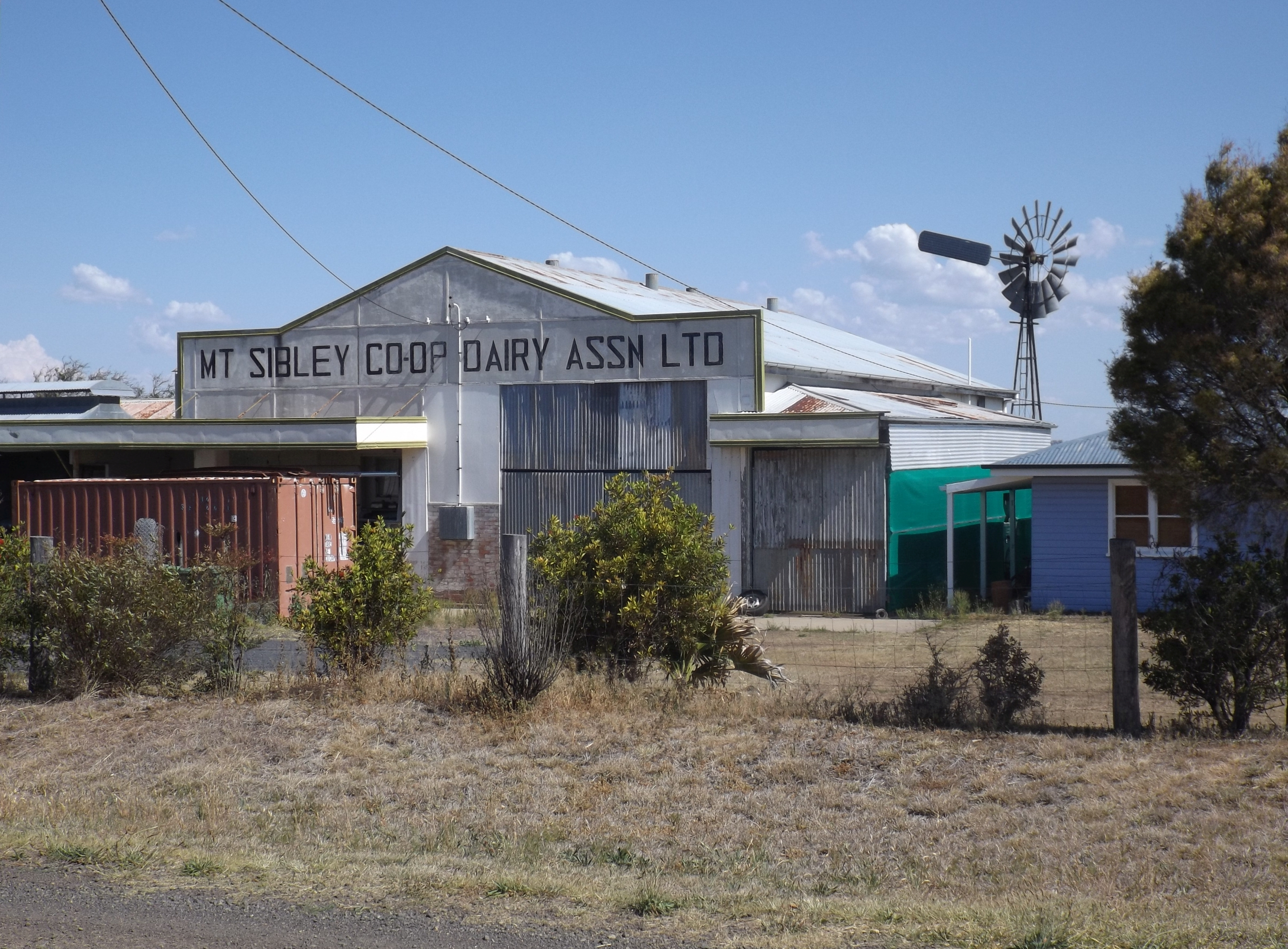
- Farm building at Ascot, 2014

- Interactive map of Ascot
- Coordinates: 27.8152°S 152.0011°E
- Country: Australia
- State: Queensland
- LGA: Toowoomba Region
- Location: 20.6 km (12.8 mi) NNE of Clifton; 33.3 km (20.7 mi) S of Toowoomba; 149 km (93 mi) WSW of Brisbane

Government
  - State electorate: Condamine
  - Federal division: Groom

Area
  - Total: 33.1 km^{2} (12.8 sq mi)

Population
  - Total: 106 (2021 census)
  - Density: 3.202/km^{2} (8.29/sq mi)
- Time zone: UTC+10:00 (AEST)
- Postcode: 4359
Suburbs around Ascot
East Greenmount	Budgee	Budgee
Nobby	Ascot	Hirstglen
Nobby	Manapouri	Pilton

Ascot is a rural locality in the Toowoomba Region, Queensland, Australia. In the 2021 census, Ascot had a population of 106 people.

== Geography ==
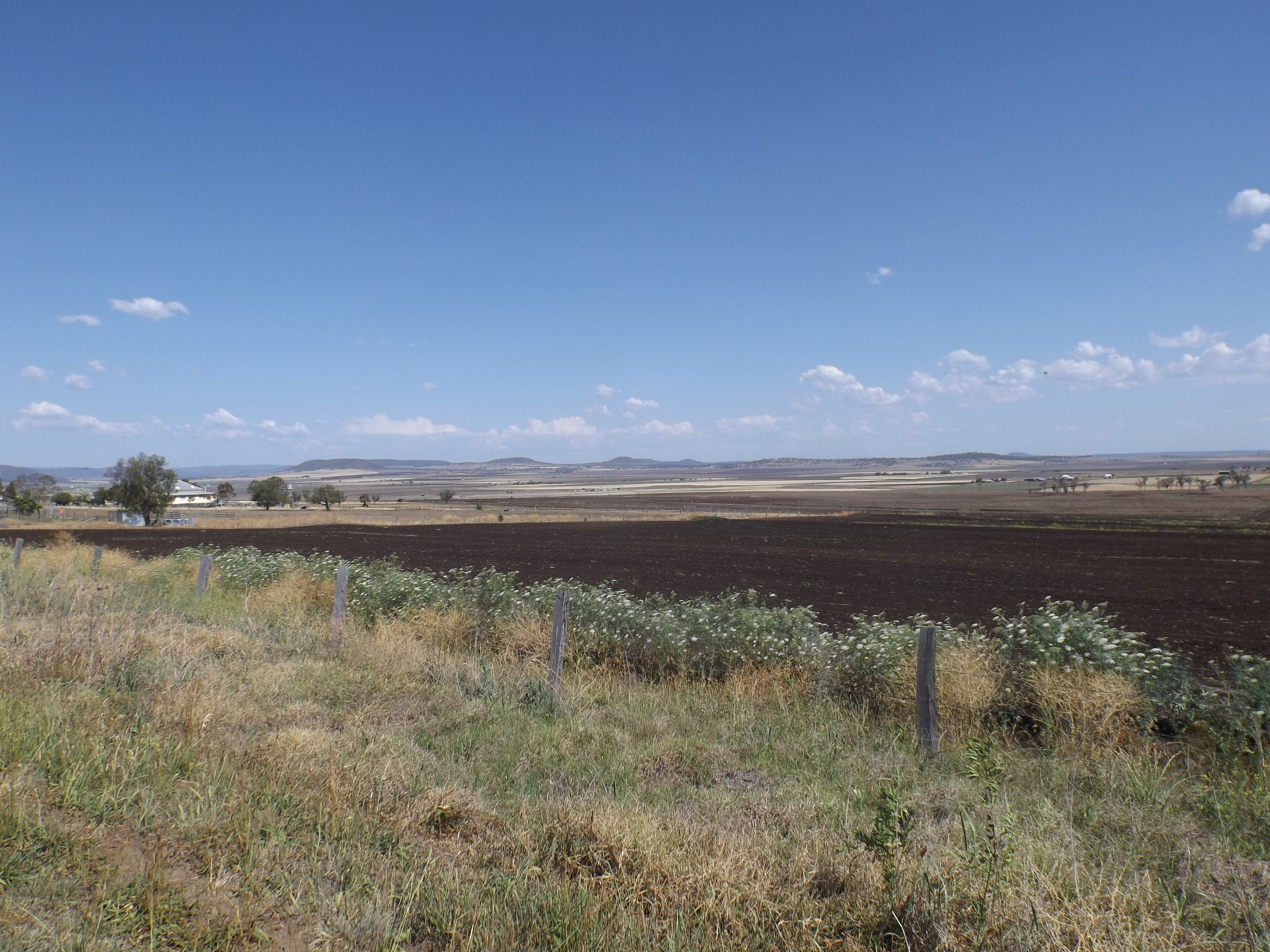
Farmlands along Greenmount Hirstvale Road, 2014

Ascot is on the Darling Downs. Its southern boundary follows Kings Creek, a tributary of the Condamine River. The area is heavily developed for agriculture except for elevated areas in the east.

Mount Sibley is a neighbourhood in the north-west of the locality (27.8333°S 151.9666°E), presumably taking its name from the nearby mountain of the same name in neighbouring East Greenmount. The mountain was named after James Sibley, a pastoralist and publican, who leased the Clifton pastoral run in the early 1840s.

== History ==
Mount Sibley Provisional School opened in 1907. On 1 January 1909 it became Mount Sibley State School. It closed circa 1952. The school was located at 565 Mount Silbley Road (27.8259°S 151.9634°E).

== Demographics ==
In the 2016 census, Ascot had a population of 31 people.

In the 2021 census, Ascot had a population of 106 people.

== Education ==
There are no schools in Ascot. The nearest government primary schools are Pilton State School in neighbouring Pilton to the south-east, Emu Creek State School in neighbouring East Greenmount to the north-west and Nobby State School in neighbouring Nobby to the south-west. The nearest government secondary school is Clifton State High School in Clifton to the south-west.
