= Headington Hill, Queensland =

Headington Hill
- Suburb
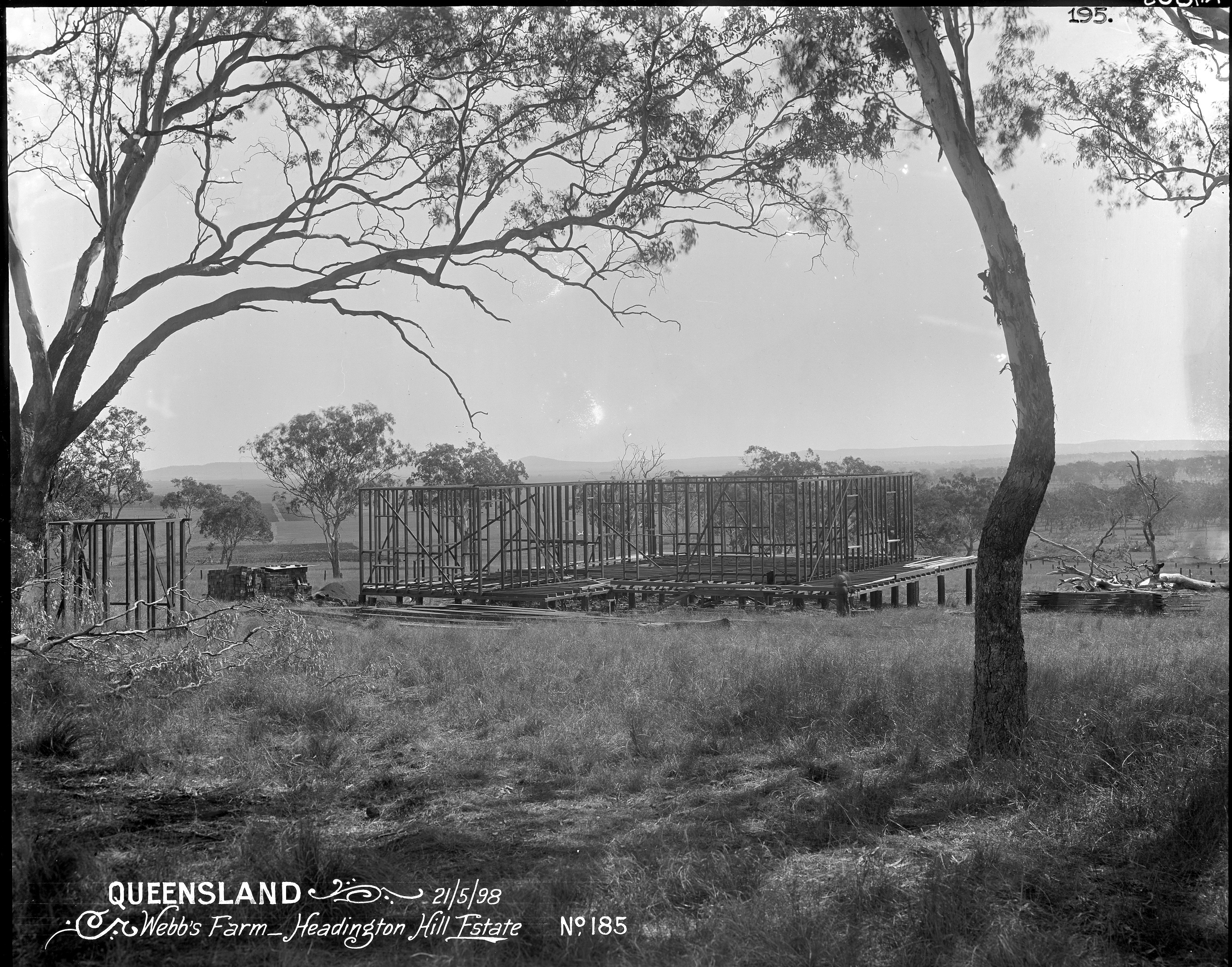
- Webb's Farm, Headington Hill Estate, 1898

- Interactive map of Headington Hill
- Coordinates: 27.9152°S 152.03°E
- Country: Australia
- State: Queensland
- LGA: Toowoomba Region
- Location: 12.1 km (7.5 mi) ENE of Clifton; 41.1 km (25.5 mi) N of Warwick; 49.0 km (30.4 mi) S of Toowoomba; 148 km (92 mi) WSW of Brisbane

Government
  - State electorate: Condamine
  - Federal division: Maranoa

Area
  - Total: 45.8 km^{2} (17.7 sq mi)

Population
  - Total: 87 (2021 census)
  - Density: 1.900/km^{2} (4.92/sq mi)
- Time zone: UTC+10:00 (AEST)
- Postcode: 4361
Suburbs around Headington Hill
Nevilton	Manapouri	Pilton
Missen Flat	Headington Hill	Upper Pilton
Clifton	Spring Creek	Spring Creek

Headington Hill is a rural locality in the Toowoomba Region, Queensland, Australia. In the 2021 census, Headington Hill had a population of 87 people.

== Geography ==
The Gatton–Clifton Road runs through from north to south-west.

== History ==
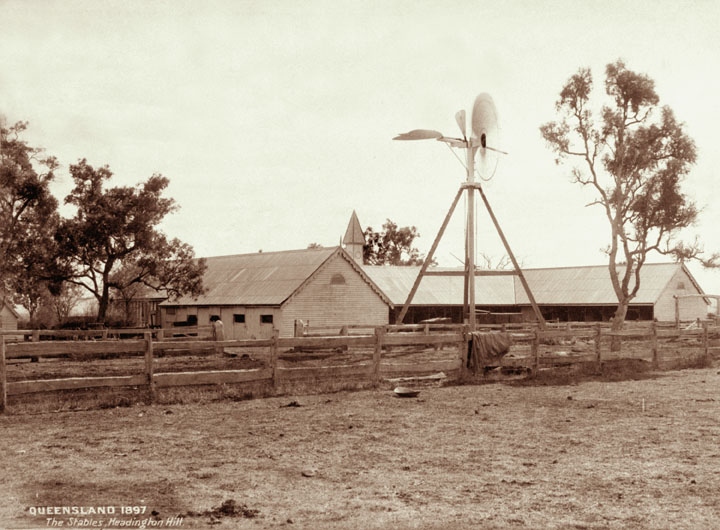
The Stables and windmill at Headington Hill, 1897

The locality was probably named after a large freehold estate called Headington Hill established by George Henry Davenport (1831–1881). The original Headington Hill is to the north-east of Oxford, England. Davenport's father, George Francis Davenport, would have known it well, as he was the brother of John Marriott Davenport, who lived in Davenport House at the summit of Headington Hill above Oxford.

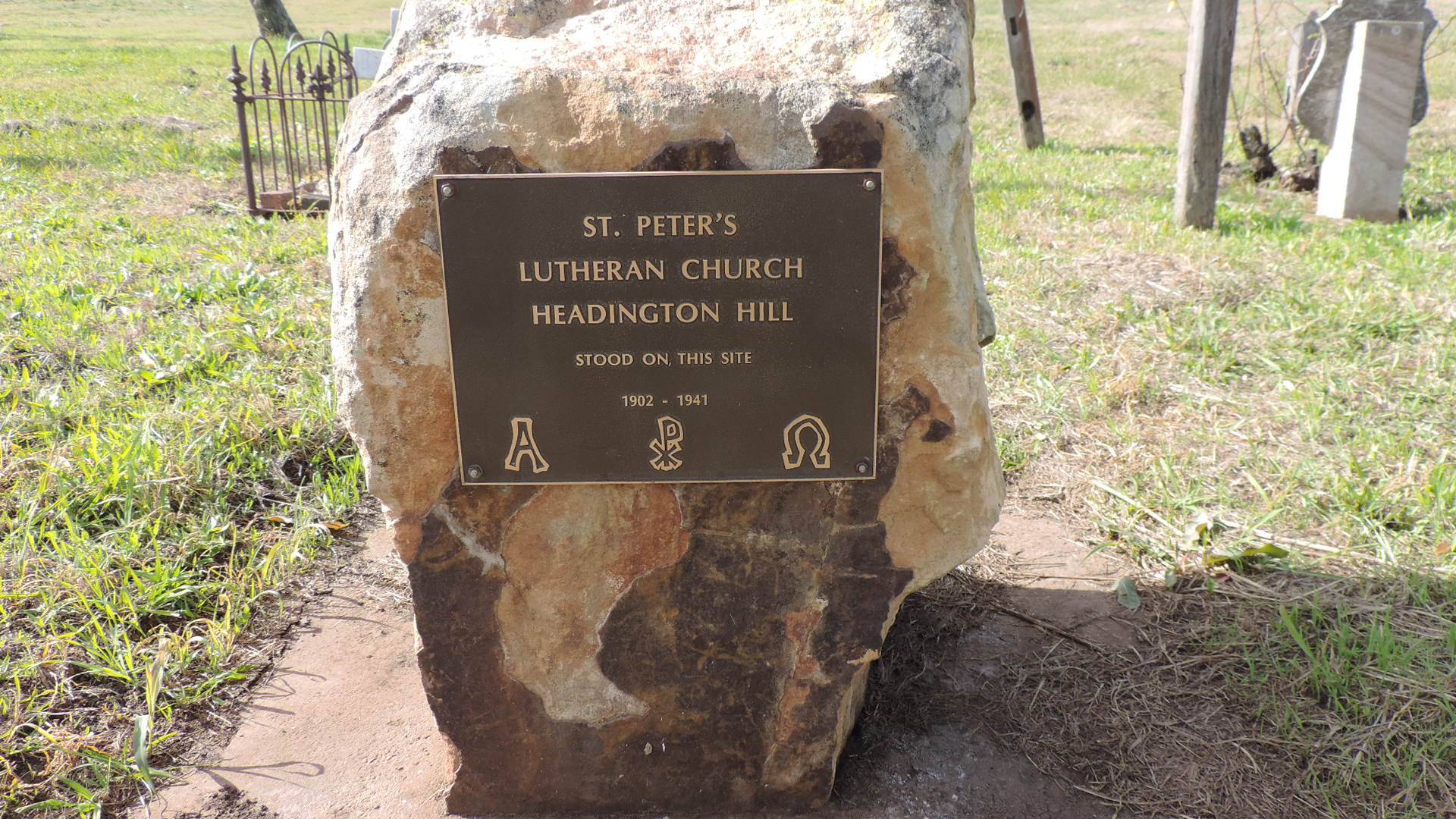
Former site of St Peter's Evangelical Lutheran Church and cemetery, 2015

St Peter's Lutheran Church opened on Sunday 25 May 1902 on land donated by Johann Gottfried Paech. The timber church had a porch and a domed ceiling and was 35 by 20 feet (10.7 m × 6.1 m) and 12 feet (3.7 m) high. It was built by contractor Alfred Morton of Clifton. It was on Carey's Road (27.89334°S 151.99845°E). It closed in 1941. It was dismantled and its materials were used in the construction of Holy Trinity Lutheran Church in Nobby. A small churchyard cemetery remains on the site.

Headington Hill Provisional School opened on 11 May 1903. On 1 January 1909, it became Headington Hill State School. In 1910 it was renamed Nevilton State School. It closed in 1921. Nevilton State School reopened circa 1936, but evident closed again, as it reopened in 1946 after a closure of a "number of years". It closed permanently in 1958. It was within the present-day boundaries of Nevilton.

McGovern's Hill State School opened on 11 July 1912 but was renamed Headington Hill State School later that year. It closed in 1967. The school was located on the south-east corner of Gatton Clifton Road and McGovern Road (27.90533°S 152.00231°E).

== Demographics ==
In the 2016 census, Headington Hill had a population of 58 people.

In the 2021 census, Headington Hill had a population of 87 people.

== Education ==
There are no schools in Headington Hill. The nearest government schools are Pilton State School in neighbouring Pilton to the north-east and Clifton State School in neighbouring Clifton to the south-west. The nearest government secondary school is Clifton State High School, also in Clifton. There is also a Catholic primary school in Clifton.
