= Elphinstone, Queensland (Toowoomba Region) =

Elphinstone
- Suburb
- Interactive map of Elphinstone
- Coordinates: 27.9819°S 151.9011°E
- Country: Australia
- State: Queensland
- LGA: Toowoomba Region
- Location: 5.3 km (3.3 mi) S of Clifton; 51.5 km (32.0 mi) S of Toowoomba CBD; 165 km (103 mi) SW of Brisbane

Government
  - State electorate: Condamine
  - Federal division: Maranoa

Area
  - Total: 26.3 km^{2} (10.2 sq mi)

Population
  - Total: 60 (2021 census)
  - Density: 2.28/km^{2} (5.9/sq mi)
- Time zone: UTC+10:00 (AEST)
- Postcode: 4361
Suburbs around Elphinstone
Clifton	Clifton	Spring Creek
Sandy Camp	Elphinstone	Allora
Talgai	Talgai	Allora

Elphinstone is a rural locality in the Toowoomba Region, Queensland, Australia. In the 2021 census, Elphinstone had a population of 60 people.

== History ==
The locality's name was originally a railway station name, called after pioneer Darling Downs pastoralist Ernest George Beck Elphinstone Dalrymple related to Patrick Leslie of Canning Downs and Goomburra.

Elphinstone Provisional School opened on 28 May 1888. On 1 January 1909, it became Elphinstone State School. It closed temporarily in 1922, but soon re-opened. It closed permanently in 1963. It was at 519 Dungannon Road (27.97308°S 151.87121°E).

== Demographics ==
In the 2016 census, Elphinstone had a population of 64 people.

In the 2021 census, Elphinstone had a population of 60 people.

== Education ==
There are no schools in Elphinstone. The nearest government primary and secondary schools are Clifton State School and Clifton State High School respectively, both in neighbouring Clifton to the north.
