= Darling Downs Zoo =

- Interactive map of Darling Downs Zoo
- 27.892277°S 152.020035°E
- Date opened: 11 June 2005
- Location: Pilton, Queensland, Australia
- Land area: 50 acres (20 ha)
- No. of animals: 500 (approx.)
- No. of species: 110+
- Memberships: Zoo and Aquarium Association
- Website: www.darlingdownszoo.com.au

Darling Downs Zoo is a zoo situated in Pilton, Queensland, Australia. The zoo is divided into four separate geographical areas featuring animals mostly from Africa, South America, South-East Asia and Australia.

== History ==
The zoo was closed from 27 March to 9 June 2020 due to government restrictions during the COVID-19 pandemic in Australia. As the zoo had large carnivores it had problems feeding them. It relied on bank loans and generous people to cover costs, and also set up a crowdfunding page to raise money. The zoo has since re-opened to the public.

On 6 July 2025, a woman was severely injured in the arm after being attacked by a lion at the zoo.

== Species ==
Species at the zoo from different regions (continent alphabetical below) include:

Africa

- Addax
- African lion (including Timbavati white lion)
- Aldabra giant tortoise
- Black-and-white ruffed lemur
- Cape porcupine
- Caracal
- Cheetah
- Dromedary camel
- Dumeril's boa
- Giraffe
- Grant's zebra
- Grey parrot
- Hamadryas baboon
- Meerkat
- Ostrich
- Pygmy hippopotamus
- Radiated tortoise
- Ring-tailed lemur
- Serval
- Spotted hyena

Americas

- American alligator
- Blue-and-yellow macaw
- Boa constrictor
- Brown-nosed coati
- Bolivian squirrel monkey
- Brazilian agouti
- Capybara
- Common marmoset
- Cotton-top tamarin
- Emperor tamarin
- Golden lion tamarin
- Green anaconda
- Guanaco
- Llama
- Maned wolf
- Pygmy marmoset
- Red-and-green macaw
- Red-handed tamarin
- Rhinoceros iguana
- Scarlet macaw
- Tufted capuchin
- Turquoise-fronted parrot
- Yellow anaconda
- Yellow-crowned amazon
- Coati

Asia

- Alexandrine parakeet
- Blackbuck
- Burmese python
- Golden pheasant
- Indian star tortoise
- Javan binturong
- Komodo dragon
- Mandarin duck
- Nicobar pigeon
- Pied stilt
- Red-whiskered bulbul
- Siamang
- Sri Lankan leopard
- Sumatran tiger

Australasia

- Australian barn owl
- Australian brush-turkey
- Australian bustard
- Australian grass owl
- Australian king parrot
- Australian pelican
- Banded lapwing
- Bare-nosed wombat
- Black-necked stork
- Black swan
- Budgerigar
- Bush stone-curlew
- Cape Barren goose
- Central bearded dragon
- Centralian blue-tongued lizard
- Chestnut rail
- Cockatiel
- Common ringtail possum
- Diamond dove
- Dingo
- Eastern bearded dragon
- Eastern blue-tongued lizard
- Eclectus parrot
- Emu
- Freshwater crocodile
- Galah
- Gang-gang cockatoo
- Koala
- Laughing kookaburra
- Little penguin
- Major Mitchell's cockatoo
- Malleefowl
- Nankeen kestrel
- Nankeen night heron
- Noisy pitta
- Perentie
- Quokka
- Red kangaroo
- Red-legged pademelon
- Red-tailed black cockatoo
- Red-winged parrot
- Regent bowerbird
- Rose-crowned fruit dove
- Royal spoonbill
- Rufous bettong
- Saltwater crocodile
- Satin bowerbird
- Shingleback lizard
- Sulphur-crested cockatoo
- Tawny frogmouth
- Whiptail wallaby
- White-breasted ground dove
- Yellow-tailed black cockatoo

Eurasia

- Red deer

== Photos ==
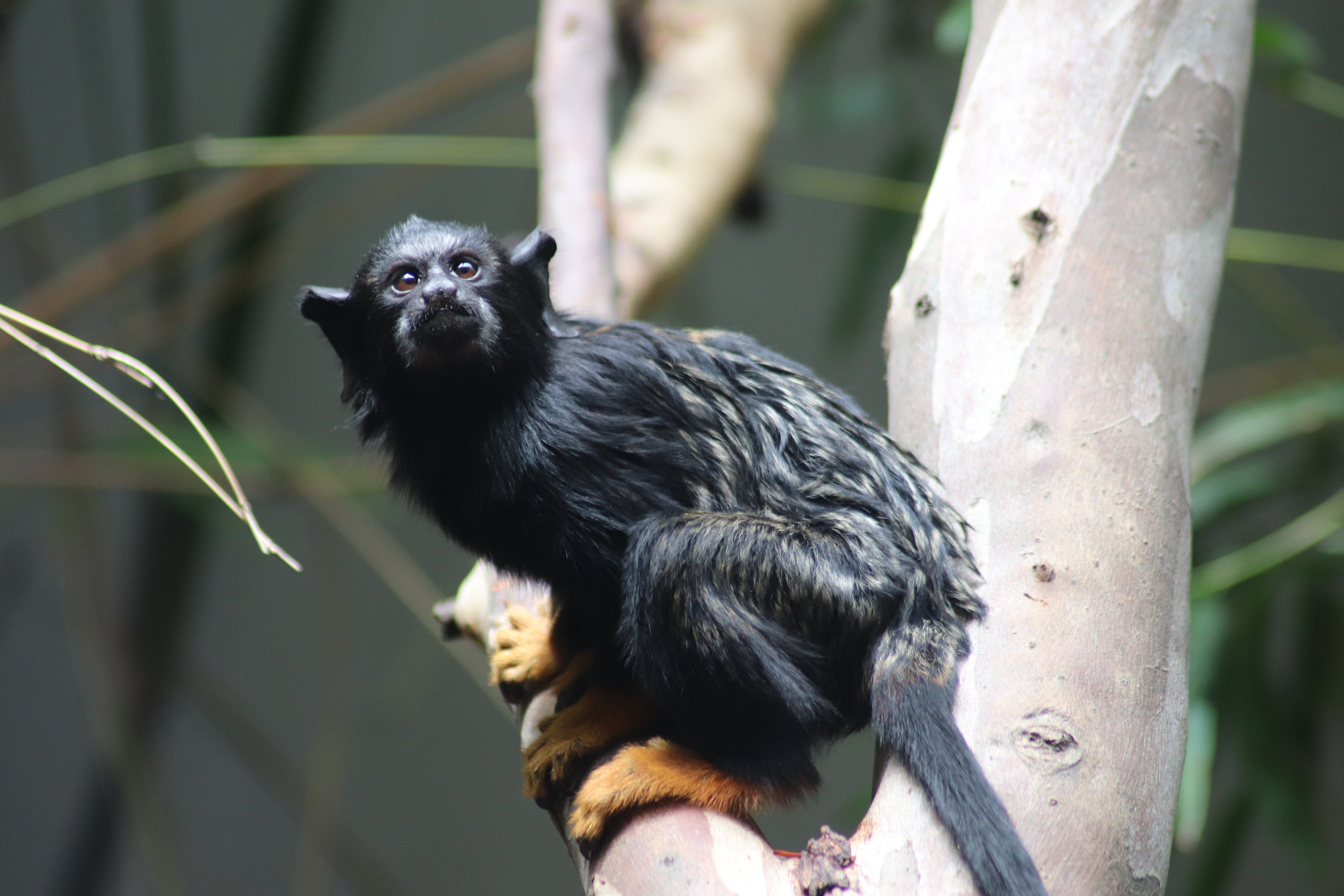
Red-handed tamarin at the zoo

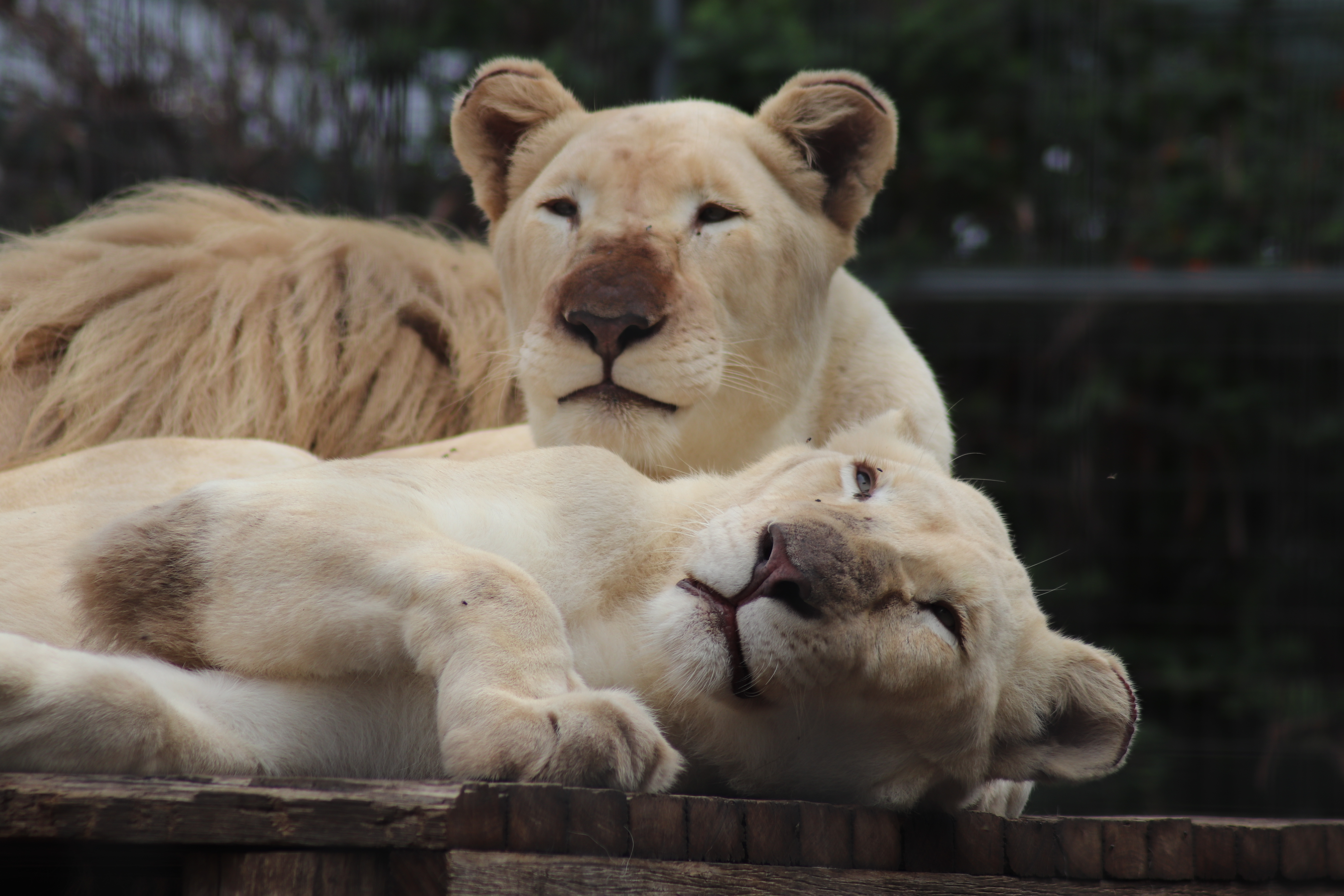
White-coated African lions at the zoo

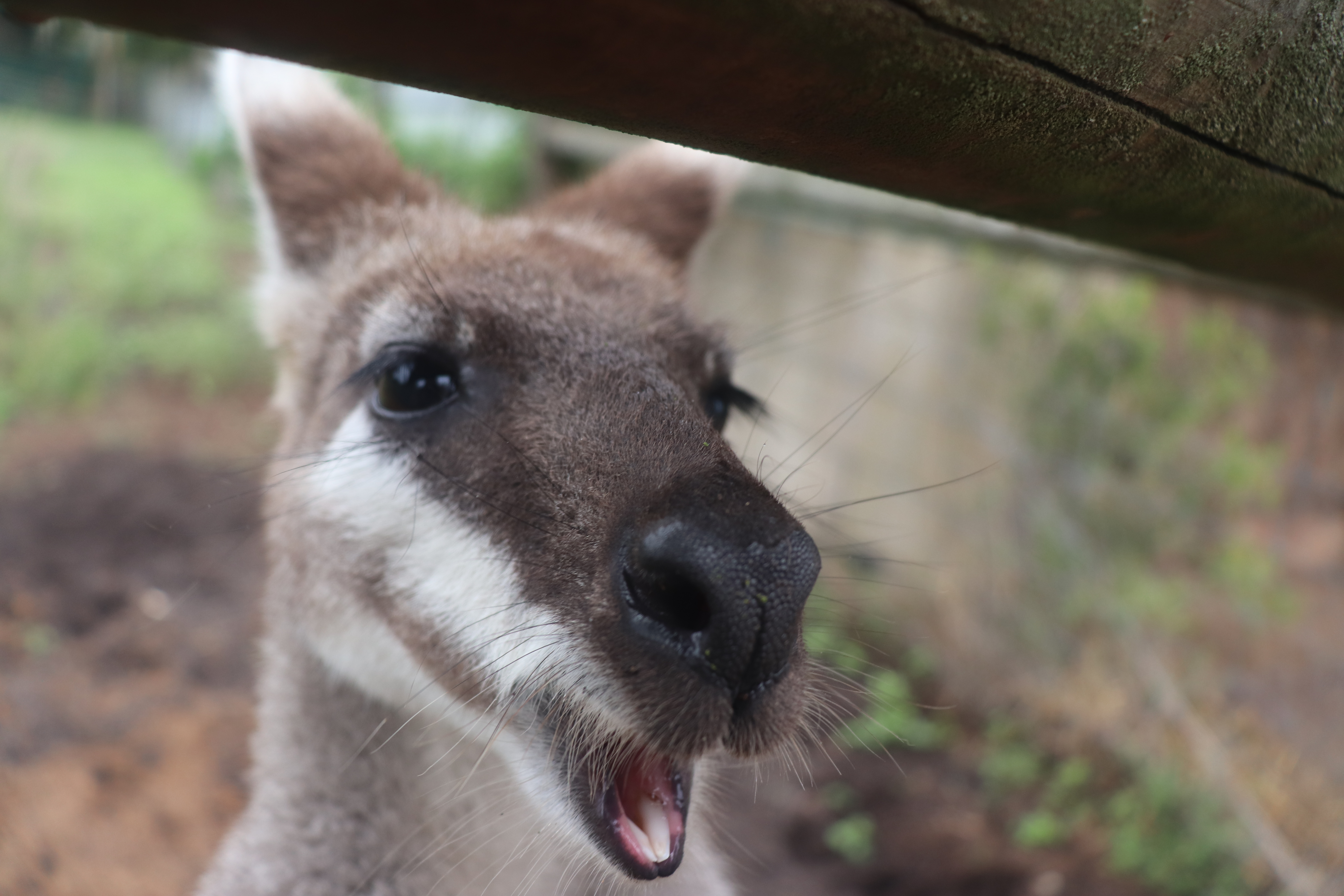
Whiptail wallaby at the zoo

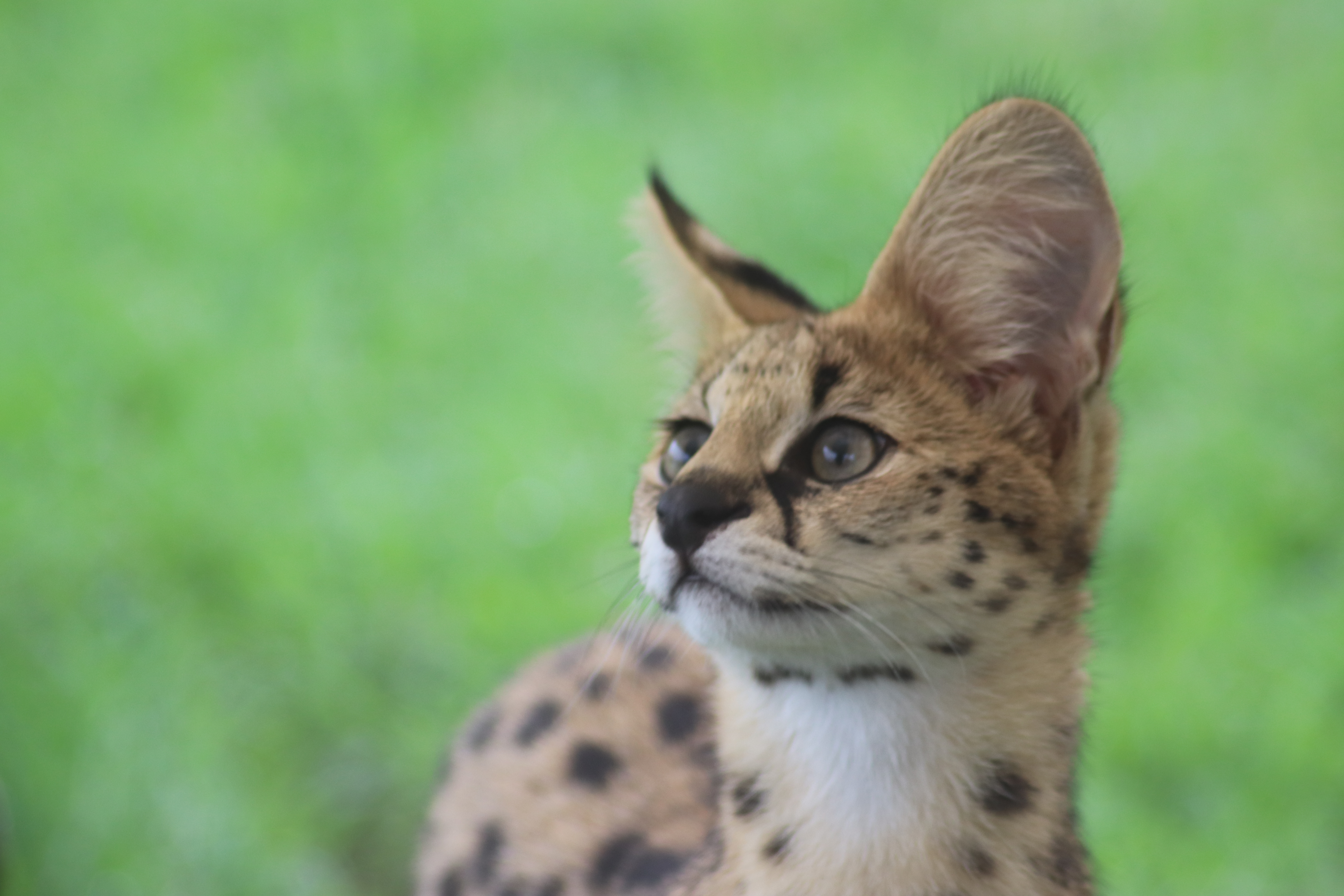
Serval at the zoo
