= Gatton–Clifton Road =

Road route in Queensland, Australia

Gatton–Clifton Road Queensland

General information
- Type: Rural road
- Length: 63.1 km (39 mi)
- Route number(s): State Route 80 (Lower Tenthill–Clifton)

Major junctions
- North-east end: Gatton–Helidon Road (State Route 80), Lower Tenthill
- Mount Sylvia Road; Greenmount–Hirstvale Road; (A3) New England Highway
- South-west end: Felton–Clifton Road, Clifton

Location(s)
- Major settlements: Ma Ma Creek, West Haldon, Pilton

Gatton–Clifton Road is a continuous 63.1 kilometres (39.2 mi) road route in the Lockyer Valley and Toowoomba regions of Queensland, Australia. Most of the road is signed as State Route 80. Gatton–Clifton Road (number 313) is a state-controlled road, part regional and part district. The district part is rated as a local road of regional significance (LRRS).

== Route Description ==
The Gatton–Clifton Road commences at an intersection with Gatton–Helidon Road (State Route 80) in Lower Tenthill, just west of Gatton. The road runs south-west, following Ma Ma Creek (the watercourse) through Winwill to the locality of Ma Ma Creek. It passes the exit to Mount Sylvia Road as it leaves Winwill. Land use along this section of the road is irrigated crops. From here it runs through Mount Whitestone and reaches the foothills of the Great Dividing Range.

The road follows a winding, scenic route as it climbs the range, passing through native forest. It runs through the localities of Fordsdale, West Haldon and Hirstglen before reaching the top of the range in Pilton. In Hirstglen it passes the exit to Greenmount–Hirstvale Road. From the top of the range it enters open farming country, passing through Headington Hill and reaching the New England Highway. There State Route 80 ends, and Gatton–Clifton Road turns south on the highway. After 1.2 kilometres (0.75 mi) it exits to the west with no route number. It enters Clifton as East Street, and crosses the railway line before reaching an intersection with King Street. The road ends here, with Felton–Clifton Road running north as King Street.

In Fordsdale the road crosses Heifer Creek, where there is a popular camping area. From there it follows the creek to Hirstglen, which is why it is unofficially known as Heifer Creek Road.

== Road condition ==
Gatton–Clifton Road is fully sealed. It has about 5.6 kilometres (3.5 miles) with an incline greater than 5%, about 3.2 kilometres (2.0 miles) greater than 10%, and about 1.3 kilometres (0.81 miles)greater than 15%. The height above sea level at the top of the range is 580 metres (1,900 ft).

== Intersecting state-controlled roads ==
This road intersects with the following state-controlled roads:

- Gatton–Helidon Road
- Mount Sylvia Road
- Greenmount–Hirstvale Road
- Felton–Clifton Road

=== Gatton–Helidon Road ===
Gatton–Helidon Road
- Location: Gatton to Helidon
- Length: 17.5 km (10.9 mi)
- Route number: 80

Gatton–Helidon Road is a state-controlled road (number 314), part regional and part district. The district part is rated as a local road of regional significance (LRRS). Part of it is part of State Route 80, and all of it is part of the Warrego Way. It is part of the former route of the Warrego Highway through Gatton.

A project to widen multiple high-speed sections of Gatton–Helidon Road, at a cost of $4.6 million, was expected to be completed in June 2022.

==== State Route 80 ====
State Route 80 starts at an intersection with the Warrego Highway in the north-eastern corner of Gatton. It follows the former route of the highway through Gatton, which becomes Gatton-Helidon Road. It turns south-west onto Gatton–Clifton Road and follows it to the New England Highway at Clifton.

==== Warrego Way ====
Warrego Way is a State Strategic Touring Route from Brisbane to Birdsville. It follows the Warrego Highway, with some diversions, from Brisbane to Charleville. It leaves the highway in the north-eastern corner of Gatton and follows the former route of the highway. This becomes Gatton–Helidon Road, which it follows to Helidon where it rejoins the highway.

=== Mount Sylvia Road ===
Mount Sylvia Road
- Location: Gatton–Clifton Road, Winwill to East Haldon Road, Junction View
- Length: 23.6 km (14.7 mi)

Mount Sylvia Road is a state-controlled district road (number 3131) rated as a local road of regional significance (LRRS). It runs from Gatton–Clifton Road in Winwill to East Haldon Road in Junction View, a distance of 23.6 kilometres (14.7 mi). The road has no major intersections.

=== Greenmount–Hirstvale Road ===
Greenmount–Hirstvale Road
- Location: New England Highway, East Greenmount to Gatton–Clifton Road, Hirstglen
- Length: 12.3 km (7.6 mi)

Greenmount–Hirstvale Road is a state-controlled road (number 3102) rated as a local road of regional significance (LRRS). It runs from the New England Highway in East Greenmount to Gatton–Clifton Road in Hirstglen, a distance of 12.3 kilometres (7.6 mi). This road has no major intersections.

=== Felton–Clifton Road ===
Felton–Clifton Road
- Location: Toowoomba–Karara Road, Felton to Gatton–Clifton Road, Clifton
- Length: 24.5 km (15.2 mi)

Felton–Clifton Road is a state-controlled district road (number 330) rated as a local road of regional significance (LRRS). It runs from Toowoomba–Karara Road in Felton to Gatton–Clifton Road in Clifton, a distance of 24.5 kilometres (15.2 mi). This road intersects with Clifton–Leyburn Road in Clifton and Nobby Connection Road.

== History ==
Gatton was gazetted as a settlement in 1855, and the railway arrived in 1866. With the arrival of the railway the town expanded quickly as a commercial centre for the surrounding district. The Tenthill pastoral run was established in 1845, and settlement in the rich Ma Ma Creek valley occurred as land became available. Road construction occurred as settlement expanded towards the foot of the range.

The Clifton pastoral run was established about 1844, and the Pilton run, originally part of Clifton, was separately established in the 1840s. Headington Hill was a large freehold estate established in the 1840s. The first road was cut to service these properties. In 1877, 6,000 acres (2,400 ha) were resumed from the Clifton pastoral run and offered for selection on 17 April 1877. Subsequent development of small farms to the north of Clifton led to road improvements.

The mountain section, including a 31.7 metres (104 ft) deep cutting, was built in 1940. Many factors had led to its construction; among them was reduced travel time between Gatton and Clifton, and a less steep ascent / descent than on the Toowoomba range crossing.

== Major intersections ==
All distances are from Google Maps.

LGA	Location	km	mi	Destinations	Notes
Lockyer Valley	Lower Tenthill	0	0.0	Gatton–Helidon Road (State Route 80) – east – Gatton (no shield) Gatton–Helidon Road – west – Grantham, Helidon	Northern end of Gatton–Clifton Road. Road runs south–west as State Route 80.
Lockyer Valley	Winwill / Ma Ma Creek midpoint	6.0	3.7	Mount Sylvia Road – south–east – Mount Sylvia	
Toowoomba	Hirstglen	41.0	25.5	Greenmount–Hirstvale Road – west – Greenmount	
Toowoomba	Missen Flat / Headington Hill / Clifton tripoint	53.8	33.4	New England Highway – north – East Greenmount – south – Allora	End of State Route 80. Road turns south on New England Highway.
Toowoomba	Headington Hill / Spring Creek / Clifton tripoint	55.0	34.2	New England Highway – south – Allora	Road turns west to Clifton.
Toowoomba	Clifton	63.1	39.2	Felton–Clifton Road – north – Felton	Southern end of Gatton–Clifton Road
1.000 mi = 1.609 km; 1.000 km = 0.621 mi: Concurrency terminus

== See also ==
- List of road routes in Queensland
- List of numbered roads in Queensland
