= Pilton, Queensland =

Pilton
- Town
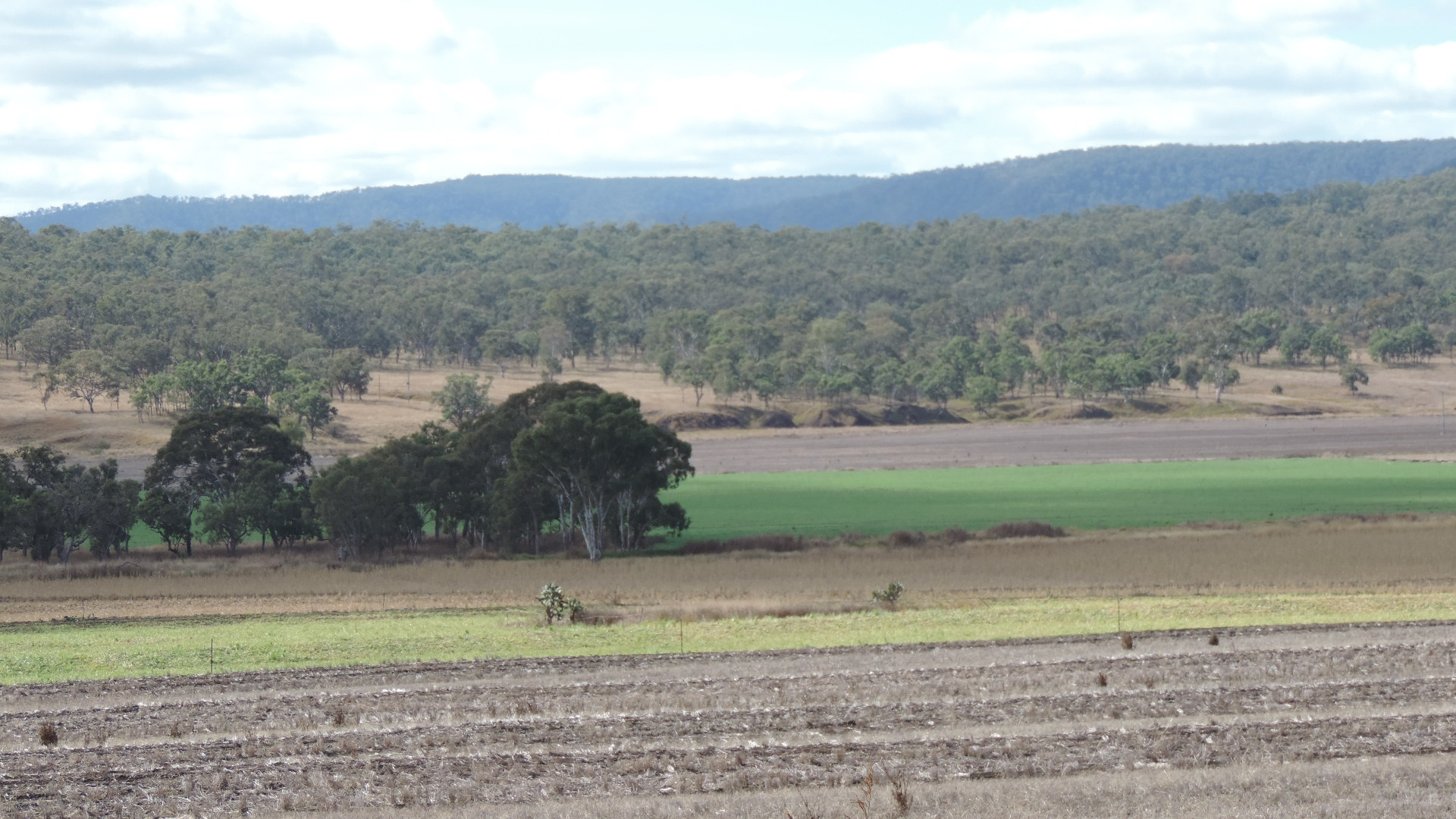
- Looking north-east from Pilton State School across farmland, Pilton, 2015.jpg

- Interactive map of Pilton
- Coordinates: 27.8683°S 152.0475°E
- Country: Australia
- State: Queensland
- LGA: Toowoomba Region
- Location: 18.4 km (11.4 mi) ENE of Clifton; 22.3 km (13.9 mi) NE of Allora; 46.6 km (29.0 mi) S of Toowoomba CBD; 142 km (88 mi) WSW of Brisbane

Government
  - State electorate: Condamine
  - Federal division: Maranoa

Area
  - Total: 41.9 km^{2} (16.2 sq mi)

Population
  - Total: 71 (2021 census)
  - Density: 1.695/km^{2} (4.39/sq mi)
- Time zone: UTC+10:00 (AEST)
- Postcode: 4361
Localities around Pilton
Ascot	Hirstglen	Hirstglen
Manapouri	Pilton	Upper Pilton
Headington Hill	Upper Pilton	Upper Pilton

Pilton is a rural town and locality in the Toowoomba Region, Queensland, Australia. It is south of the city of Toowoomba. In the 2021 census, the locality of Pilton had a population of 71 people.

== Geography ==
The terrain in the north and south of the locality is more mountainous and is predominantly used for grazing on native vegetation. The terrain from the south-east to the north-west is within a valley through which Kings Creek flows from Upper Pilton through to Manapouri/Ascot and is ultimately a tributary of the Condamine River, part of the Murray-Darling basin. The valley is used for cropping.

The Gatton–Clifton Road (State Route 80) also passes through the locality from the south-west (Headington Hill) to the north-west (Hirstglen).

== History ==
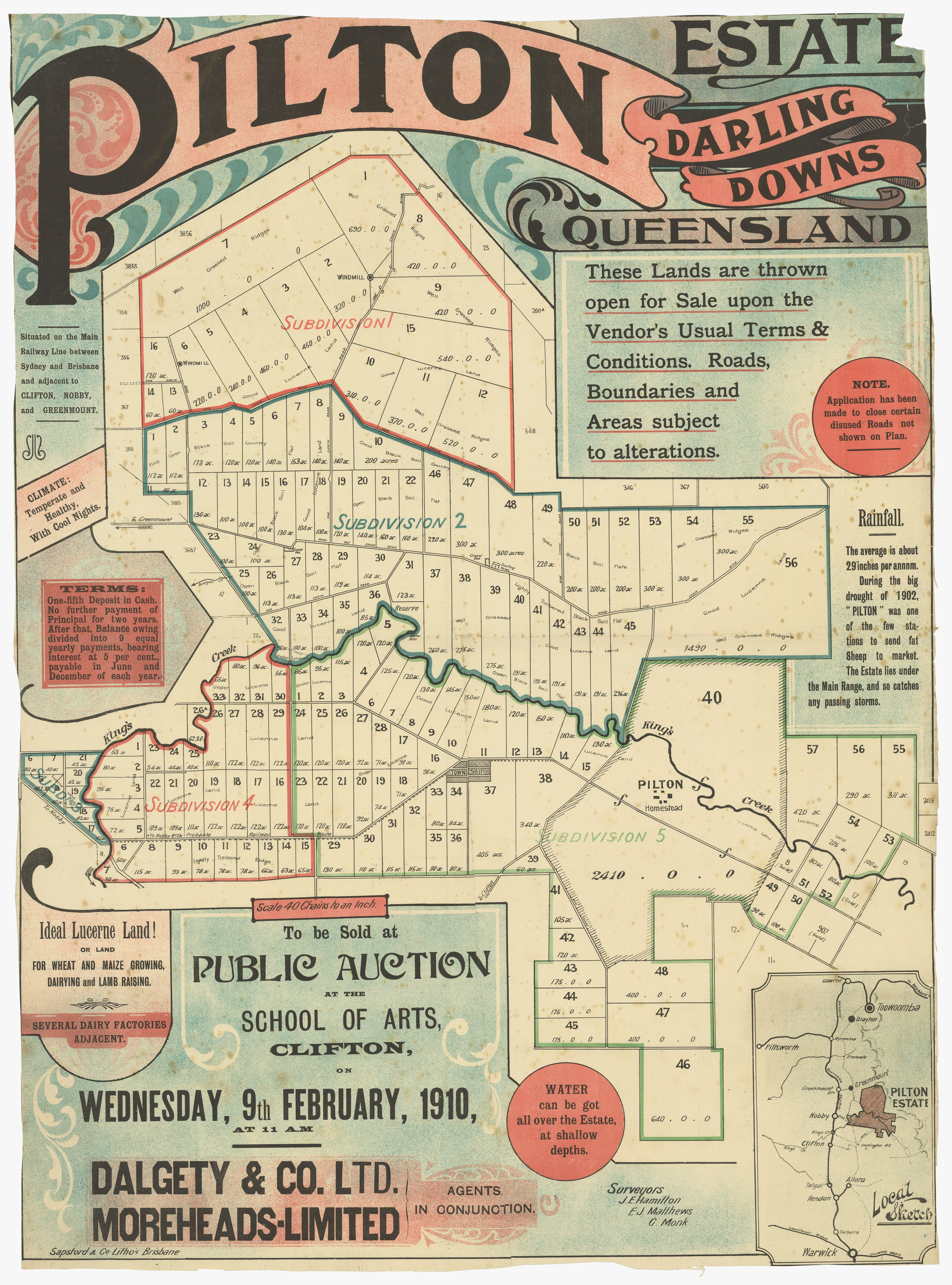
Advertising for land sales for the Pilton Estate, 1910

Pilton is named after a pastoral run which was excised from Clifton pastoral station in the 1840s. The run was leased by Philip Pinnock, John Gammie, Joseph King and Joshua J. Whitting [from 1851-9]. It might have been named after Pilton, Somerset, England, an Old English name with Pil meaning creek and ton meaning an enclosed homestead.

Pilton Post Office opened on 27 March 1878 (though a receiving office for some years) and closed in 1977.

Pilton Provisional School opened in February 1884. It closed in 1908.

Pilton State School opened on 3 November 1913.

== Demographics ==
In the 2006 census, the locality of Pilton had a population of 209 people, living in 74 inhabited dwellings. The median age of the population was 41 years, and the median weekly household income was $866.

In the 2016 census, the locality of Pilton had a population of 88 people.

In the 2021 census, the locality of Pilton had a population of 71 people.

== Education ==
Pilton State School is a government primary (Prep-6) school for boys and girls at 24 Pilton Valley Road (27.8679°S 152.0497°E). In 2017, the school had an enrolment of 29 students with 3 teachers (2 full-time equivalent) and 6 non-teaching staff (3 full-time equivalent). In 2018, the school had an enrolment of 18 students with 2 teachers and 4 non-teaching staff (2 full-time equivalent).

There is no secondary school in Pilton; the nearest government secondary school is Clifton State High School in Clifton to the south-west.

== Attractions ==
The Darling Downs Zoo is in the south-west corner of the locality.
