= New England Highway =

Highway in New South Wales and Queensland

New England Highway Queensland–New South Wales

General information
- Type: Highway
- Length: 880 km (547 mi)
- Gazetted: August 1928 (NSW, as Main Road 9)
- Route number(s): A3 (2005–present) (Yarraman–Warwick); A15 (2005/2013–present) (Warwick–Whittingham); A15 (2024–present) (Whittingham–Branxton); A43 (2014–present) (Branxton–Hexham); Concurrencies: State Route 85 (1980s–present) (Hampton–Toowoomba); A1 (2013–present) (Beresfield–Hexham)
- Former route number: State Route 61 (1990s–2005) (Yarraman–Hampton); National Route 42 (1974–2005) (Toowoomba–Warwick); National Highway 15 (1974–2005/2013) (Warwick–Beresfield); National Route 15 (1955–1974) (Warwick–Hexham); A15 (2013–2014) (Branxton–Beresfield)

Major junctions
- North end: D'Aguilar Highway; Yarraman, Queensland
- Esk–Hampton Road; Toowoomba Connection Road; Cunningham Highway; Cunningham Highway; Bruxner Highway; Gwydir Highway; Waterfall Way; Oxley Highway; Fossickers Way; Oxley Highway; Kamilaroi Highway; Golden Highway; Hunter Expressway; John Renshaw Drive
- South end: Pacific Highway; Hexham, New South Wales

Location(s)
- Major settlements: Crows Nest, Toowoomba, Warwick, Tenterfield, Glen Innes, Armidale, Tamworth, Muswellbrook, Maitland

Highway system
- Highways in Australia; National Highway • Freeways in Australia; Highways in Queensland; Highways in New South Wales

New England Highway is an 883-kilometre (549 mi) long highway in Australia running from Yarraman, north of Toowoomba, Queensland, at its northern end to Hexham at Newcastle, New South Wales, at its southern end. It is part of Australia's National Highway system, and forms part of the inland route between Brisbane and Sydney.

== State-controlled road in Queensland ==
The Queensland segment of the New England Highway is a state-controlled road, subdivided into three sections for administrative and funding purposes. One of the three sections (number 22C) is part of the National Highway, while sections 22A and 22B are strategic roads. The sections are:

- 22A – Yarraman to Toowoomba
- 22B – Toowoomba to Warwick
- 22C – Warwick to Wallangarra

State-controlled roads that intersect with the highway are listed in the main article.

== Route ==
At its northern end New England Highway connects to D'Aguilar Highway, and at its southern end it connects to Pacific Highway. It traverses the Darling Downs, New England, and Hunter Valley regions.

During the winter months, some parts of the New England Highway are subject to frost and snowfall, with the 350 km section from the Moonbi Ranges to Stanthorpe located at high altitudes.

=== Traffic volume ===
In 2013–14, the New England and Cunningham Highways combined (known as the Sydney–Brisbane inland route) had an average annual daily traffic count of just over 13,000 vehicles, which is approximately half that seen on the coastal route (i.e., the Pacific Highway and Pacific Motorway). Heavy vehicles account for approximately 13% of the traffic seen on the route.

=== Speed cameras ===
As of November 2018, fixed speed cameras were located at Ben Lomond (between Ross Road and Ben Lomond Road), Blandford (between Hayles Street and Mills Street) and Tenterfield (between Duncan Street and George Street). Average speed enforcement (point-to-point) cameras target heavy vehicles between Singleton and Muswellbrook.

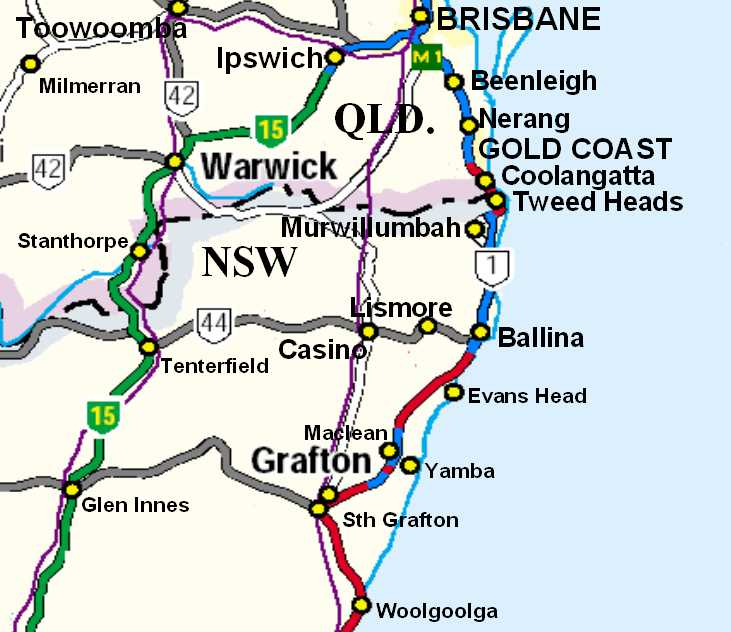
From Brisbane, National Highway 15 (green) follows the Cunningham Highway until Warwick where it then follows southwards, the New England Highway.

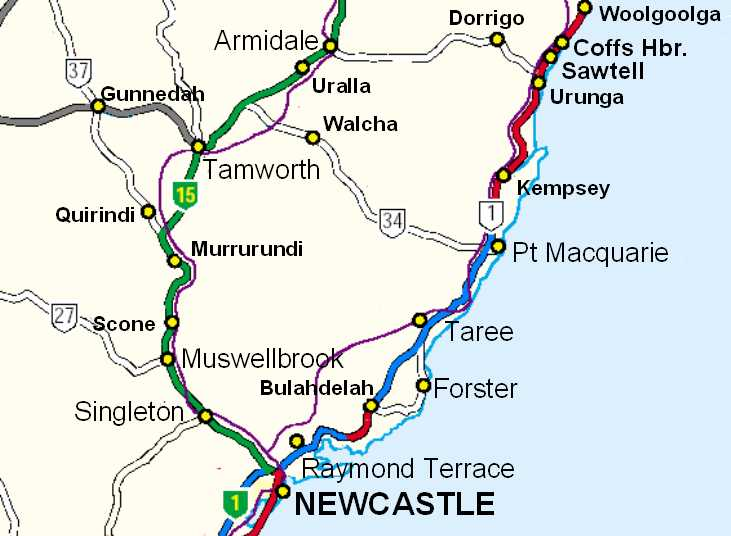
Through Armidale, Tamworth, Maitland and Hexham where it joins the Pacific Highway

== History ==
New England Highway has its origins in the track which developed north from Newcastle to reach the prime wool growing areas of the New England region which Europeans settled following expeditions by NSW Surveyor-General John Oxley in 1818 and botanist Allan Cunningham in 1827 and 1829. The rough track, navigable only by horse or bullock dray, crossed the Liverpool Range, went through Tamworth and ended at Tenterfield. The track became known as the Great Northern Road. During the 1860s, several robberies occurred along the road, with infamous bushranger Captain Thunderbolt known to be active in the area.

The passing of the Main Roads Act of 1924 through the Parliament of New South Wales provided for the declaration of Main Roads, roads partially funded by the State government through the Main Roads Board (later the Department of Main Roads, and eventually Transport for NSW). Great Northern Highway was declared (as Main Road No. 9) on 8 August 1928, replacing the Great Northern Road and running from North Sydney via Hornsby, Peat's Ferry, Gosford, Swansea, Newcastle, Maitland, Singleton, Tamworth, Armidale, Glen Innes, Tenterfield and Woodenbong to the border with Queensland; with the passing of the Main Roads (Amendment) Act of 1929 to provide for additional declarations of State Highways and Trunk Roads, this was amended to State Highway 9 on 8 April 1929.

The section of Great Northern Highway between Sydney and Hexham was subsumed into Pacific Highway on 26 May 1931; the southern end of Great Northern Highway was truncated at the intersection with Pacific Highway at Hexham as a result. The remaining portion from Hexham to Brisbane was later renamed New England Highway, through Queensland on 14 February 1933, and a month later through New South Wales on 14 March 1933. In 1936 the road was described by contemporary observers as being in good condition, with spectacular scenery and excellent accommodation en route.

The Department of Main Roads, which had succeeded the New South Wales MRB in 1932, declared Main Road 374 on 16 March 1938, from the intersection with Tenterfield-Yetman Road (later Bruxner Highway) just north of Tenterfield to the state border with Queensland at Wallangarra; this was replaced with the declaration of State Highway 24 along the same route on 11 January 1950.

New England Highway was re-routed through Warwick along the route that was then known in Queensland as the Lockyer-Darling Downs Highway on 11 August 1954, with the new alignment of State Highway 9 subsuming State Highway 24 in New South Wales. Against the wishes of the Beaudesert Shire Council and the Woodenbong Chamber of Commerce, the former alignment of New England Highway through Beaudesert was renamed Mount Lindesay Highway, and the New South Wales section was re-declared as State Highway 24 (this was eventually revoked on 23 December 1981 and re-declared as Main Road 622).

In the 1970s, the Queensland Main Roads Department rerouted the designation of New England Highway north of Warwick to follow the former Lockyer-Darling Downs Highway (National Route 17) so that it terminated in Toowoomba. The section of the highway between Brisbane and Warwick was renamed as part of Cunningham Highway, which until that time had extended only westward from Warwick to Goondiwindi.

The passing of the Roads Act of 1993 through the Parliament of New South Wales updated road classifications and the way they could be declared within New South Wales. Under this act, New England Highway today retains its declaration as Highway 9, from Hexham to the state border with Queensland.

New England Highway was signed National Route 15 from Warwick to Hexham in 1955. The Whitlam Government introduced the federal National Roads Act 1974, where roads declared as a National Highway were still the responsibility of the states for road construction and maintenance, but were fully compensated by the Federal government for money spent on approved projects. As an important interstate link between the capitals of Queensland and New South Wales, New England Highway was declared a National Highway in 1974 and was consequently re-signed as National Highway 15. National Route 42 was extended north along New England Highway from Warwick to Toowoomba; State Route 85 was allocated sometime during the 1980s between Toowoomba and Hampton, and State Route 61 allocated sometime during the 1990s between Hampton and its northern terminus at Yarraman. National Highway 15 was later truncated at its southern end from Hexham to Beresfield in 1988, as the Mandalong-Freemans Waterhole stage of Sydney-Newcastle Freeway opened and National Highway 1 was rerouted via existing arterial routes to Beresfield, then along New England Highway to Hexham, before resuming its original route north along Pacific Highway.

With Queensland's conversion to the newer alphanumeric system in 2005, National Route 42 and State Route 61 were removed and replaced by route A3 between Yarraman and Warwick, now running concurrent with State Route 85 between Hampton and Toowoomba, and National Highway 15 was updated to route A15 between Warwick and the state border with New South Wales. New South Wales' conversion to the newer alphanumeric system occurred later in 2013, with National Highway 15 also updated to route A15 from the state border with Queensland to Hexham. With Hunter Expressway opening a year later in 2014, route A15 was modified to route M15 and rerouted along it east of Branxton, and route A43 was extended westwards from Hexham along New England Highway to replace it, retaining a concurrency with route A1 between Beresfield and Hexham.

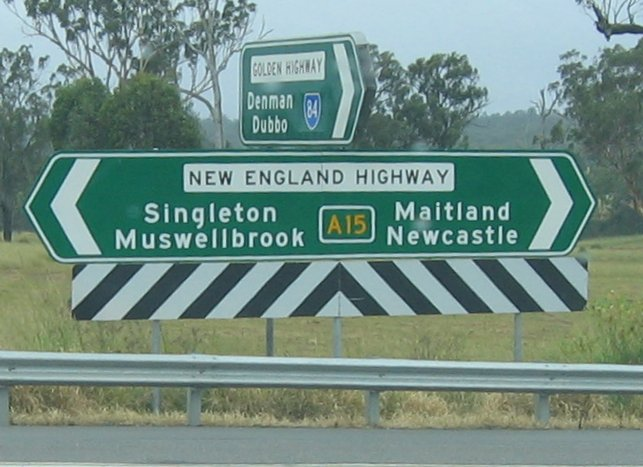
Intersection of New England Highway and Golden Highway between Branxton and Singleton

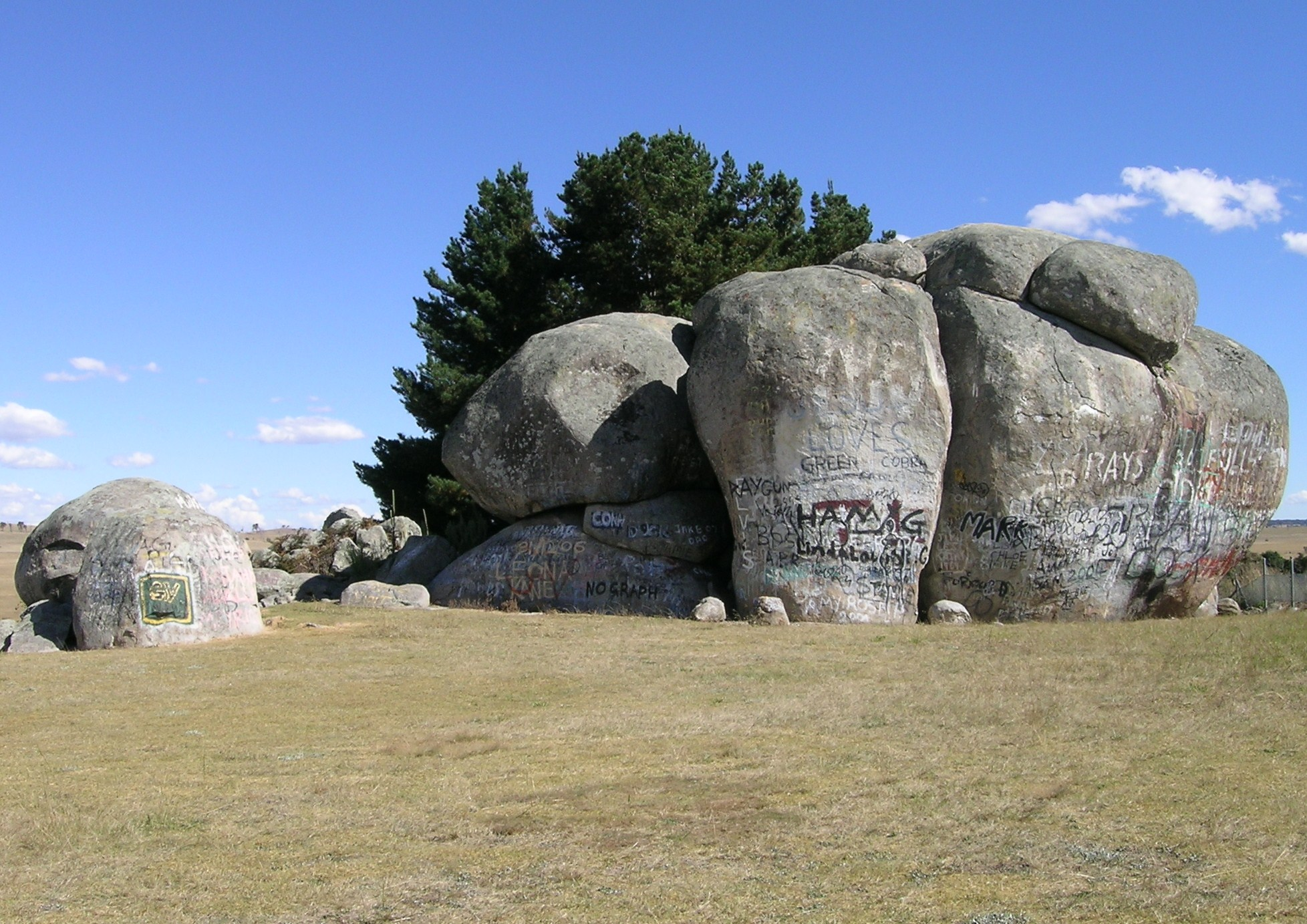
Thunderbolts Rocks, New England Highway (south of Uralla), where Thunderbolt conducted some of his robberies.

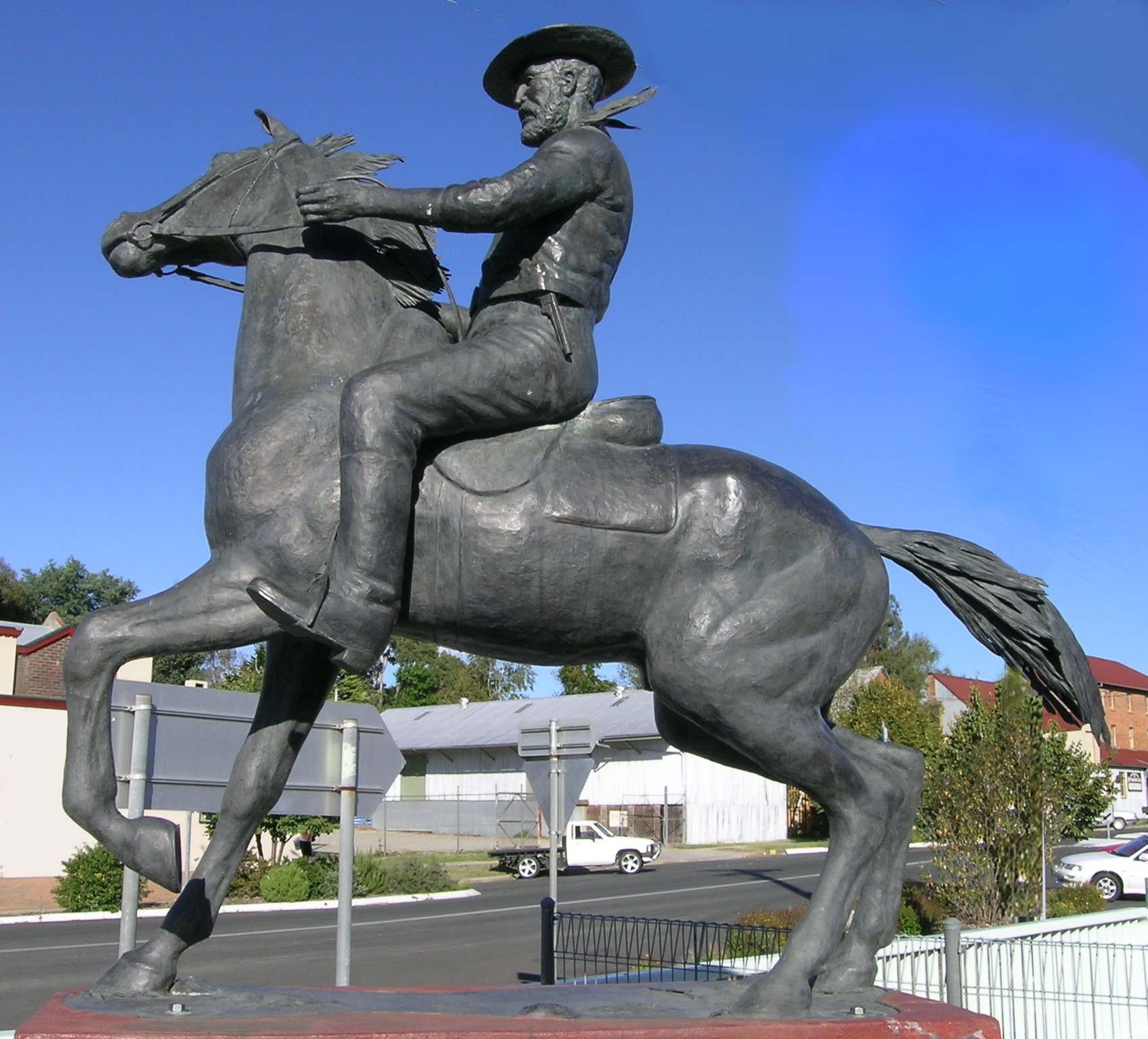
Statue of Captain Thunderbolt at the intersection of New England Highway and Thunderbolts Way, Uralla, NSW

== Highway improvements ==
As of July 2021, completed, current or proposed improvements on the New England Highway include:

- Belford to the Golden Highway. Construction contract for this $97 million project awarded June 2021.
- Bolivia Hill
- Bridge barrier improvements to four bridges between Ravensworth and Liddell. Work commenced July 2021.
- Fitzgerald Bridge, Aberdeen replaced in 2014
- Maitland roundabout improvements. $4.9 million project nearing completion.
- Muswellbrook bypass. Community feedback on the preferred option is to be sought in 2021.
- New England Highway draft corridor strategy
- New England Highway and Wyndella Road intersection, Lochinvar
- Safety improvements Whittingham. Work commenced April 2021.
- Safety upgrade Willow Tree To Uralla. Work commenced at Kootingal January 2021.
- Scone bypass. See below.
- Singleton rail underpass. See below.
- Singleton bypass. In April 2021 community feedback was incorporated into this $700 million project.
- Tenterfield heavy vehicle bypass

=== Scone bypass ===
The Scone Bypass was opened in March 2020. In addition to bypassing the town centre, it also replaces the last railway level crossing on the New England Highway.

=== Singleton rail underpass ===
The New England Highway upgrade and rail bridge replacement at Singleton (known as Gowrie Gates) was opened in July 2019. This upgrade is not part of the proposed Singleton bypass.

== Roads of Strategic Importance upgrades ==
The Roads of Strategic Importance initiative, last updated in March 2022, includes the following projects for the New England Highway in Queensland.

=== Road upgrades ===
A project to upgrade the New England Highway at Cabarlah, at an estimated cost of $5 million, was in planning at March 2022.

=== Emu Swamp Dam supporting infrastructure ===
A project to develop supporting road infrastructure for the Emu Swamp Dam, adjacent to the New England Highway at Stanthorpe, at a cost of $6.3 million is planned to be completed by mid-2023.

== Other upgrades in Queensland ==
=== Intersection upgrade ===
A project to upgrade the intersection with the Cunningham Highway east of Warwick, at a cost of $25 million, was due for completion in August 2022.

=== Improvement planning ===
Two projects to develop business cases for improvements to the highway south of Toowoomba, at a cost of $650,000, were to be completed by March 2022.

=== Safety improvements ===
A project to improve safety between Stanthorpe and Ballandean, at a cost of $19.4 million, was ongoing in July 2022.

=== Turning lanes at Cabarlah ===
A project to construct turning lanes at Cabarlah, at a cost of $600,000, was in the planning stage in July 2022.

=== Upgrade planning Warwick to Stanthorpe ===
A project to plan for upgrades between Warwick and Stanthorpe, at a cost of $450,000, was completed in October 2021.

=== Pavement widening near Cooyar ===
A project to deliver widened pavement near Cooyar, at a cost of $24.576 million, was to finish by July 2022.

== Former route allocations ==
New England Highway has had many former route allocations including former National Route 15. Where and when the former route numbers were implemented are stated below:

Section	Formerly	Presently
Yarraman – Hampton	State Route 61 1990s–2005	A3 2005–present
Hampton – Toowoomba	State Route 85 1980s–present A3 2005–present	
Toowoomba – Warwick	National Route 42 1974–2005	A3 2005–present
Warwick – Queensland/ New South Wales border	National Route 15 1955–1974 National Highway 15 1974–2005	A15 2005–present
Queensland/New South Wales border – Whittingham	National Route 15 1955–1974 National Highway 15 1974–2013	A15 2013–present
Whittingham – Branxton	National Route 15 1955–1974 National Highway 15 1974–2013 A15 2013–2024	M15 2024–present
Branxton – Beresfield	National Route 15 1955–1974 National Highway 15 1974–2013 A15 2013–2014	A43 2014–present
Beresfield – Hexham	National Route 15 1955–1974 National Highway 15 1974–1988 National Highway 1 1988–2013	A1 2013–present A43 2014–present

== Major junctions ==
State	LGA	Location	km	mi	Destinations	Notes
Queensland	Toowoomba	Yarraman	0	0.0	D'Aguilar Highway (A3 north, A17 southeast) – Rockhampton, Nanango, Caboolture, Ipswich	Northern terminus of highway at T intersection, route A3 continues north along D'Aguilar Highway
Queensland	Toowoomba	Wutul	33	21	Oakey–Cooyar Road (State Route 68) – Oakey	T intersection
Queensland	Crows Nest Creek		74	46	Bridge over the river (no known name)	
Queensland	Toowoomba	Hampton	86	53	Esk–Hampton Road (State Route 85 east) – Esk	Four-way intersection; northern concurrency terminus with State Route 85
Queensland	Toowoomba	Harlaxton	113	70	Griffiths Street – Cranley, to Warrego Highway (A2) – Dalby, Gatton, Ipswich	T intersection
Queensland	Toowoomba	Toowoomba	118	73	Toowoomba Connection Road (A21 east) – Gatton, Ipswich	Four-way intersection; eastern concurrency terminus with route A21
Queensland	Toowoomba	Toowoomba	119	74	Toowoomba Connection Road (A21, State Route 85 west) – Dalby, Goondiwindi	Four-way intersection; western concurrency terminus with route A21 and State Route 85
Queensland	Toowoomba	Cambooya	133	83	Drayton Connection Road – Drayton, Toowoomba	Y intersection
Queensland	Toowoomba	Cambooya	137	85	Cambooya Connection Road (State Route 48) – Karara	T intersection
Queensland	Toowoomba	Clifton	162	101	Gatton–Clifton Road (State Route 80) – Gatton	T intersection
Queensland	Southern Downs	Glengallan	188	117	Cunningham Highway (A15 east) – Ipswich, Warwick	Northern concurrency terminus with route A15/National Route 42, New England/Cunningham Highways at directional T interchange Northern terminus of National Route 42, southern terminus of route A3
Queensland	Condamine River		199	124	O.O. Madsen Bridge	
Queensland	Southern Downs	Warwick	202	126	Cunningham Highway (National Route 42 west) – Goondiwindi	Southern concurrency terminus with route A15/National Route 42, New England/Cunningham Highways at 4-way intersection National Route 42 continues west as Cunningham Highway
Queensland	Southern Downs	Stanthorpe	258	160	High Street – Stanthorpe, to Texas Road (State Route 89) – Texas	T intersection
State border			299	186	Queensland – New South Wales state border	
New South Wales	Tenterfield	Tenterfield	313	194	Bruxner Way – Yetman, Boggabilla	
New South Wales	Tenterfield	Tenterfield	318	198	Bruxner Highway (B60) – Casino, Lismore, Ballina	
New South Wales	Deepwater River		370	230	Bridge over the river (no known name)	
New South Wales	Glen Innes Severn	Glen Innes	409	254	Gwydir Highway (B76) – Inverell, Warialda, Moree, Grafton	Uncontrolled 4-way intersection
New South Wales	Armidale	Armidale	511	318	Waterfall Way (B78) – Ebor, Raleigh	Roundabout
New South Wales	Armidale	Bendemeer	576	358	Oxley Highway (B56 east) – Walcha, Wauchope, Port Macquarie	Concurrency with route B56
New South Wales	Tamworth	Tamworth	616	383	Oxley Highway (B56 west) – Gunnedah, Coonabarabran, to Manilla Road (B95) – Manilla, Warialda	Concurrency with route B56
New South Wales	Peel River		616	383	Bridge over the river (no known name)	
New South Wales	Liverpool Plains	Willow Tree	687	427	Kamilaroi Highway (B51) – Gunnedah, Narrabri, Walgett, Bourke	Directional T interchange
New South Wales	Pages River		707	439	Bridge over the river (no known name)	
New South Wales	Pages River		710	440	Bridge over the river (no known name)	
New South Wales	Pages River		714	444	Bridge over the river (no known name)	
New South Wales	Hunter River		759	472	Fitzgerald Bridge	
New South Wales	Muswellbrook	Muswellbrook	773	480	Denman Road – Denman	T intersection
New South Wales	Hunter River		819	509	Bridge over the river (no known name)	
New South Wales	Singleton	Singleton	820	510	Campbell Street, to Putty Road – Putty, Windsor	Four-way intersection
New South Wales	Singleton	Whittingham	831	516	Golden Highway (B84) – Denman, Merriwa, Dunedoo, Dubbo	Route transition: A15 northwest, M15 east
New South Wales	Singleton	Belford	839	521	Hunter Expressway (M15) – West Wallsend, Newcastle	Route transition: M15 continues southeast along Hunter Expressway, unallocated east Incomplete access to/from New England Highway east
New South Wales	Singleton	Branxton	842	523	Clift Street, to Wine Country Drive (B82) – Rothbury, Pokolbin, Cessnock	T intersection
New South Wales	Singleton	Branxton	844	524	Wine Country Drive (A43 south), to Hunter Expressway (M15) – Singleton, Newcastle	Route transition: unallocated west, A43 east
New South Wales	Maitland	Maitland	866	538	Cessnock Road – Kurri Kurri, Cessnock	Roundabout
New South Wales	Newcastle	Beresfield	878	546	John Renshaw Drive (A1) – Raymond Terrace, Taree, Coffs Harbour, Brisbane	Directional T interchange; no right turn westwards into John Renshaw Drive; Western terminus of concurrency terminus with route A1
New South Wales	Newcastle	Tarro	879	546	Pacific Motorway (M1) – Taree, Coffs Harbour, Brisbane	Eastbound entrance and westbound exit only Under construction as part of Pacific Motorway extension to Raymond Terrace project, expected completion 2028
New South Wales	Newcastle	Hexham	883	549	Pacific Highway (A1 east, A43 south) – Newcastle, Raymond Terrace, Taree, Coffs Harbour, Brisbane	Southern terminus of highway, route A43 continues south along Pacific Highway; Eastern terminus of concurrency terminus with route A1
1.000 mi = 1.609 km; 1.000 km = 0.621 mi: Concurrency terminus; Incomplete access; Route transition; Unopened

== Cities and towns ==
From its junction with Pacific Highway at Hexham, 12 km (7 mi) inland from Newcastle, New England Highway connects the following cities and towns:

=== New South Wales ===
- Maitland
- Singleton
- Muswellbrook
- Scone
- Murrurundi
- Quirindi
- Tamworth
- Armidale
- Glen Innes
- Deepwater
- Tenterfield

=== Queensland ===
- Wallangarra
- Stanthorpe
- Warwick
- Toowoomba

== Tourism ==
The New England Highway is a popular drive tourism route for visitors travelling between Newcastle and Toowoomba to experience the highway's changing mix of natural environments, heritage, culture, cuisine and landscapes.

Some key attractions along the New England Highway include:

- Maitland Regional Gallery
- The Australian Army Infantry Museum, Singleton
- Hunter Warbirds, Scone
- Muswellbrook Regional Arts Centre
- Michael Reid Murrurundi
- Tamworth Regional Gallery
- Australian Country Music Hall of Fame, Tamworth
- McCrossin's Mill Museum, Uralla
- Saumarez Homestead, Armidale
- New England Regional Art Museum, Armidale
- Glen Innes Standing Stones
- Tenterfield Saddler
- Wallangarra Railway Station
- Stanthorpe Regional Art Gallery
- Glengallen Homestead, Stanthorpe
- Australian Rodeo Heritage Centre, Warwick
- Darling Downs Zoo, Toowoomba
- Toowoomba Regional Art Gallery
- Cobb & Co. Museum, Toowoomba

Communities along the New England Highway also host a range of major events and activities to attract visitors including significant national events like the annual Scone Literary Festival, Tamworth Country Music Festival, Seasons of New England, Armidale Autumn Festival, The Big Chill Festival, The Australian Celtic Festival and Toowoomba Carnival of Flowers.

== See also ==
- Highways in Australia
- List of highways in New South Wales
- List of highways in Queensland
- Moonbi Range
- Hunter Expressway
- List of highways numbered 85
