= Clifton, Queensland =

Town in Queensland, Australia

Clifton
- Town
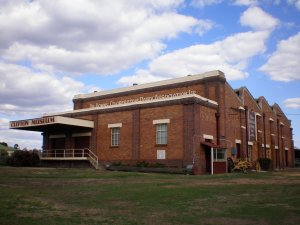
- The Old Clifton Butter Factory, 2007. Now demolished.

- Interactive map of Clifton
- Coordinates: 27.9325°S 151.9055°E
- Country: Australia
- State: Queensland
- LGA: Toowoomba Region
- Location: 17.3 km (10.7 mi) NW of Allora; 45.1 km (28.0 mi) NNW of Warwick; 45.7 km (28.4 mi) S of Toowoomba; 159 km (99 mi) SW of Brisbane
- Established: 1840

Government
  - State electorate: Condamine
  - Federal division: Maranoa

Area
  - Total: 45.9 km^{2} (17.7 sq mi)

Population
  - Total: 1,490 (2021 census)
  - Density: 32.46/km^{2} (84.1/sq mi)
- Time zone: UTC+10:00 (AEST)
- Postcode: 4361
Localities around Clifton
Kings Creek	Kings Creek	Missen Flat
Ryeford	Clifton	Headington Hill
Sandy Camp	Elphinstone	Spring Creek

Clifton is a rural town and locality in the Toowoomba Region, Queensland, Australia. In the 2021 census, the locality of Clifton had a population of 1,490 people.

== Geography ==
Clifton is a town in the Darling Downs. The town is situated just west of the New England Highway, about 50 kilometres (31 mi) south of Toowoomba and 150 kilometres (93 mi) west of Brisbane.

Bange's Airfield, six kilometres west of Clifton, is a centre for ultralight aircraft, and home to the Lone Eagle Flying School and the Darling Downs Sport Aircraft Association Inc. Boab trees are an important cultural heritage feature, particularly alongside the main street.

The New England Highway runs along the eastern boundary. Gatton–Clifton Road enters from the east, Felton-Clifton Road enters from the north, and Clifton-Leyburn Road exits to the west.

The South Western railway line enters the locality from the north (Kings Creek), passes through the centre of town, and exits to the south (Elphinstone). The town is served by the Clifton railway station (27.9308°S 151.9064°E).

== History ==
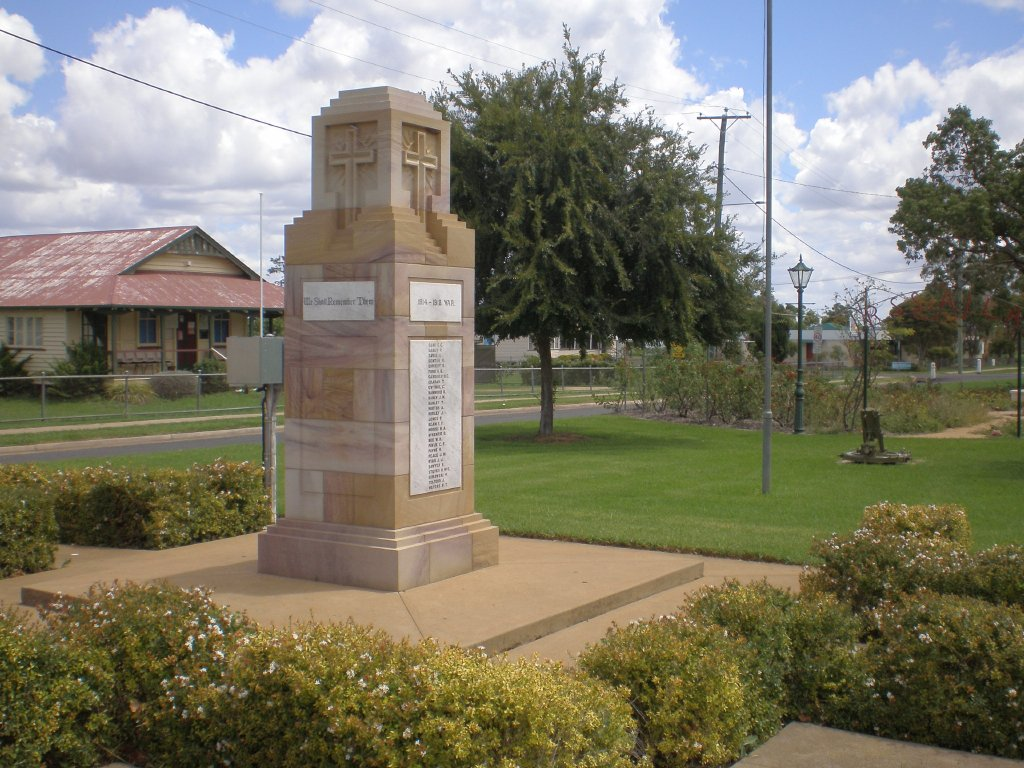
Clifton War Memorial, 2008

The lands around the town was first settled by Europeans in 1840. The town takes its name from a pastoral run named by John Augustus Milbourne Marsh around 1844.

Clifton Post Office opened on 20 April 1869 (it was known as King's Creek for a short period in 1869).

In 1877, 6,000 acres (2,400 ha) were resumed from the Clifton pastoral run and offered for selection on 17 April 1877.

Clifton Colliery Provisional School opened on 11 December 1876. It became Clifton Colliery State School on 7 October 1878. It closed in 1936.

Clifton Homestead Area State School opened circa 1879 and closed circa 1918.

An undated map shows allotments for sale in the township of King's Creek, situated on the Clifton Estate. The allotments were adjacent to the railway line, close to King's Creek railway station, and King's Creek. An article in the Darling Downs Gazette on 20 June 1885 notes the sale of allotments at the new township of King's Creek.

On Sunday 21 October 1888, the Roman Catholic Church of St James and St John was consecrated by Bishop Robert Dunne.

A Presbyterian church was built in the town in 1890. However, the building became too small for the congregation, so on Wednesday 18 November 1908, there was a stump-capping ceremony for a new Presbyterian church building capable of seating 250 people. St Andrew's Presbyterian Church opened on Wed 3 March 1909. It was described as a "striking and substantial edifice".

The foundation stone for All Saints' Anglican Church was laid by Mrs H. Fisher of Headington Hill with an address by the Anglican Bishop of Brisbane William Webber on Thursday 14 March 1889. It was dedicated later in 1889. In 1905 it was re-built and re-dedicated.

Clifton State School opened on 19 September 1892. On 28 January 1964 it opened a secondary department, an arrangement which continued until Clifton State High School opened on 24 January 1966.

On Sunday 22 April 1900, the new Roman Catholic church opened at Clifton beside the old church. The ceremony was conducted by Bishop Robert Dunne and was attended by over 2,000 people, many of whom travelled by special trains arranged by the Queensland Railways Department.

In 1900, a Methodist Church was built in Clifton at a cost of £192 or £196. It had closed before 2003. It was at 17 Queen Street (27.9315°S 151.9084°E).

St Francis De Sales' Catholic School was officially opened on 25 February 1917 by Archbishop James Duhig. It was initially operated by four Sisters of the Good Samaritan. The original Clifton Catholic Church was moved to Tooth Street and was renovated to become the school. In 1979 the Sisters ceased to operate the school and it is now under lay leadership.

The Clifton War Memorial is located on the corner of King and Edward Streets.

On Tuesday 4 April 2000, a memorial was erected to Australian country music singer-songwriter Stan Coster in Centenary Park.

The Clifton Library opened in 2002.

== Demographics ==
In the 2016 census, the locality of Clifton had a population of 1,456 people.

In the 2021 census, the locality of Clifton had a population of 1,490 people.

== Education ==
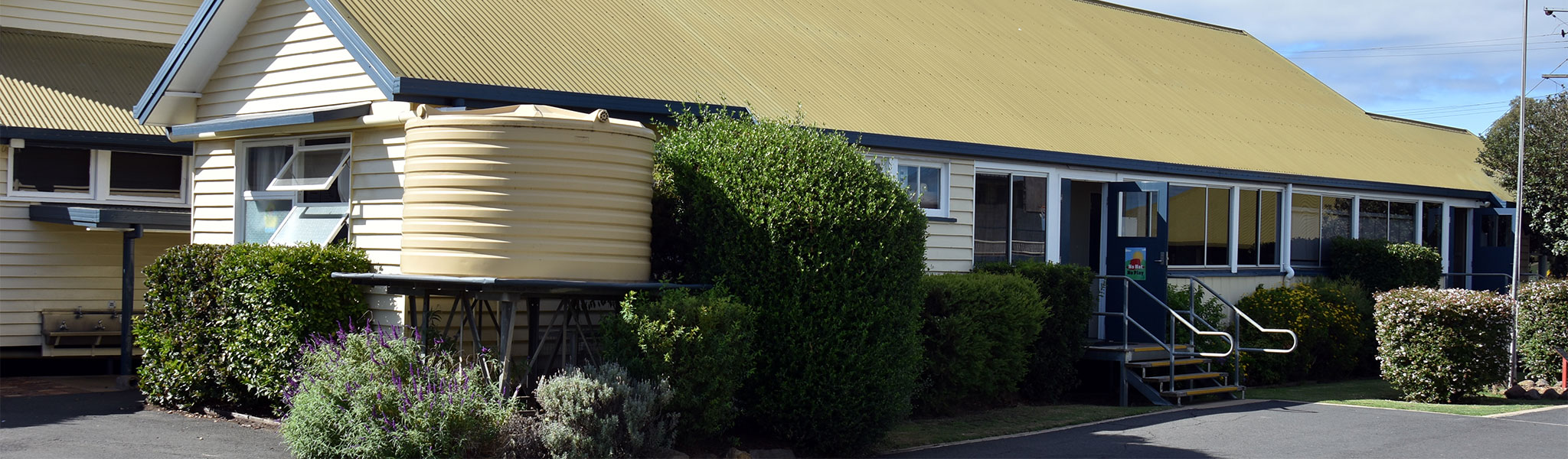
Clifton State School, 2024

Clifton State School is a government primary (Prep–6) school for boys and girls at 1 Tooth Street (27.9317°S 151.9042°E). In 2017, the school had an enrolment of 100 students with 10 teachers (8 full-time equivalent) and 10 non-teaching staff (5 full-time equivalent).

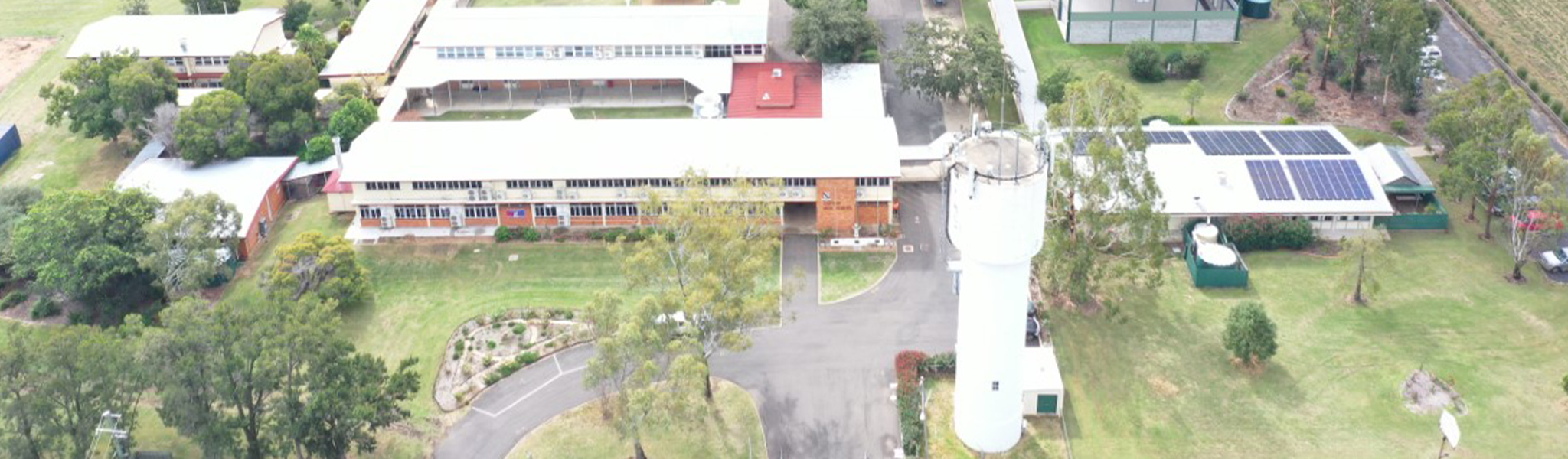
Clifton State High School, 2024

Clifton State High School is a government secondary (7–12) school for boys and girls at 32 East Street (27.9339°S 151.9168°E). In 2017, the school had an enrolment of 240 students with 30 teachers (27 full-time equivalent) and 17 non-teaching staff (13 full-time equivalent). Clifton Cluster Special Education Program is a primary and secondary (Prep–12) special education program at Clifton State High School at 32 East Street (27.9339°S 151.9168°E).

St Francis De Sales School is a Catholic primary (Prep–6) school for boys and girls at 16 Meara Place (27.9287°S 151.9042°E). In 2017, the school had an enrolment of 53 students with 7 teachers (5 full-time equivalent) and 4 non-teaching staff (3 full-time equivalent).

== Amenities ==
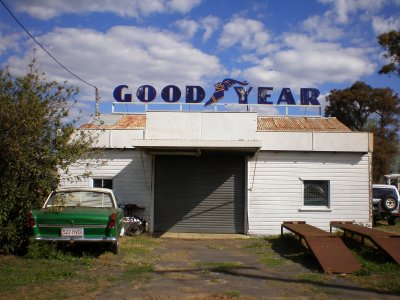
Old Clifton garage.

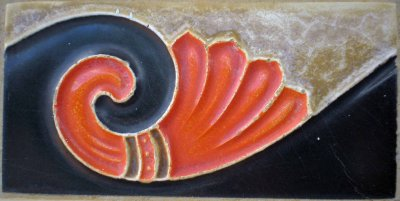
Vitruvian scroll tile, main street, Clifton.

The Clifton Library is operated by the Toowoomba Regional Council. The library is located on Meara Place and is open five days a week (Tuesday through Saturday).

The Clifton branch of the Queensland Country Women's Association meets at 72 Clark Street.

All Saints' Anglican Church is at 72 East Street (27.9330°S 151.9116°E).

St James' and St John's Catholic Church (also known as the Mowen Memorial Church) is at 11 Meara Place (27.9292°S 151.9045°E).

St Andrew's Presbyterian Church is at 14 John Street (27.9297°S 151.9091°E). It is part of the Presbyterian Church of Queensland.

== Attractions ==
The Clifton Historical Museum was located in the old butter factory where there is a range of early agricultural tools and machinery on display. It is staffed by volunteers.

A memorial to Australian country music singer-songwriter Stan Coster is in Centenary Park, Mowen Street (27.9322°S 151.9053°E).
