= Nindigully Pub =

Building in Queensland, Australia

Coordinates: 28°21′14″S 148°49′15″E

The Nindigully Hotel
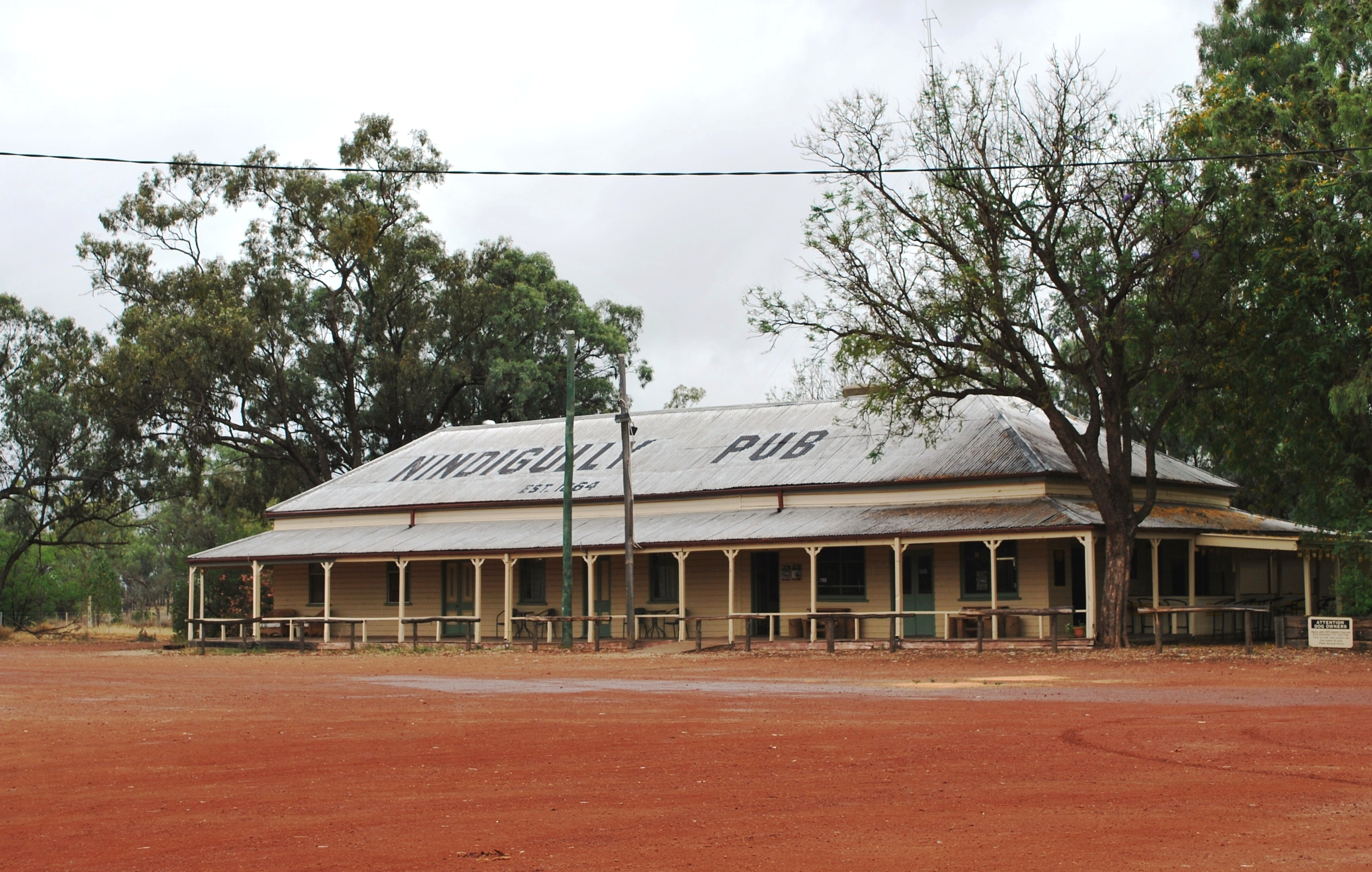
- Interactive map of the The Nindigully Hotel area

General information
- Opened: 1864

The Nindigully Pub, originally built in 1864 in the town of Nindigully within the locality of Thallon, Shire of Balonne, Queensland, Australia.

== History ==
The hotel is sometimes claimed to be one of Queensland's longest continually licensed premises, but the license was actually surrendered by John Sparkes in 1904 and renewed 8 years later for a brand new building, which remains the current hotel. It was a Cobb & Co changing station between the late 19th century and the early 20th century.

== Events ==
The Nindigully Pig Races and Country Music Festival, and fireworks are held annually on the last Saturday in November at the pub. It raises money for the Royal Flying Doctor Service.

== Filming ==
In the 1990s, scenes from Paperback Hero starring Hugh Jackman and Claudia Karvan were filmed on location at the Nindigully Pub.

== See also ==
- List of public houses in Australia
