= Daymar =

Daymar may refer to:

- Daymar, Queensland, Australia, a rural town
- Daymar College, Nashville, Tennessee, United States
