= Bullamon Homestead =

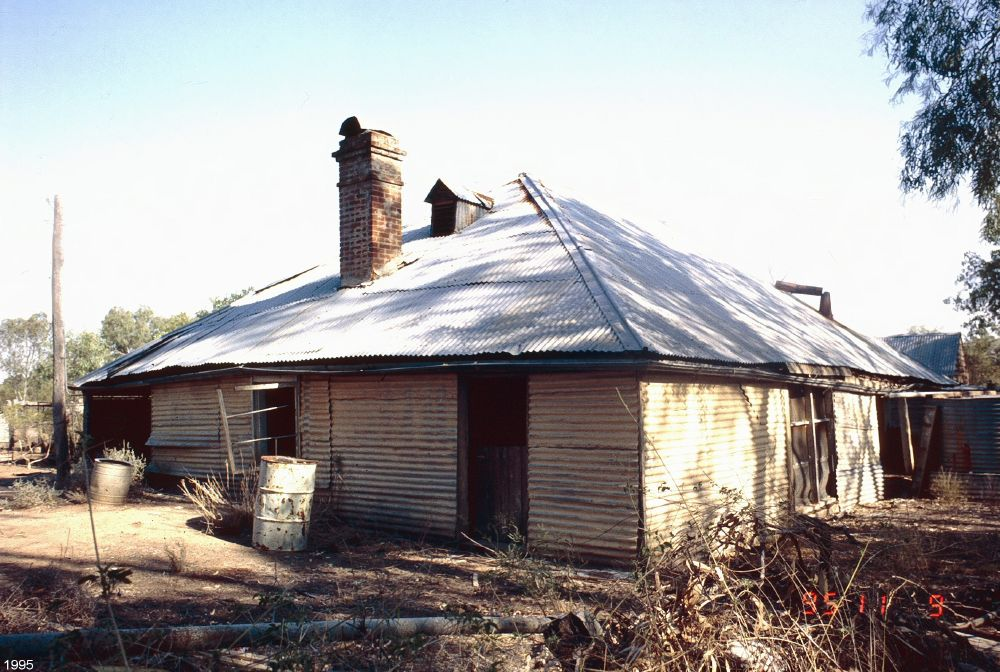
- Bullamon Homestead, 1995

- Location within Queensland
- 28.6455°S 148.8563°E
- Location: Moonie River, Thallon, Shire of Balonne, Queensland, Australia

History
- Design period: 1840s - 1860s (mid-19th century)
- Built: 1860s circa - 1880s circa

Queensland Heritage Register
- Official name: Bullamon Homestead, Gerar
- Type: state heritage (archaeological, landscape, built)
- Designated: 2 June 1996
- Reference no.: 601683
- Significant period: 1860s-1890s (historical); 1860s-1880s (fabric) ongoing (social)
- Significant components: residential accommodation - main house, out house, tank stand, graveyard, out building/s, bathroom/bathhouse, garden/grounds

Bullamon Homestead is a heritage-listed homestead at Moonie River, Thallon, Shire of Balonne, Queensland, Australia. It was built from 1860s circa to 1880s circa. It is also known as Gerar. It was added to the Queensland Heritage Register on 2 June 1996.

== History ==
Bullamon Homestead, on the Moonie River 1 kilometre (0.62 mi) southwest of Thallon, was established by the early 1860s, being marked on Surveyor Francis Thomas Gregory's map of the district drawn in April 1864. In the 1880s Bullamon was head station for the largest aggregation of leases ever recorded in Balonne Shire. The name is understood to mean "biggest waterhole", and the homestead is located on a large sandy ridge above the Moonie River.

Scattered settlement had spread north from the Liverpool Plains to the Moonie River area as early as the mid-1840s. The Maranoa, a vast area of first-class grazing land watered by the Moonie, Balonne, Narran and Culgoa rivers, was gazetted a pastoral district in 1848, following Sir Thomas Mitchell's exploration of the area in 1845–46. A grab for land ensued and by 1862, the whole of the Maranoa had been taken up as pastoral runs.

Bullamon Homestead was erected on Gerar, a small sheep run of just over 20 square miles, first leased to Richard Bligh in 1857, but transferred in 1859 and again in 1860, before taken up by Leonard McKay in 1864. In 1866 the lease was transferred to John McKay & James McCormick. Duncan Forbes McKay, grazier, and his young family were resident at Bullamon by at least October 1866, and it is likely the log house had been constructed by this time. By 1868 Bullamon Homestead supported the McKay family, an overseer, 4 drovers, 2 contractors (probably ringbarking or fencing), a storekeeper and a blacksmith. The lease was transferred to DF McKay in 1873, by which time he also owned Nindi-gully homestead on the Ana Ninghan East run on the Moonie River, north of Gerar, and held the leases to several other runs in the area and along the Culgoa River. By 1874 McKay was based at Nindi-gully, and his general manager, William Turnbull, occupied Bullamon Homestead. About 1876 James Hill replaced Turnbull as manager at Bullamon, and two of his infant sons who died in 1877 and 1882 lie buried near the house.

In 1880 McKay sold the Gerar lease and Bullamon Homestead to Hurtle Fisher of Melbourne. In the early 1880s, Melbourne brothers Charles Brown and Hurtle Fisher, who already held extensive pastoral leases in South Australia, Victoria, and the Darling Downs, purchased the leases of various small Maranoa runs totalling over 2 million acres, known locally as "Fisher Country". Although not in partnership (Charles operated his Queensland interests as CB Fisher & Co. and Hurtle was in partnership with James Hill of Adelaide as Fisher & Hill) Charles backed Fisher & Hill financially.

The largest of their aggregations in what later became Balonne Shire was Fisher & Hill's Bullamon. When consolidated in July 1888 under the provisions of the 1884 Crown Lands Act, Bullamon comprised 42 runs in the Moonie River area and totalled approximately 878,720 acres (355,610 ha). Bullamon Homestead was the head station for this group, with buildings valued at £2,000 in September 1887. There were two outstations: Nindi-gully on Ana Ninghan East run and Bandy Andy on Minimi. Following consolidation the property was divided, with nearly 780 square miles resumed for grazing farms and 593 square miles, including Bullamon Homestead, retained by Fisher & Hill as leasehold.

The Fishers had bought into the Maranoa in the early 1880s during good seasons. However, severe drought in 1883–84 followed by widespread depression in the pastoral industry post-1885, forced CB Fisher to float the Fisher brothers' Queensland properties as the Australian Pastoral Company Limited in England in 1888. By 1890 the Company controlled all the Fishers' vast Maranoa holdings: Noondoo (over 790,000 acres (320,000 ha)); Cubbie (over 413,000 acres (167,000 ha)); Gnoolooma (over 218,000 acres (88,000 ha)); Doondi (over 635,000 acres (257,000 ha)); and largest of all, Bullamon, acquired in January 1889, to which was added Hollymount, Burgorah, Weeyan and Wagoo (totalling 1,044,000 acres (422,000 ha)). During the 1890s, the Company ran up to 1,000,000 sheep and operated 7 big shearing sheds and 3 woolscours on "The Group". The general manager resided at Noondoo Homestead, which was more central to the Company's holdings than Bullamon. In the early 1890s the Company made substantial improvements, including re-roofing a number of Bullamon buildings with corrugated iron.

Of all the Australian Pastoral Company's holdings, the Bullamon aggregation was most prone to flood, drought and prickly pear, and made constant losses through the 1890s and early 1900s. Floods in 1890 sent 1.3 metres (4 ft 3 in) of water through the Bullamon Homestead residence and drowned 60,000 of the leasehold's 125,000 sheep. After the 1902 drought Bullamon was shut down and remained unstocked until seasonal conditions improved.

Small resumptions were made in the 1890s and in 1904 a further 133 square miles was taken. In 1910 the St George Progress Association requested that the government resume all of Bullamon, much of which was thickly infested with prickly pear, for closer settlement. In 1914, 200 square miles was surrendered to the government, leaving the Australian Pastoral Co. with 240 square miles, most of which had been ringbarked and kept free of prickly pear. By the 1960s all of the Bullamon leasehold had been converted to grazing farms. Bullamon Homestead was acquired in the late 1960s by a new owner, who occupied the c. 1860s residence until 1985.

Before 1911, when the South Western railway line was extended to Thallon, Bullamon was a Cobb & Co stop and stabled horses for them from at least 1898 through to 1912. The homestead was also on the mail service from St George to Mungindi in the early years of the 20th century. Today, the homestead is located on the Carnarvon Highway, the principal highway from New South Wales to St George and western Queensland.

== Description ==
The Bullamon Homestead site extends about 150 metres (490 ft) along the east bank of the Moonie River, and encompasses a residence, associated buildings and foundations, and an extensive garden. The outbuildings include a bath house, tank stand, and out house. There are the remains of a brick drain water reticulation system for the gardens.

The house originally consisted of a two-roomed building of dropped-log construction (probably Cypress pine), with a hipped, shingled roof and verandahs on all sides. This core, with its massive timber uprights, horizontal dropped logs, and shingled roof, survives, and sits on the original bedlogs. Other evidence of early construction includes treenails, adzed timber and an early system for barring the doors with internal metal fittings.

A c. 1890s corrugated iron roof has been placed over the shingle roof, and there are two false dormer vents in the corrugated iron roof near the chimneys of the kitchen and living room.

The interior and some of the exterior walls are lined with wide, horizontal tongue and groove boards, at a later date to the original construction, probably 1870s or 1880s. The living room ceiling is angled above door height matching the angle of the original roofline. Several early doorways are boarded over with the tongue and groove lining and the kitchen has a later flat, boarded ceiling.

A later partition in the northern room, now the lounge room, forms a central hallway. The southern room is a kitchen. There is a brick fireplace and chimney in the north wall of the lounge room and in the south wall of the kitchen. The kitchen fireplace has been replaced with a stove recess containing a Crown wood stove, in the western wall of the kitchen.

Sections of the verandahs have been enclosed variously with corrugated iron, timber and gauze as bedrooms: two rooms on the north verandah, each with a hessian ceiling and one with canvas lining to the walls; an adjacent bedroom on the northern end of the west verandah; a room on the south verandah; and another at the southern end of the east verandah.

There are a number of outbuildings associated with the residence. The bath house, of timber-framed weatherboards with a corrugated iron roof, is a later structure to the residence. There is an early square tank stand nearby. A two-seater weatherboard outhouse has a square pyramid roof of corrugated iron with a wood finial. To the south of the out house is a small burial ground containing the graves of two children buried in 1877 and 1882. Further south are the remains of a gardener's hut. The remains of an extensive garden are visible. Ornamental gardens to the east and north of the house remain along with remnants of the brick irrigation drains which supported a large vegetable garden. North of the house are the possible footings and brick hearth of another early building.

== Heritage listing ==
Bullamon Homestead was listed on the Queensland Heritage Register on 2 June 1996 having satisfied the following criteria.

The place is important in demonstrating the evolution or pattern of Queensland's history.

Bullamon Homestead is important in illustrating the pattern of Queensland history, being closely associated with the establishment of pastoralism in the Moonie River district in the mid-19th century.

The place demonstrates rare, uncommon or endangered aspects of Queensland's cultural heritage.

The residence at Bullamon Homestead offers rare evidence in Queensland of early bush construction technology employing dropped-logs, treenails, adzed timber uprights, bedlogs and shingle roofing.

The place has potential to yield information that will contribute to an understanding of Queensland's history.

Bullamon Homestead has the potential to yield information on other aspects of early settler life and building construction on the Queensland frontier.

The place is important in demonstrating the principal characteristics of a particular class of cultural places.

Bullamon Homestead retains a substantially intact mid-19th century timber residence and evidence of its associated gardens, including a brick irrigation system, and is important in illustrating the principal characteristics of a remote early head station in southwest Queensland. The small, unpretentious, two-roomed timber house, constructed and adapted in the mid-19th century, illustrates its role as a manager's residence as well as the remoteness of the location at the time of construction.

The place has a strong or special association with a particular community or cultural group for social, cultural or spiritual reasons.

Bullamon Homestead has a special association for the local community with the early establishment of pastoralism as the dominant economic activity in the Moonie River district, and features prominently in local histories.

The place has a special association with the life or work of a particular person, group or organisation of importance in Queensland's history.

In particular, the place has a strong association with the important pastoral pursuits of the Fisher brothers and their Australian Pastoral Co. Ltd from the early 1880s to the middle of the 20th century.

== See also ==
- William John Young, a general manager of the London-based Australian Pastoral Co., based at Noondoo station from 1898
