= Paperback Hero (1999 film) =

- DVD cover
- Directed by: Antony Bowman
- Written by: Antony Bowman
- Produced by: Lance W. Reynolds; John Winter
- Starring: Claudia Karvan; Hugh Jackman
- Cinematography: David Burr
- Edited by: Veronika Jenet
- Music by: Burkhard von Dallwitz
- Distributed by: PolyGram Filmed Entertainment
- Release date: 25 March 1999
- Running time: 96 minutes
- Country: Australia
- Language: English
- Budget: $4.5 million
- Box office: $1.4 million (Australia)

Paperback Hero is a 1999 Australian romantic comedy film starring Claudia Karvan and Hugh Jackman. It was directed by Antony Bowman who also wrote the screenplay. The film was predominantly shot in Queensland, including Nindigully and its Nindigully Pub. Other filming locations were Brisbane and Sydney.

== Plot ==
Australian outback truck driver Jack Willis writes a best-selling novel, but because of its romantic content uses a pen name, that of a female friend, Ruby Vale, a cropduster pilot of Lucktown, in country Queensland. When the publisher's publicity officer, Ziggy, arrives, Jack is suddenly faced with a dilemma. He tells Ruby what he has done, and persuades her to play along with his subterfuge, promising to bankroll her wedding to Jack's best friend, the veterinarian Hamish. Hamish, we discover, is a man of few words who does not share Ruby's love of flying. Ziggy offers professional help if the ceremony has a promotional tie-in.

Ruby and Jack drive to Sydney to help promote the book. On the way, Ruby reads his book and realises the lead female character is herself, and the male protagonist, Brian, is Jack. She is deeply touched.

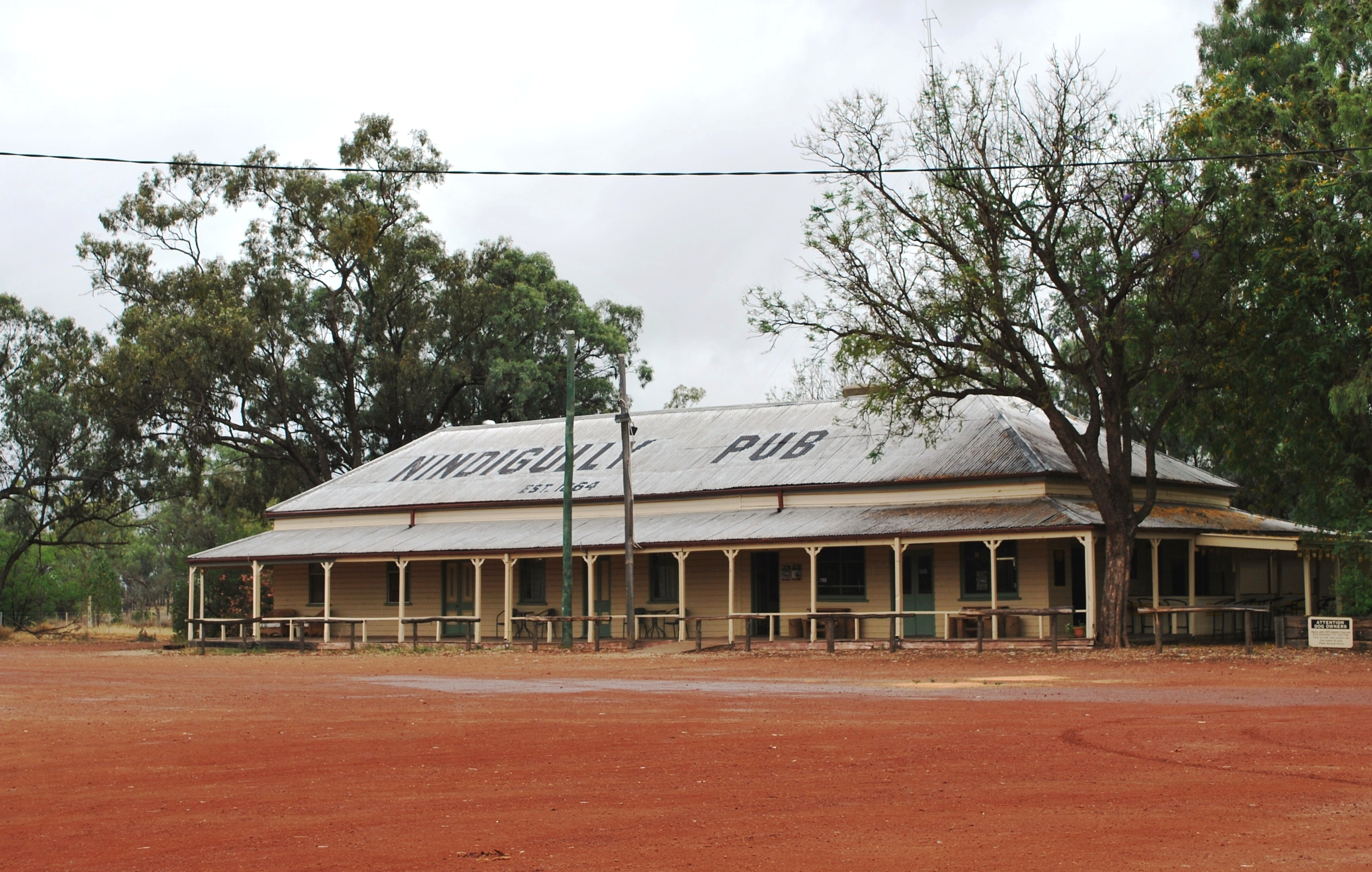
Nindigully Pub

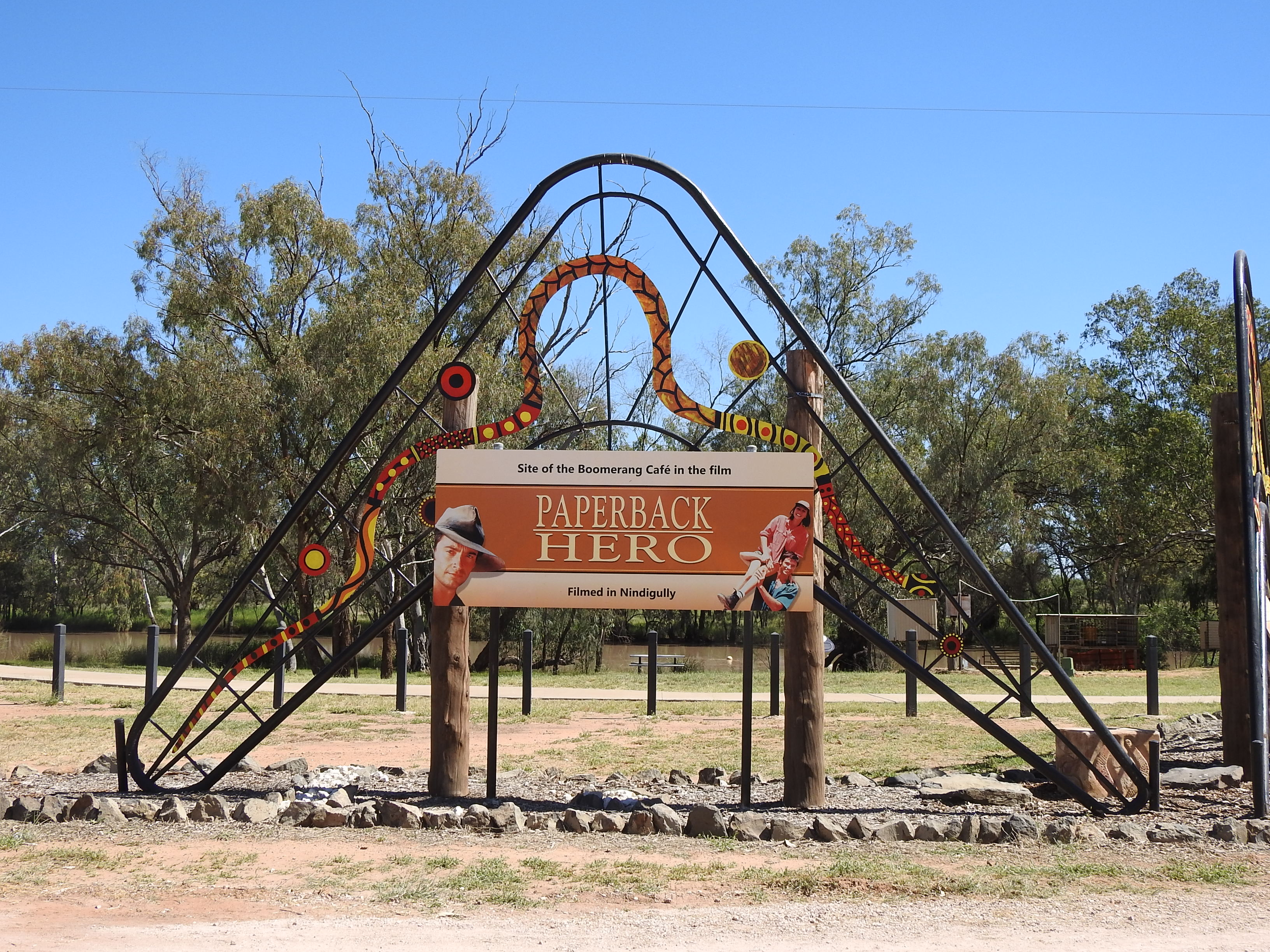
Boomerang indicating the Paperback Hero movie, Nindigully, Shire of Balonne (2021)

In Sydney, Ziggy has guessed the truth and develops a new respect for Jack. During a radio interview to promote the book, which is called Bird in the Hand, Ruby is contacted by her friend Suzie, to let her know that Hamish has guessed the truth. Hamish arrives in Sydney, just before she is about to go on a satellite feed for an interview with Clive Rooney in London. Ziggy accidentally admits she knows the truth. All of this is too much for Ruby and she heads back to Lucktown. She returns to cropdusting, but smashes the Tiger Moth's undercarriage when she swerves to avoid Jacks's dog, "Lance", and breaks her ankle.

Jack does not follow her, instead staying in Sydney while trying to decide. Jack and Ziggy spend a night together, and make tentative plans. Back at the Lucktown pub, Ruby hears Jack's voice coming from the TV. She hears him admit to the London interviewer that he is the book's author, and finally realises Jack's feelings for her. Hamish breaks up with Ruby, knowing she really loves Jack. Ruby uses the book advance to help her friend Suzie buy the Boomerang Cafe.

Ruby is on her way to fetch the now-repaired biplane, and sees a plane overhead, spelling the words "I love you". As she stops her car, Mack's monoplane lands in front of her. Jack, who has overcome a lifelong dread of flying, hops out, and after some gentle sparring of words, they kiss and drive on together.

== Karaoke ==
Short snatches of several Roy Orbison songs are heard in the course of the film, but in a brief karaoke scene on Jack and Ruby's first night in Sydney, Jackman (who has singing credentials), as Jack, gets up on stage and embarks on "Crying". Ruby, not sensing the irony of the words, joins him in harmony but naïvely jumps to the final chorus. Jack smiles indulgently and sings along, comfortably handling the falsetto finale.

== Cast ==
- Hugh Jackman as Jack Willis
- Claudia Karvan as Ruby Vale
- Angie Milliken as Ziggy Keane
- Andrew S. Gilbert as Hamish
- Jeanie Drynan as Suzie
- Tony Barry as Mack
- Diana McLean as Harmony
- Russell Dykstra as Stage hand
- Barry Lea as Policeman
- Ritchie Singer as Ralph

== Reception ==
Reviewing the film on The Movie Show, David Stratton felt the story worked very well for the first half-hour, but was let down by laboured plot developments and a slowed pace from thereon. He did commend Jackman and Karvan for making a great romantic team, and also praised Jeanie Drynan for her performance. He gave the film 2½ stars out of 5. Margaret Pomeranz gave the film a more favourable review and 3½ stars.

Paperback Hero grossed $1,369,280 at the box office in Australia. Simultaneously with the film, Bowman published a novel of the same name based on his script.
