= Nindigully =

Town in Queensland, Australia

- Town
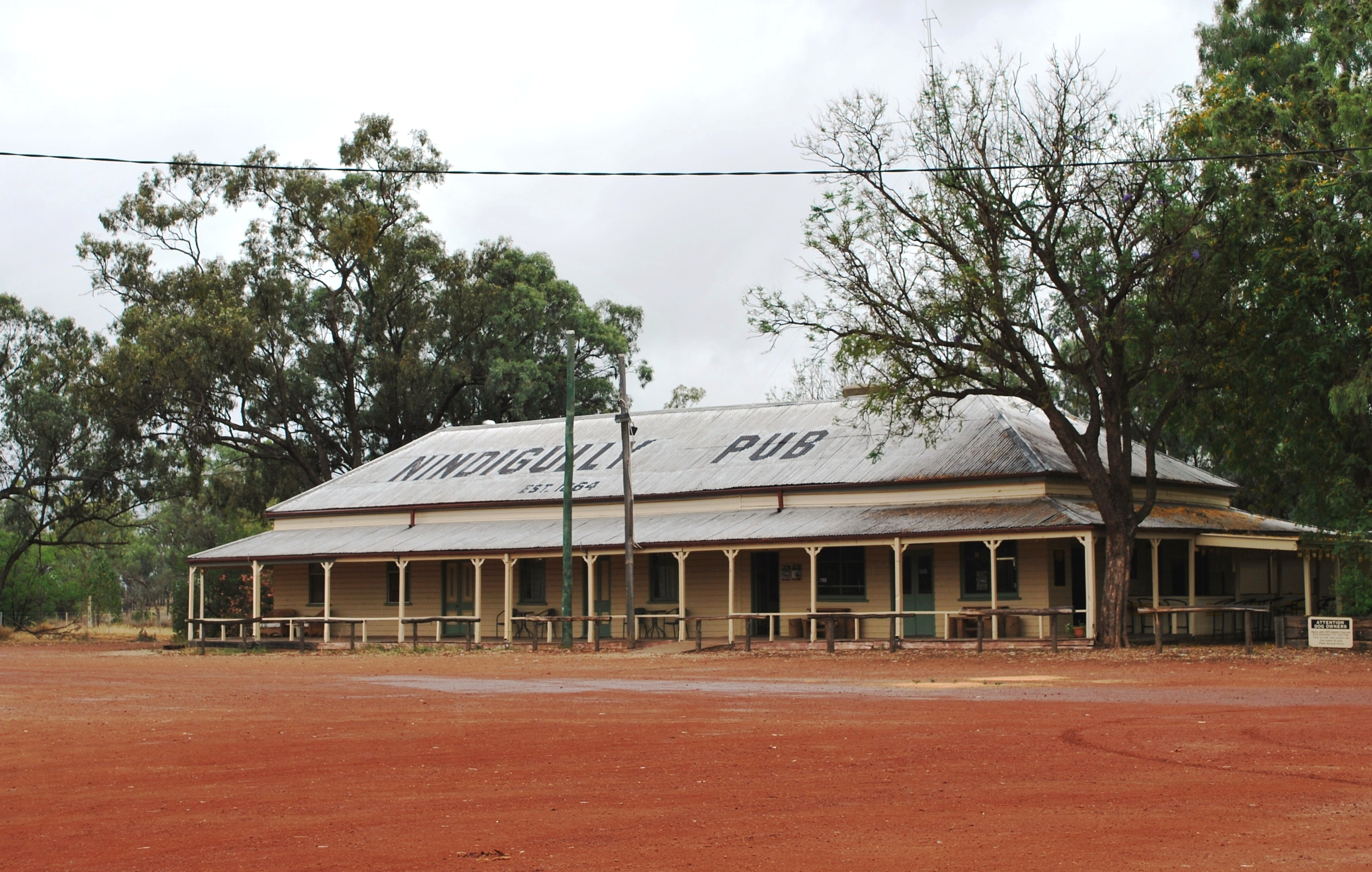
- The Nindigully Pub, built in 1864

- Coordinates: 28.3536°S 148.8219°E
- Country: Australia
- State: Queensland
- LGA: Shire of Balonne
- Location: 32.9 km (20.4 mi) N of Thallon; 46 km (29 mi) SW of St George; 257 km (160 mi) W of Goondiwindi; 507 km (315 mi) WSW of Brisbane

Government
  - State electorate: Warrego
  - Federal division: Maranoa
- Time zone: UTC+10:00 (AEST)
- Postcode: 4497

Nindigully is a rural town within the locality of Thallon in the Shire of Balonne, Queensland, Australia.

== Geography ==
Nindigully is 32.9 kilometres (20.4 mi) north of the town of Thallon, the main town in the locality.

The Moonie River flows south to north passing the town immediately to the west. The Carnarvon Highway passes north to south passing the town immediately to the east; the Barwon Highway has its junction with the Carnarvon Highway to the north-east of the town.

== History ==
The name Nindigully is said to be a combination of an Aboriginal word (nindi meaning small) and the English word gully. The town presumably takes its name from the Nindi Gully pastoral run operated by Mr Baldwin which existed from at least 1862 although often spelt as Nindigually in its early years.

The Nindigully Pub, built in 1864, is believed to be one of Queensland's longest continually licensed premises. It was a Cobb & Co changing station between the late 19th century and the early 20th century.

The town of Nindigully first appears on a 1908 survey plan.

Nindigully Post Office opened by January 1912 (a receiving office had been open from 1909, originally known as Nindi Gully) and closed in 1974.

Nindi Gully State School opened on 6 March 1922. A notable alumnus was Len Waters (1924–1993) who later became Australia's only First Nations fighter pilot. The school closed circa 1941.

The 1999 Australian film Paperback Hero starring Hugh Jackman and Claudia Karvan was filmed at Nindigully.

== Education ==
There are no schools in Nindigully. The nearest government primary school is Thallon State School in the town of Thallon to the south. The nearest government secondary school is St George State High School in St George to the north-west.

== Events ==
The Nindigully Pig Races and Country Music Festival, and fireworks are held annually on the last Saturday in November. It raises money for the Royal Flying Doctor Service.

== Gallery ==
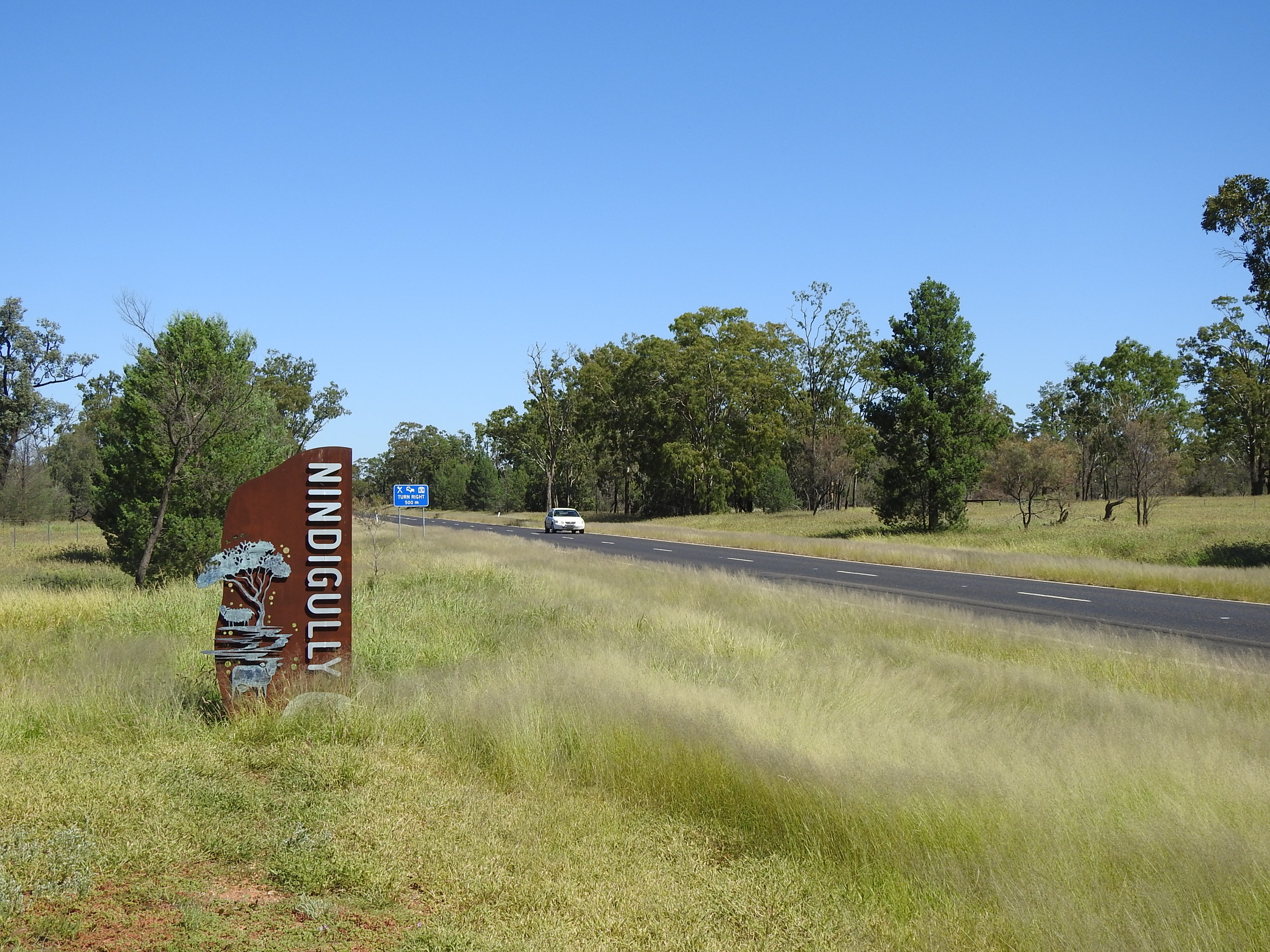
Locality sign (2021).

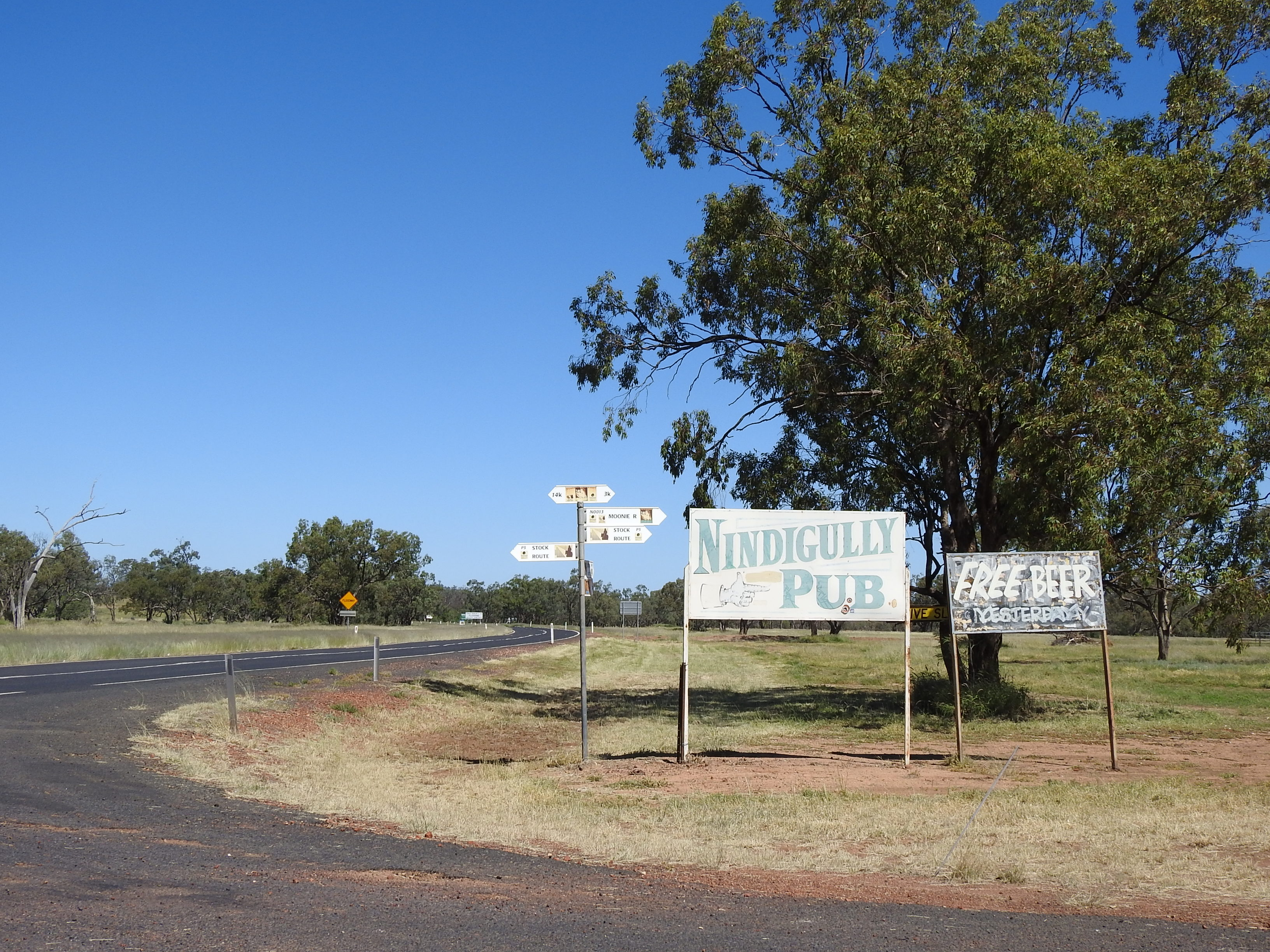
Turn-off sign to public hotel (2021).

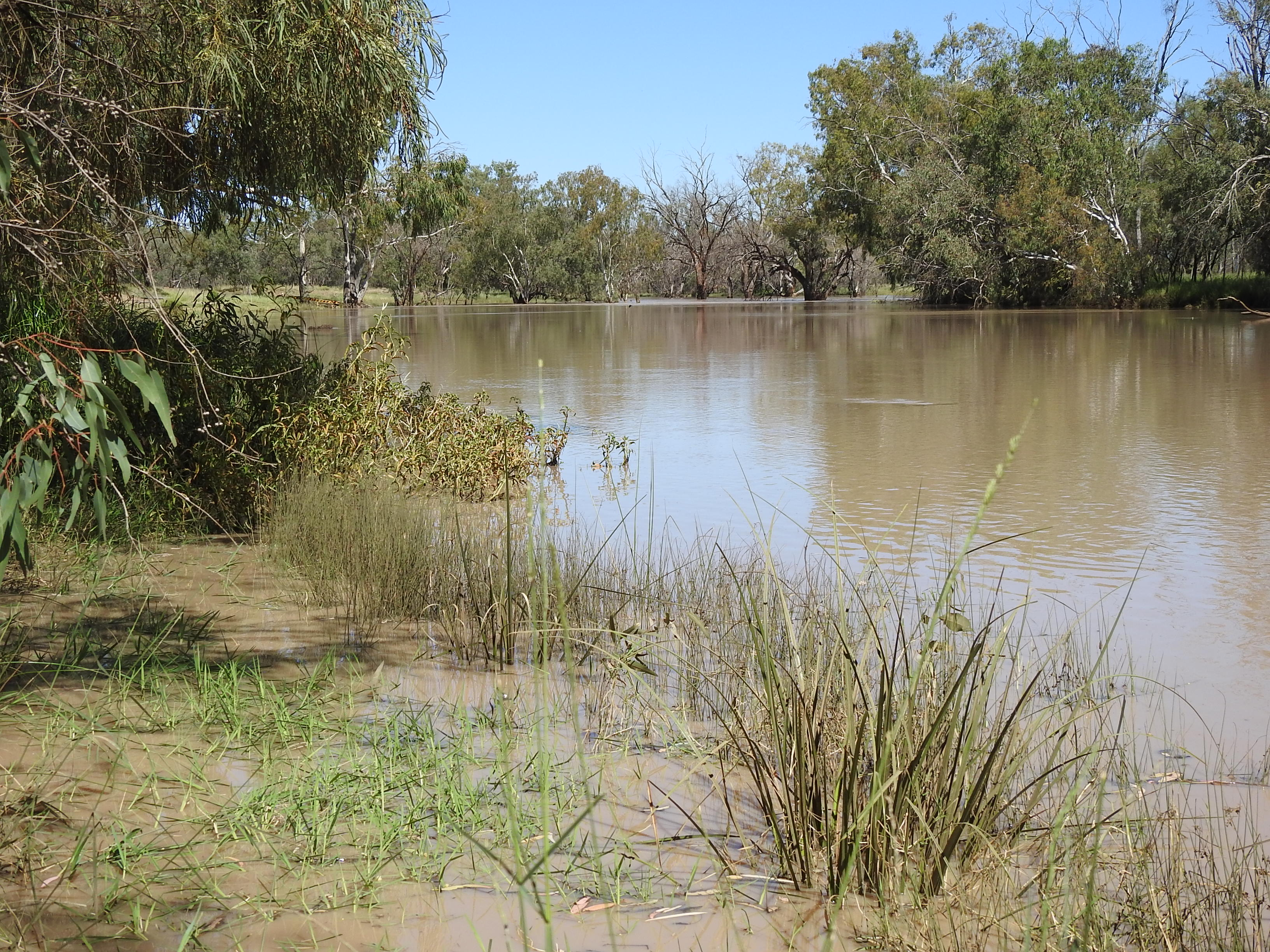
Moonie River in flood, in front of the Nindigully public hotel (2021).

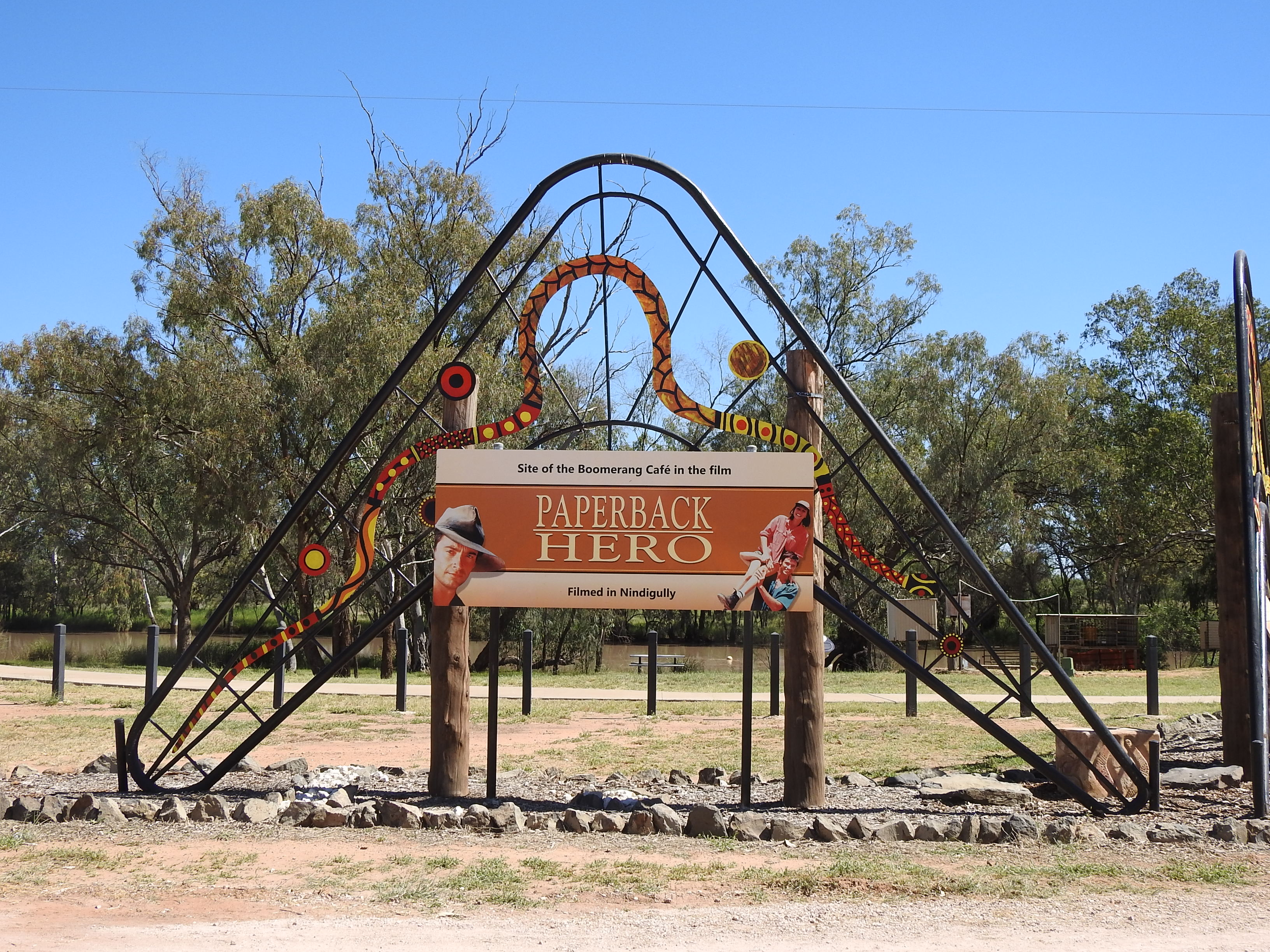
Boomerang indicating the Paperback Hero movie (2021).

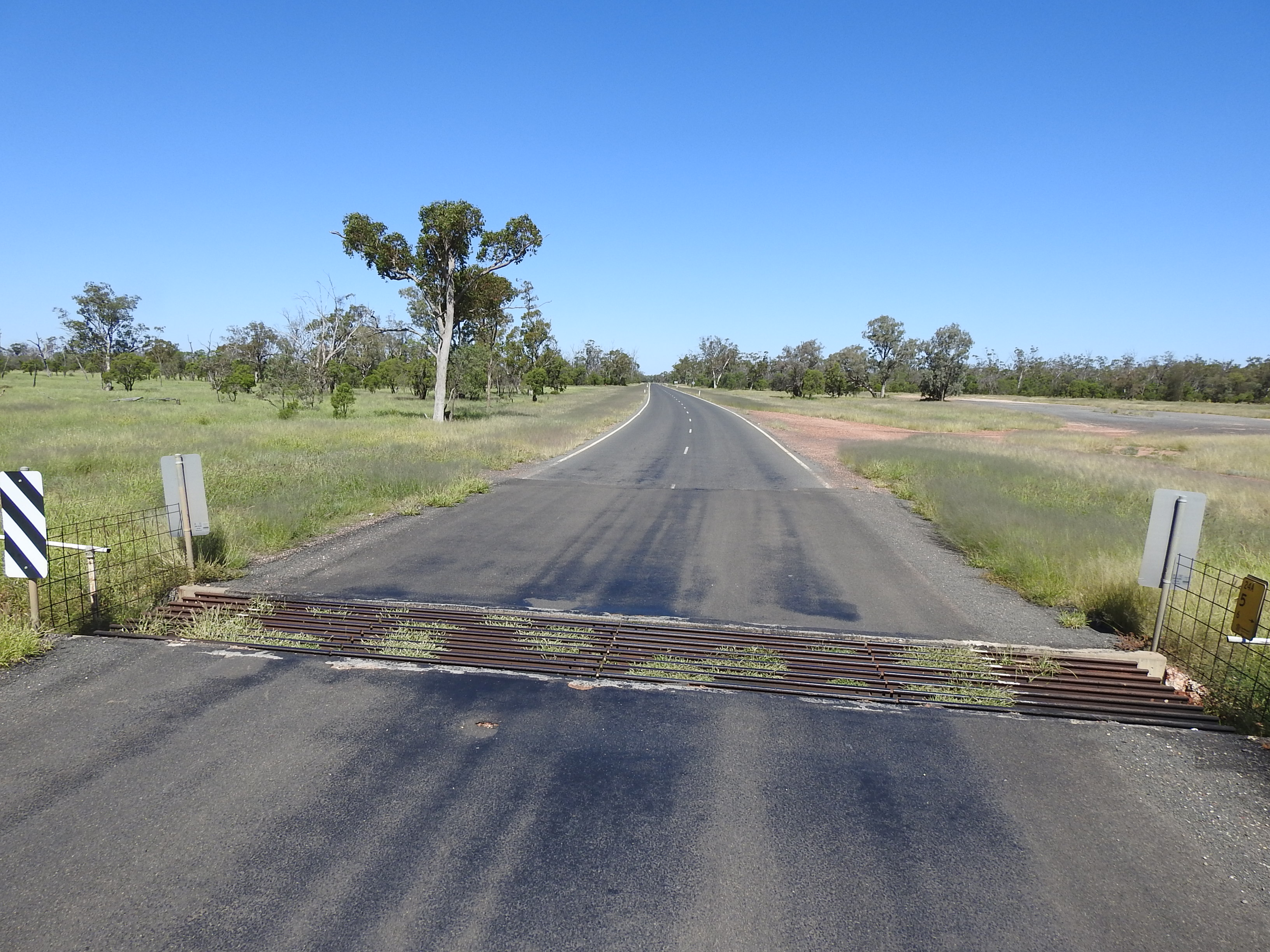
Carnarvon Highway southbound from Nindigully (2021).

== See also ==
- List of public houses in Australia
