= Thallon, Queensland =

Thallon
- Town
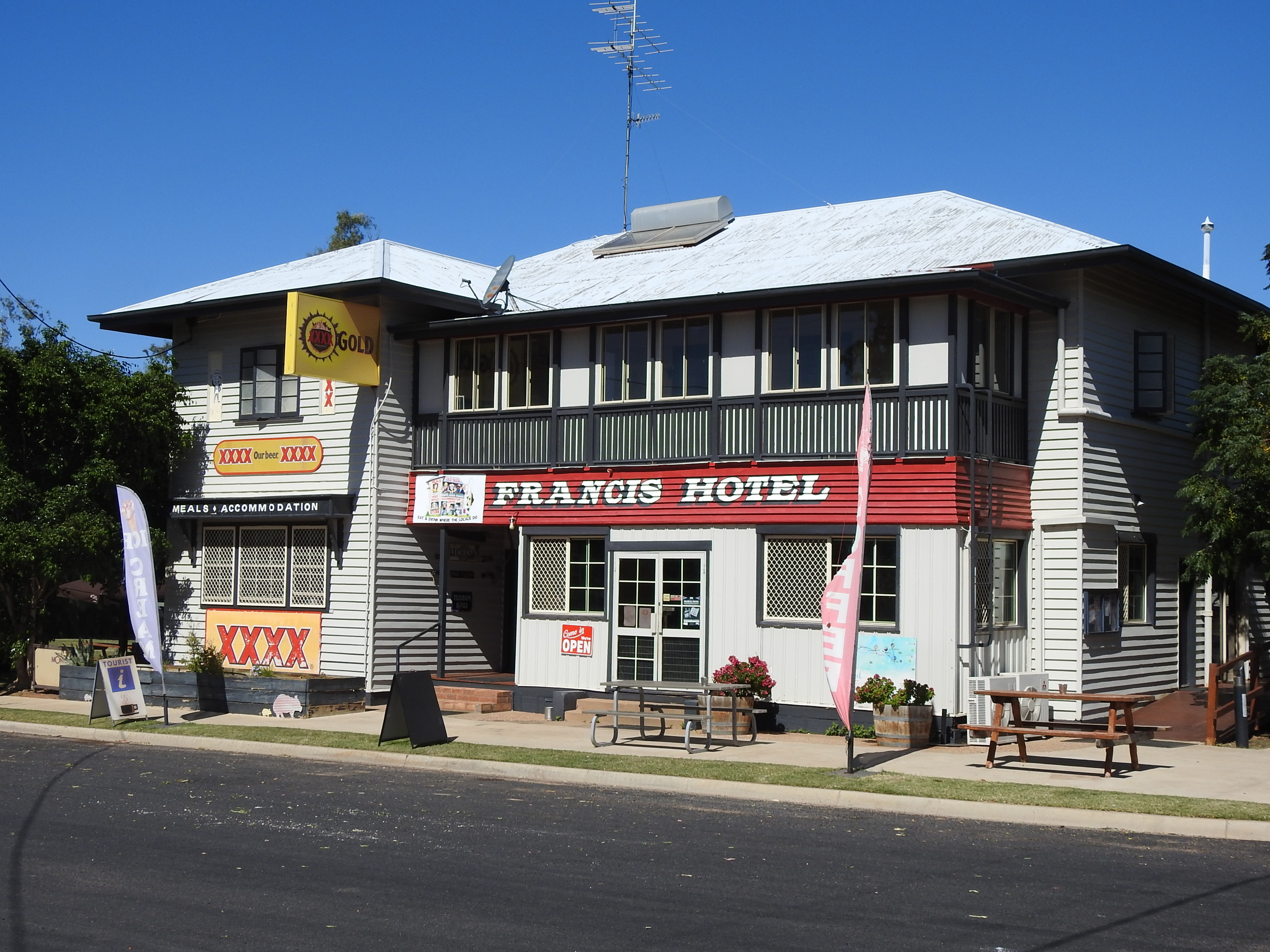
- The Francis Hotel (2021)

- Interactive map of Thallon
- Coordinates: 28.6369°S 148.8691°E
- Country: Australia
- State: Queensland
- LGA: Shire of Balonne
- Location: 78.4 km (48.7 mi) SSE of St George; 166 km (103 mi) W of Goondiwindi; 384 km (239 mi) WSW of Toowoomba; 516 km (321 mi) WSW of Brisbane

Government
  - State electorate: Warrego
  - Federal division: Maranoa

Area
  - Total: 2,093.3 km^{2} (808.2 sq mi)

Population
  - Total: 231 (2021 census)
  - Density: 0.11035/km^{2} (0.2858/sq mi)
- Time zone: UTC+10:00 (AEST)
- Postcode: 4497
Localities around Thallon
St George	St George	Weengallon
Dirranbandi	Thallon	Daymar
Dirranbandi	Mungindi	Mungindi

Thallon is a rural town and locality in the Shire of Balonne, Queensland, Australia. In the 2021 census, the locality of Thallon had a population of 231 people.

There is a second town within the locality, Nindigully.

== Geography ==
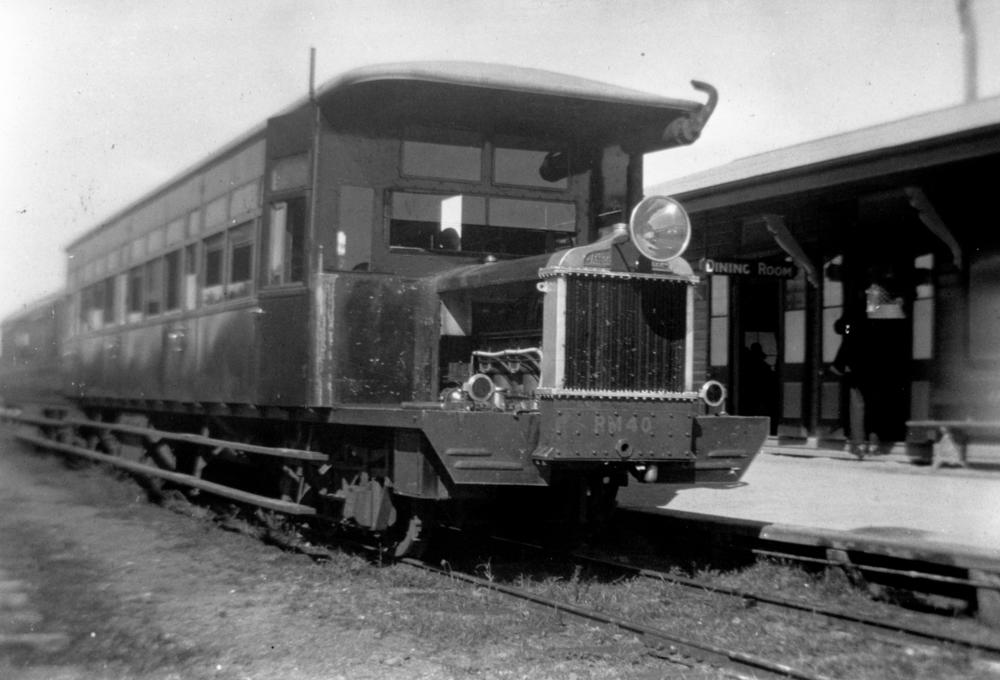
Motor train at Thallon railway station on its way to Warwick, December 1930

Thallon is in South West Queensland, 571 kilometres (355 mi) west of the state capital, Brisbane.

The town is situated in roughly towards the east of the locality. The Moonie River flows from south to north through the locality and just to the west of the town. The Carnarvon Highway passes from north to south through the locality and through the town (as Hill Street) connecting the town to St George to the north and Mungindi on the border with New South Wales. The South-Western railway line passes through the locality from east to west and the town is served for freight rail by the Thallon railway station.

The land use is a mixture of crop growing and grazing on native vegetation. It is a major wheat and woolgrowing area.

== History ==
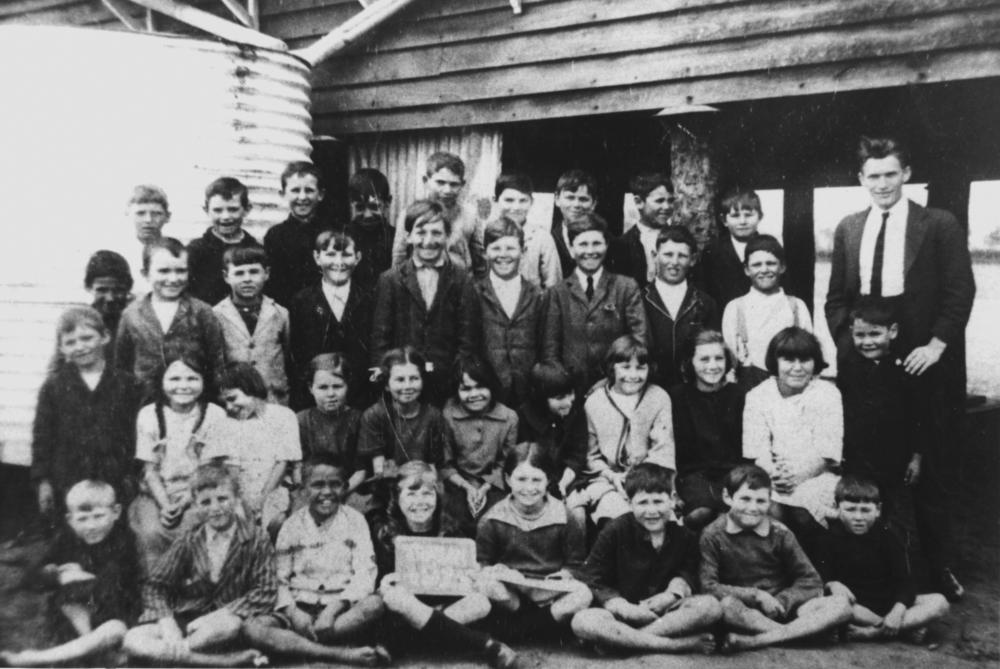
Thallon State School group with teacher Thomas Douglas King, 1923

Gamilaraay (Gamilaroi, Kamilaroi, Comilroy) is a language from South-West Queensland and North-West New South Wales. The Gamilaraay language region includes the landscape within the local government boundaries of the Balonne Shire Council, including the towns of Dirranbandi, Thallon, Talwood and Bungunya as well as the border towns of Mungindi and Boomi extending to Moree, Tamworth and Coonabarabran in NSW.

Explorer Thomas Mitchell was the first European in the Thallon district and his initials can still be found on a bloodwood tree near the Moonie River.

In 1911, the area was set aside for closer settlement and 780 acres (3.2 km^{2}) were gazetted as a town reserve. The town's name comes from its railway station, which in turn was named on 17 January 1911 by the Queensland Railways Department after James Forsyth Thallon (1847-1911) who was the Queensland Commissioner for Railways from 1900 to 1911.

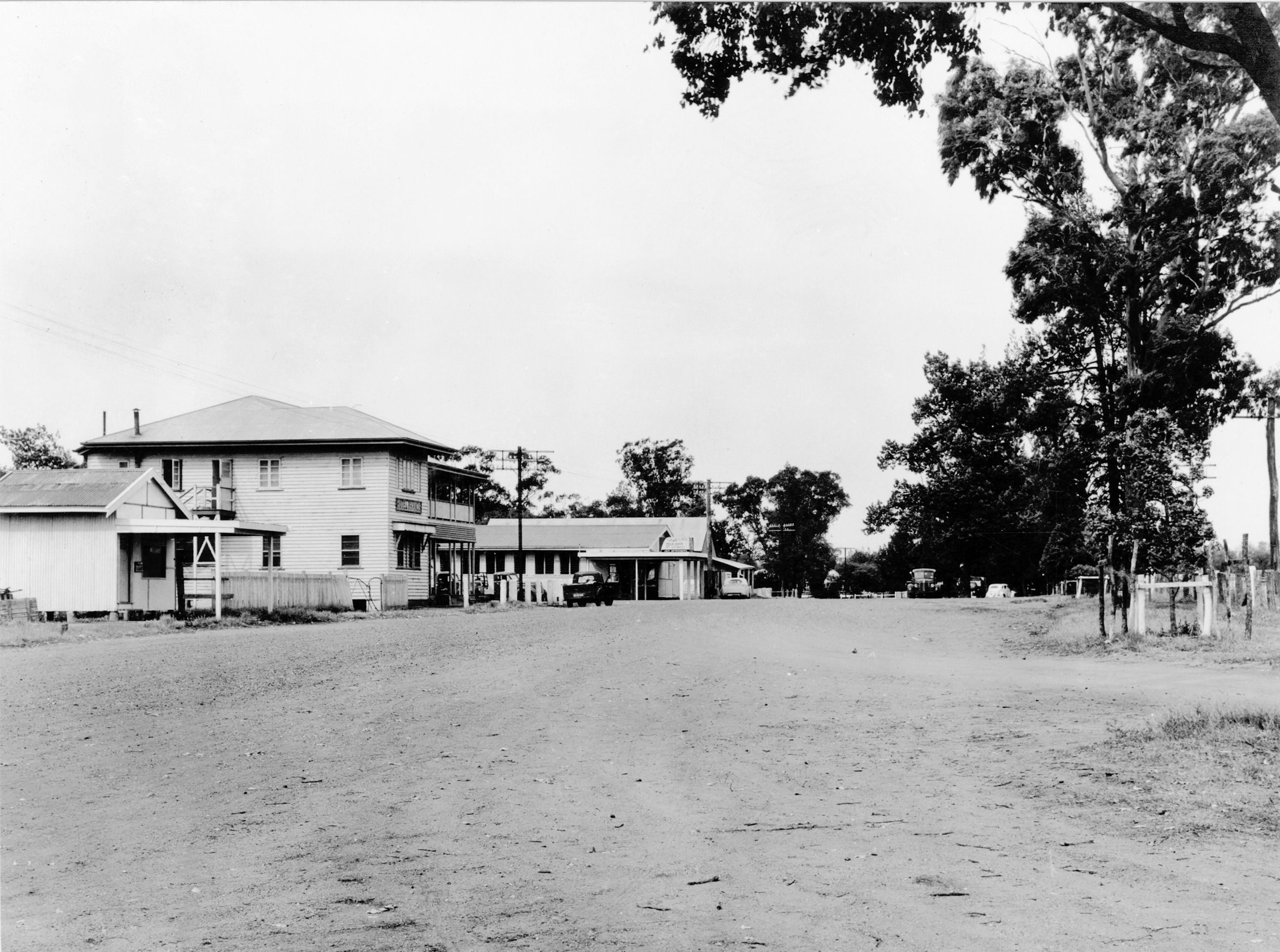
Pine St, Thallon, circa 1954, with the hotel on the left

With the coming of the railway, the town developed and shops and a hotel were established.

Thallon State School opened on 24 July 1911.

St Joseph's Catholic Church was built in 1916 from timber using a "ready-to-erect" system. It was 30 by 25 feet (9.1 by 7.6 m). It cost £268. It was officially opened by Archbishop James Duhig on Sunday 17 September 1916. It was in Garah Street (28.638697°S 148.865°E) on a 0.5 acres (0.20 ha) site donated by F. McLoughlin. In 1980, it closed due to termite damage.

Myrtlemount Provisional School, Warrie Provisional School and Hollymount Provisional School (all named after local pastoral stations) opened on 29 September 1919 as a group of part-time schools (sharing a teacher between them). All three schools closed in 1922 due to low student numbers.

== Demographics ==
In the 2011 census, the locality of Thallon and the surrounding area had a population of 382 people.

In the 2016 census, the locality of Thallon had a population of 257 people.

In the 2021 census, the locality of Thallon had a population of 231 people.

== Heritage listings ==
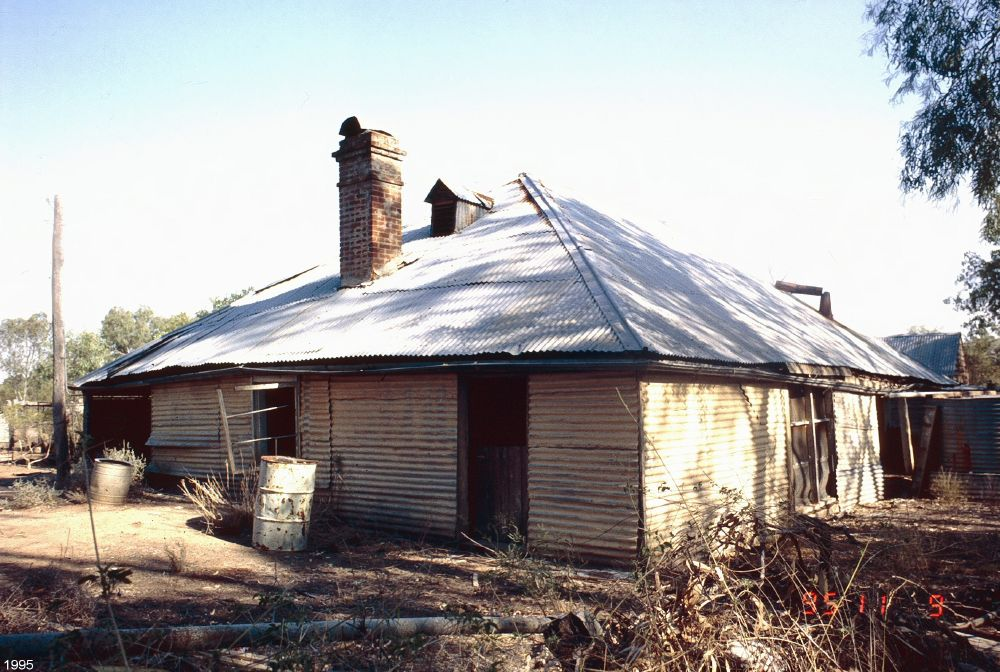
Bullamon Homestead, 1995

Thallon has the following heritage-listed sites:

- Bullamon Homestead, by the Moonie River (28.6455°S 148.8563°E)

== Education ==
Thallon State School is a government primary (Prep-6) school for boys and girls at 15 Henry Street (28.6336°S 148.8677°E). In 2017, the school had an enrolment of 36 students with 4 teachers (3 full-time equivalent) and 7 non-teaching staff (3 full-time equivalent). In 2022, the school had an enrolment of 18 students.

There is no secondary school in Thallon; the nearest is St George State High School in neighbouring St George.

== Facilities ==
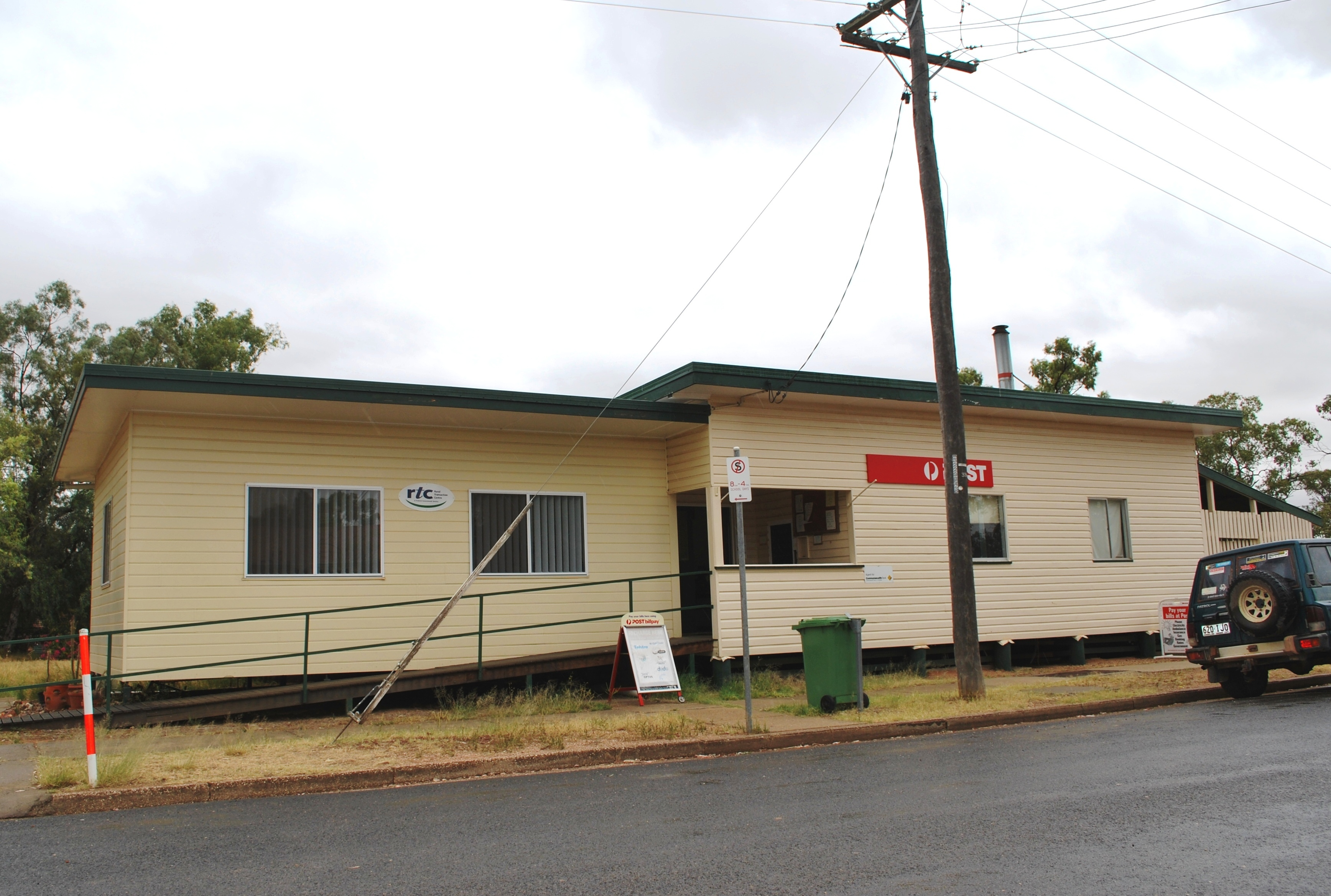
Thallon Post Office, 2008

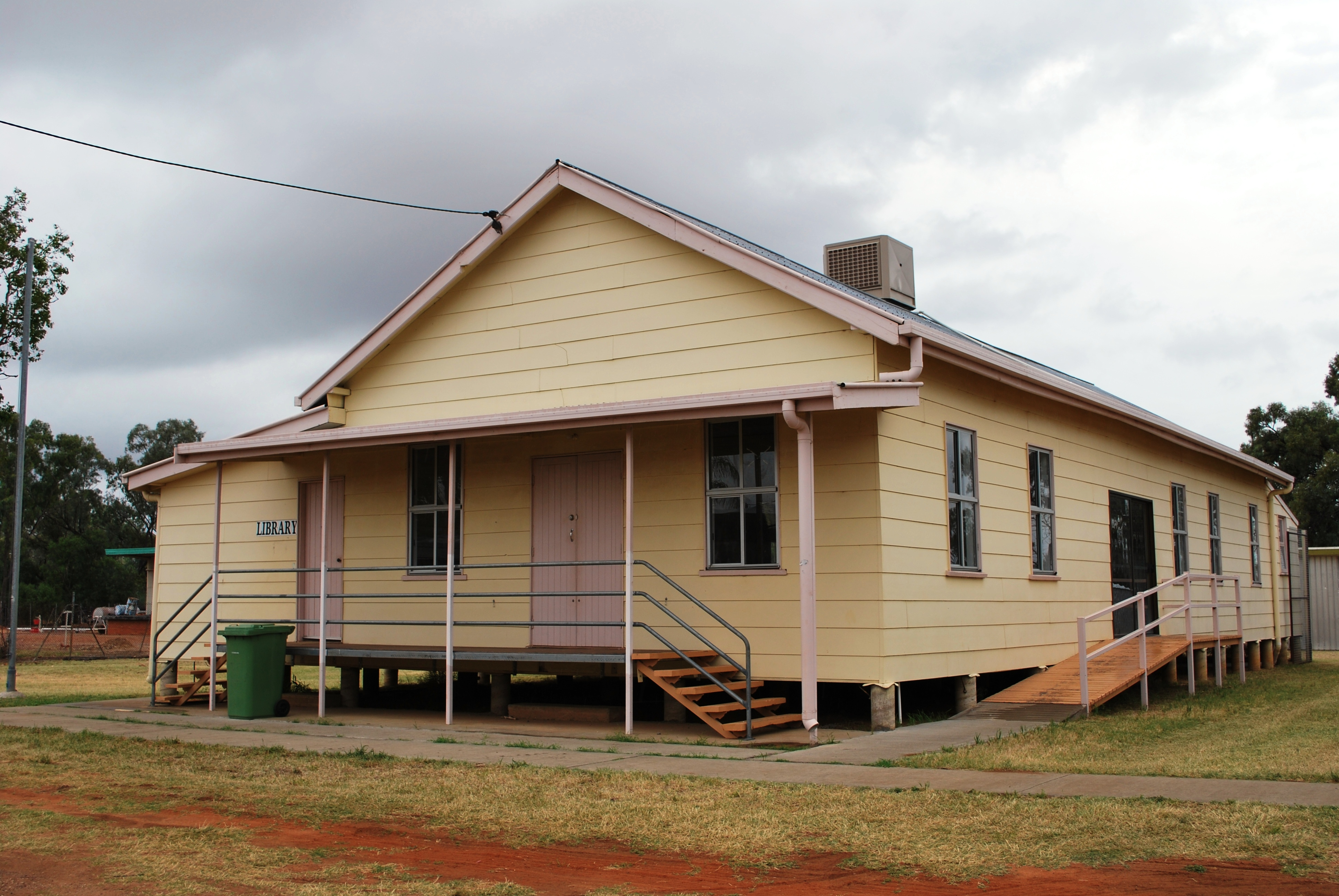
Thallon Public Hall, 2008

Thallon has a post office, hotel, community hall, showground, park and sportsground.

Balonne Shire Council operates a library in William Street.

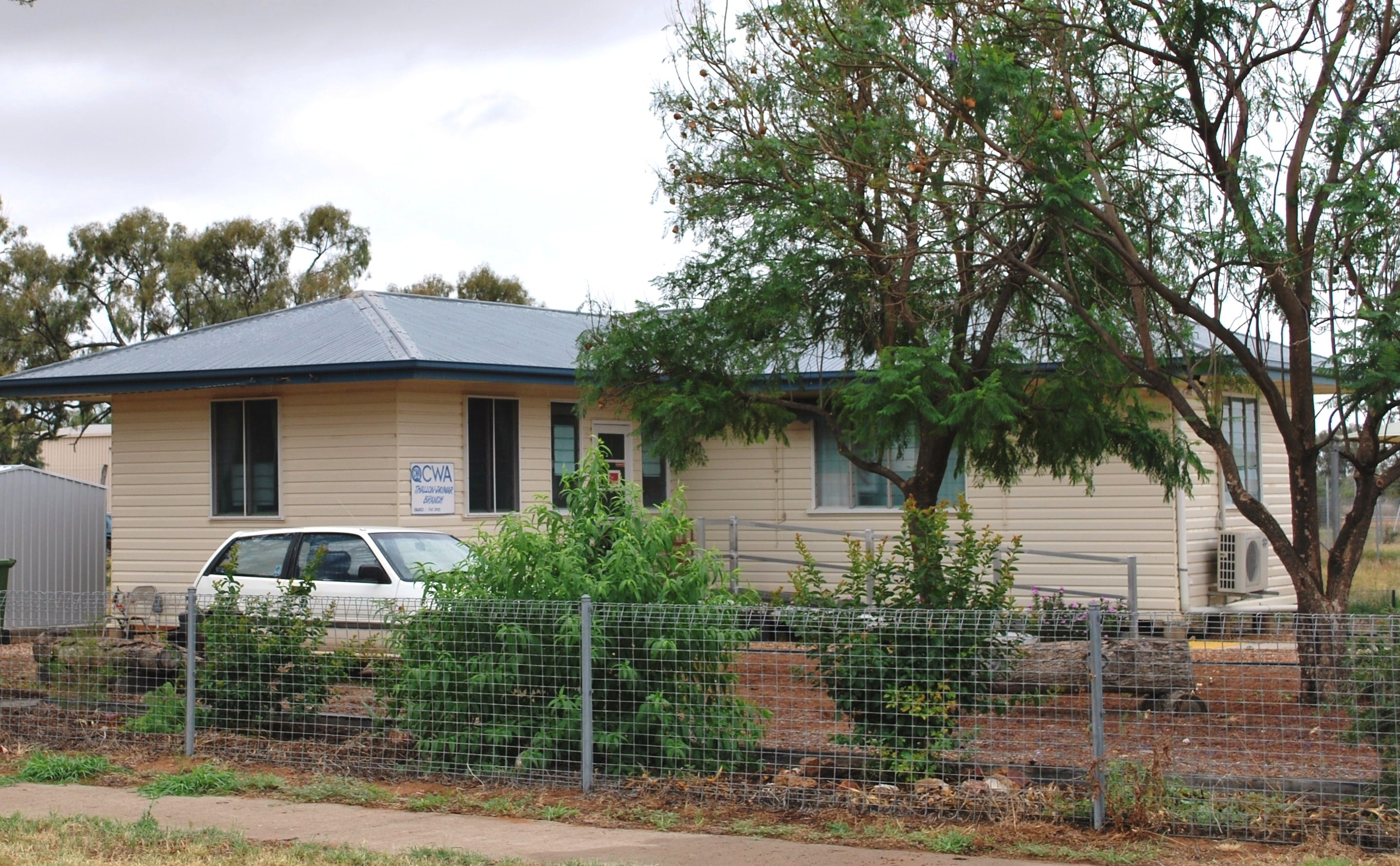
Country Women's Association rooms, 2008

The Thallon-Daymar branch of the Queensland Country Women's Association has its rooms at 47 William Street. Daymar is a neighbouring town, 12 kilometres (7.5 mi) east of Thallon.

== William the Wombat ==
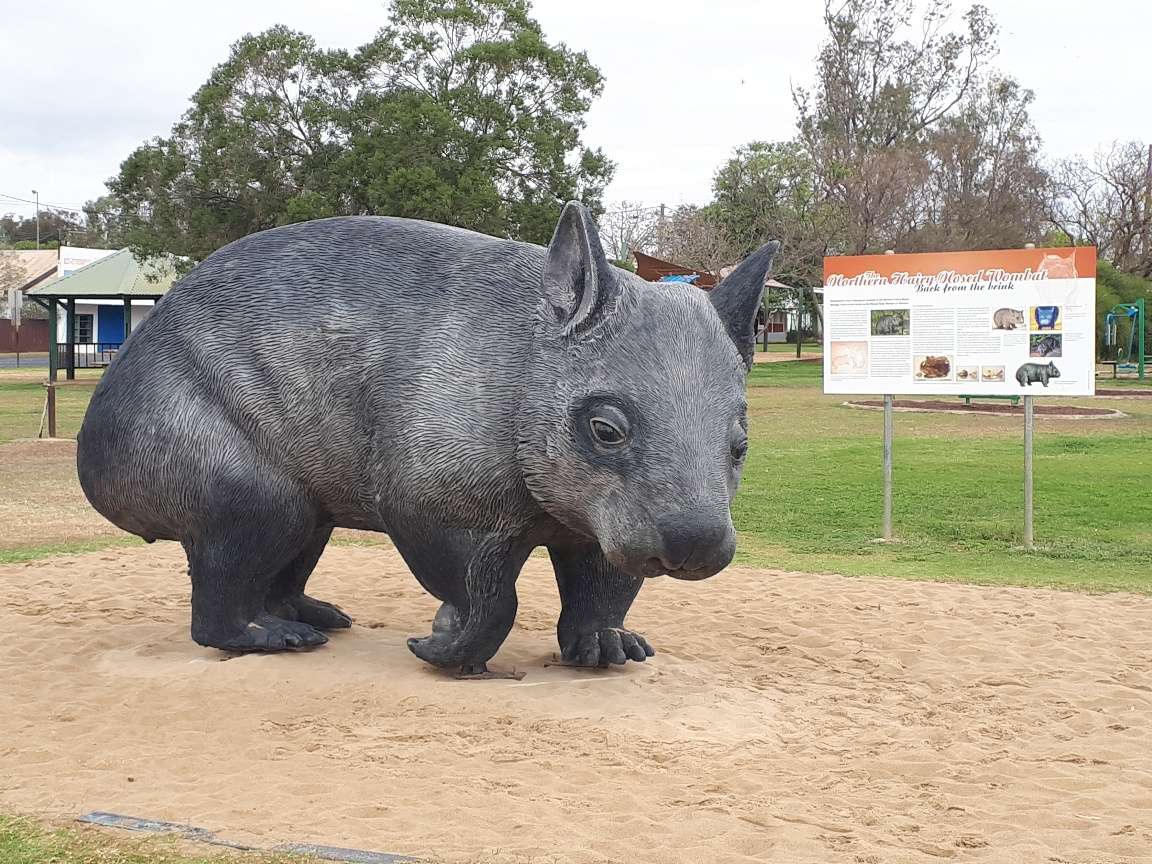
William the Wombat, one of Australia's big things, 2018

In 2015, the town of Thallon decided to build a large statue of a northern hairy-nosed wombat as one of Australia's Big Things to attract tourists and to highlight the critically endangered status of the species which had once inhabited the Thallon area but is now extinct in that area. The statue is 2 m × 3.5 m (6.6 ft × 11.5 ft) and was built by David Joffe at Natureworks in Brisbane. It arrived in Thallon in October 2017 and is on display in the park on Pine Street (28.6361°S 148.8690°E).

There is a small population of the wombats at the Richard Underwood Nature Refuge, located between St George and Surat, established in 2009.

== Gallery ==
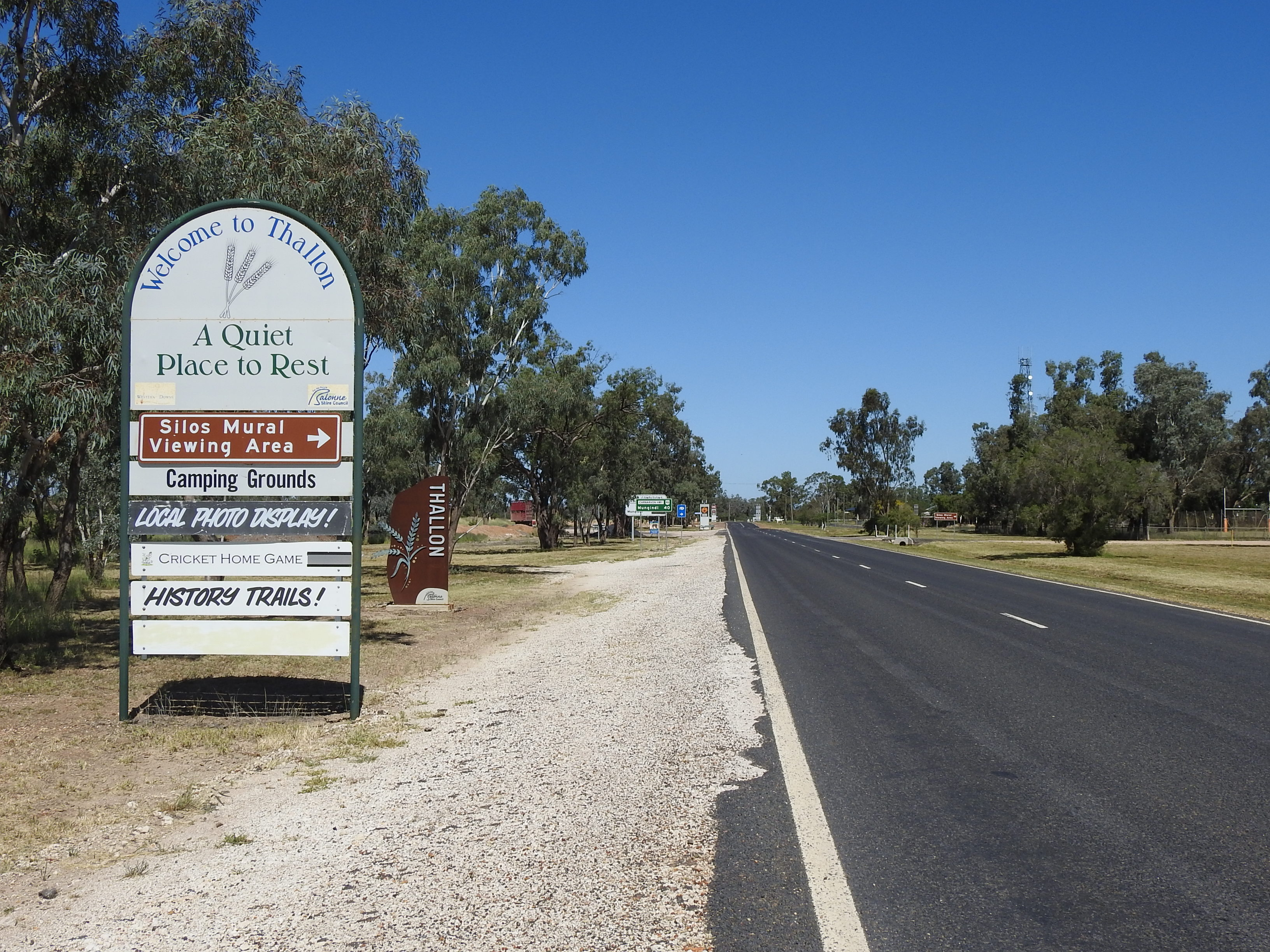
Northern entrance to the town (2021).

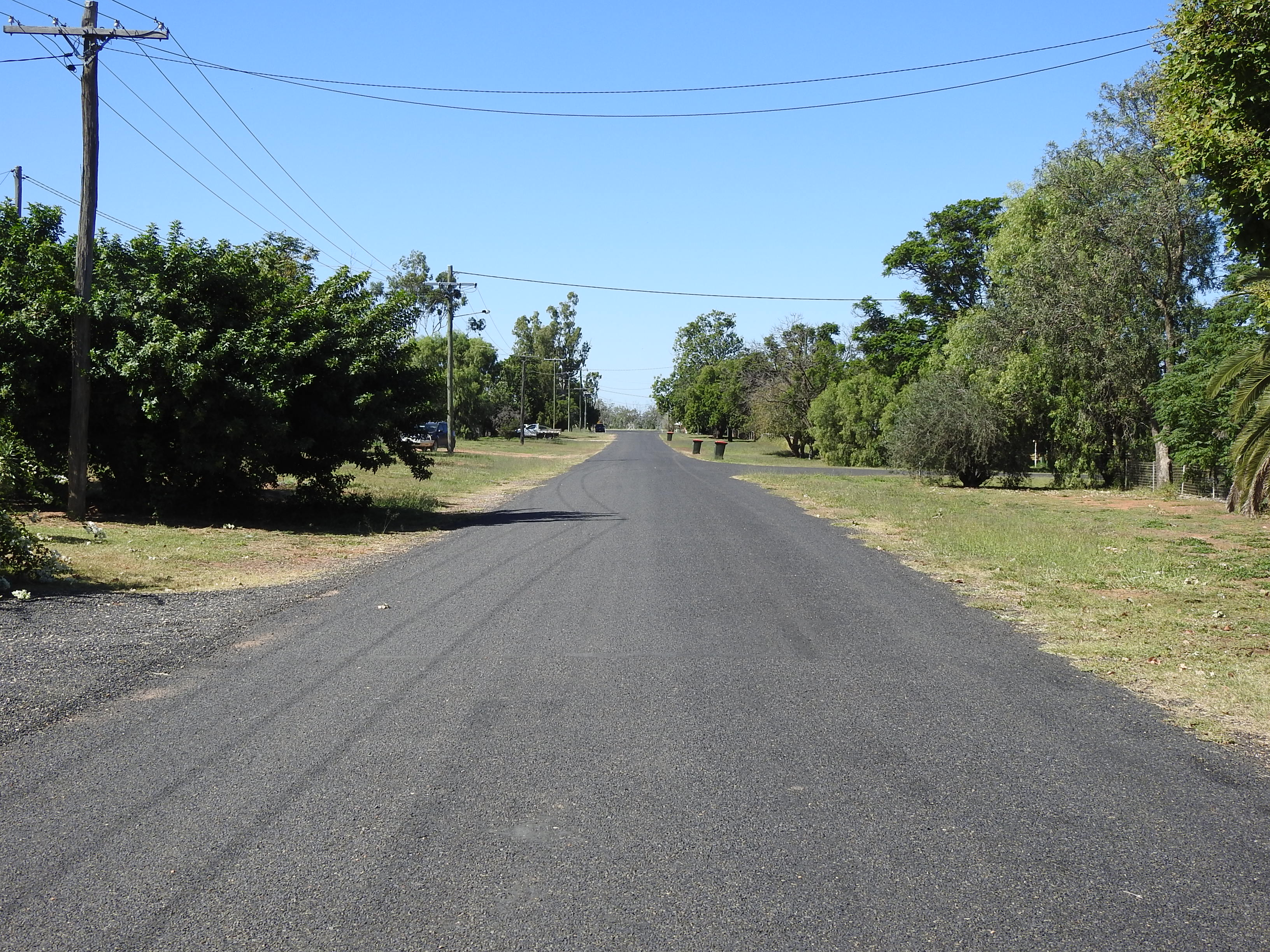
Pine Street (2021).

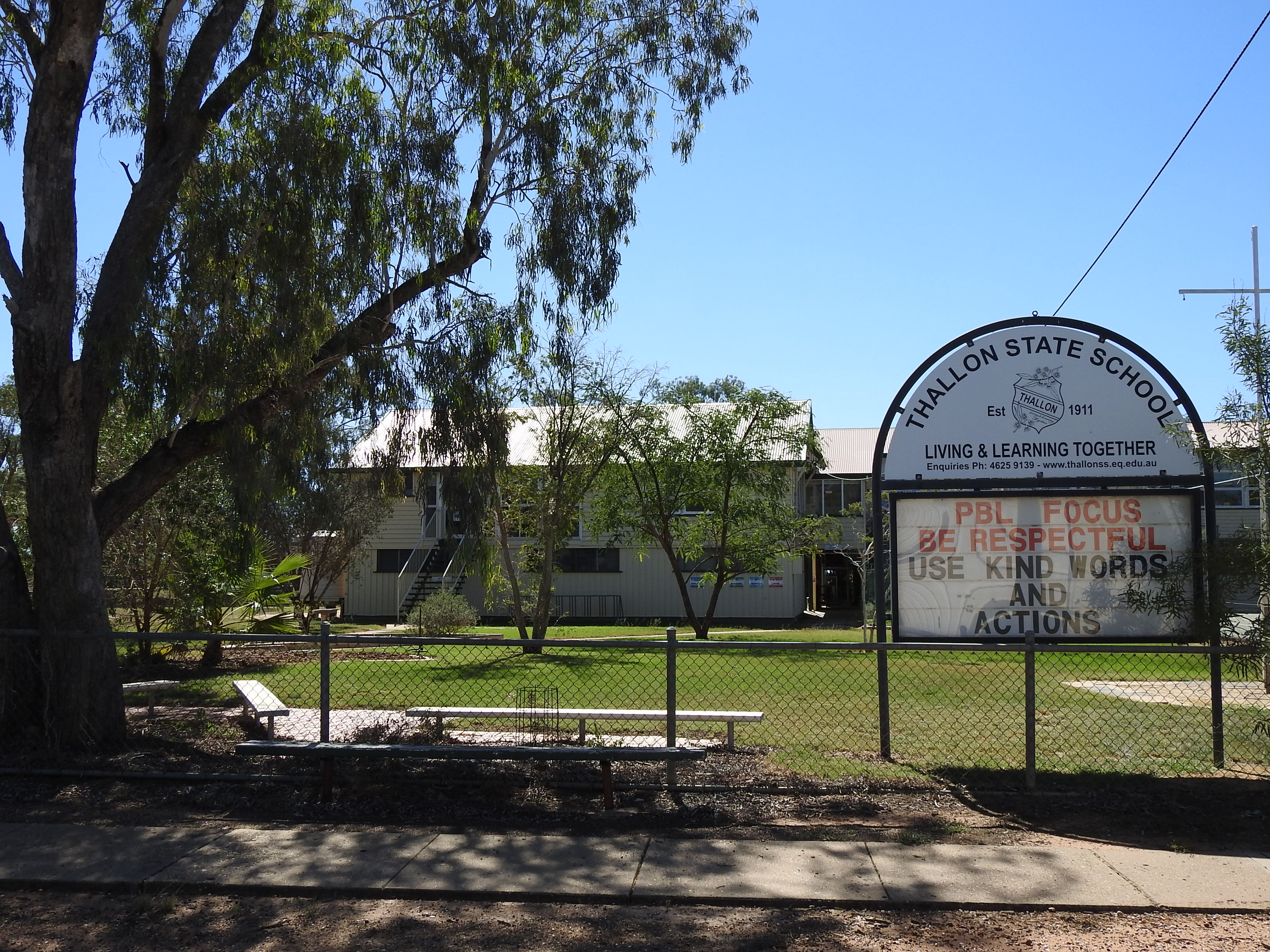
Thallon State School, Henry Street (2021).

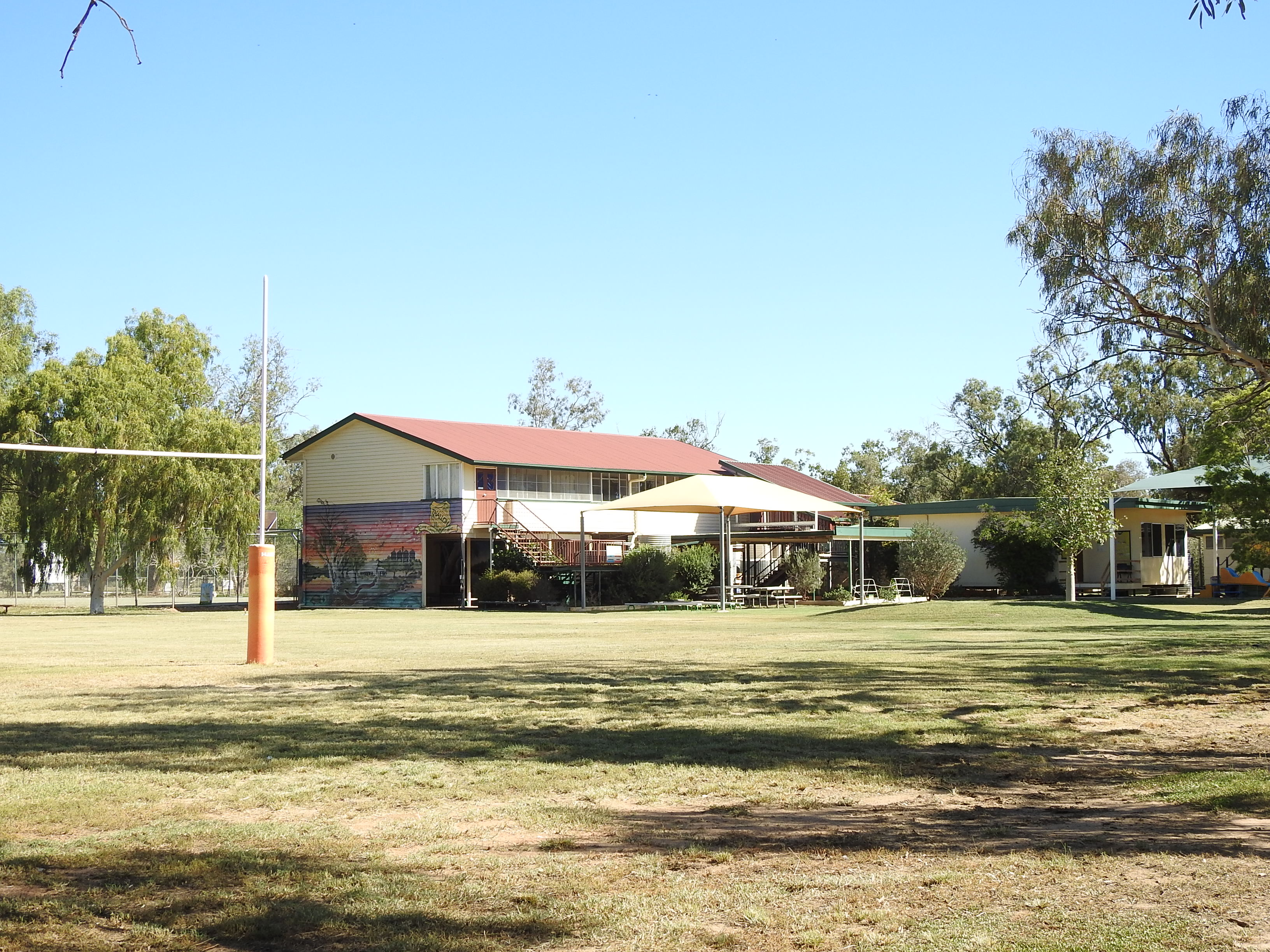
Thallon State School oval, Henry Street (2021).

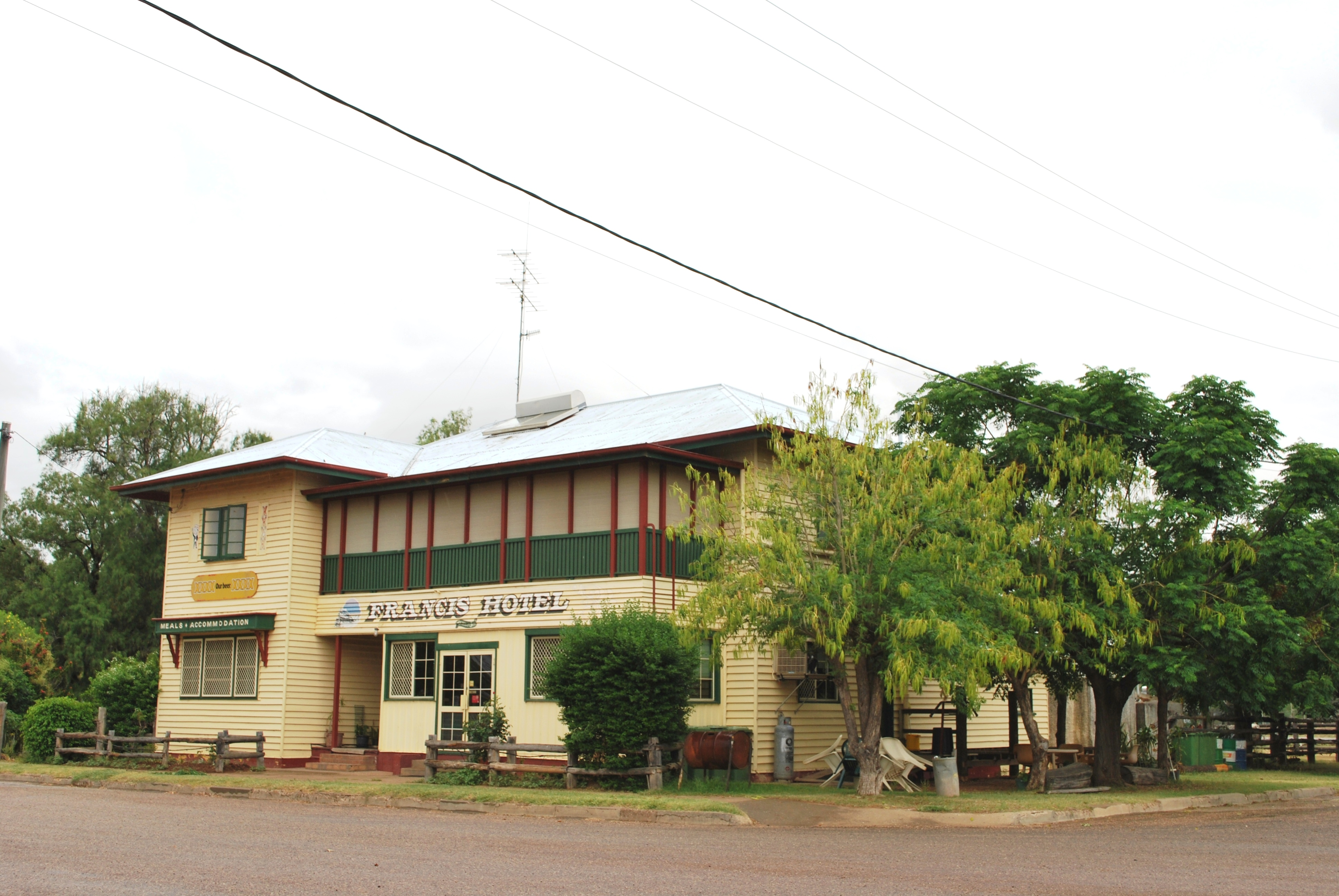
Francis Hotel, Pine Street (2008).

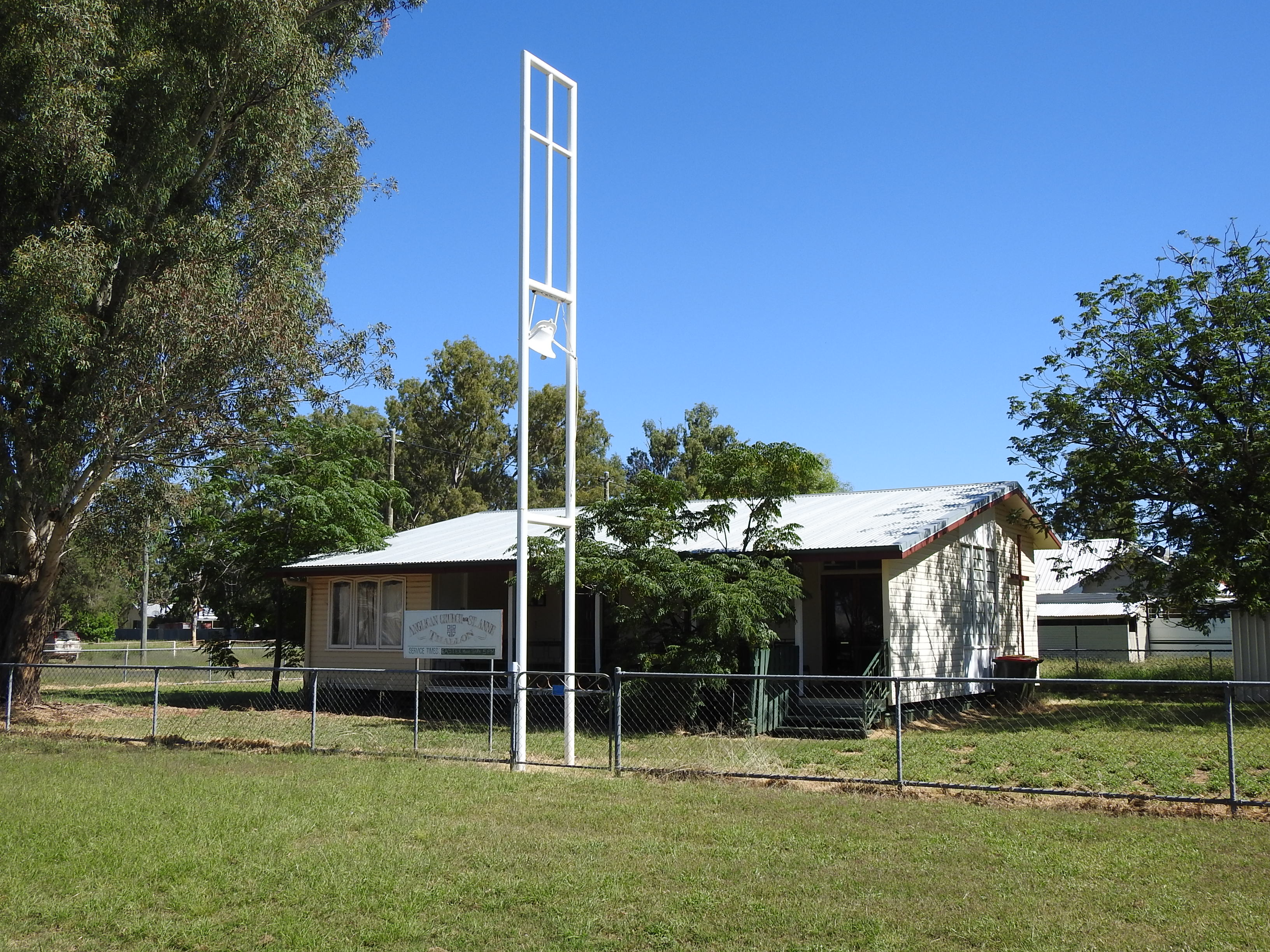
Anglican church (2021).

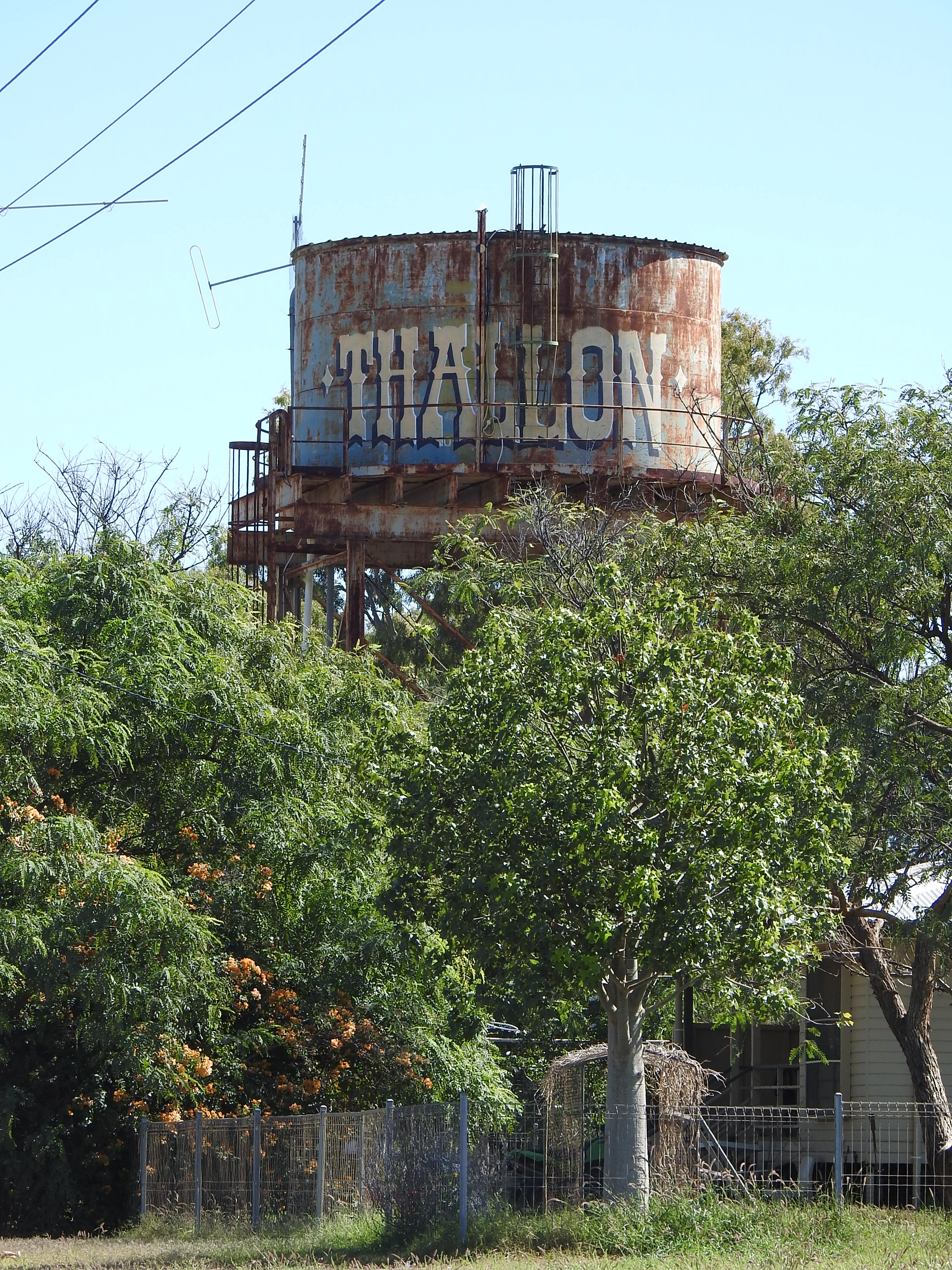
Town water tower (2021).

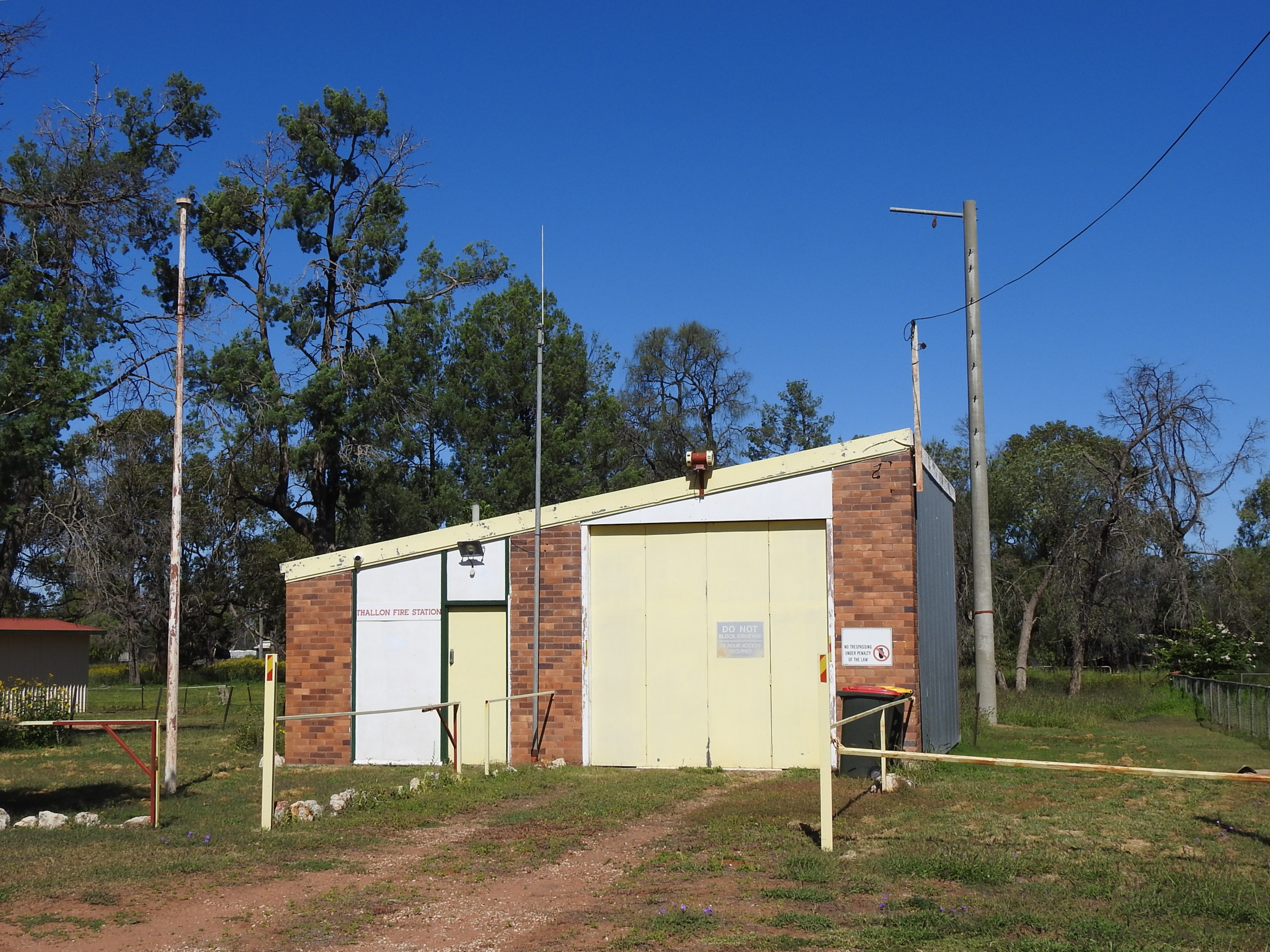
Fire station (2021).

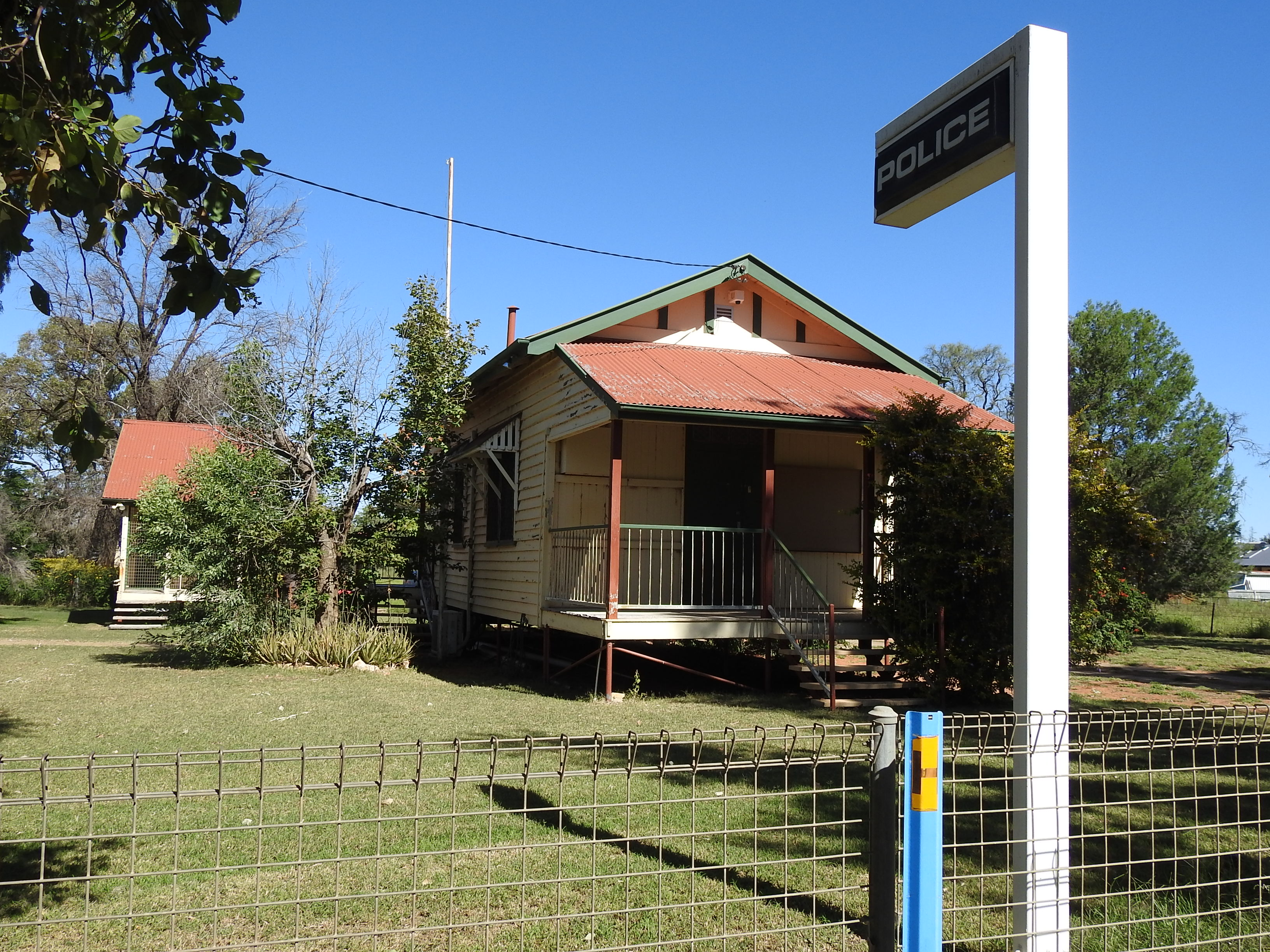
Police station (2021).

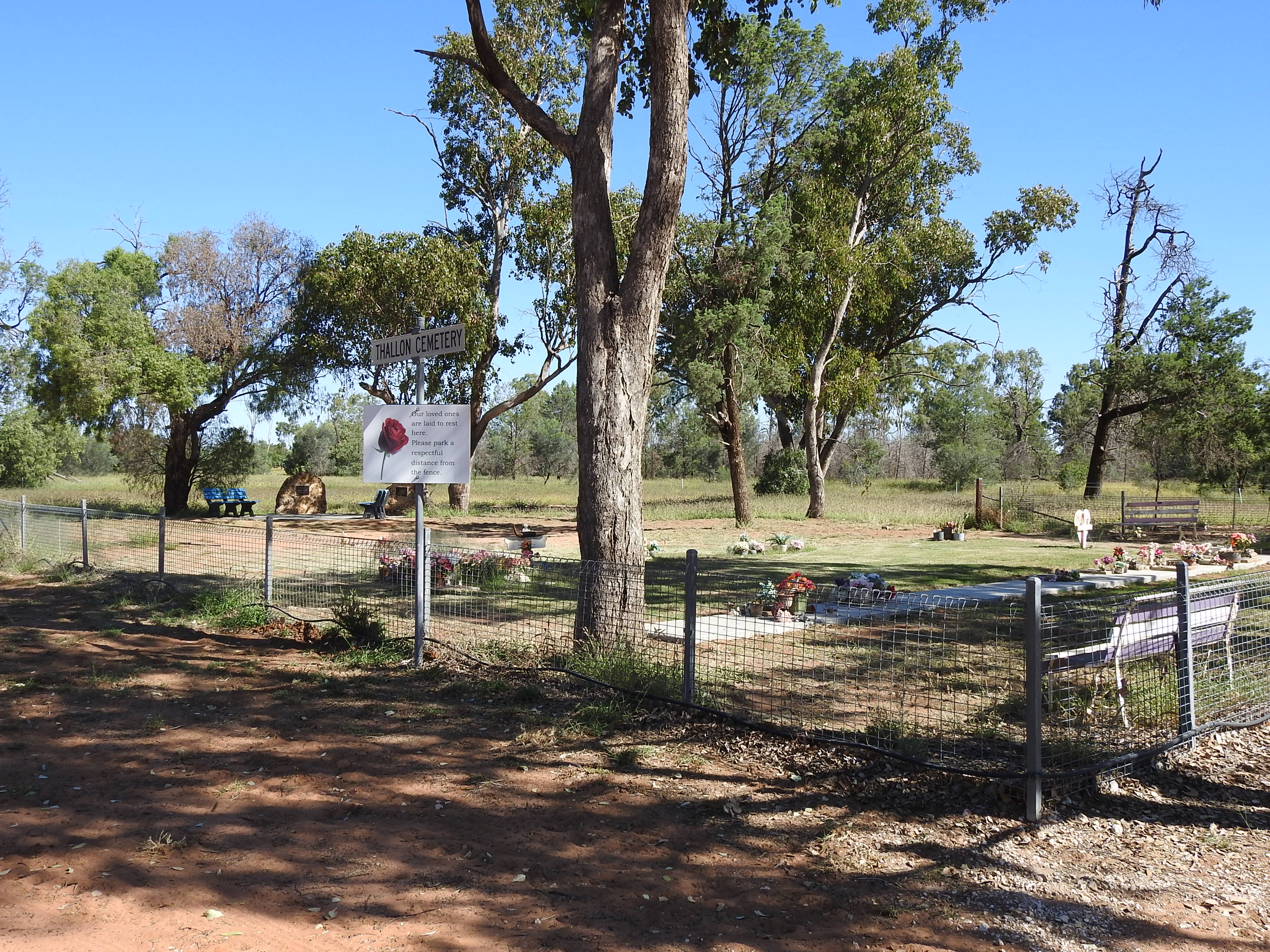
Town cemetery (2021).

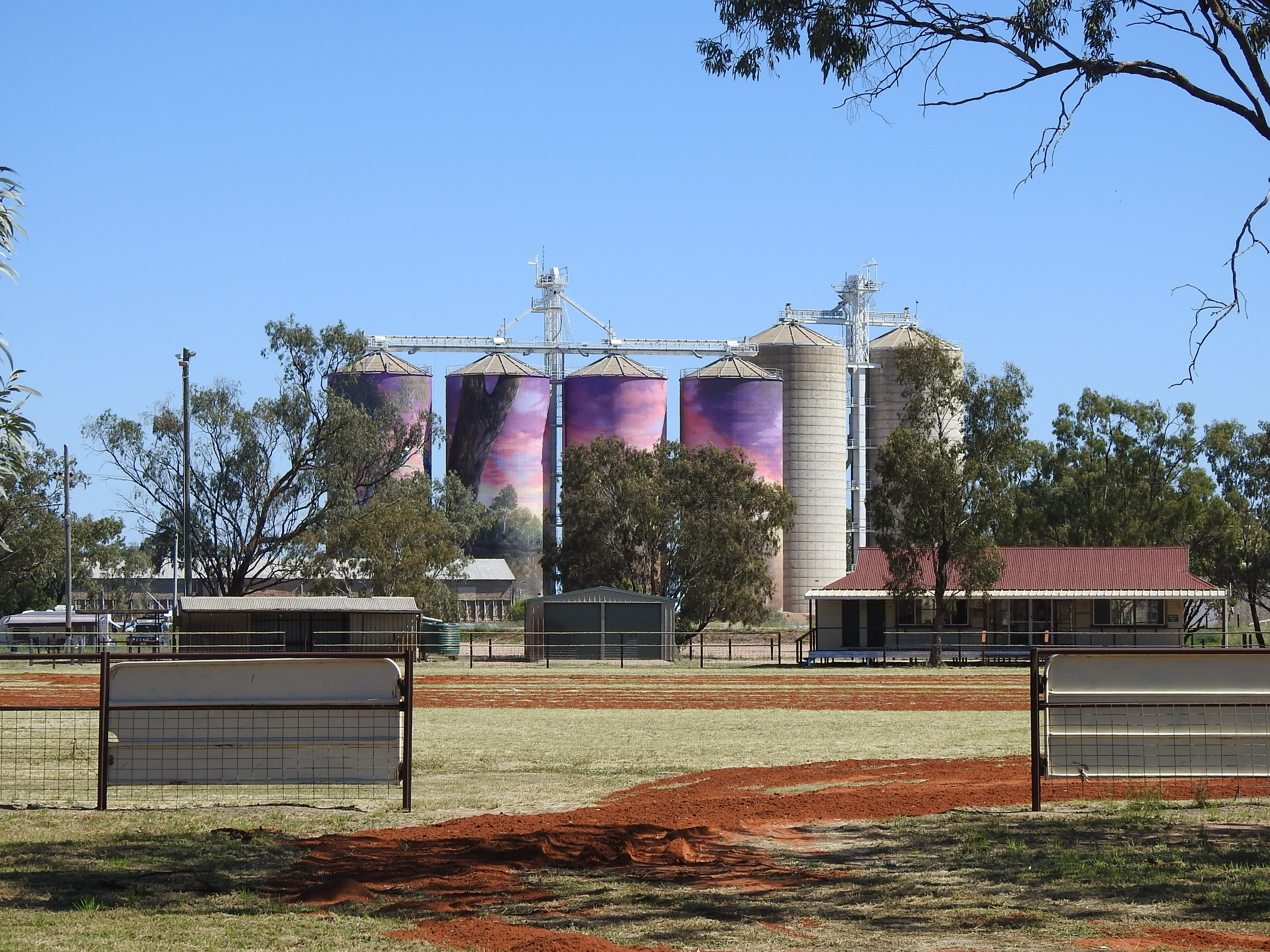
Painted murals on grain silos (2021).

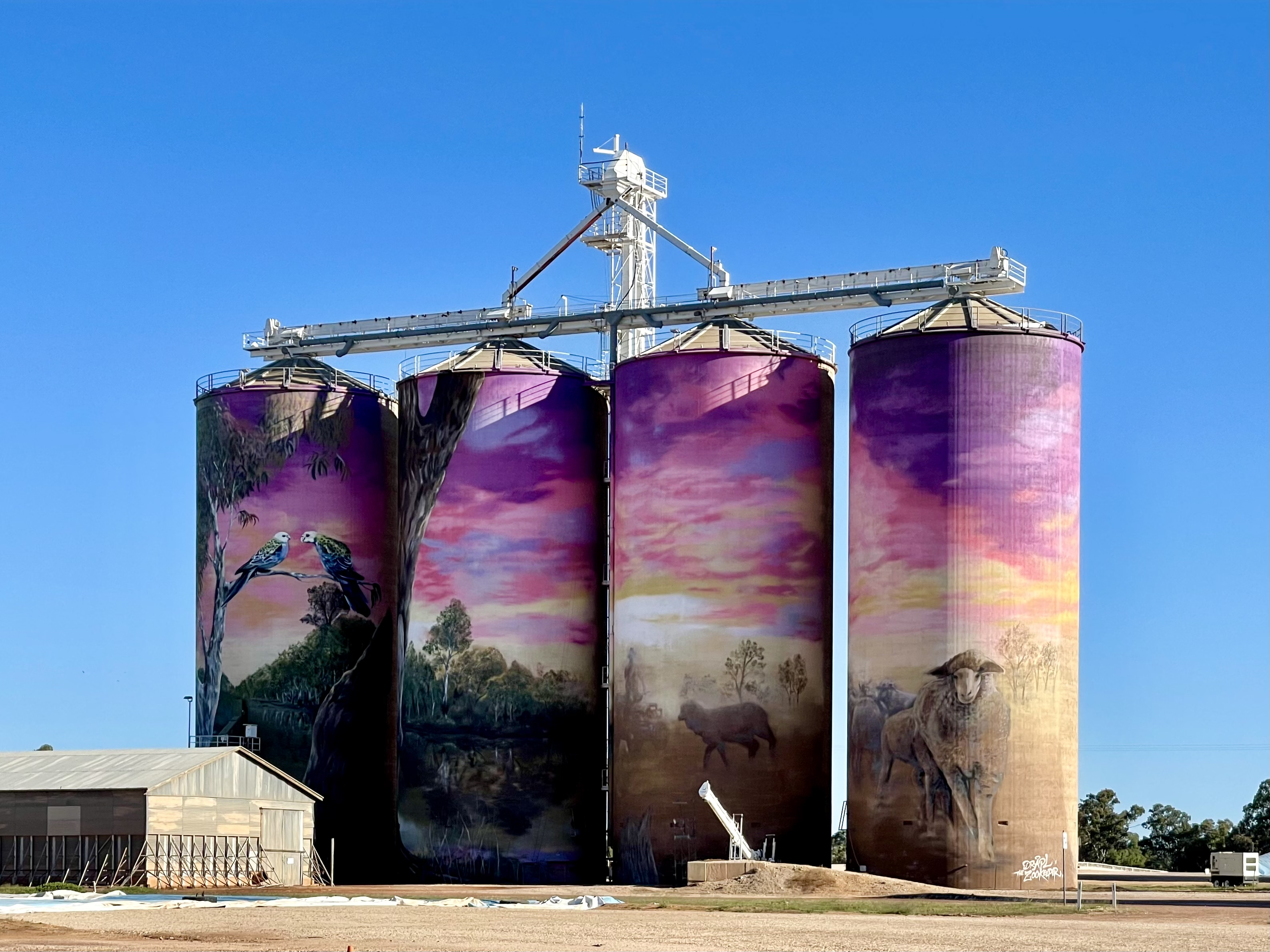
Painted murals on grain silos (2021).

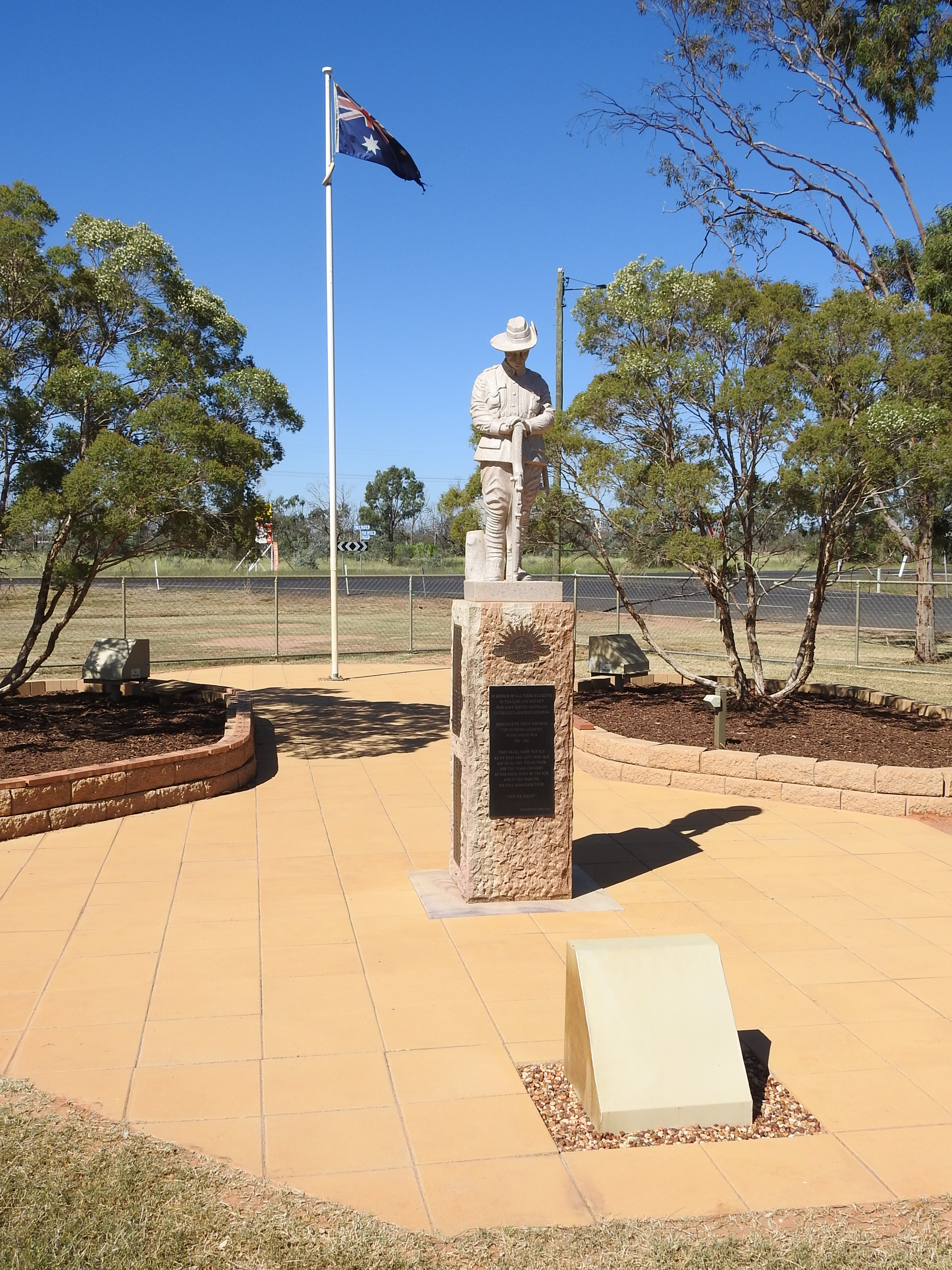
War memorial (2021).

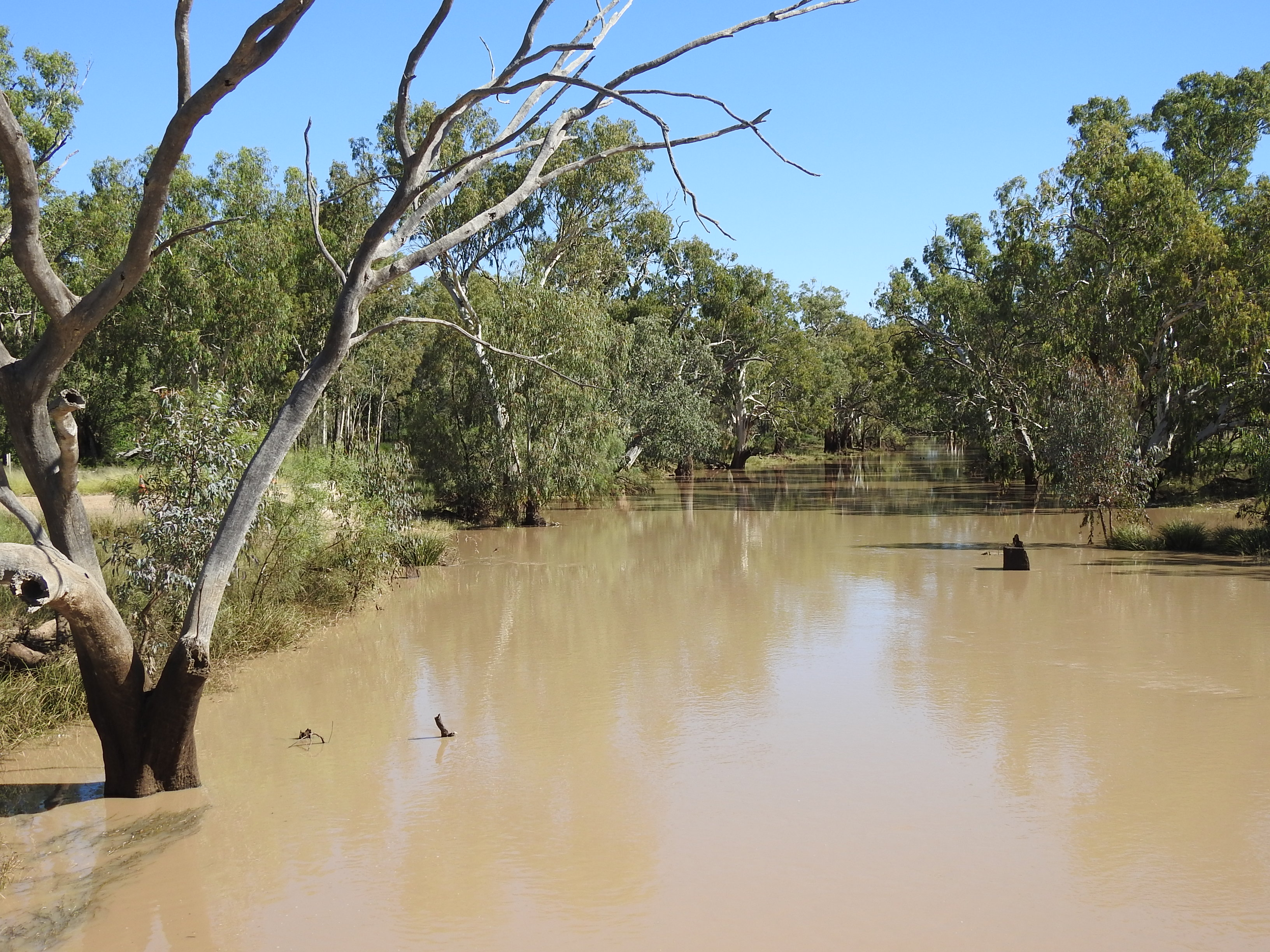
Moonie River in flood downstream (2021).

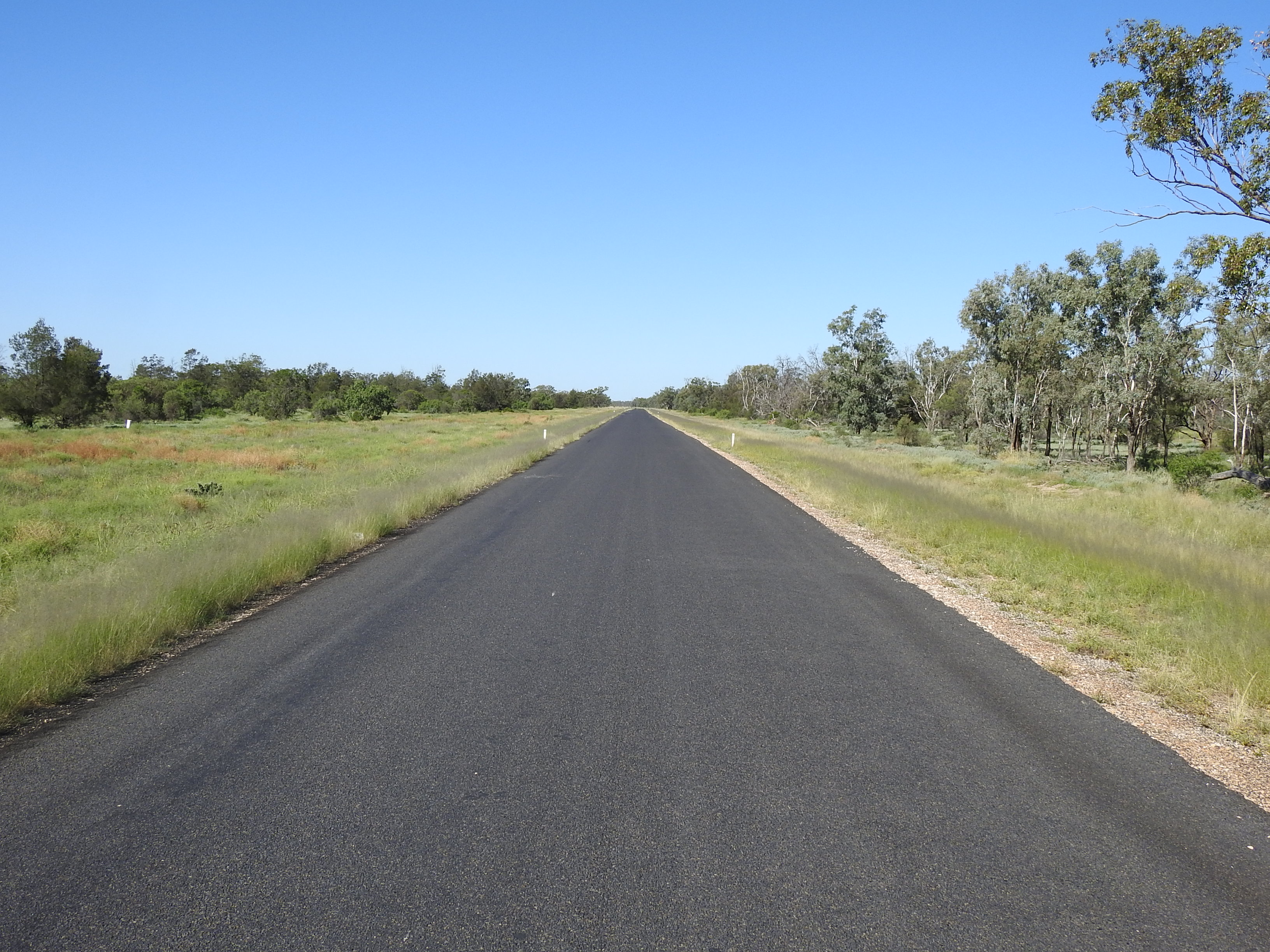
Noondoo-Thallon Road (2021).
