= Munro Tramway =

The Munro Tramway was a private tramway established in the late 1890s and early 1900s to cart timber and other freight from Perseverance and Ravensbourne to Hampton in Queensland, Australia. The tramway was originally serviced by teams of horses, until the early 1900s, when the first of two Shay locomotives began servicing the line. This was the first tramway in Queensland to use a steam locomotive to haul timber and continued to operate until 1936. It used a narrow gauge of 2 feet 6 inches (762 mm),

The tramway was constructed in three stages. The first section connected Munro's Sawmill in Palmtree to a siding at the Hampton station on the Crows Nest railway line. The second section extended the line east. The final stage brought the line up through Ravensbourne to a loading station at Bunkers Hill.

Since being decommissioned, most of the steel has been scrapped and little remains of the tramway. In some sections splice plates and dog spikes can still be found. The final section is traced by Esk–Hampton Road.

== See also ==
- Rail transport in Queensland
- List of tramways in Queensland
