= List of tramways in Queensland =

Tramways in Queensland, Australia

List of tramways in Queensland provides three separate lists, each in alphabetical order of the key identifier. They are:

- Non sugar cane tramways, ordered by Tramway Name as contained in Wikipedia articles.
- Sugar cane tramways, ordered by Sugar Mill Name, of which not all mills have a Wikipedia article.
- Miscellaneous tramways for which only limited information is available, ordered by Enterprise Name as contained in Wikipedia articles

This list article does not include the Brisbane tramway network, the Brisbane Tramway Museum, the Gold Coast light rail, or the Rockhampton steam tram network.

The information listed is derived from the references and from the wikilinked articles (including those in “See also”)

== Non sugar cane tramways ==
Except where shown otherwise these tramways had a gauge of 3 ft 6 in (1,067 mm). They were regarded as tramways because of their lighter construction, and because they did not compete with government railways. The Mapleton Tramway, a former sugar cane tramway, is included in this list because it has its own article, and is heritage listed.

Tramway lengths are shown in miles to conform to other Australian railway articles. Where the source shows the distance in kilometres some small difference may occur due to rounding.

Tramway name	Owner / operator	From locality	To locality	From year	To year	Length	Gauge	Notes
Aramac	Aramac Shire	Aramac	Barcaldine	1913	1975	41 mi (66 km)	3 ft 6 in (1,067 mm)	Now a heritage listed station and museum at Aramac.
Ballara	Hampton mine	Devoncourt (former train station)	Ballara (former mining town)	1915	1926	21.8 mi (35 km)	3 ft 6 in (1,067 mm)	Served the “Wee Macgregor” mine, in the locality of Kuridala. This line joined a 1.85 mi (3 km) tramway, with 2 ft (610 mm) gauge.
Barakula	Queensland Railway Department	Chinchilla	Barakula State Forest	1911	1970		3 ft 6 in (1,067 mm)	The tramway transported railway sleepers made from logs taken from the state forest at Barakula and milled at the Barakula sawmill (approx 26.4279°S 150.5044°E). The route of the Barakula tramway was based on an earlier plan to construct a railway line from Chinchilla to Taroom that was subsequently abandoned in favour of a railway line from Miles to Taroom.
Beaudesert Shire	Beaudesert Shire	Beaudesert	Lamington and Rathdowney	1903	1944	39.36 mi (63.34 km)	3 ft 6 in (1,067 mm)	With a branch line from Tabooba to Rathdowney.
Belmont	Belmont Shire	Norman Park	Belmont	1912	1926	4.3 mi (6.9 km)	3 ft 6 in (1,067 mm)	Passenger tramway.
Big Pineapple	The Big Pineapple	Loop around the property		1971	N/A	0.6 mi (1.0 km)	2 ft (610 mm)	Tourist tramway.
Buderim	Maroochy Shire	Palmwoods railway station	Buderim	1914	1935	7.2 mi (11.6 km)	2 ft (610 mm)	Built to carry farm produce from Buderim. Now heritage listed remnants at Buderim.
Cooloola	Brisbane Saw Mills	Broutha Scrub, Cooloola	Poverty Point, Cooloola	1874	1884	8.5 mi (13.7 km)	2 ft (610 mm) (assumed)	Built to carry timber to Tin Can Bay. Now heritage listed remnants in Great Sandy National Park.
Innisfail	Johnstone Shire	Mourilyan Harbour	Mourilyan	1883	1997	6.8 mi (11 km)	2 ft (610 mm)	Built to carry materials from Mourilyan Harbour to build the Mourilyan sugar mill. Later expanded into a sugar cane tramway network to service the Mourilyan mill.
Laheys	Laheys Sawmill	Canungra	Upper Coomera	1900	1933	16.5 mi (26.6 km)	3 ft 6 in (1,067 mm)	Now a heritage listed tunnel at Canungra.
Mapleton	Moreton Central Sugar Mill	Nambour	Mapleton	1897	2003	26.1 mi (42.0 km)	3 ft 6 in (1,067 mm)	Expanded to a network of lines converging on Nambour. Now a heritage listed tramway segment in Nambour, and Tramway Lift Bridge over Maroochy River.
Mill Point	McGhie, Luya and Co.	Near Kin Kin Creek	Mill Point sawmill, Como	1870s	1890s	4 mi (6.4 km)	3 ft 6 in (1,067 mm)	Timber haulage near Lake Cootharaba, originally using timber rails. Heritage listed remnants at Como.
Stannary Hills	Stannary Hills Mines and Tramway Company	Boonmoo	Stannary Hills	1902	1941	Unknown	2 ft (610 mm)	Built for tin mining. Now heritage listed remnants at Irvinebank, and a rail trail to Boonmoo. Refer to Chillagoe Railway & Mining Co. for a map showing Boonmoo, Stannary Hills, Irvinebank and Rocky Bluff, and the tramways between them.
Stannary Hills	Stannary Hills Mines and Tramway Company	Stannary Hills	Irvinebank	1907	1936	7.5 mi (12.1 km)(est)	2 ft (610 mm)	Built for tin mining. Now heritage listed remnants at Irvinebank, and a rail trail to Boonmoo. Refer to Chillagoe Railway & Mining Co. for a map showing Boonmoo, Stannary Hills, Irvinebank and Rocky Bluff, and the tramways between them.
Stannary Hills	Stannary Hills Mines and Tramway Company	Stannary Hills	Rocky Bluff (a former mining town in the locality of Watsonville)	1902	1926	6.8 mi (10.9 km)	2 ft (610 mm)	Built for tin mining. Now heritage listed remnants at Irvinebank, and a rail trail to Boonmoo. Refer to Chillagoe Railway & Mining Co. for a map showing Boonmoo, Stannary Hills, Irvinebank and Rocky Bluff, and the tramways between them.

== Sugar cane tramways ==
With the exception of the Oaklands and Pioneer mill tramways, with a gauge of 3 ft 6 in (1,067 mm), and the Morayfield line (3 ft (914 mm)), these tramways have a gauge of 2 ft (610 mm). None of these tramways have their own article, but some of the mills have articles in which the associated tramway network is mentioned. Most of the locality articles contain some information about the associated sugar mill/s.

Mill name'	Mill locality	Mill open year	Mill close year	Notes
Babinda	Babinda	1915	2011	Dates from ref.
Bingera	South Kolan	1885	N/A	
Bloomfield	Bloomfield	1885	1890	Tramway was 10 miles (16 km) long, built from portable track. Mill closed 1890.
Cattle Creek	Finch Hatton	1906	1990	Tramway absorbed by Marian mill.
Fairymead	Fairymead	1884	2004/5	Tramway absorbed by Bingera mill.
Farleigh	Farleigh	1883	N/A	Tramway built 1956 to 1961.
Gin Gin	Wallaville	1896	1974	Tramway absorbed by Bingera mill.
Goondi	Goondi	1883	1987	Tramway absorbed by Babinda and Mourilyan mills.
Habana	Habana	1883	1901	Heritage listed remains at Habana.
Hambleton	Edmonton	1895	1992	Tramway, built in 1897, absorbed by Mulgrave mill.
Inkerman	Home Hill	1914	N/A	
Invicta	Giru	1918	N/A	
Isis	Cordalba	1896	N/A	
Kalamia	Brandon		N/A	
Macknade	Macknade	1874	N/A	
Marian	Marian	1885 / 1895	N/A	
Millaquin	Bundaberg North	1882	N/A	
Morayfield	Morayfield	1867	1889	A 3 miles (4.8 km), 3 ft (914 mm) gauge line. Tram initially horse-drawn; later by an 8-ton locomotive. Heritage listed ruins, including tramway rails.
Moreton	Nambour	1897	2003	Mill demolished in 2006 and most lines removed. See Mapleton tramway in the above table for further details.
Mossman	Mossman	1894	2024	Mossman Mill entered voluntary administration in November 2023 and liquidation in February 2024, with it closing the sugar cane tramway.
Mourilyan	Mourilyan	1884	2006	Mill destroyed by Cyclone Larry.
Mulgrave	Gordonvale	1896	N/A	See also Cairns-Mulgrave Tramway, a 31 miles (50 km), 3 ft 6 in (1,067 mm) gauge line incorporated into Queensland Rail In 1911.
North Eton	North Eton	1888	1989	Tramway absorbed by Marian, Pleystowe and Racecourse mills.
Pioneer	Brandon		N/A	
Plane Creek	Sarina	1896	N/A	
Pleystowe	Pleystowe	1872	2009	Absorbed by Racecourse Sugar Mill 2009.
Proserpine	Proserpine	1897	N/A	
Qunaba	Qunaba	pre-1900	1985	Tramway absorbed by Millaquin and Fairymead mills.
Racecourse	Racecourse	1889	N/A	
Richmond	Richmond	1881	1895	Heritage listed remnants at Richmond.
Rocky Point	Steiglitz	1924	1951	Rocky Point Sugar Mill is still operational. The Fowler locomotive is on display at the Beenleigh Historical Village.
South Johnstone	South Johnstone	1916	N/A	
Tully	Tully	1925	N/A	
Victoria	Victoria Plantation	1883	N/A	

== Shared sugar cane tramways ==
The following mills, through common ownership arrangements, share their tramway networks:

- Cattle Creek, Farleigh, Marian, North Eton, Pleystowe and Racecourse;
- Macknade and Victoria;
- Babinda, Mourilyan and South Johnstone;
- Invicta and Kalamia (via a dual gauge track over the 3 ft 6 in (1,067 mm) Pioneer line)

== Other early tramways ==
This list shows early enterprises that had some form of tramway, of which little is known.

Enterprise name	Enterprise locality	Open year	Close year	Notes
Anglo Saxon Mine	Groganville	1889	1897	Tramway from gold mine to battery. Heritage listed remnants at Groganville.
Argyle Homestead	Geham	1897		4.8 miles (7.7 km) tramway from sawmill to railway at Hampton. Heritage listed farm remnants (not tramway) at the homestead.
Beam Creek Sawmill	Hazeldean	1920s	1920s	300 metre tramway for very steep descent from mountain top to bottom.
Bunya Mountains National Park	Bunya Mountains	1923	1928	670 metre tramway for 250 metre descent from mountain top to bottom at Wengenville, used with winches, winders and flying foxes. The logs were transferred to a horse drawn tram for movement to a log dump. A “not to scale” model can be seen at the natural history museum at the Dandabah camping area.
Central Sugar Mill	Yengarie	1866	1890	Tramway from wharf to mill. Heritage listed remnants at Yengarie. See also Yengarie Sugar Refinery Ruins.
Cressbrook Creek Sawmill	Cressbrook Creek	1922	1930s	700 metre tramway for very steep descent from mountain top to bottom. The logs were transferred to a horse drawn tram for movement to the sawmill.
Cumberland Company	Cumberland	1891	1897	800 metre tramway from gold mine to Battery. Brick chimney of Battery is only remains.
Evelyn Scrub War Memorial	Evelyn	1910	1921	6.2 miles (10 km) tramway from timber mill to railway line. Heritage listed items (not tramway) at the War Memorial.
Hampton Timber Tramway	Palmtree	1901	1936	6 miles (9.7 km) tramway from timber mill at Palmtree to railway line at Hampton. Believed to be Stage 1 of Munro Tramway (see below)
Killarney railway line	Tannymorel	1908	1964	Tramway from Mount Colliery coal mine to railway line at Tannymorel.
Lytton Quarantine Station	Lytton	1913	1980s	Tramway from wharf to Reception House. Heritage listed remnants at Lytton.
Mount Crosby Pumping Station	Mount Crosby	1913	1932	Tramway from Tivoli for construction, and then to bring coal to power the pumps. Heritage listed site (no remnants of tramway)
Munro Tramway	Hampton	1890s	1936	Tramway from sawmills at Perseverance and Ravensbourne to railway at Hampton.
Nerang Hardwood Company	Neranwood	1923	1928	Tramway from sawmill to railway at Mudgeeraba.
Pinelands Sawmill	Hillview	1904	1912	5 mi (8 km) tramway from timber source to sawmill. Visible evidence is a rock cutting up to three metres deep and ten metres long.
Scrubby Creek Sawmill	Royston	1920s	1920s	Royston is 8.7 mi (14.0 km) east of Kilcoy. (see map) Short tramway and chute from timber source to sawmill. Visible evidence is cuttings, embankments and sleepers.
St Helena Island	Moreton Bay	1885		Passenger tramway - first in Queensland. Heritage listed site (remnants of tramway ?)
St Lawrence Meatworks and Wharf	St Lawrence	1860s	1911	Tramway between meatworks, other buildings (and wharf?); Heritage listed remnants at St Lawrence.
Sundown Tin and Copper Mine	Stanthorpe	1904	1923	250 metre tramway from copper mine to furnace. Heritage listed remnants (no tramway) at Stanthorpe.
Totley Township	Ravenswood	1890		Endless chain tramway between silver mine and treatment plant. Heritage listed remnants at Ravenswood.

== See also ==
- Rail tramways In Queensland
- List of sugar mills in Queensland
- 2 ft gauge railways in Australia
- Tramway (industrial)
- Mackay Railway
