= Argyle Homestead =

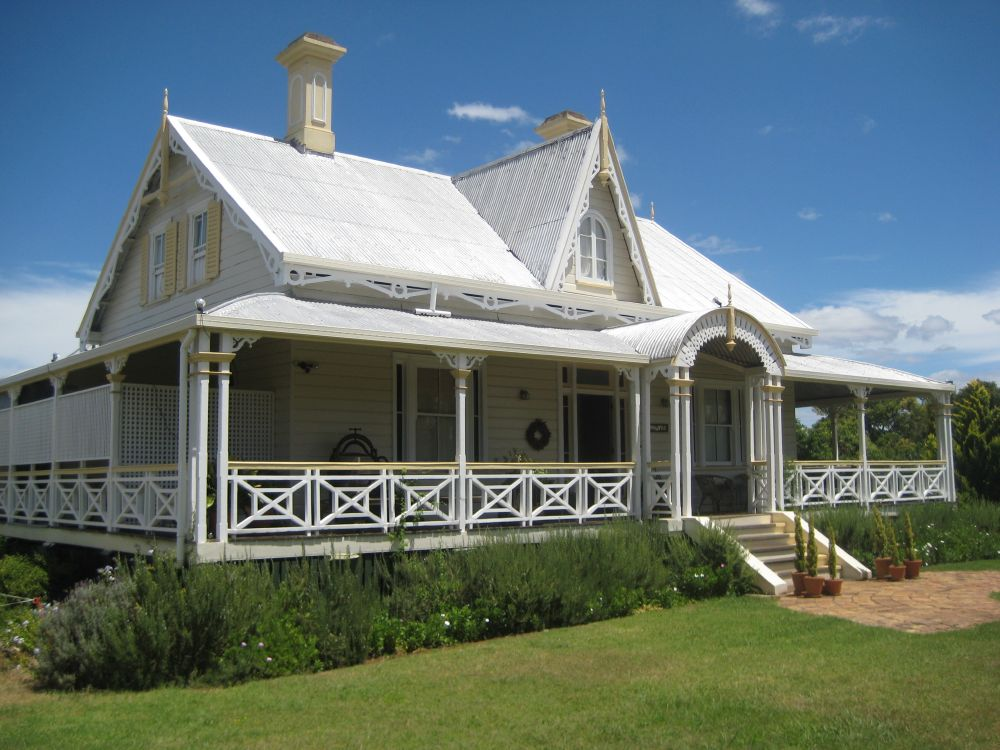
- Argyle Homestead, 2009

- Location within Queensland Location within Australia
- 27.4044°S 151.9951°E
- Location: New England Highway, Geham, Toowoomba Region, Queensland, Australia

History
- Design period: 1870s - 1890s (late 19th century)
- Built: c. 1870

Site notes
- Architectural style: Classicism

Queensland Heritage Register
- Official name: Argyle Homestead, SEQ-8F 10
- Type: state heritage (landscape, built)
- Designated: 21 October 1992
- Reference no.: 600436
- Significant period: 1870s, 1930s (historical); 1870s-1930s (fabric)
- Significant components: trees/plantings, decorative features, out building/s, residential accommodation - main house, chimney/chimney stack

Argyle Homestead is a heritage-listed farm at New England Highway, Geham, Toowoomba Region, Queensland, Australia. It was built c. 1870. It was added to the Queensland Heritage Register on 21 October 1992.

== History ==
Argyle Homestead was erected probably in the 1870s for Duncan Munro, a timber merchant and prominent Toowoomba businessman who established the Argyle Saw Mills at Geham in the Highfields area north of Toowoomba. Munro was granted several parcels of land around Geham Creek; in 1868 he acquired the land on which Argyle stands. He is first recorded as living at Argyle Farm, Highfields, in 1874. It is likely that Argyle was named after Munro's birthplace, Argylshire in Scotland.

Extensive stands of timber in the Highfields area stimulated the timber industry and provided the impetus for the establishment of saw mills from the late 1850s. The population of the area grew rapidly as a result of settlement during the late 1860s/early 1870s. As land was cleared of timber, a thriving dairy industry developed, which was assisted by the opening of the former Highfields (later Spring Bluff) Railway Station.

Munro and his brother Archibald established the Argyle Saw Mills near Geham Creek and opened a timber yard in Toowoomba during the 1870s. Munro was also responsible for the expansion of the timber industry in the Perseverance, Ravensbourne and Cooyar areas. Although Munro's partnership with his brother was dissolved in 1887, he carried on the business under the name of A&D Munro. Munro was chairman of the Highfields Divisional Board from 1888 to 1913, and of the Highfields Shire Council from 1915 to 1917.

In 1897 the Governor visited Munro's new saw mills at Ravensbourne and Perseverance Creek, staying at Argyle Homestead. At this time, Munro was also constructing a tramway which would connect the timber country with the Crows Nest branch line at Hampton and enable the area to be further opened up for timber milling. Munro travelled to the United States c. 1904, where he acquired a locomotive for use on his tramway. It is possible because of his interest in the timber industry, that he acquired some of the exotic tree species planted around the homestead while in the United States.

Munro moved to Toowoomba early in the 1900s, and remained there until his death in 1926. From 1903, Argyle was leased to a number of people until Munro sold the property to Johann J Kahler in 1920. The Kahler family had been among the early European settlers in the Geham district, and members of the Kahler family worked at Munro's mill on Geham Creek. During the late 1930s, Argyle Homestead also served as the Geham Post Office. Kahler died in 1942, and the property was transferred to David John Kahler.

David Kahler died in 1983, bequeathing an area of 4 acres (1.6 ha), including Argyle Homestead, to the National Trust of Queensland, which subsequently sold the property at public auction. Argyle Homestead was renovated in the late 1980s to provide guesthouse accommodation, and was acquired by the present owners in 1993.

== Description ==
Located at Geham on the New England Highway, Argyle Homestead is a picturesque chamferboard residence with corrugated iron roofs set amongst a variety of mature trees and timber and corrugated iron outbuildings.

The residence is a simple rectangular building with a steeply pitched gabled roof containing attic rooms, and a covered verandah on three sides. It rests on timber stumps, and has an annex to the rear with hipped and skillion roofs.

The residence has a symmetrically composed front elevation to the east, with a central steeply pitched dormer window with an arched opening, over a barrel-vaulted central entrance portico with timber stairs. Tall chimneys rise either side from the ridge of the roof. The gable ends to the east and west have paired timber windows with shutters.

The verandah, which is partially enclosed to the rear, has square timber posts with decorative capitals and valances, and double posts at the corners, supporting a convex corrugated iron awning. The timber verandah balustrade is cross-braced. The exterior has fine decorative timberwork, including curvilinear fretwork fascias to the dormers, gables and principal roof. The barrel vault has shaped battens with decorative holes. The dormers, barrel vaults and gable ends also have timber finials.

Internally the house has four intact rooms opening from a central entry corridor, with variously renovated rooms forming an L-shape to the rear, including the stairs and window of the former Geham Post Office. The front entrance to the house has a substantial timber door framed by sidelights. The four rooms at the front of the house are fully lined with horizontal timber boards, and each has a fireplace with timber mantelpiece, and glazed double doors opening onto the side verandahs. Steep narrow timber stairs lead to upper level rooms. The plaster and lath render around the chimneys bear the signatures of former occupants of the house, including members of the Munro and Kahler families.

The grounds contain various surviving mature trees, which include local and exotic species: cedars and pines marking the boundary, cypresses framing the front entrance, and holly bushes to the north encircled by a driveway, interspersed with large shade-providing pines and cedars.

The farm structures on the property include a timber slab and corrugated iron shed with pitched and skillion roofs on hand sawn timber pole framing, and a set of timber carcass gallows, both located to the north-west of the residence.

Argyle Homestead has aesthetic quality as an intact picturesque residence set in a complementary landscape of a variety of mature trees and modest outbuildings. It also retains clear evidence of its development as a homestead and farm.

== Heritage listing ==
Argyle Homestead was listed on the Queensland Heritage Register on 21 October 1992 having satisfied the following criteria.

The place is important because of its aesthetic significance.

The picturesque homestead and grounds, which include a variety of mature trees, have aesthetic quality.

The place has a special association with the life or work of a particular person, group or organisation of importance in Queensland's history.

Argyle Homestead is associated with prominent Toowoomba businessman Duncan Munro, who was active in the development of the timber industry in the Highfields area.

== See also ==
- List of tramways in Queensland
