= List of highways numbered 85 =

The following highways are numbered 85.

== International ==
- AH85 Asian Highway 85
- E85 European route E85

== Australia ==
- Copper Coast Highway, South Australia
- Goldfields Way, New South Wales
- Flinders Island, Tasmania
- Queensland State Route from Bribie Island to Nindigully, with sections as listed below:
  - Bribie Island Road – From Bribie Island to Caboolture
  - D'Aguilar Highway – From Caboolture to Harlin
  - Brisbane Valley Highway – From Harlin to Esk
  - Esk–Hampton Road – From Esk to Hampton
  - New England Highway – From Hampton to Toowoomba
  - Gore Highway – From Toowoomba to 19 km north of Goondiwindi
  - Leichhardt Highway – From 19 km north of Goondiwindi to Goondiwindi
  - Barwon Highway – From Goondiwindi to Nindigully

== Canada ==
- Highway 85 (Ontario)
- Winnipeg Route 85
- Quebec Autoroute 85

== China ==
- G85 Expressway

== Greece ==
- EO85 road

== Iceland ==
- Route 85 (Iceland)

== India ==
- National Highway 85 (India)

== Israel ==
- Highway 85 (Israel)

== Mexico ==
- Mexican Federal Highway 85
- Mexican Federal Highway 85D

== New Zealand ==
- New Zealand State Highway 85

== United States ==
- Interstate 85
- U.S. Route 85
- Alabama State Route 85
  - County Route 85 (Lee County, Alabama)
- Arizona State Route 85
- Arkansas Highway 85
- California State Route 85
- Colorado State Highway 85 (1923) (former)
  - Colorado State Highway 85 (1938–1953) (former)
- Connecticut Route 85
- Florida State Road 85
- Georgia State Route 85
  - Georgia State Route 85W (former)
  - Georgia State Route 85E (former)
- Illinois Route 85 (former)
- Iowa Highway 85
- K-85 (Kansas highway)
- Kentucky Route 85
- Louisiana Highway 85
  - Louisiana State Route 85 (former)
- Maine State Route 85
- Maryland Route 85
  - Maryland Route 85B
- Massachusetts Route 85
- M-85 (Michigan highway)
- Minnesota State Highway 85 (former)
  - County Road 85 (Dakota County, Minnesota)
- Missouri Route 85
- Montana Highway 85
- Nebraska Highway 85
  - Nebraska Highway 85N (former)
  - Nebraska Highway 85S (former)
  - Nebraska Link 85F
  - Nebraska Spur 85B
  - Nebraska Spur 85C
  - Nebraska Spur 85D
  - Nebraska Spur 85E
  - Nebraska Spur 85H
  - Nebraska Recreation Road 85G
- Nevada State Route 85 (former)
- New Hampshire Route 85
- New Jersey Route 85 (former)
  - County Route 85 (Bergen County, New Jersey)
  - County Route 85 (Ocean County, New Jersey)
- New York State Route 85
  - County Route 85 (Cattaraugus County, New York)
  - County Route 85 (Chautauqua County, New York)
  - County Route 85 (Chemung County, New York)
  - County Route 85 (Dutchess County, New York)
  - County Route 85 (Erie County, New York)
  - County Route 85 (Jefferson County, New York)
  - County Route 85 (Madison County, New York)
  - County Route 85 (Nassau County, New York)
  - County Route 85 (Niagara County, New York)
  - County Route 85 (Oneida County, New York)
  - County Route 85 (Orange County, New York)
  - County Route 85 (Rensselaer County, New York)
  - County Route 85 (Rockland County, New York)
  - County Route 85 (Suffolk County, New York)
- North Carolina Highway 85 (former)
- Ohio State Route 85
- Oklahoma State Highway 85
- Pennsylvania Route 85
- South Carolina Highway 85 (former)
- South Dakota Highway 85 (former)
- Tennessee State Route 85
- Texas State Highway 85
  - Texas State Highway Spur 85
  - Farm to Market Road 85
- Utah State Route 85
- Virginia State Route 85 (1933–1958) (former)
- West Virginia Route 85
- Wisconsin Highway 85

Territories

- U.S. Virgin Islands Highway 85

== See also ==
- List of highways numbered 85A
- A85

Preceded by 84	Lists of highways 85	Succeeded by 86
