= Ravensbourne =

Ravensbourne may refer to:

== Australia ==
- Ravensbourne, Queensland, a locality in the Toowoomba Region
  - Ravensbourne National Park

== New Zealand ==
- Ravensbourne, New Zealand, a suburb of Dunedin, New Zealand

== United Kingdom ==
- Ravensbourne, London, in the London Borough of Bromley
  - Ravensbourne railway station, serving the above area
  - Ravensbourne (electoral division), a former Greater London Council electoral division
  - Ravensbourne (UK Parliament constituency), a former constituency
- The Ravensbourne, a north London tributary of the Beam
- The Ravensbourne, a south London tributary of the Thames
- Ravensbourne University London, a public university based in Greenwich, London (formerly Ravensbourne College of Design and Communication)
