= List of highways numbered 85A =

The following highways are numbered 85A:

== United States ==
- Nebraska Spur 85A
- NY 85A
- SH-85A

== See also ==
- A85 (disambiguation)
- List of highways numbered 85
