= Lahey's Canungra Sawmill =

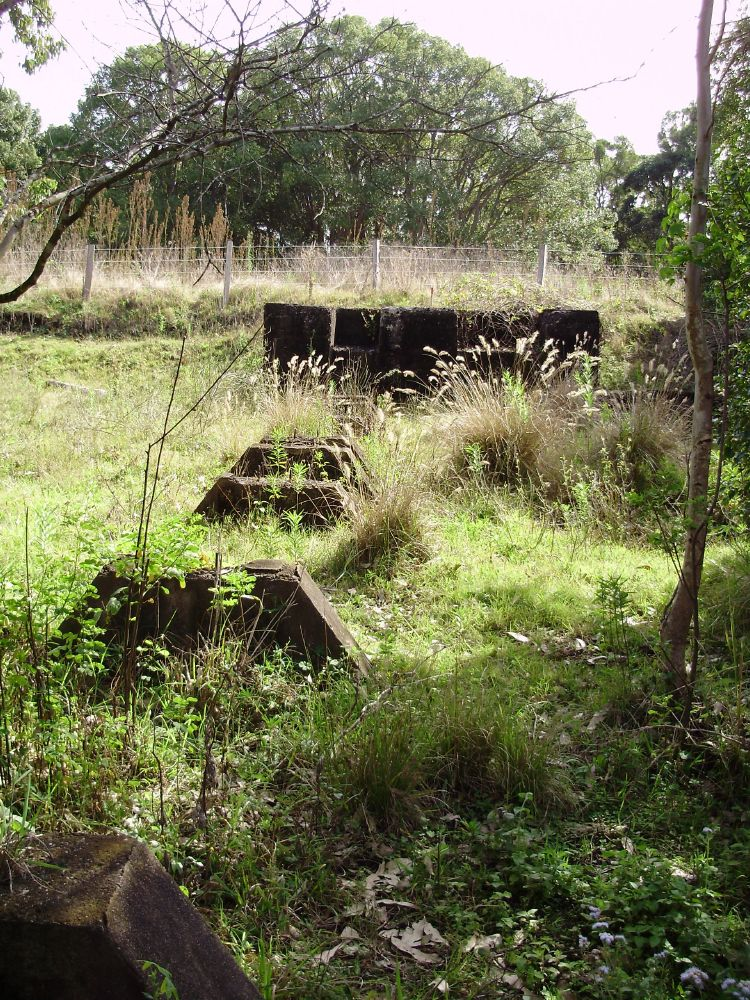
- Machinery foundations at Lahey's Canungra Sawmill, 2008

- Location within Queensland Location within Australia
- 28.0158°S 153.1633°E
- Location: 10-26 Finch Road, Canungra, Scenic Rim Region, Queensland, Australia

History
- Design period: 1870s - 1890s (late 19th century)
- Built: 1884

Queensland Heritage Register
- Official name: Lahey's Canungra Sawmill Complex
- Type: archaeological
- Designated: 6 March 2009
- Reference no.: 645602
- Significant period: 1884 - c.1935-9
- Significant components: brick scatter/deposit, metal scatter/deposit, building foundations/ruins

Lahey's Canungra Sawmill is a heritage-listed former sawmill at 10–26 Finch Road, Canungra, Scenic Rim Region, Queensland, Australia. It was built in 1884. It was added to the Queensland Heritage Register on 6 March 2009.

== History ==
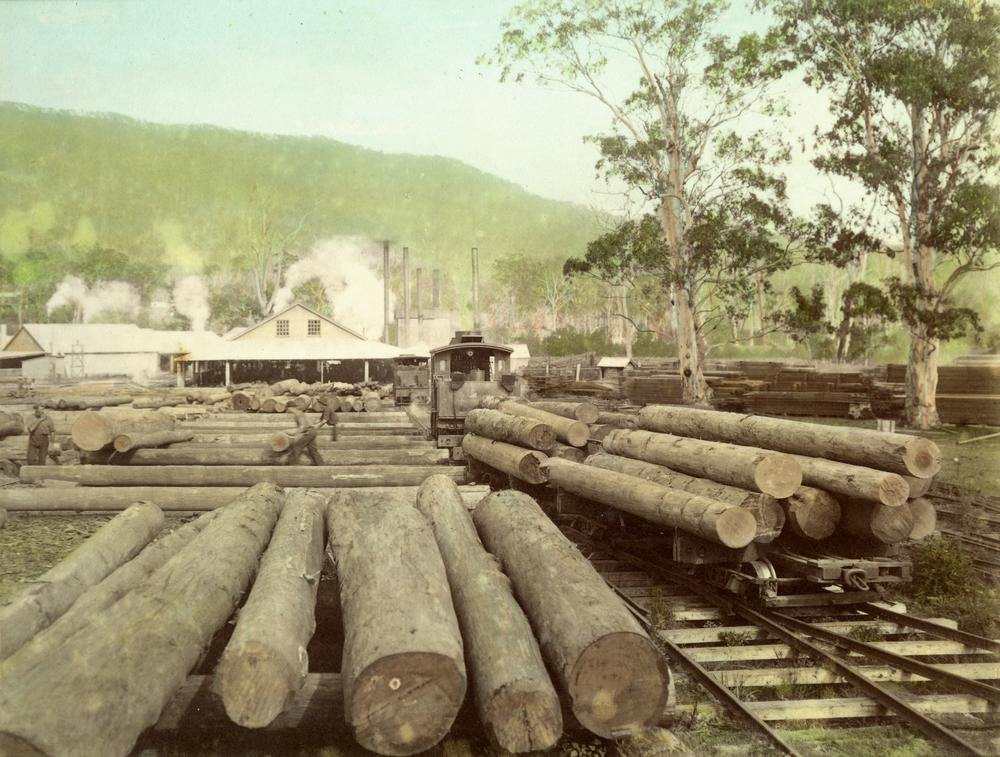

The Canungra Sawmill operated between 1884 and c.1935. The mill was wholly owned and operated by the Lahey family until 1921. Timber from throughout the Canungra region was brought to the mill from the company's timber stands via their private tramway (Lahey's Canungra Tramway Tunnel) and transported out of Canungra on the Government railway line. The mill was rebuilt after major fires in 1897 and 1906 and modernised with new milling equipment and updates to processing techniques were made regularly. The mill and all associated equipment, infrastructure and timber stands were finally sold by the Lahey's in 1921. The mill changed hands twice more (in 1923 and 1933) as the viability of the timber industry in the region waned, before closing for a final time c.1935.

European settlement of the area surrounding the Coomera River commenced in 1843 with the establishment of the Tambourine holding. Early timber harvesting commenced in the 1860s by Hugh Mahony who cut and hauled cedar logs to mills in Ipswich.

The Lahey family emigrated from their native Ireland to Australia in 1862. Francis Lahey, his wife and eleven children arrived in Sydney, but immediately travelled north to Brisbane. The family began farming in the Pimpama region in 1870. In 1875 Francis Lahey purchased a sugar mill at Tygum, near Waterford, for his sons. Francis expanded the operations at Tygum to include sawmilling, an industry that would dominate the working lives of the next generation of the Lahey family.

After being informed of quality timber in the region, David Lahey commenced construction of a sawmill at Canungra on 2 October 1884. During the same year David, John, Isaiah, Thomas and Evangeline Lahey all applied for and were granted selections of land around Canungra totalling over 3,000 acres (1,200 ha). Lahey's Canungra Sawmill was established on Portion 61, Canungra on land leased from Robert Christie and beside what is now known as Christie Street. With the construction of the mill, David Lahey also had a number of small cottages built on site for mill workers while others were established in and around what would become the township of Canungra.

Machinery for Lahey's Canungra Sawmill was brought up the Logan River by steamer to a location near Logan Village, and hauled to the sawmill site by bullock teams. Production at the mill steadily increased from 1885 onwards. Much of the timber produced was used for the construction of housing throughout southeast Queensland.

The Lahey family was hard working, innovative, and often experimental, eager for change and mindful of market forces and demands. During the 1880s, the Lahey family expanded their business, establishing an office in Brisbane in 1887, additional saw and planing mills at Beaudesert in 1888, and another mill at Widgee near Hill View in 1898. The economic downturn of the 1890s forced the Lahey's into stave-shaping and casking to provide enough income to keep the business alive. Staves are narrow strips of wood placed edge to edge to form the sides, covering, or lining of a vessel or structure.

On the night of 9 July 1897, the Canungra mill burnt down and 20,000 super feet of sawn and dressed pine in the mill yards was destroyed. The mill was re-built but at a larger scale and was more modern in layout than the original mill, with the planing machine and other machinery separated from the main milling activities.

By the turn of the twentieth century, transportation of timber to Lahey's Canungra Sawmill was becoming a problem. By this time the Lahey's had acquired timber leases amounting to over 16,000 acres (6,500 ha) in the Canungra and Pine Creek Valleys, thereby requiring the slow and expensive bullock teams to haul logs over ever-increasing distances. The Lahey's viewed mechanisation as the solution to their transportation problems and it was decided a tramway be built into the Pine Creek Valley. A narrow gauge of 3 feet 6 inches (1.07 m) was chosen for the tramway to match the gauge of the growing Queensland Government Railways, as it was hoped that the government line would eventually extend to Canungra (this finally occurred in 1914).

Lahey's Canungra Sawmill was again badly damaged by fire in the early hours of 13 January 1906. The main building which housed the sawing operations was completely destroyed. Up-to-date equipment recently imported from the United States of America was lost, including a broom handle machine, sand-papering machine and butter box printing machine. Several new additions to the mill operations, including a new drying kiln and planning machine shed were, however, saved. The fire forced the closure of the mill for three months.

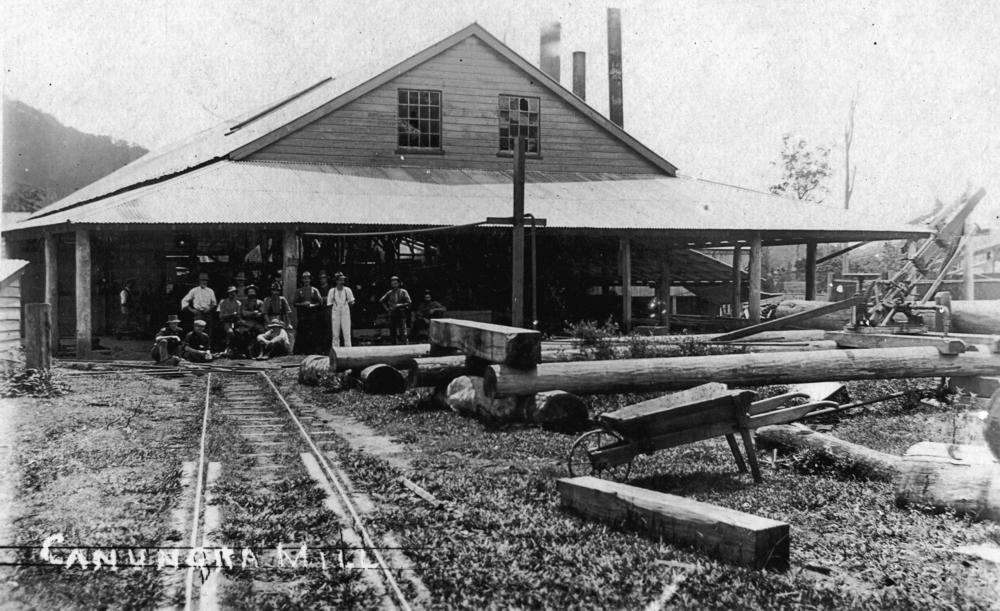
Sawmill, circa 1918

The rebuild following this fire was complemented by improvements between 1907 and 1908. Electric log-hauling machinery was installed. The tramway servicing the mill was extended over time and by 1910 the main line was 13.5 kilometres (8.4 mi) long with a branch 2 kilometres (1.2 mi) up Flying Fox Creek and a sub-branch 500 metres (1,600 ft) up Little Flying Fox Creek to service a new aerial ropeway on Beech Mountain. Eventually, the total length of track laid amounted to 26.5 kilometres (16.5 mi). Usage of the tramway continued to increase so that during 1915 alone, 15,000 long tons (15,000 t) of logs were being hauled to the mill along the tramway.

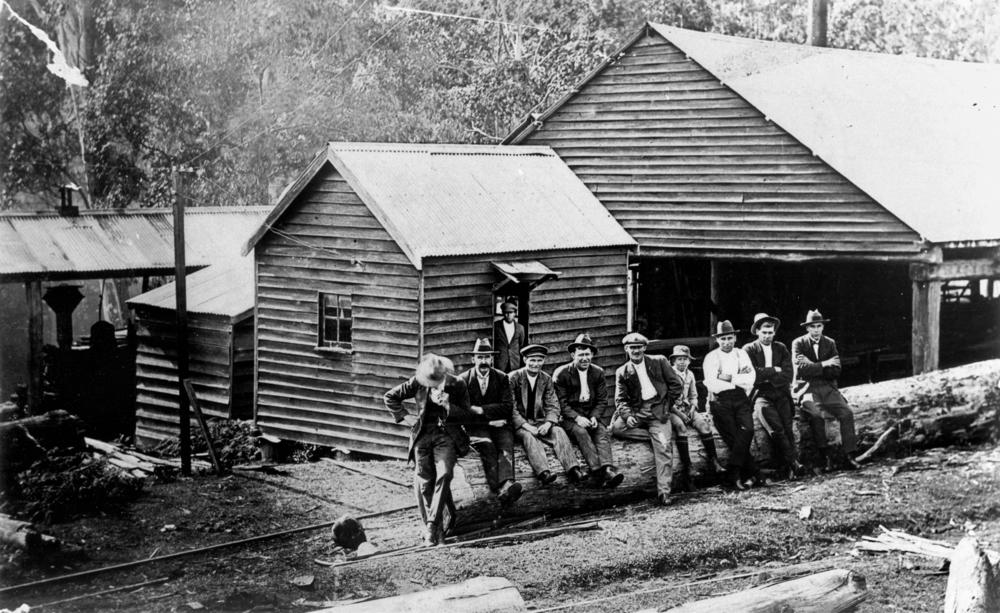
Workers at the sawmill, 1918

In 1913, Tom Lahey left Australia on an inspection of milling operations in the United States of America. The Lahey's were interested in purchasing new milling machinery and keen to stay abreast of the latest trends in sawmilling practice. A range of new equipment was purchased, and once installed, the capacity of the mill doubled and the cost of labour greatly reduced. The introduction of an eight-foot band mill and steam log turner made the Lahey's Canungra Sawmill the biggest softwood mill in Queensland. In its heyday, the mill was producing Australia's largest output of softwood timber. In the process, the township of Canungra was established because of the presence and success of the mill.

By 1920 much of the timber had been removed from the Canungra area. The War Services Homes Commission, established at the end of World War One, purchased the milling operation from the Lahey family, taking possession of the site on 1 January 1921. Timber processed at the mill was to be used in the construction of housing for returned World War One servicemen. The mill, however, closed three months later due to a change in policy by the Commission for their acquisitions of timber and was put up for sale. In 1923, Brisbane Timbers Ltd (part of which was owned by the Lahey family) purchased the mill by tender. The sale included all plant equipment, 10,412 acres (4,214 ha) of freehold land of which 4,393 acres (1,778 ha) carried pine, the timber tramway and branch lines totalling 16 miles (26 km) of track, the locomotives and all rolling stock. In 1933, the Standply Timber Company purchased the mill and added an advanced veneer and plywood plant. The timber industry in the Canungra area had largely collapsed, however, by c.1935. That same year the last of the tramway rails and equipment was sold to a milling venture in Cardwell, North Queensland and the mill was dismantled.

== Description ==
The archaeological remains of Lahey's Canungra Sawmill are located within the western half of Lot 2 on RP200758, located north of Christie Road and west of Finch Road, in the township of Canungra. The land on which the site is situated has been cleared and is an undeveloped paddock. An abandoned caravan park occupies the eastern portion of Lot 2 on RP200758. There are also a number of temporary enclosures, presumably for horses, consisting of wire and star-picket fences. The abandoned caravan park and remaining wire and star-picket fence lines are not considered to be of cultural heritage significance.

The main sawmill remains are concentrated in the centre of the western portion of the lot. Numerous concrete machinery foundations are present across this area, including the supporting pillars for the mills steam engine and concrete steam water pits. A 7 by 7 metres (23 ft × 23 ft) concrete slab located in this area may also be the base for the crane used to lift logs from the trams bringing logs to the mill. The terminal end of the old tramway line is evident in the form of the cut ends of the rails embedded in a large concrete foundation. A number of broken bricks were recorded on the surface, including those from Campbell's Brickworks, Brisbane or Redbank, as well as other elliptical frogged but unlettered types possibly used as insulation for the two boilers known to have been on site. There are a limited number of metal artefacts visible, including the remains of a metal storage bin. Potential exists for substantial and extensive subsurface archaeological deposits in the vicinity of these surface remains as it was noted that the area shows limited subsurface disturbance, except for two easements which dissect the site. A services pipe (Easement A on RP150196) is exposed in the south-west of the lot adjoining the bowls club, and runs underground diagonally across the lot to the north-east towards Canungra Creek. A second easement (Easement B on RP181573) also runs from the south-west corner of the lot to its northern boundary with Canungra Creek.

A second concentration of concrete machinery and building foundations is located in the northern section of Lot 2 on RP200758. These remains straddle a wide intermittent creek which runs from the south-west corner of Lot 2 on RP200758 and terminates on the northern boundary of the lot, and Easement B on RP181573. These foundations are located immediately adjacent to the remains of the former Lahey's railway siding and are interpreted as part of the infrastructure used to load timber onto trains heading from the mill on the government Canungra-Logan Village branch line and also possibly related to the later Standply Timber Company veneer and plywood operations. There are potentially substantial subsurface archaeological deposits located in the vicinity of these surface remains as the area shows little evidence of recent subsurface disturbance though it may have been affected by works associated with the construction of Easement B on RP181573.

== Heritage listing ==
Lahey's Canungra Sawmill was listed on the Queensland Heritage Register on 6 March 2009 having satisfied the following criteria.

Lahey's Canungra Sawmill Site is important in demonstrating part of the pattern of Queensland's history as remnant evidence of an early, substantial and enduring timber processing operation between 1884 and 1921, and again from 1933 until c.1935. Lahey's Canungra Sawmill Site is important in demonstrating the pattern of settlement and land use in south-east Queensland. During its peak period of operation after 1913, the mill was the largest softwood mill in Queensland and the largest processor of softwood timber in Australia.

Archaeological investigations of the Lahey's Canungra Sawmill have potential to reveal important aspects of Queensland's history, including early and long enduring timber processing practices, influences on the development of Queensland by the prominent Lahey family in its history, and the daily lives and conditions faced by workers in late 19th and early 20th century timber industry.

The Lahey's Canungra Sawmill provides an opportunity to examine, through its archaeological remains, an important early and long enduring timber processing operation. Although timber processing operations were widespread across Queensland by the late 19th century, archaeological investigations into the mill layout and composition have potential to yield additional information on the changing and often innovative workplace practices that occurred at the Canungra Sawmill. The archaeological remains at the Canungra Sawmill provide important comparative information on sawmilling practices, mill layouts and configurations for other sawmill sites found across Queensland.

Archaeological investigations at Lahey's Canungra Sawmill provide a rare opportunity to examine issues of continuity and change to milling operations in late 19th and early 20th century Queensland. The sawmill has historical associations with the influential Lahey family, who ran the milling operations at Canungra until 1921. Analysis of subsurface archaeological deposits may provide new information on previously unknown or little documented timber manufacturing processes, particularly as the Lahey family were well known for embracing change and for innovative workplace practices.

Additional archaeological artefacts are anticipated to occur across the site, especially within the area of the main sawmill site and the concentration of building and machinery foundations adjacent to the former Lahey's siding.

Analysis of archaeological features at the Canungra Sawmill site will develop our understanding of the Lahey timber operations throughout the Canungra area, and provide comparative and supporting information for other related timber heritage places across the state.

Archaeological investigations of subsurface archaeological materials will help in our understanding of working conditions and daily life within the mill and possibly the life of the mill's first employees through potential relocation of artefacts and features associated with the first workers cottages for the mill.

The mill complex has the potential to help us answer a range of archaeological research questions including, but not limited to, early timber-processing practices in Queensland, life at an early mill operation in Queensland, the material culture of the Lahey family and their impact on timber getting practices, processes and operations in Queensland.

== See also ==
- Lahey's Canungra Tramway Tunnel
- List of tramways in Queensland
