= Redbank Creek, Queensland =

Redbank Creek
- Suburb
- Interactive map of Redbank Creek
- Coordinates: 27.2819°S 152.3011°E
- Country: Australia
- State: Queensland
- LGA: Somerset Region
- Location: 9.2 km (5.7 mi) WSW of Esk; 27.5 km (17.1 mi) S of Toogoolawah; 57.4 km (35.7 mi) NE of Highfields; 73.1 km (45.4 mi) NNW of Ipswich; 111 km (69 mi) NW of Brisbane

Government
  - State electorate: Nanango
  - Federal division: Blair

Area
  - Total: 125.9 km^{2} (48.6 sq mi)

Population
  - Total: 124 (2021 census)
  - Density: 0.985/km^{2} (2.551/sq mi)
- Time zone: UTC+10:00 (AEST)
- Postcode: 4312
Suburbs around Redbank Creek
Biarra	Biarra	Esk
Ravensbourne	Redbank Creek	Mount Hallen
Ravensbourne	Buaraba	Buaraba

Redbank Creek is a rural locality in the Somerset Region, Queensland, Australia. In the 2021 census, Redbank Creek had a population of 124 people.

== Geography ==
The terrain is fairly rugged. Part of Redbank Creek belongs to the Lockyer Creek catchment the majority lies within the Brisbane River catchment with Kipper Creek and Redbank Creek being the main waterways. The locality is crossed from east to west by the Esk–Hampton Road.

Elevated parts remain vegetated with lower areas, particularly near Esk, being cleared for agriculture. In the southeast of Redbank Creek is Esk State Forest. Adjacent to the state forest is Esk National Park, covering 377 hectares. The national park was established in 2006 to preserve biodiversity and conservation values in the area. The state forest is used to harvest pine species. In the northwestern parts of the locality is Deongwar State Forest.

== Demographics ==
In the 2011 census, Redbank Creek and surrounds had a population of 307.

In the 2016 census, Redbank Creek had a population of 145 people.

In the 2021 census, Redbank Creek had a population of 124 people.

== Education ==
There are no schools in Redbank Creek. The nearest government primary school is Esk State School in neighbouring Esk to the north-east. The nearest government secondary schools are Crow's Nest State School (to Year 10) in Crows Nest to the west, Toogoolwah State High School (to Year 12) in Toogoolawah to the north-east, and Highfields State Secondary College (to Year 12) in Highfields to the south-west.
