= Richmond Mill Ruins =

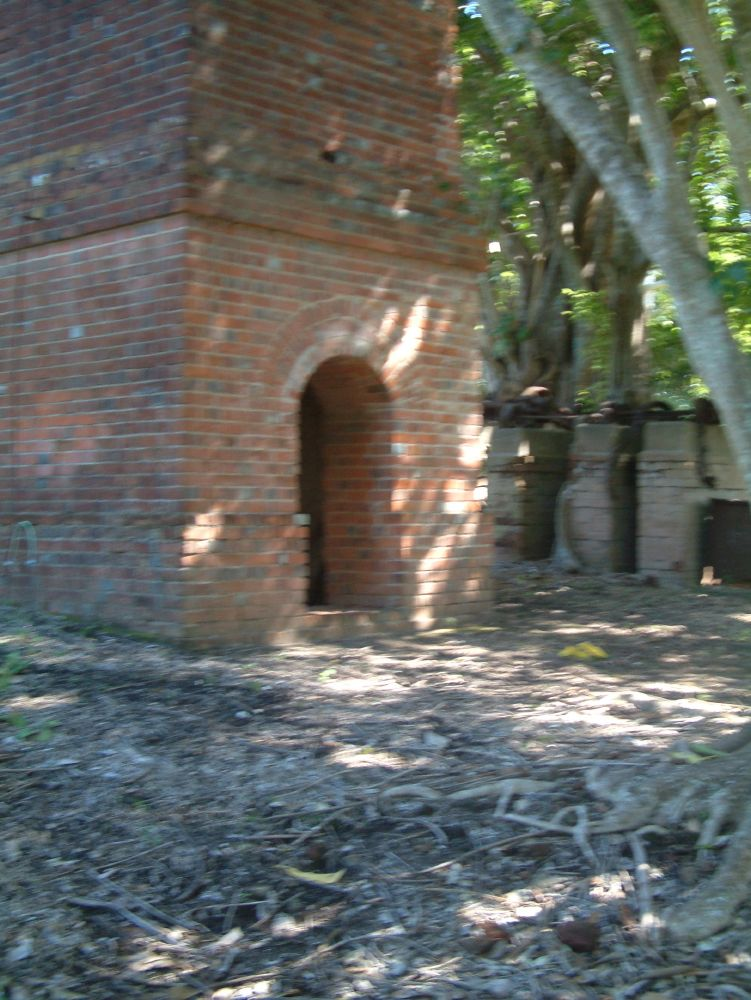
- Chimney, Richmond Mill, 2005

- Location within Queensland Location within Australia
- 21.0816°S 149.1458°E
- Location: Habana Road, Richmond, Mackay, Mackay Region, Queensland, Australia

History
- Design period: 1870s–1890s (late 19th century)
- Built: 1881

Queensland Heritage Register
- Official name: Richmond Mill Ruins, Richmond Mill
- Type: state heritage (built, archaeological)
- Designated: 4 June 1996
- Reference no.: 601281
- Significant period: 1881 (fabric); 1881–1895 (historical)
- Significant components: garage, pit – machinery, machinery/plant/equipment – manufacturing/processing, mounting block/stand, residential accommodation – workers' quarters, fireplace, well, objects (movable) – manufacturing/processing, chimney/chimney stack, residential accommodation – manager's house/quarters

Richmond Mill Ruins is a heritage-listed sugar cane mill at Habana Road, Richmond, Mackay, Mackay Region, Queensland, Australia. It was built in 1881. It is also known as Richmond Mill. It was added to the Queensland Heritage Register on 4 June 1996.

== History ==
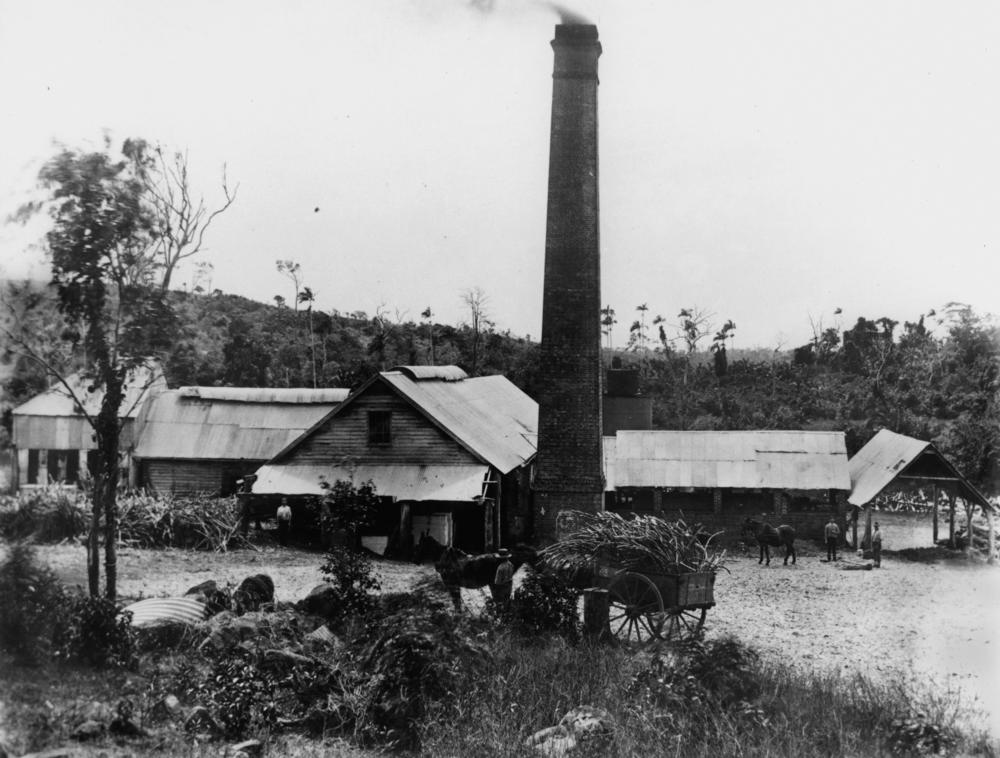
Richmond sugar mill, 1895

Richmond Mill, Mackay was constructed in 1881 for John McBryde and Hector McKenzie Finlayson on 10 acres they purchased from the Richmond Estate. It was the first central mill in the district.

The pastoral lands of the Pioneer Valley had been discovered by John Mackay and an exploration party in May 1860. Rapid settlement followed as settlers took advantage of the recently proclaimed Land Act to occupy the rich country of the area. Through the 1860s large pastoral holdings were established throughout the valley, but these were challenged when the Queensland Government introduced legislation in 1868 to encourage closer settlement. By the early 1880s most pastoral land in the Pioneer Valley had been converted to agricultural land.

It is thought that sugar was first planted in the valley in 1865 on the Pioneer Plantation. Sugar production was encouraged by the Queensland Government because consumption of sugar in industrialised countries had increased enormously and supply had decreased as a result of the American Civil War. The British Government, through its Sugar and Coffee Regulations of 1864, also sought to encourage production of sugar in the colonies. By 1875, approximately 5,000 acres was under sugar cultivation in the Pioneer Valley.

The Richmond Estate, selected in 1870 by Hugh McCready, was located in the Pioneer Valley, North Queensland. It is believed that Andrew Cumming was in partnership with McCready and that the plantation took its name from one owned by Cumming on St Vincent Island, West Indies.

Cane production in the Pioneer Valley fell during the 1870s when rust disease destroyed most of the crops. During this time farmers concentrated on improving their production techniques and were more selective about the type of cane they planted. By the early 1880s, rust disease was under control and cane production doubled.

To meet the resulting increase in demand for milling facilities, the Richmond Sugar Company was formed in 1881, the principals being Scotsmen John McBryde and Hector McKenzie Finlayson. John McBryde had first settled at Rockhampton in 1863 where he established a coconut plantation and bred horses. Prior to 1878 he went to the Pioneer Valley where he formed a partnership with Finlayson to breed horses and grow cane on Glenalbyn, North Side. They also owned the Inverness Plantation with FW Poolman.

The aim of the Richmond Sugar Company was to develop a central mill to process cane for farmers in the surrounding district. The mill, which did not have its own plantation but relied solely on product from surrounding farms, has been hailed as a forerunner of the central mill concept because it was established four years before centralised milling became common in Mackay. Its establishment encouraged speculative investment in similar mills and investment in cane production because producers were now able to get their cane milled without having to process it themselves.

For a short while the Richmond Mill was the only central mill north of Bundaberg. It produced both golden syrup and refined sugar. The golden syrup was produced in the off season using a charcoal filter process. The company won awards at the Mackay Show in 1883 for golden syrup and its white sugar won first prize at the Melbourne Exhibition in 1888. They also won a medal in 1886 at the British Industries Exhibition in London for sugar refining and a medal in 1883 at the British Industries Exhibition in South Africa for sugar refining.

Mr Blackmore was the designer of the mill buildings and engineer for the construction of the machinery which was imported from A & W Smith of Glasgow. The mill was made up of a simple set of rollers 117 centimetres (46 in) long and 56 centimetres (22 in) in diameter and was driven by a 50 horsepower (37 kW), horizontal steam powered engine with two boilers. It was the first mill in the Mackay district to be driven by steam rather than fire heated batteries when Aspinall steam heated evaporative batteries were installed.

The machinery was housed in a cathedral-shaped building, 44 metres (144 ft) long and 9 metres (30 ft) wide, with the wings 9 by 6 metres (30 by 20 ft). The juice tank, measuring 7 metres (23 ft) in diameter by 1,120 millimetres (44 in) in depth, with a 100-millimetre (3.9 in) pipe outlet, was built under the floor of the factory offices. William Robertson of the Victoria Foundry, Mackay built the 20 metres (66 ft) high chimney stack. It is similar in design to the Cornish boiler stacks of early North Queensland mining towns and was constructed of locally made brick. This brick, marked with an "H", most probably came from either Hardwick Brickworks in West Mackay or Hayward Brickworks at Walkerston. The machinery and building cost £10,000.

The mill was supplied by up to 7330 gallons of water per hour pumped from the nearby creek by a Cameron Pump. Within a short time a 9-metre (30 ft) deep well was constructed when the creek ran dry during a drought year. This well was built with two skins of brick, 230 millimetres (9.1 in) thick. It is believed that the well remained in use on the property until after the Second World War, when a windmill was built over it.

The Pioneer Valley became an attractive investment prospect as sugar production expanded and demand increased. With the growth in the industry the Victorian Sugar Company, a subsidiary of the Colonial Sugar Refining Company, was formed. The company bought 16,000 acres of land in the district and erected the Homebush sugar mill to process its crop. At the same time the company continued to purchase sugar from smaller farmers. Other southern investors followed the lead of CSR which spelt the end for smaller enterprises such as the Richmond Mill.

The industry had reached a peak by the early 1880s and unfortunately inefficiencies in the industry were exposed when world sugar prices fell. Further pressure was placed on the industry when the government banned the importation of South Sea Islands labour. The resulting high cost of wages crippled the industry.

By 1888 the Richmond Mill was only producing 75 tons of sugar and in 1894 the mill and the Richmond Estate plantations were offered for sale. The mill was closed in 1895 and a caretaker appointed.

William Begg Fordyce arrived from Scotland in 1888. He came to the mill as a ploughman and was later appointed caretaker/manager. After his appointment Fordyce appears to have been involved in dismantling the mill. The buildings were removed along with most of the mill machinery. The stack, boiler, juice pan, well and machinery foundations remain on the site. Fordyce, who as manager shared in the mill profits, later purchased up to 1,000 acres of the former Richmond Estate, including the Richmond Mill site.

The present owner of the mill site is Mr EC Denman, who is the great-grandson of Andrew Cumming, original owner of the Richmond Estate, through the marriage of Cumming's daughter Helen Jane to Edward Denman.

== Description ==
The Richmond Mill is situated on the Habana Road, about 14 kilometres (8.7 mi) from Mackay on its northern side. The ruins of the mill are now part of a small private property of some 4.5 acres, surrounded by undulating canefields. At present, the Richmond Mill Ruins site includes the remnants of the mill train foundations, the brick chimney stack, the brick-lined well, a boiler, the juice tank, and many other artefacts including pans, tools and machinery parts. The mill site is in the north-eastern corner of the present property, with Habana Road running parallel to the southern boundary. Near the entrance from the road are the remains of a brick kitchen fireplace and levelled ground indicating the site of the original homestead. Behind the present residence is further levelled ground reputed to be the site of the manager's house. Towards the centre of the site are several ruinous timber and corrugated iron buildings which were also part of the mill complex. The first is the old garage, then the single-roomed caretaker-manager's quarters with a small verandah on its south side, and the larger workmen's' quarters, which has partially collapsed. It is believed there were other workmen's quarters to the west of this building.

To the north of the timber outbuildings is a grove of trees on a slight bank, in which is nestled the juice tank. Still in its original location, the steel sides of the tank measure some 7 metres (23 ft) in diameter and 1.12 metres (3 ft 8 in) in depth, with a 100-millimetre (3.9 in) pipe outlet. Its top is no longer enclosed, and the offices and laboratory which reputedly sat above no longer exist.

Then in a partial clearing at the north-east corner of the property are the ruins of the mill, still in its setting of canefields. The most dominant feature of the mill is the brick chimney stack, which is still visible from the road. It is some 20 metres (66 ft) high, slightly tapered and finished with corbelled and dentil courses at the top. The bricks measure 9" by 4" by 3", and are laid in English bond separated by 15 millimetres (0.59 in) of sand/lime mortar. At the base are two openings on opposite sides with arched brick lintels. On the eastern face is the remains of the lightning conductor. On the inside faces of the stack are recesses in the brickwork which apparently were for housing the scaffolding as the stack was constructed.

Beside the stack is an open pan, some 2.2 metres (7 ft 3 in) in diameter. It is said to have come from the nearby Inverness Mill, but is very similar to the one which was at the Richmond Mill, which was said to have been mounted on a brick base. To the north of the stack is an area of brick paving believed to be the floor of the mill building. Within this paving are holes which may have been for the vacuum pan stand, under which was housed the smaller 12 horsepower (8.9 kW) engine. Also in this area is another brick and concrete stand and a shallow pit, about one metre in diameter which is partially collapsed. Further to the north is a concrete trough which housed the fugals, which were driven by belts from the nearby 12 horsepower (8.9 kW) engine. Here centrifugal spinning separated the molasses from the granule sugar.

To the west of the stack are three pairs of brick and concrete stands being the foundations of the mill train, which carried the rollers and engines. At present, several fig trees have taken root and are growing over these foundations. There are remnants of the rollers and other machinery on one pair of foundations. To the west of the foundations once ran the carrier, which transported the cane from where it was unloaded into the rollers. It was a continuous belt of timber slats housed in steel chains running between axles, and remnants of these chains and axles remain. Beside the foundations is a copper tray, also reputedly from a nearby mill. To the east of the stack is the remains of a boiler. It was one of two which provided steam for the larger 50 horsepower (37 kW) engine which powered the mill. It was located beside the stack originally.

At the north-east corner of the site is the well. It is some 9 metres (30 ft) deep with about a metre of silt at the bottom. Constructed of brick, it has only the top seven courses mortared. Recent remedial work has included the addition of a second brick skin to the exterior to strengthen its walls.

The site immediately to the south of the well is believed to be that of the blacksmith's shop, and to the west several holes now filled indicate this was probably the site of the refinery. Scattered through the site is a large collection of artefacts including tools and machinery parts from this mill site and other locations.

== Heritage listing ==
Richmond Mill Ruins was listed on the Queensland Heritage Register on 4 June 1996 having satisfied the following criteria.

The place is important in demonstrating the evolution or pattern of Queensland's history.

Richmond Mill is important in demonstrating the evolution of Queensland's history because of its contribution to the early sugar refining industry and as an example of the earliest central milling process in the Mackay district.

The place demonstrates rare, uncommon or endangered aspects of Queensland's cultural heritage.

The site demonstrates a rare and endangered aspect of Queensland's history because the mill chimney stack is the last remaining stack in the district.

The place has potential to yield information that will contribute to an understanding of Queensland's history.

The place has the potential to reveal information which could contribute to an understanding of Queensland's heritage, the mill remnants being important in demonstrating the early use of steam power in the sugar extraction process, which was first introduced to the Mackay district at Richmond Mill.

The place is important because of its aesthetic significance.

The Mackay community, which has a strong and active interest in its history, values the Richmond Mill Ruins because of its association with the early sugar industry and for the landmark and aesthetic qualities of the chimney stack.

The place has a strong or special association with a particular community or cultural group for social, cultural or spiritual reasons.

The Mackay community, which has a strong and active interest in its history, values the Richmond Mill Ruins because of its association with the early sugar industry and for the landmark and aesthetic qualities of the chimney stack.

== See also ==
- List of tramways in Queensland
