= Grapetree, Queensland =

Grapetree
- Suburb
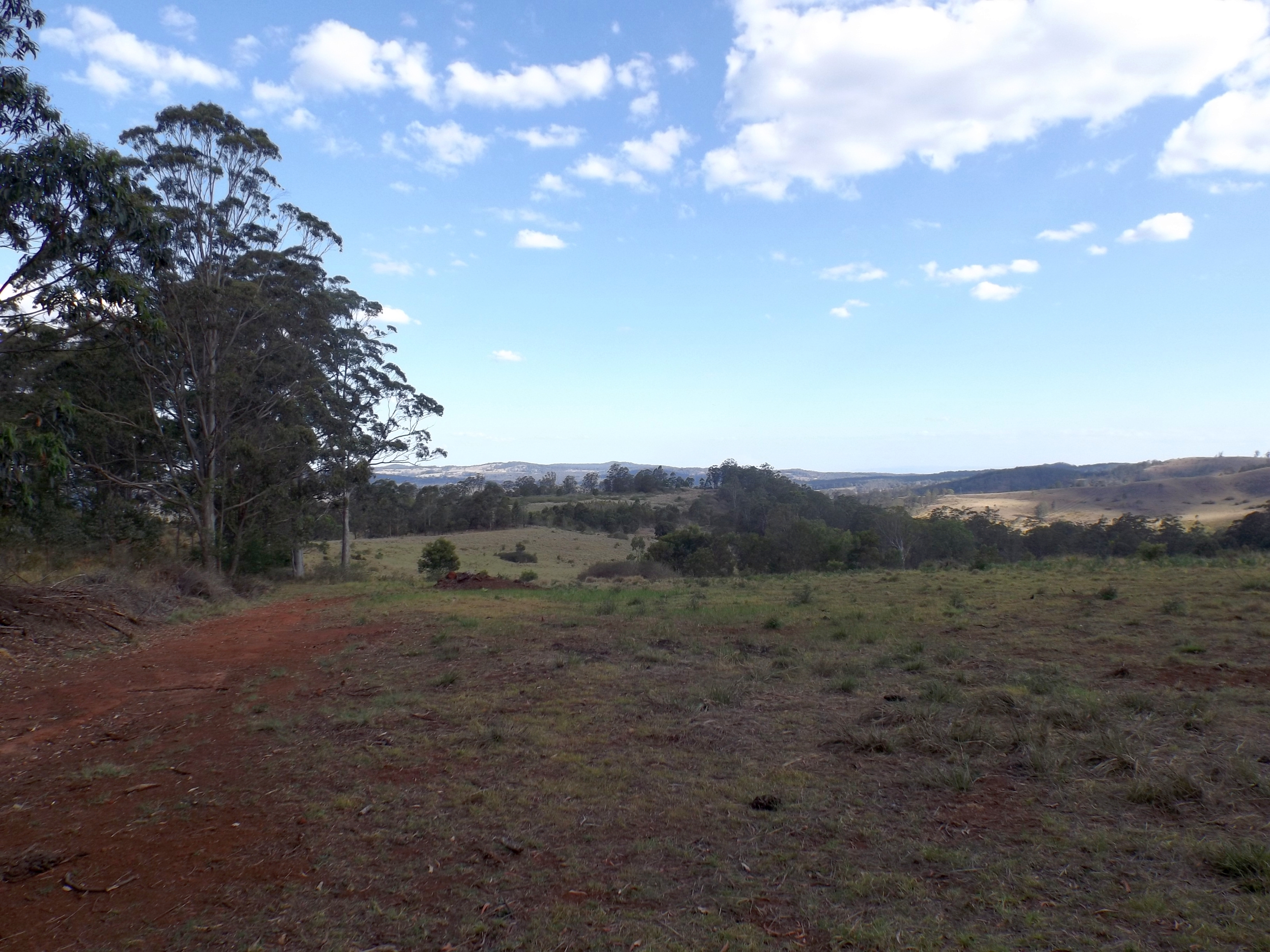
- Grapetree landscape, 2014

- Interactive map of Grapetree
- Coordinates: 27.3216°S 152.0994°E
- Country: Australia
- State: Queensland
- LGA: Toowoomba Region
- Location: 10.9 km (6.8 mi) SSE of Crows Nest; 27.0 km (16.8 mi) NE of Highfields; 38.7 km (24.0 mi) NE of Toowoomba CBD; 149 km (93 mi) W of Brisbane

Government
  - State electorate: Condamine
  - Federal division: Maranoa

Area
  - Total: 23.1 km^{2} (8.9 sq mi)

Population
  - Total: 42 (2021 census)
  - Density: 1.818/km^{2} (4.71/sq mi)
- Time zone: UTC+10:00 (AEST)
- Postcode: 4352
Suburbs around Grapetree
Crows Nest	Crows Nest	Crows Nest
Pechey	Grapetree	Ravensbourne
Hampton	Perseverance	Ravensbourne

Grapetree is a rural locality in the Toowoomba Region, Queensland, Australia. In the 2021 census, Grapetree had a population of 42 people.

== Geography ==
Perseverance Creek forms part of the eastern boundary of Grapetree. Grape Tree Creek rises in the south-west of the locality and flows through the locality to the eastern boundary, where it becomes a tributary of Perseverance Creek (27.3347°S 152.1147°E).

The New England Highway forms part of the south-west boundary of the locality, entering the locality from the west (Pechey) and exiting to the south-west (Hampton).

The southern extent of Crows Nest National Park occupies the eastern half of Grapetree. A small section of Pechey State Forest lies adjacent to the New England Highway which forms part of the western boundary. Apart from these protected areas, the land use is predominantly grazing on native vegetation.

== History ==
The locality was originally called Grape Tree, presumably after Grape Tree Creek. The locality was officially named Grapetree in 2005. It was part of the Shire of Crows Nest until 2008 when the local government area was amalgamated into the Toowoomba Region.

== Demographics ==
In the 2016 census, Grapetree had a population of 32 people.

In the 2021 census, Grapetree had a population of 42 people.

== Education ==
There are no schools in Grapetree. The nearest government primary school is Crow's Nest State School in neighbouring Crows Nest to the north-west. The nearest government secondary school is also Crow's Nest State School (to Year 10). For secondary schooling to Year 12, the nearest government secondary school is Highfields State Secondary College in Highfields to the south-west. There are two non-government primary-and-secondary schools in Highfields.

== Facilities ==
Despite the name, the Crows Nest water treatment plant is at 700 Grapetree Road (27.3101°S 152.0728°E).
