= Esk National Park =

National park in Australia

Coordinates: 27°17′42″S 152°19′11″E

Esk National Park is a national park in South East Queensland, Australia. It is located in Redbank Creek, in the Somerset Region of Queensland, Australia. The park was gazetted in 2006. The park's primary objective is to safeguard a remnant area of significant biodiversity value.

Located within the Brisbane River catchment area, Esk National Park enjoys a subtropical climate.

== See also ==
- Protected areas of Queensland
