= Palmtree, Queensland =

Palmtree
- Suburb
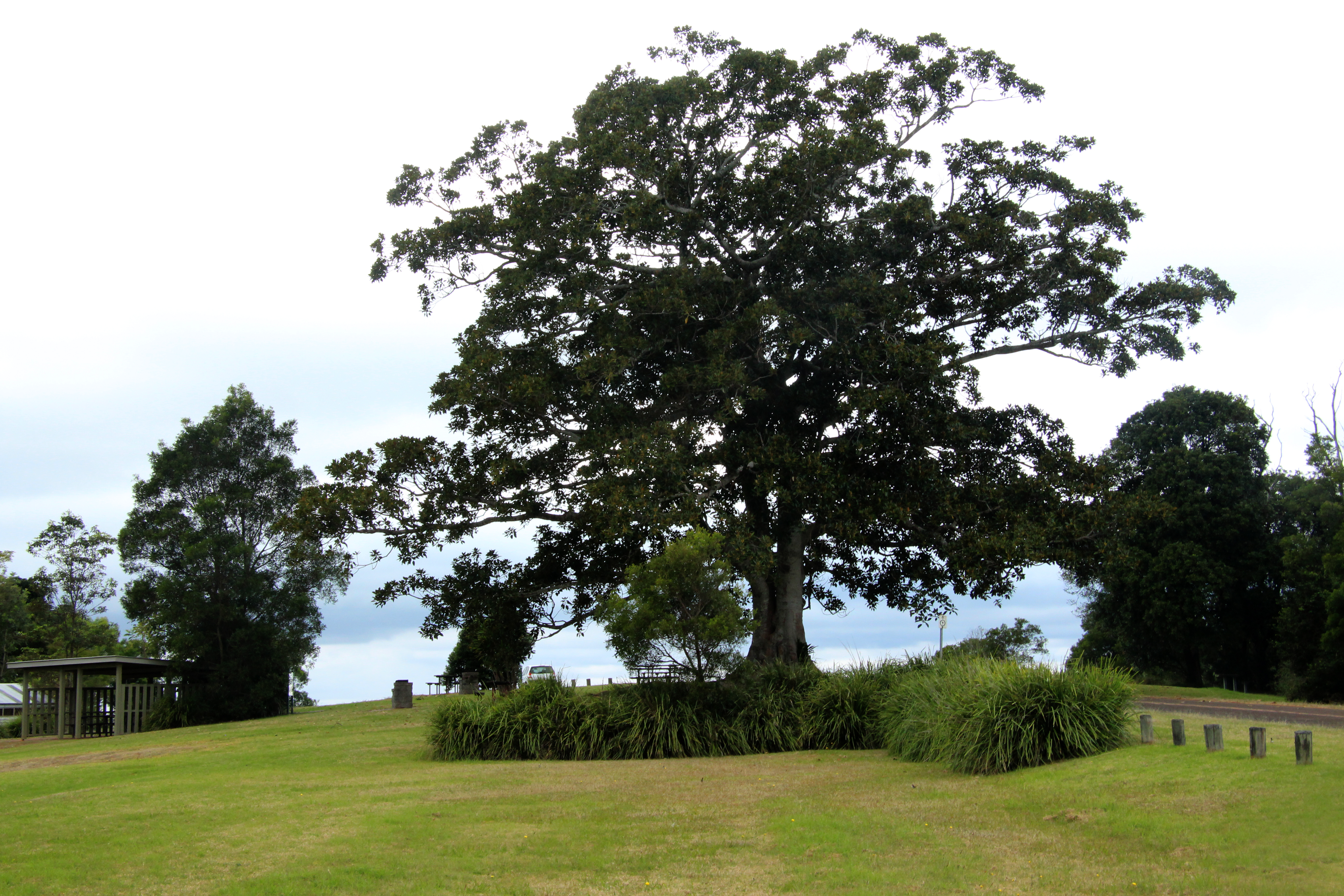
- Gus Beutel lookout, 2016

- Interactive map of Palmtree
- Coordinates: 27.4066°S 152.1486°E
- Country: Australia
- State: Queensland
- LGA: Toowoomba Region
- Location: 21.6 km (13.4 mi) SSE of Crows Nest; 29.0 km (18.0 mi) ENE of Highfields; 36.5 km (22.7 mi) NE of Toowoomba CBD; 49.7 km (30.9 mi) NW of Gatton; 140 km (87 mi) W of Brisbane

Government
  - State electorate: Condamine
  - Federal division: Maranoa

Area
  - Total: 41.1 km^{2} (15.9 sq mi)

Population
  - Total: 80 (2021 census)
  - Density: 1.95/km^{2} (5.0/sq mi)
- Time zone: UTC+10:00 (AEST)
- Postcode: 4352
Suburbs around Palmtree
Perseverance	Ravensbourne	Buaraba
Hampton	Palmtree	Buaraba South
White Mountain	Seventeen Mile	Seventeen Mile

Palmtree is a rural locality in the Toowoomba Region, Queensland, Australia. In the 2021 census, Palmtree had a population of 80 people.

== Geography ==
Palmtree has the following mountains:

- Sugarloaf (Mount Williams) in the north-west of the locality (27.3912°S 152.0983°E) rising to 714 metres (2,343 ft) above sea level
- Mount Perseverance in the south-east of the locality (27.4135°S 152.1617°E) rising to 804 metres (2,638 ft) above sea level

A section of the Ravensbourne National Park is with the east of the locality (27.4006°S 152.1595°E).

Most of the east of the locality is undeveloped land. The land use in the rest of the locality is predominantly grazing on native vegetation.

== History ==
The locality takes its name from State School name first used 1901, for the settlement at the terminus of the Hampton Timber Tramway to the head of Perseverance Creek. The sawmill and tramway closed in 1936.

Palm Tree Provisional School opened in 1901. On 1 January 1909, it became Palm Tree State School. It closed in 1960. It was on the eastern side of Palmtree School Road (27.40740°S 152.14426°E).

In 1924, Gus Beutel received a 1 hectare (2.5 acres) block of land on a special lease. He developed a picnic area and lookout.

== Demographics ==
In the 2016 census, Palmtree had a population of 73 people.

In the 2021 census, Palmtree had a population of 80 people.

== Education ==
There are no schools in Palmtree. The nearest government primary school is Murphy's Creek State School in Murphys Creek to the south-west. The nearest government secondary schools are Crow's Nest State School (to Year 10) in Crows Nest to the north-west, Highfields State Secondary College (to Year 12) in Highfields to the south-west, and Lockyer District State High School (to Year 12) in Gatton to the south-east.

== Attractions ==
Gus Beutel Lookout is on National Park Road in the north-east of the locality (27.3728°S 152.1780°E).

== See also ==
- List of tramways in Queensland
