= Crows Nest National Park =

National park in Queensland, Australia

- IUCN category II (national park)
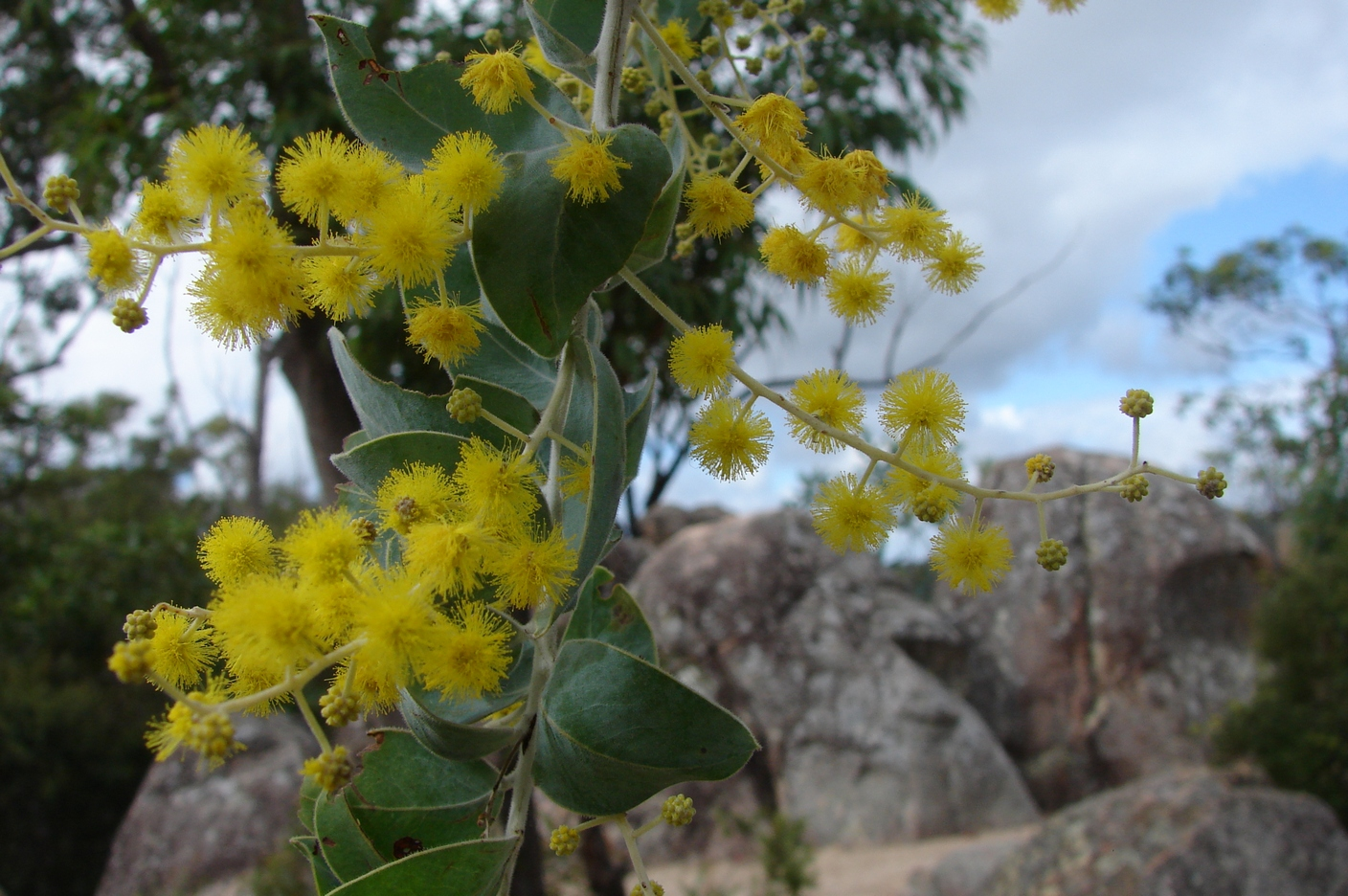
- Crows Nest National park (Geotagged)

- Location within Queensland
- Location: Queensland
- Nearest city: Crows Nest
- Coordinates: 27°15′14″S 152°4′27″E
- Area: 17.9 km^{2} (6.9 sq mi)
- Established: 1967
- Governing body: Queensland Parks and Wildlife Service
- Website: http://www.nprsr.qld.gov.au/parks/crows-nest/

Crows Nest National Park is a national park on the edge of the Darling Downs of southern Queensland, Australia. It is divided into a number of sections which are located in both Crows Nest and Grapetree, 40 km west of Esk in the South East Queensland bioregion. A 236 ha national park was first declared in 1967. The park has been extended south along the Great Dividing Range and now covers 17.9 km^{2} (6.91 sq mi). The average elevation of the terrain is 503 metres.

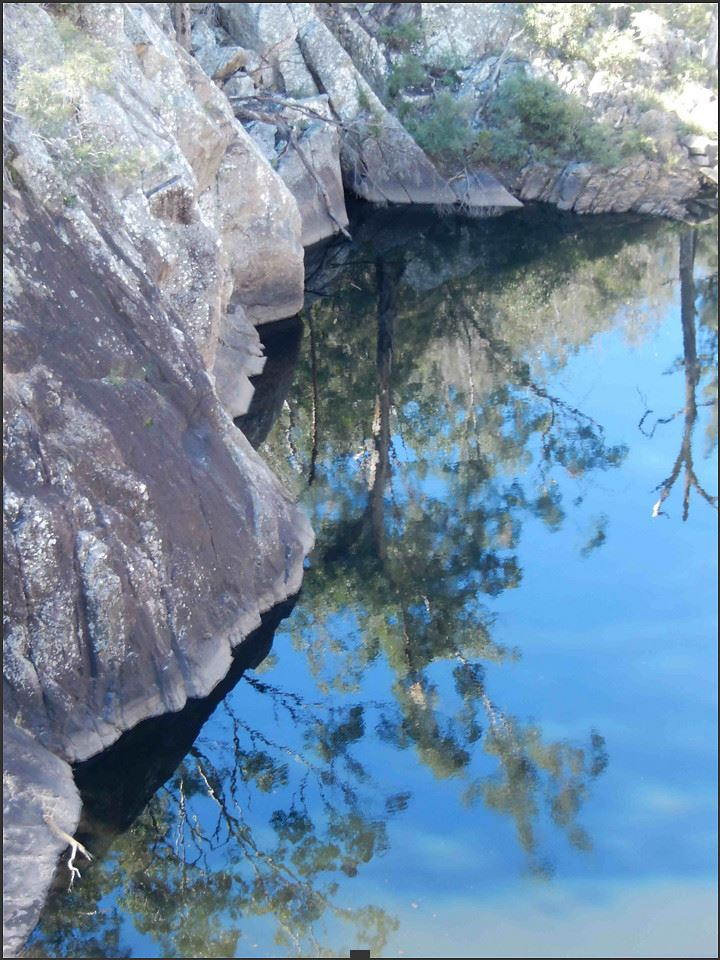
Reflections in a swimming hole, Crows Nest National Park, 2022

The geology of the area is dominated by domed granite outcrops. The vegetation in the park is mostly open eucalypt forest. Species such as the hoop pine, weeping bottlebrush, river she-oak and swamp mahogany can be found along creek banks. The main watercourse in the park is Crows Nest Creek, a tributary of Cressbrook Creek, itself a tributary of the Brisbane River. About 4% of the park is riverine wetlands.

Crows Nest National Park is known for its rugged landscape, waterfalls, and a sparkling gorge called the Valley of Diamonds. This valley is so named because of the mineral, feldspar, which glistens in the sunlight. Popular activities include visiting the lookouts and observing the heath wildflowers, wildlife and birdwatching. A total of 10 rare or threatened species have been identified in Crows Nest National Park. Some of them are on the verge of extinction, such as the brush-tailed rock-wallaby (Petrogale penicillata).

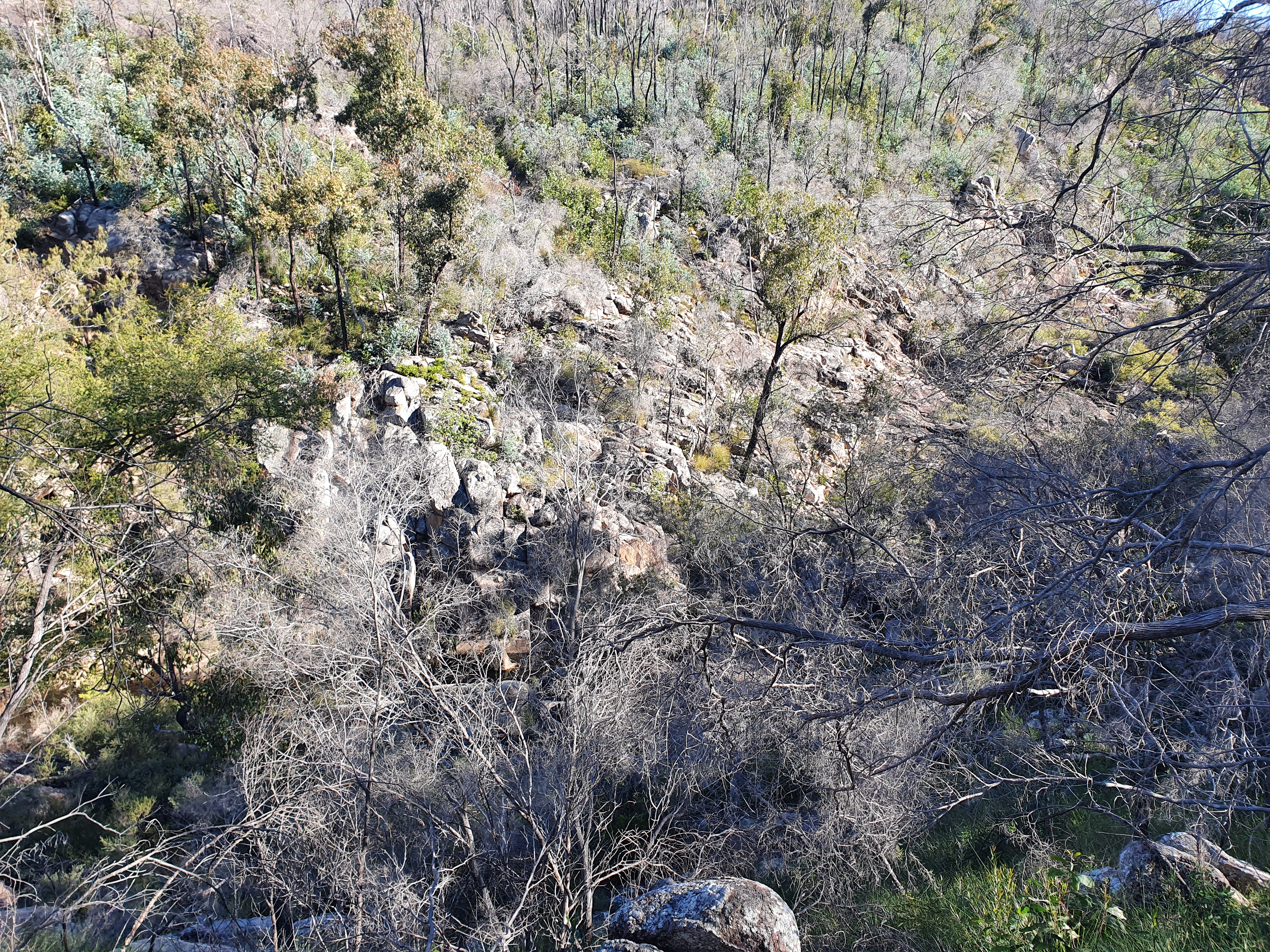
Boulders and outcroppings amid the wattles and bushfire recovery

== Facilities ==
The park has lookouts, walking tracks and facilities for picnics and camping, for which fees apply.

== See also ==
- Protected areas of Queensland
