= Esk–Hampton Road =

Highway in Queensland, Australia

Esk–Hampton Road Queensland
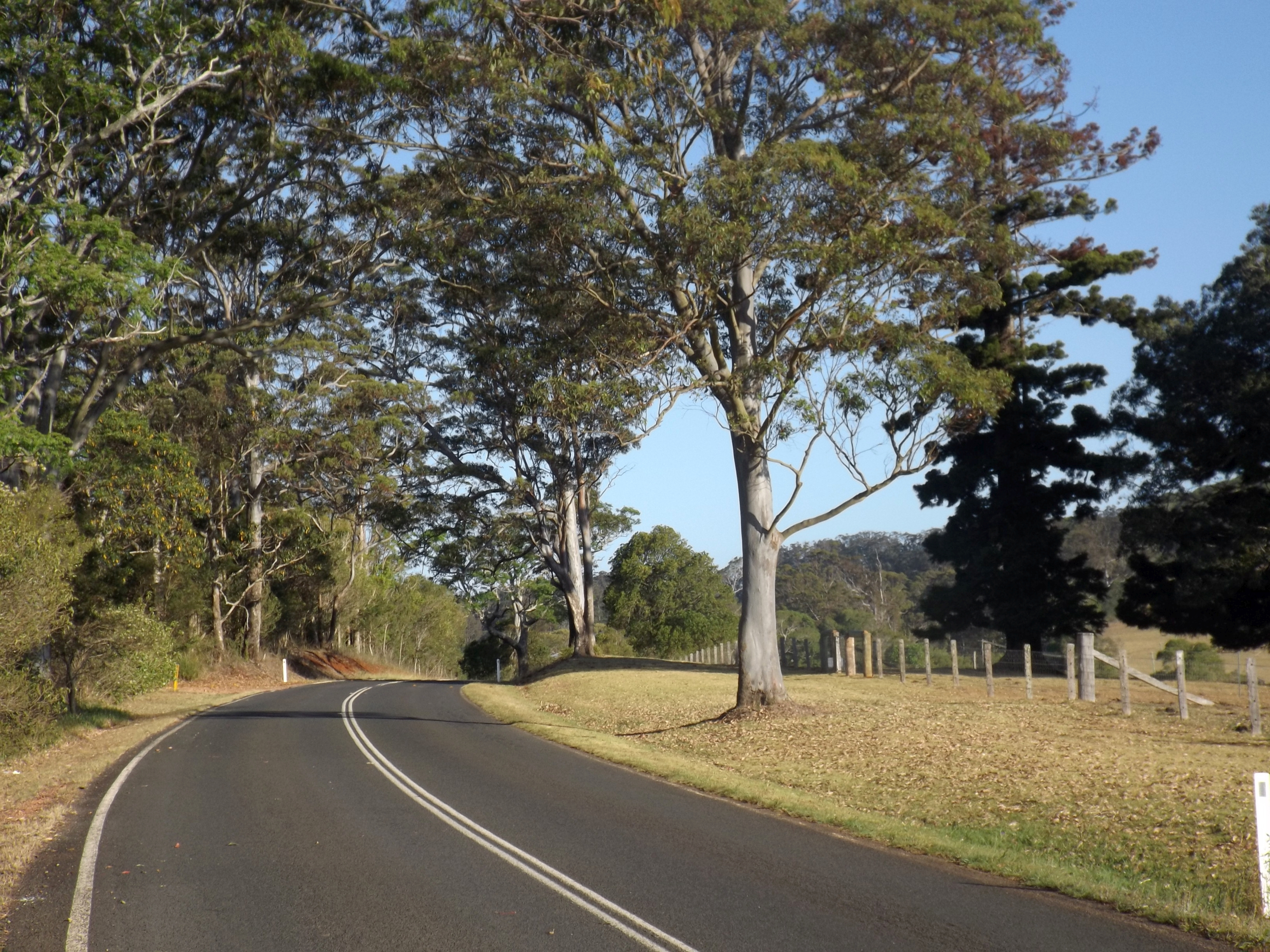
- Ravensbourne, 2014

General information
- Type: Highway
- Length: 45.7 km (28 mi)
- Route number(s): State Route 85 (Esk – Hampton)

Major junctions
- East end: Brisbane Valley Highway (National Route 17 / State Route 85), Esk
- West end: New England Highway (A3 / State Route 85), Hampton

Location(s)
- Major settlements: Ravensbourne

Highway system
- Highways in Australia; National Highway • Freeways in Australia; Highways in Queensland

The Esk–Hampton Road is a state highway in Queensland. It leaves the Brisbane Valley Highway at Esk and travels in a westerly direction for 45.7 km (28 mi) until it reaches the New England Highway at Hampton, where it ends. This road is part of State Route 85, which extends for over 570 km (354 mi) from Bribie Island to Nindigully, duplexing with the Brisbane Valley Highway (National Route 17) from the D'Aguilar Highway to Esk, the New England Highway (State Route A3) from Hampton to Toowoomba, the Gore Highway (National Route A39 - formerly 85) from Toowoomba to the Leichhardt Highway, and the southern 19 km (12 mi) section of the Leichhardt Highway (also National Route A39) to Goondiwindi.

Esk–Hampton Road is a state-controlled district road (number 414), rated as a local road of regional significance (LRRS).

== History ==
From a historical perspective the Esk–Hampton Road consists of three sections of approximately equal length.

The eastern section, from Esk to the foothills of the Great Dividing Range, was developed along Redbank Creek (the watercourse) to provide access to stands of timber, and to a sawmill that was located at Redbank Creek (the locality). Subsequently, it serviced farms that were established on land cleared of most old-growth forest.

The western section, from Hampton to the end of a spur of the Great Dividing Range, was also developed to facilitate the harvesting of timber. Prior to European settlement the rich volcanic soil on the ridge supported a sub-tropical rainforest, which contained timbers that were in high demand, including red cedar, tallowwood and hoop pine. These timbers were used in some homes constructed in the area at the time. The road later provided access to cleared land that was used for dairying and beef cattle grazing. This section provides access to Ravensbourne National Park, which preserves a remnant of the rainforest.

The central (mountain) section was developed later, to enable more direct travel between the two districts. The road is now a popular tourist drive, particularly as part of a round trip from the Brisbane area to the Toowoomba district. It is rated as a "good ride" by motorcycling tourists.

The mountain section (Note: In the reference the mountain section is described as the second section. This is because it was the second of two sections within the former Shire of Esk.) was completed in 1929. One of the most difficult sections to complete was the Pryde's Pinch section which had a steep gradient and was not suitable for traffic until sometime after 1932.

== Terrain ==
The Esk–Hampton Road climbs from an elevation of 117m at Esk to 719m at Hampton. Seven km of its length has an incline/grade of 5 to 10%, and 1.4 km has an incline/grade greater than 10%.

== Major intersections ==
LGA	Location	km	mi	Destinations	Notes
Somerset Region	Esk	0	0.0	Brisbane Valley Highway (National Route 17 / State Route 85) – Toogoolawah, Fernvale	North to Toogoolawah, south to Fernvale via Wivenhoe Dam
Somerset Region	Buaraba	32.3	20.1	National Park Road – Ravensbourne National Park	
Toowoomba Region	Hampton	45.7	28.4	New England Highway (State Route A3 / State Route 61) – Crows Nest, Toowoomba	North to Crows Nest, south to Toowoomba
1.000 mi = 1.609 km; 1.000 km = 0.621 mi

== See also ==
- Highways in Australia
- List of highways in Queensland
- List of highways numbered 85
