= Lahey's Canungra Tramway Tunnel =

Heritage-listed tunnel in Canungra, Queensland, Australia

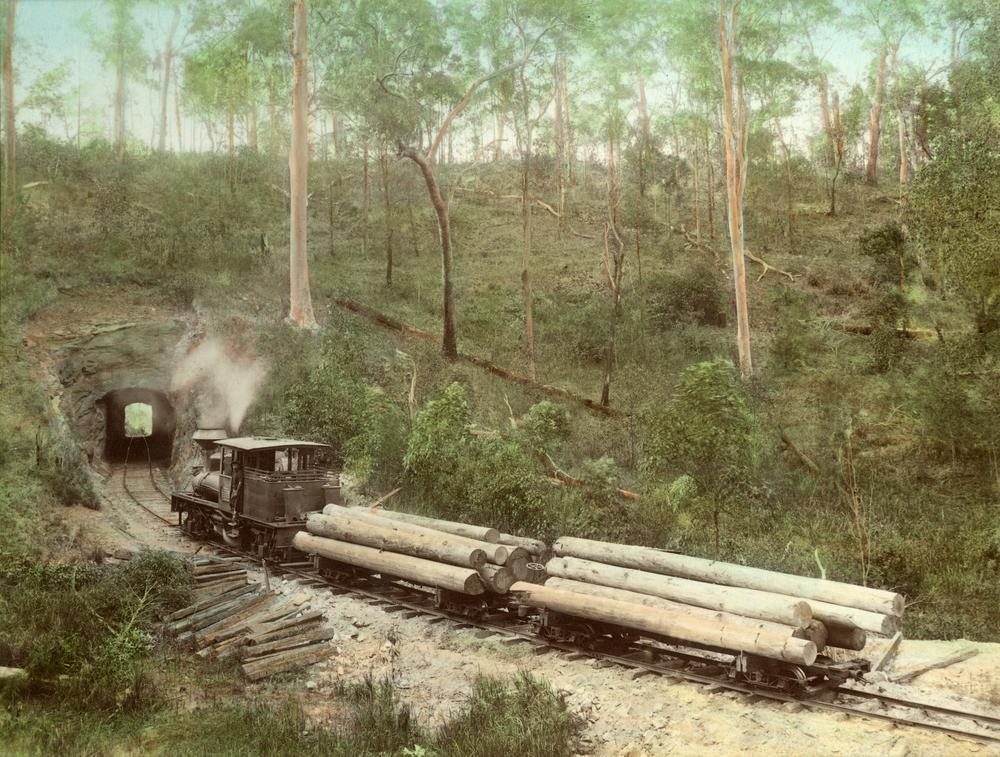
- Locomotive approaching the tunnel on the Canungra Sawmill tramway, 1912

- Location within Queensland Location within Australia
- 28.0231°S 153.1718°E
- Location: Canungra, Queensland, Australia

History
- Design period: 1900 - 1914 (early 20th century)
- Built: 1901 - 1903

Queensland Heritage Register
- Official name: Lahey's Canungra Tramway Tunnel
- Type: state heritage (built)
- Designated: 11 April 2005
- Reference no.: 602529
- Significant period: 1900s (fabric); 1903-c. 1933 (historical period of use); 1940s (wartime storage use)
- Significant components: graffiti, cutting - tramway, tunnel - tramway
- Builders: Mr Clark

Lahey's Canungra Tramway Tunnel is a heritage-listed tunnel on Laheys Tramway at Canungra, Queensland, Australia. It was built from 1901 to 1903 by Mr Clark. It was added to the Queensland Heritage Register on 11 April 2005.

== History ==
The Laheys Canungra Tramway Tunnel represents part of a large scale, privately constructed and operated tramway used between 1903 and 1930. The tramway tunnel was cut through solid sandstone, thereby negating any requirements for lining or support structures.

European settlement of the area surrounding the Coomera River commenced in 1843 with the establishment of the Tambourine holding. Early timber harvesting began in the 1860s by Hugh Mahony, who cut and hauled cedar logs to mills in Ipswich.

The Lahey family emigrated from their native Ireland to Australia in 1862. Francis Lahey, his wife and eleven children arrived in Sydney, but immediately travelled north to Brisbane. The family began farming in the Pimpama region in 1870. In 1875 Francis Lahey purchased a sugar mill and sawbench at Tygum, Waterford for his sons.

After being informed of the "good timber" in the region, David Lahey commenced work on the construction of the first sawmill in Canungra on 2 October 1884. During the same year David, John, Isaiah, Thomas and Evangeline Lahey all applied for and were granted selections of land around Canungra totaling over 3,000 acres (1,200 ha).

The mill at Canungra flourished during the first sixteen years of operation with timber readily obtained from the immediate area. The Lahey family expanded their business during this time, establishing an office in Brisbane in 1887, saw and planing mills at Beaudesert in 1888, the construction of a new mill at Canungra in 1897 after the original mill was destroyed by fire, and the construction of another mill at Widgee near Hill View in 1898.

By the turn of the 20th century, transportation of timber to the Canungra mill was becoming a problem. By this time the Laheys had acquired timber leases amounting to over 16,000 acres (6,500 ha) in the Canungra and Pine Creek Valleys, thereby requiring the slow and expensive bullock teams to haul logs over ever-increasing distances.

The Laheys saw mechanisation as the solution to their transportation problems. After a failed experiment with a steam traction engine, it was decided to build a tramway into the Pine Creek Valley to help keep transportation costs down. Steep grades and rugged terrain were an early problem in the design of the tramway. Various means of propulsion to cope with the steep grades and potentially heavy haulage weights were considered. A geared Climax locomotive, claimed to be capable of operating on grades as steep as 1 in 10, depending on haulage weight, was selected. A narrow gauge of 3 feet 6 inches (1.07 m) was also chosen to match that of the growing Queensland Government Railways, as it was hoped that the government line would eventually extend to Canungra (this finally occurred in 1914).

Tom Lahey and a Mr Clark were responsible for the selection of the tramway route. George Phillips, a celebrated civil engineer, was then engaged to make a detailed survey of the route, which was completed in February 1900. A contract was then let to Mr Clark for the initial construction. An immediate problem he faced was a ridge of the Darlington Range that separated the mill in Canungra from the timber leases in the Coomera Valley. After considering an expensive long circuitous route around the ridge formation, a tunnel cutting through the ridge was chosen with an approach grade of 1 in 12½ with short radius curves. The tunnel was pierced on 1 January 1901. First use of the tunnel was in September 1903.

The grade against loaded trains heading to the mill was kept to 1 in 16½. The downhill grade from the tunnel to the mill was steeper and considered dangerously steep. To overcome this, a safety switch was laid. During actual operations, no serious accidents occurred, though there are reports of "some exciting moments", being "due to greasy rails".

The tramway was extended over time. By 1910, the main line was 13.5 kilometres (8.4 mi) long, with a branch 2 kilometres (1.2 mi) up Flying Fox Creek and a sub-branch 500 metres (1,600 ft) up Little Flying Fox Creek to service a new aerial ropeway on Beech Mountain. Eventually, the total length of track laid amounted to 26.5 kilometres (16.5 mi).

Usage of the tramway continued to increase so that during 1915 alone, 15,000 short tons (14,000 t) of logs were hauled to the mill.

With the construction of the tramway came the preservation of belts of native vegetation alongside the tracks. The line "curved among waterfalls, ferns and thick scrub", and it was used by the locals for everyday transportation needs, with reports of locals sitting atop the logs, children using the tramway for rides to school and for picnickers hitching a ride to their destinations.

By 1920 much of the timber had been removed from the Canungra area. In 1920, the War Service Homes Commission purchased the whole milling operation and before long, closed the mill. David Lahey's company Brisbane Timbers Ltd, however, took over the remaining timber harvesting operations and the tramway was used sporadically for a few more years. Trips along the tramway by sightseers are recorded up till 1930. By June 1933, the line was being dismantled. In 1935, the rails and bogies were sold for scrap. During its period of use, the tramway collectively hauled approximately 130 million super feet of timber.

During the Second World War, the tunnel was used for the storage of ammunition for the nearby Kokoda Barracks at Canungra. Following the war the tunnel fell out of use, but has since been cleared out through work conducted under a Centenary of Federation grant project. The tunnel was officially re-opened for pedestrian and visitor use on 21 January 2001, but subsequently fenced off due to safety concerns.

== Description ==
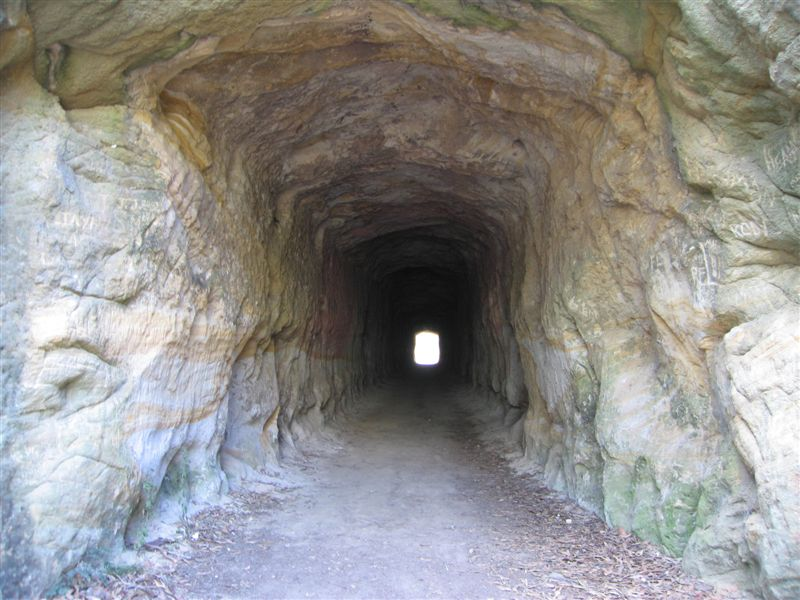
Laheys Canungra Tramway Tunnel, 2007

The tunnel was originally meant to be 88 yards (80 m) in length. However, its actual overall length is 91 metres (299 ft) plus an approach cutting at each end. The tunnel is straight, unlined and rectangular in section and cut through solid sandstone. On the walls of the tunnel is etched graffiti. The majority of graffiti is concentrated near the well-lit southeastern and northwestern entrances. Each entrance has an open approach cutting that extends from the tunnel. The northwestern entrance features two interpretive signs, one outlining the history of the tramway and tunnel, the other identifying the use of the tunnel during the Second World War.

Both entrances also feature waist high steel entrance barriers added to the site as part of the Centenary of Federation project. Neither of the modern interpretive signs or modern entrance barriers are of cultural heritage significance.

== Heritage listing ==
Lahey's Canungra Tramway Tunnel was listed on the Queensland Heritage Register on 11 April 2005 having satisfied the following criteria.

The place is important in demonstrating the evolution or pattern of Queensland's history.

The Laheys Canungra Tramway Tunnel is important in demonstrating the pattern of Queensland's history as an example of a privately built, owned and operated tramway. It is also important as a product of the development of the early timber getting and milling industries in Queensland.

The place demonstrates rare, uncommon or endangered aspects of Queensland's cultural heritage.

The place demonstrates uncommon aspects of Queensland's cultural heritage as an early example of one of the few tramway tunnels built in Queensland not requiring lining or support.

The place is important in demonstrating a high degree of creative or technical achievement at a particular period.

The tunnel is important in demonstrating the high degree of creative and technical achievement required to solve complex engineering problems associated with the construction of Queensland's early railways in challenging environments and through the use of new and untried technologies.

The place has a strong or special association with a particular community or cultural group for social, cultural or spiritual reasons.

The tunnel holds strong social significance for the community for its landmark values and for the contribution that the early timber industry and subsequent tramway operations had for the economic and cultural development of the Canungra region. The tunnel is also of social significance to the community as demonstrated by the installation of interpretive signing and the opening of the tunnel as a local tourist attraction.

The place has a special association with the life or work of a particular person, group or organisation of importance in Queensland's history.

The place has a special association with the life and work of several generations of the Lahey family, who have been influential in the development of the timber industry in southeastern Queensland, and in the general development of the Canungra area.

== See also ==
- Lahey's Canungra Sawmill
