= Nevada State Route 85 =

Two highways in the U.S. state of Nevada have been signed as Route 85:

- Nevada State Route 85 (1940s)
- Nevada State Route 85 (1970s)
