= Perseverance, Queensland =

Perseverance
- Suburb
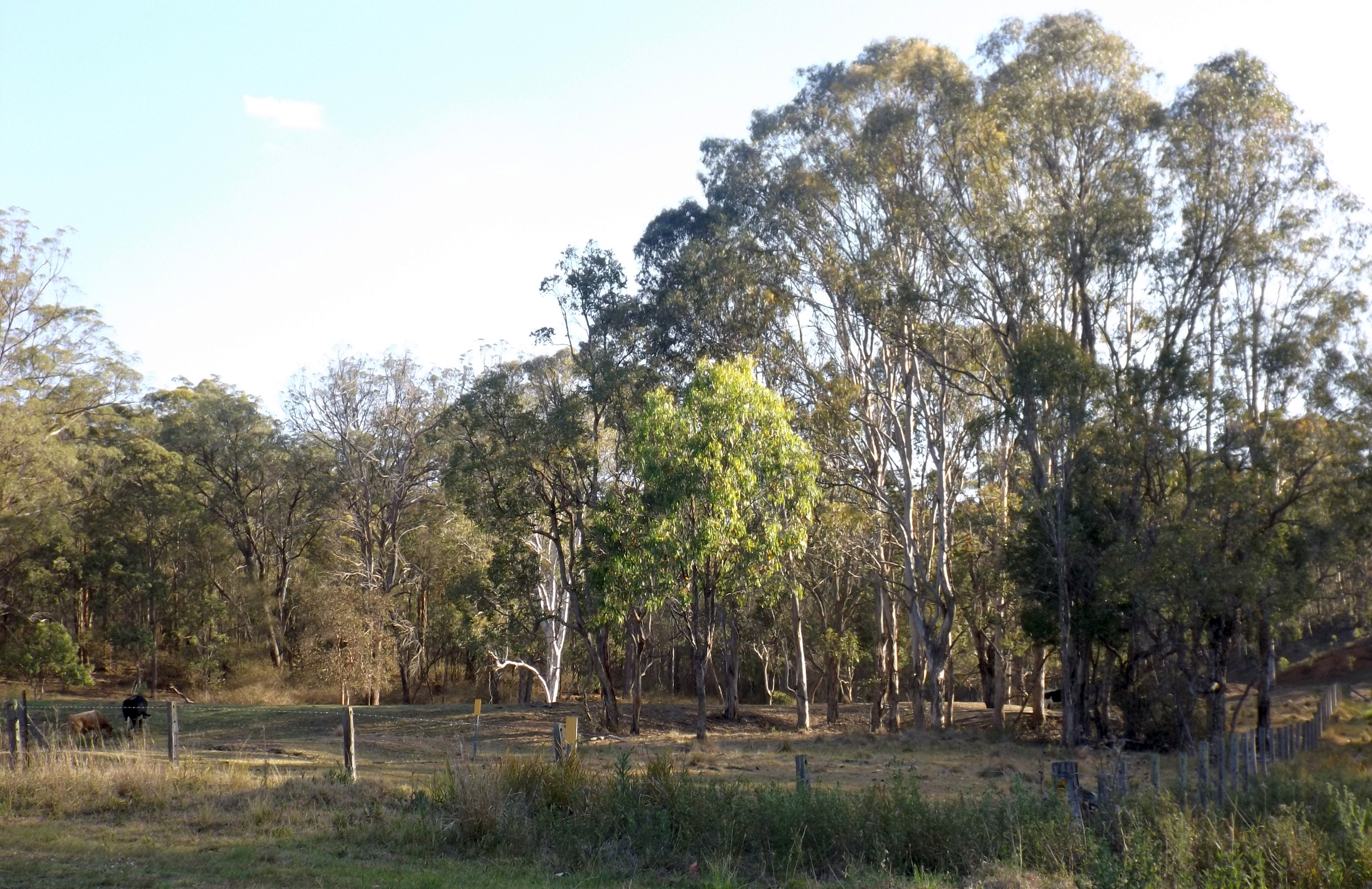
- Paddocks, 2014

- Interactive map of Perseverance
- Coordinates: 27.3694°S 152.1030°E
- Country: Australia
- State: Queensland
- LGA: Toowoomba Region
- Location: 23.6 km (14.7 mi) NE of Highfields; 35 km (22 mi) NE of Toowoomba CBD; 144 km (89 mi) W of Brisbane

Government
  - State electorate: Condamine
  - Federal division: Maranoa

Area
  - Total: 11.4 km^{2} (4.4 sq mi)

Population
  - Total: 72 (2021 census)
  - Density: 6.32/km^{2} (16.36/sq mi)
- Time zone: UTC+10:00 (AEST)
- Postcode: 4352
Suburbs around Perseverance
Hampton	Grapetree	Ravensbourne
Hampton	Perseverance	Ravensbourne
Hampton	Palmtree	Palmtree

Perseverance is a rural locality in the Toowoomba Region, Queensland, Australia. In the 2021 census, Perseverance had a population of 72 people.

== Geography ==
Perseverance is on the Darling Downs in southern Queensland.

The locality is crossed from east to west by the Esk–Hampton Road. Upper Creekbrook Creek forms part of the eastern boundary of Perseverance.

The land use is predominantly grazing on native vegetation.

== History ==
Perseverance Creek Provisional School opened on 10 November 1880. On 1 January 1909, it became Perseverance Creek State School. It closed briefly in 1925 to 1926 due to low student numbers. It permanently closed in 1944.

All Saints Catholic Church opened on Sunday 29 August 1909 by the Reverend D. Fouhy. In 1931, the church was enlarged and re-dedicated on Sunday 25 October 1931 by Bishop James Byrne. It closed and was sold in 1999. It was at 4025 Esk Hampton Road (western corner with Church House Road, 27.37755°S 152.11338°E). As at November 2023, the church building was still extant.

In 1914, land was purchased by the Methodists with the intention to build a church. A stump capping ceremony was held in October 1914. The church opened on 1 May 1915.

== Demographics ==
In the 2016 census, Perseverance had a population of 62 people.

In the 2021 census, Perseverance had a population of 72 people.

== Education ==
There are no schools in Perseverance. The nearest government primary schools are Geham State School in Geham to the south-west and Murphy's Creek State School in Murphys Creek to the south. The nearest government secondary schools are Crow's Nest State School (to Year 10) in Crows Nest to the north and Highfields State Secondary College (to Year 12) in Highfields to the south-west.

== Amenities ==
Perseverance Hall is on the south-west corner of Esk Hampton Road and Perseverance Hall Road (27.37846°S 152.11805°E).
