= A85 =

A85 or A-85 may refer to:

- Dutch Defence, in the Encyclopaedia of Chess Openings
- Gleaner A85, a combine harvester

== Roads ==
- A85 road (Scotland)
- Quebec Autoroute 85, a Canadian highway part of the Trans-Canada Highway
- A85 motorway (France)
