= Ravensbourne, Queensland =

Ravensbourne
- Suburb
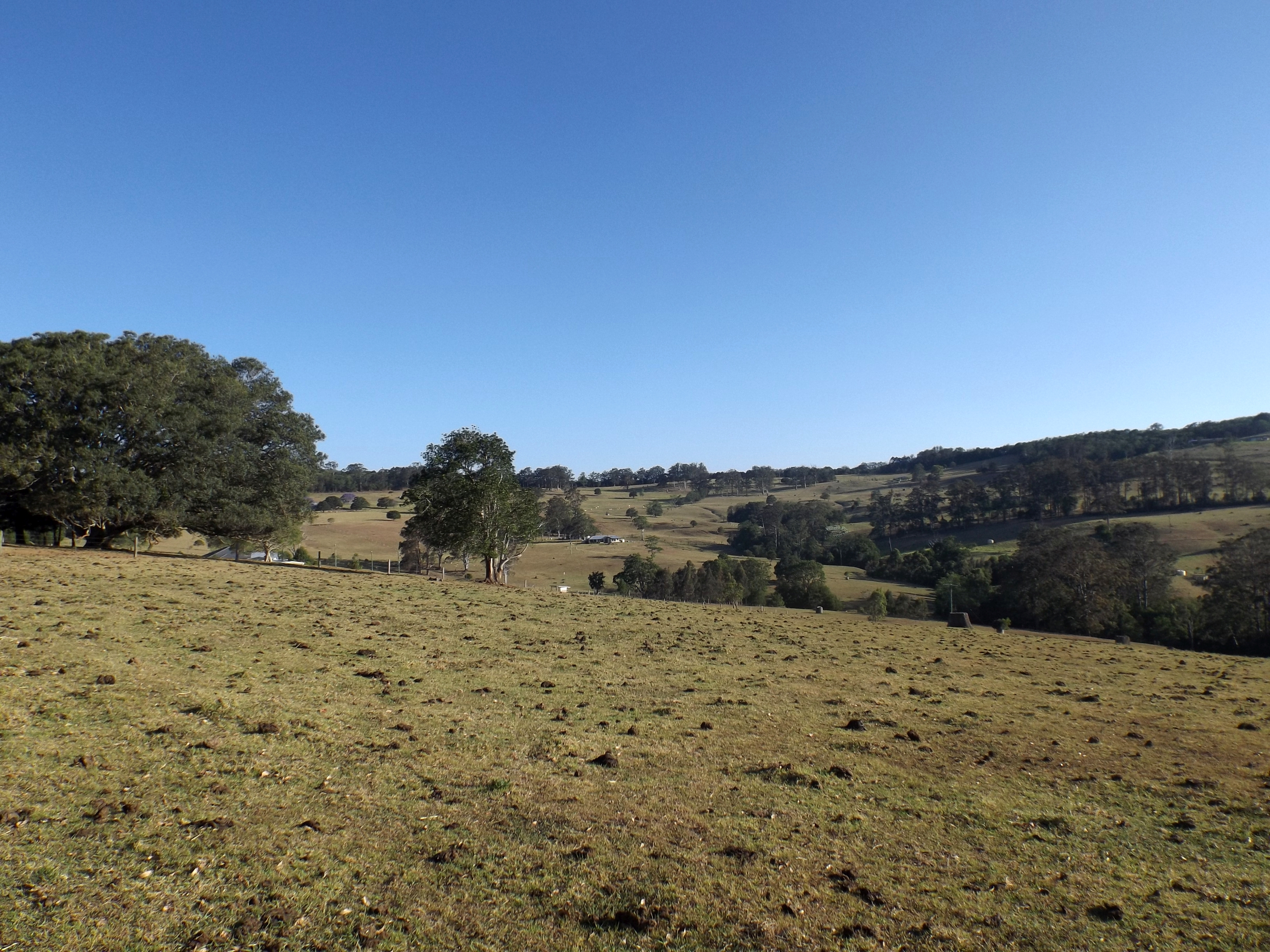
- The rolling hills of Ravensbourne, 2014

- Interactive map of Ravensbourne
- Coordinates: 27.3358°S 152.1586°E
- Country: Australia
- State: Queensland
- LGA: Toowoomba Region
- Location: 32.4 km (20.1 mi) NE of Highfields; 44.8 km (27.8 mi) NE of Toowoomba CBD; 102 km (63 mi) NW of Ipswich; 138 km (86 mi) W of Brisbane

Government
  - State electorate: Condamine
  - Federal division: Maranoa

Area
  - Total: 81.9 km^{2} (31.6 sq mi)

Population
  - Total: 307 (2021 census)
  - Density: 3.748/km^{2} (9.709/sq mi)
- Time zone: UTC+10:00 (AEST)
- Postcode: 4352
Suburbs around Ravensbourne
| Crows Nest | Cressbrook Creek; Biarra | Redbank Creek |
| Grapetree | Ravensbourne | Redbank Creek |
| Perseverance | Palmtree | Buaraba |

Ravensbourne is a rural locality in the Toowoomba Region, Queensland, Australia. In the 2021 census, Ravensbourne had a population of 307 people.

== Geography ==
The locality is on the Darling Downs in southern Queensland.

The locality is crossed from east to west by the Esk–Hampton Road.

Mount Jockey (27.2965°S 152.1584°E) is in the north of the locality rising to 607 metres (1,991 ft) above sea level.

In the far north is reservoir created behind the Cressbrook Dam. Most of the area is within the catchment of the dammed Cressbrook Creek, a tributary of the Brisbane River. However a small section in the southeast lies within the Lockyer Creek catchment. In this part lies the Ravensbourne National Park. In the west Perseverance Creek marks the boundary.

== History ==
Map showing the boundaries of the Ravensbourne locality and parish. Several historical sites are also marked including the tramway, saw mills and village settlement. Based on map data from Refs.

The locality takes its name from the parish, which in turn was named after the pastoral run belonging to a Mr Raven which was near a creek (called a bourne in many parts of England).

A reserve for camping was established in 1880 and cancelled in 1885.

A village settlement was established in the late 1880s including a post office and a half acre allotment for houses.

Ravensbourne Provisional School opened on 22 June 1891. On 1 January 1909, it became Ravensbourne State School. It closed on 31 December 1969. It was at the end of Ravensourne School Road off Post Office Road (27.3595°S 152.1609°E).

The school acted as a community meeting hall including for the Farmers' Association. Other additions included a general store and saw mill. The school, post office and general store are no longer in operation.

Few buildings remain in the original village. The site of the school is currently owned by the University of Southern Queensland and is marked as a scientific reserve. In 2003 Reushle Cottage was moved from Post Office Road (in Ravensbourne) to Hampton to act as the visitor information centre.

=== Agriculture & Lumber ===
Evidence of an Aboriginal yam dig site can be found in Ravensbourne national park.

Logging began in the 1860s and 1870s. By 1891 two mills serviced the area, one situated along Perseverance creek and another established circa 1891 closer to the Ravensbourne village settlement.

In 1889 when the Ravensbourne region was opened for selection, large areas were cleared for farming of maize, potatoes and dairy cows.

The rich soil has been used for a range of farming activities including vegetable and flower farming. Present day farming activities include cattle, avocados, limes and a range of other vegetables and meat products.

=== Mining ===
Gold prospecting was conducted at Bunkers Hill (located in the Ravensbourne region) in the 1870s and by 1932 the site had grown to 25 men. In 1933 deposits of gold, silver, copper and lead were discovered 22 feet (approximately 7 meters) underground. As with much of the gold mining in the Esk and Brisbane Valley regions, gold mining has remained a sideline compared to farming and grazing activities.

The region also hosts an open cut mine for Kaolin.

=== Transport ===
Early goods were transported by cart from the farms in Ravensbourne to Hampton and then by train from Hampton to Toowoomba for sale. In the 1920s trucks replaced carts for haulage to Hampton or directly to Toowoomba. Sometime after 1932 the Esk–Hampton Road became trafficable allowing access to the Brisbane Valley railway line.

Between 1907 and 1909 the Munro Tramway construction reached Ravensbourne, terminating at Bunkers Hill. The private tramway operated until 1936 haling timber and other freight between the loading stations, saw mills and rail connection at Hampton. Very little evidence remains of the tramway as most of the tramway steel was salvaged shortly after it ceased operation. A partially restored Shay locomotive recovered from Bunkers Hill is on display near the Ravensbourne National Park.

== Demographics ==
In the 2016 census, Ravensbourne had a population of 248 people.

In the 2021 census, Ravensbourne had a population of 307 people.

== Education ==
There are no schools in Ravensbourne. The nearest government primary schools are Crow's Nest State School in neighbouring Crows Nest to the north-west, Geham State School in Geham to the south-west, and Murphy's Creek State School in Murphys Creek to the south-west. The nearest government secondary schools are Crow's Nest State School (to Year 10), Highfields State Secondary College in Highfields to the south-west, and Lockyer District State High School in Gatton.

== Attractions ==
There are several short walks along the Munro Tramway and a partially restored Shay locomotive is visible from Esk–Hampton Road near Ravensbourne National Park.

Picnic areas and several short walks can be found at Ravensbourne National Park and the Gus Beutel Lookout.

Camping, kangaroos and water activities can be found at Cressbrook Dam and Perseverance Dam.
