= Hampton, Queensland =

Hampton
- Town
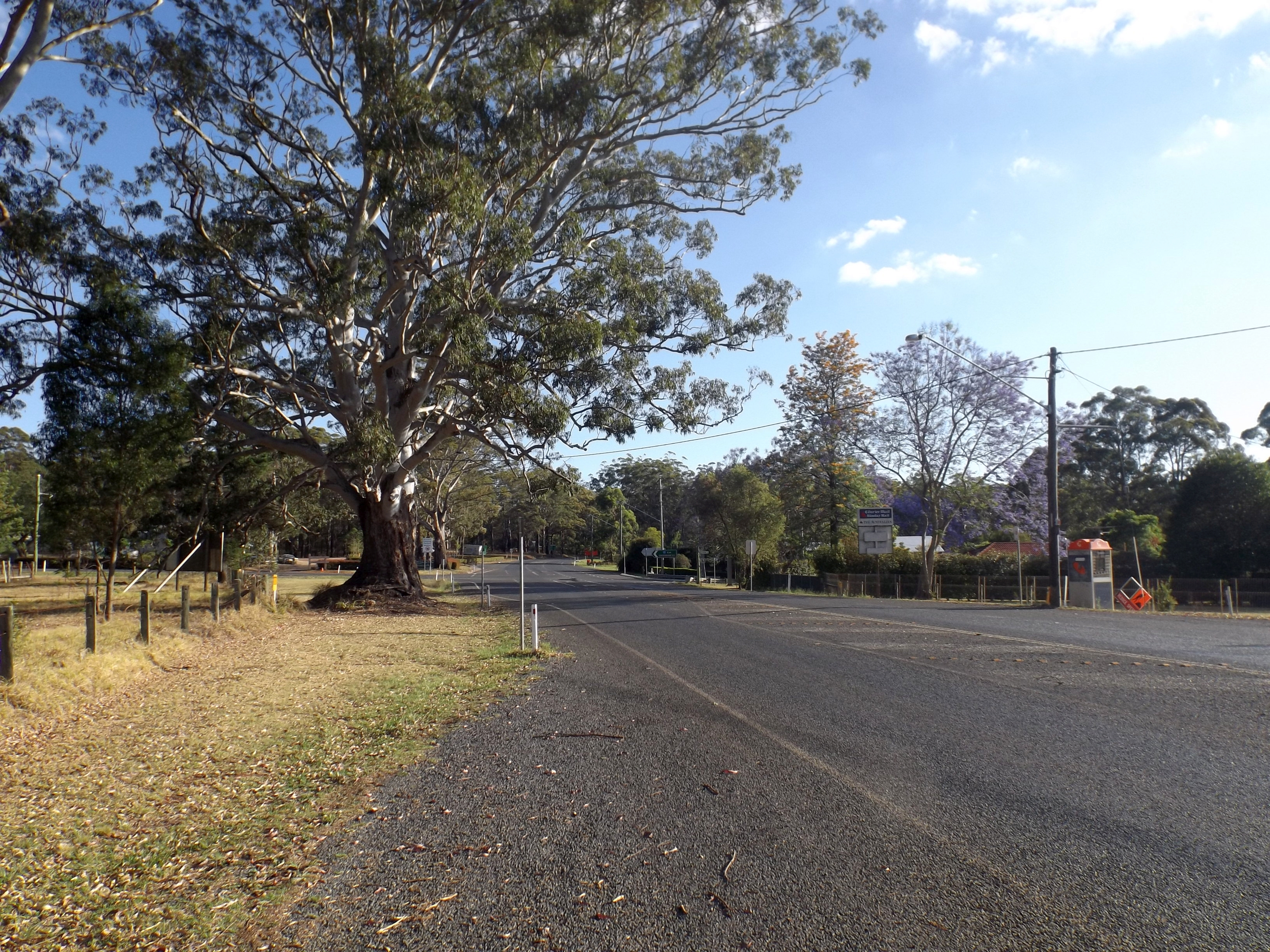
- New England Highway at Hampton, 2014

- Interactive map of Hampton
- Coordinates: 27.3561°S 152.0691°E
- Country: Australia
- State: Queensland
- LGA: Toowoomba Region
- Location: 12.1 km (7.5 mi) S of Crows Nest; 31.6 km (19.6 mi) NNE of Toowoomba CBD; 141 km (88 mi) W of Brisbane

Government
  - State electorate: Condamine
  - Federal divisions: Groom; Maranoa

Area
  - Total: 26.2 km^{2} (10.1 sq mi)

Population
  - Total: 469 (2021 census)
  - Density: 17.90/km^{2} (46.36/sq mi)
- Time zone: UTC+10:00 (AEST)
- Postcode: 4352
- County: Cavendish
- Parish: Crows Nest
Localities around Hampton
Pechey	Grapetree	Perseverance
Merritts Creek	Hampton	Perseverance
Mount Luke	Fifteen Mile	Palmtree; White Mountain

Hampton is a rural town and locality in the Toowoomba Region, Queensland, Australia. In the 2021 census, the locality of Hampton had a population of 469 people.

== Geography ==
Hampton is on the Darling Downs, 147 kilometres (91 mi) west of the state capital, Brisbane. Situated at the top of an escarpment on the Great Dividing Range, Hampton is one of the small town located along the New England Highway between Toowoomba, (29 kilometres away) and Crows Nest (12 kilometres).

There are three local dams that supply water to the surrounding area, all within a short distance of Hampton. These are Cooby Dam, Perseverance Dam and Cressbrook Dam. Recreational activities are available on some of the dams.

== Climate ==
Hampton has moderate summer temperatures with high temperatures around 27 °C (80.6 °F). The summer low temperature is around 16 °C (60.8 °F). Hampton also has mild winters with temperature highs close to 17 °C (62.6 °F), and low temperatures around 6 °C (42.8 °F). The local flora and fauna are abundant to include many species of birds and mammals. Eucalypt and pine forests as well as grass land are present in this area.

== History ==
The town was named after its former railway station, which in turn was named after Hampton then in Middlesex, England.

In 1886, the Crows Nest railway line reached the town.

Hampton Post Office opened on 19 May 1913 (a receiving office had been open from 1887) and closed in 1977.

Hampton State School opened on 22 August 1938. It closed in 1959.

== Demographics ==
In the 2011 census, the locality of Hampton had a population of 345 people.

In the 2016 census, the locality of Hampton had a population of 356 people.

In the 2021 census, the locality of Hampton had a population of 469 people.

== Education ==
There are no schools in Hampton. The nearest government primary schools are Geham State School in Geham to the south-west and Murphy's Creek State School in Murphys Creek to the south. The nearest government secondary schools are Crow's Nest State School (to Year 10) in Crows Nest to the north and Highfields State Secondary College (to Year 12) in Highfields, Toowoomba, to the south-west.

== Attractions ==
Hampton is known for the antique shop and gift stores as well as local produce, including citrus and avocados grown on the many farms located around the district. The Hampton Information Centre is located on the New England Highway at the junction of the Esk–Hampton Road. The road provides access to Ravensbourne National Park and connects Hampton to Esk. Ravensbourne National Park features short bushwalking tracks, a scenic lookout and picnic facilities. In May the park surrounding the Visitor Information Center plays host to the Hampton High Country Food and Art Festival. The festival gives local producers from all over the Darling Downs a chance to showcase their produce.
