= Ravensbourne National Park =

National park in Australia

- IUCN category II (national park)
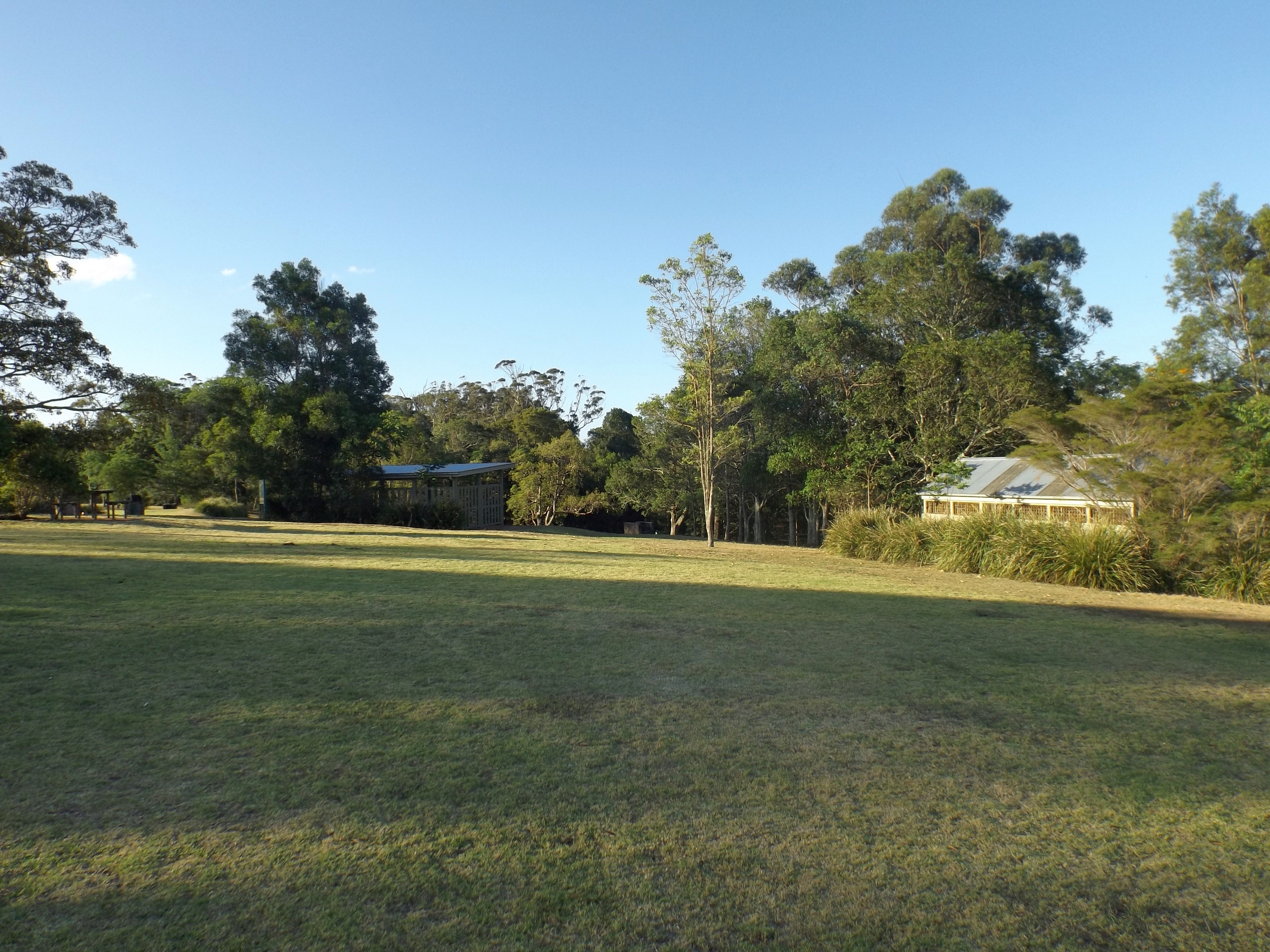
- Picnic area near Gus Beutel Lookout, 2014

- Location within Queensland
- Location: Queensland
- Nearest city: Toowoomba
- Coordinates: 27°21′24″S 152°12′06″E
- Area: 4.40 km^{2} (1.70 sq mi)
- Established: 1922
- Governing body: Queensland Parks and Wildlife Service
- Website: Official website

Ravensbourne National Park is located in the Ravensbourne and Buaraba in South East Queensland, Australia, 33 km west of Esk. This small scenic park sits on the Great Dividing Range within the Lockyer Creek water catchment area and overlooks the Lockyer Valley. Small remnants of the rainforest and wet eucalypt forest that once covered this part of the Great Dividing Range are preserved within the park. The park's red soils in the west and south-west support rainforest that includes eucalypt species, as well as palms, vines, and ferns. Sandy soils in the park's eastern section support open eucalypt forest. The park is situated within the catchment areas of the Brisbane River and Lockyer Creek.

== Fauna ==
Four rare or threatened species have been recorded in the park. Over 80 bird species have been recorded in the park.

== See also ==
- Protected areas of Queensland
