= South Talwood, Queensland =

South Talwood Queensland
- Coordinates: 28.6191°S 149.2969°E
- Population: 101 (2021 census)
  - Density: 0.1273/km^{2} (0.3297/sq mi)
- Postcode(s): 4496
- Area: 793.5 km^{2} (306.4 sq mi)
- Time zone: AEST (UTC+10:00)
- Location: 107 km (66 mi) W of Goondiwindi; 113 km (70 mi) SE of St George; 319 km (198 mi) WSW of Toowoomba; 450 km (280 mi) WSW of Brisbane
- LGA(s): Goondiwindi Region
- State electorate(s): Southern Downs
- Federal division(s): Maranoa
Suburbs around South Talwood:
Weengallon	North Talwood	Bungunya
Daymar	South Talwood	Bungunya
Mungindi	Mungindi (NSW)	Boomi (NSW)

South Talwood was a rural locality in the Goondiwindi Region, Queensland, Australia. It was on the border of Queensland and New South Wales. It was 107 kilometres (66 mi) west of Goondiwindi. In the 2021 census, South Talwood had a population of 101 people.

On 17 May 2024, the Queensland Government decided to amalgamate the localities of North Talwood and South Talwood into a single locality called Talwood (with the town of Talwood as its main urban area).

== Geography ==
The locality was mostly bounded to the north by the South-Western railway line which entered the locality from the north-east (Bungunya) and exited to the west (Daymar) and by the New South Wales border to the south.

There were two railway stations within South Talwood on the South-Western railway line:

- Gradule railway station (28.5399°S 149.2128°E)
- Lalaguli railway station, now abandoned (28.4498°S 149.5784°E)

The land use was a mix of dry and irrigated cropping as well as grazing on native vegetation.

== History ==
Maraweka Provisional School opened on 16 July 1922 as half-time provisional school (meaning a single teacher was shared between the two schools) in conjunction with Noralvera Provisional School which opened on 24 July 1922. Both schools were closed by early 1926.

== Demographics ==
In the 2016 census, South Talwood had a population of 95 people.

In the 2021 census, South Talwood had a population of 101 people.

== Education ==
At the time of the amalgamation, there were no schools in South Talwood. The nearest government primary schools were Talwood State School in neighbouring North Talwood to the north and Thallon State School in Thallon to the west. The nearest government secondary schools were some distance away: St George State High School in St George to the north-west and Goondiwindi State High School in Goondiwindi to the east. Distance education and boarding schools were the alternatives.
