= North Talwood, Queensland =

North Talwood
- Suburb
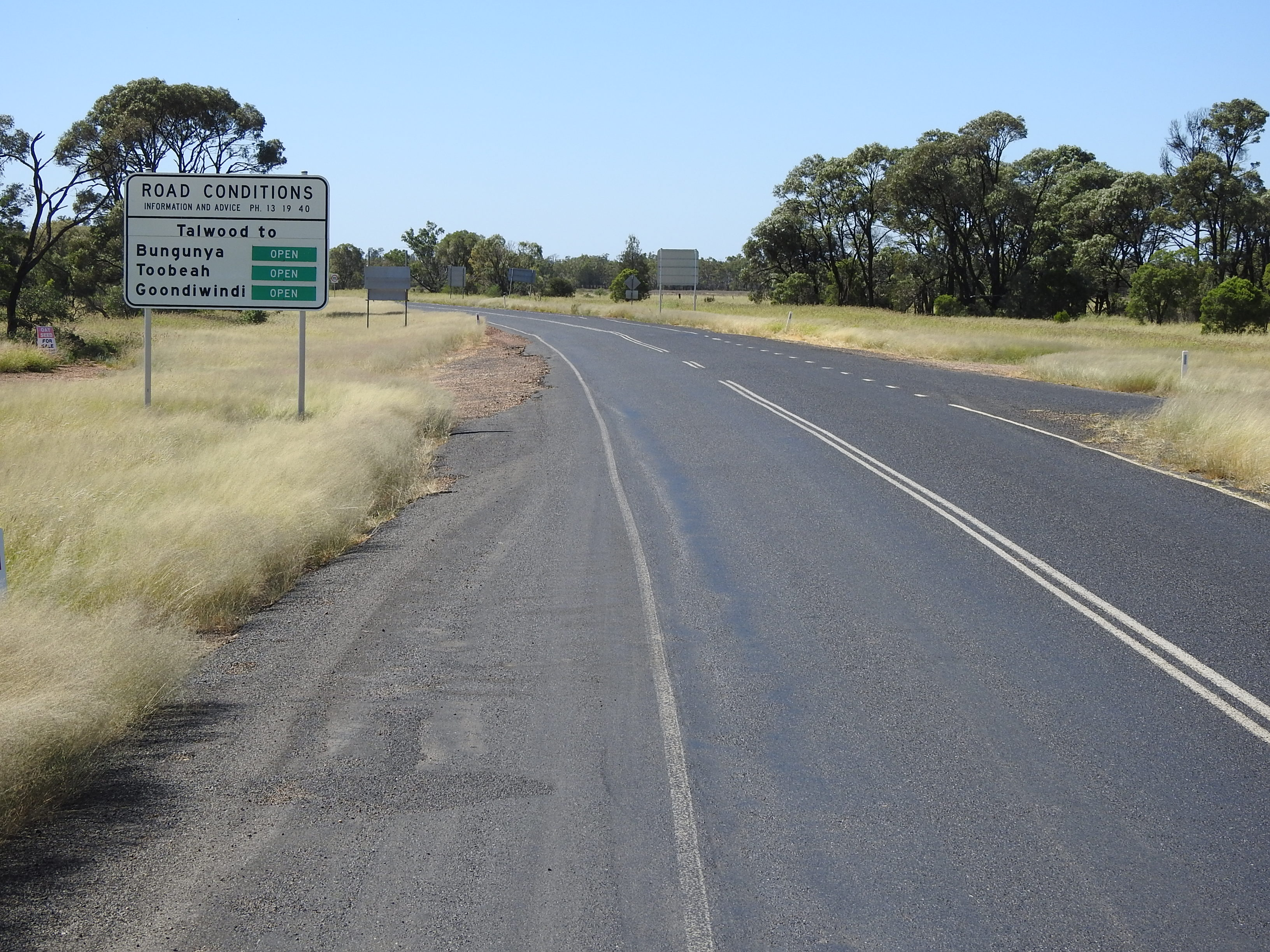
- Road conditions sign, Talwood

- Coordinates: 28.4125°S 149.3894°E
- Country: Australia
- State: Queensland
- LGA: Goondiwindi Region
- Location: 105 km (65 mi) W of Goondiwindi; 108 km (67 mi) SE of St George; 323 km (201 mi) WSW of Toowoomba; 455 km (283 mi) WSW of Brisbane

Government
  - State electorates: Southern Downs; Warrego
  - Federal division: Maranoa

Area
  - Total: 925.4 km^{2} (357.3 sq mi)

Population
  - Total: 113 (2021 census)
  - Density: 0.1221/km^{2} (0.3163/sq mi)
- Time zone: UTC+10:00 (AEST)
- Postcode: 4496
Suburbs around North Talwood
Weengallon	St George	North Bungunya
Weengallon	North Talwood	Bungunya
Weengallon	South Talwood	South Talwood

North Talwood was a rural locality in the Goondiwindi Region, Queensland, Australia. In the 2021 census, North Talwood had a population of 113 people.

On 17 May 2024, the Queensland Government decided to amalgamate the localities of North Talwood and South Talwood into a single locality called Talwood (with the town of Talwood as its main urban area).

== Geography ==
The town of Talwood (28.4852°S 149.4680°E) was on the southern edge of the locality of North Talwood immediately north of the boundary with South Talwood.

North Talwood was mostly bounded to the south by the South-Western railway line, which entered the locality from the south-east (South Talwood / Bungunya) and exited to the south-west (South Talwood / Weengallon). The locality was served by Talwood railway station in the town (28.4846°S 149.4683°E).

The Barwon Highway entered the locality in the south-east (Bungunya), passed through the town, and exited to the west (Weengallon).

== History ==
The name Talwood comes from the town, which was named from the Dalwood run name, which in turn was named in 1844, probably a corruption of an Aboriginal language word. Historically it is sometimes written as Tallwood.

== Demographics ==
In the 2016 census, North Talwood had a population of 169 people.

In the 2021 census, North Talwood had a population of 113 people.

== Education ==
Talwood State School is a government primary (Prep-6) school for boys and girls at 17 Recreation Street, then in North Talwood (28.4866°S 149.4703°E). In 2018, the school had an enrolment of 28 students with 4 teachers (3 full-time equivalent) and 5 non-teaching staff (2 full-time equivalent).

The nearest government secondary school for North Talwood was Goondiwindi State High School in Goondiwindi to the east.
