= Talwood, Queensland =

Talwood
- Town
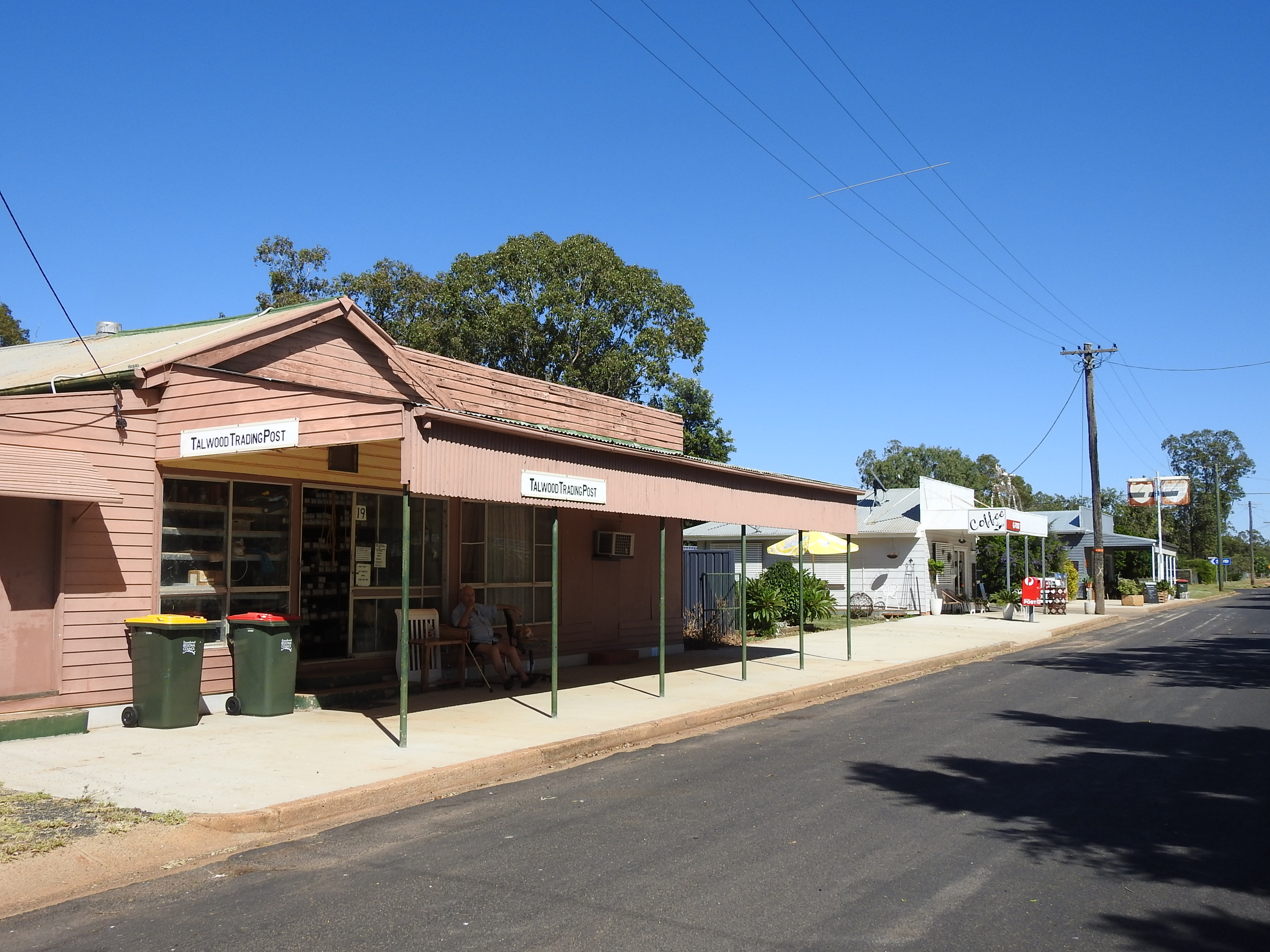
- Shops along southern side of Main Street

- Interactive map of Talwood
- Coordinates: 28.48528°S 149.46806°E
- Country: Australia
- State: Queensland
- LGA: Goondiwindi Region
- Location: 89.4 km (55.6 mi) W of Goondiwindi; 112 km (70 mi) SE of St George; 307 km (191 mi) WSW of Toowoomba; 438 km (272 mi) WSW of Brisbane

Government
  - State electorate: Southern Downs
  - Federal division: Maranoa

Area
  - Total: 1,718.9 km^{2} (663.7 sq mi)
- Postcode: 4496
Localities around Talwood
Weengallon	St George	North Bungunya
Daymar	Talwood	Bungunya
Mundingi (QLD)	Mungindi (NSW)	Boomi (NSW)

Talwood is a rural town and locality in Goondiwindi Region, Queensland, Australia. It is on the border of Queensland and New South Wales, separated by the Macintyre River.

On 17 May 2024, the Queensland Government decided to amalgamate the localities of North Talwood and South Talwood into a single locality called Talwood (with the already existing town of Talwood as its main urban area).

== Geography ==
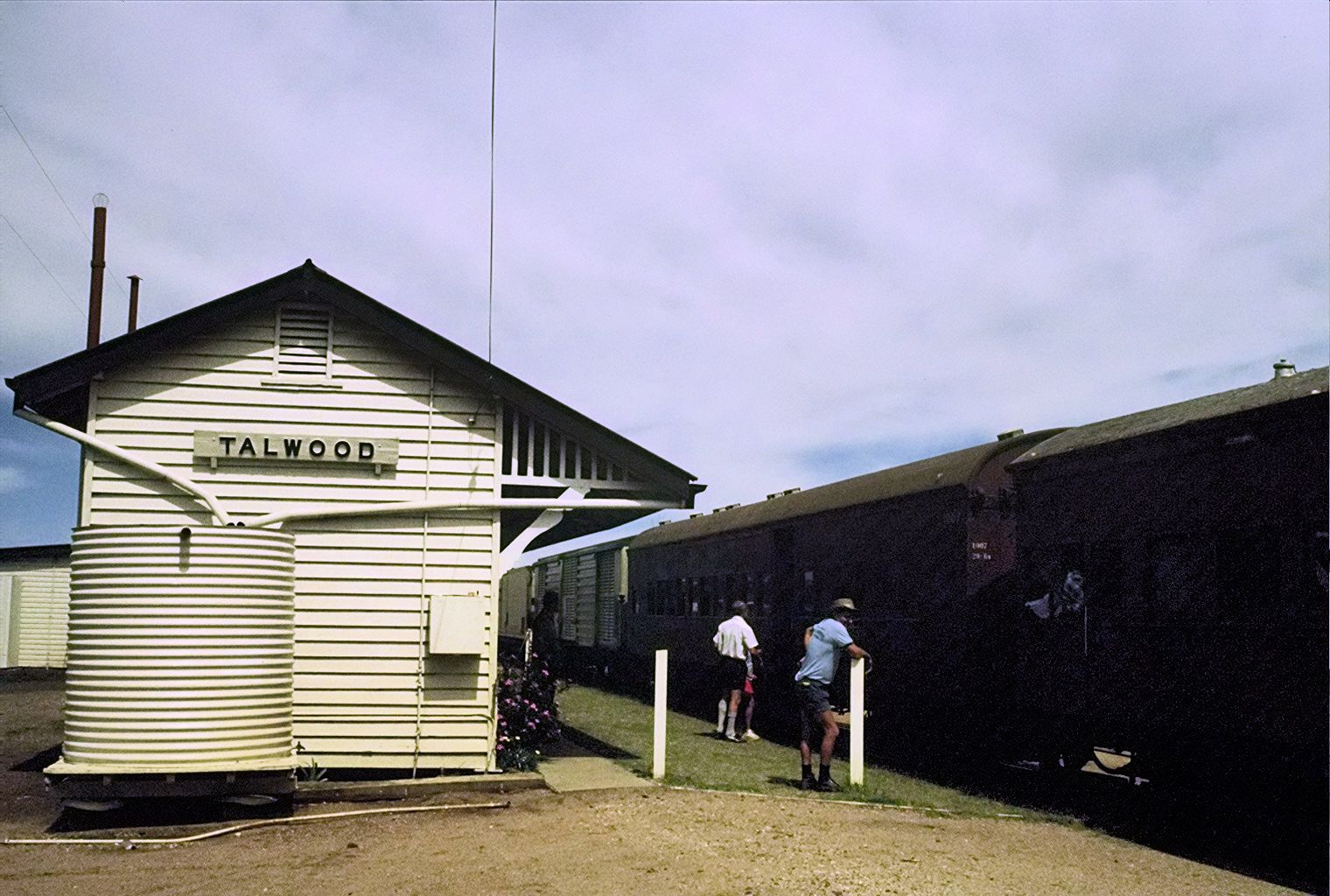
The Dirranbandi Mail arriving at Talwood railway station, 1987

The town lies in the south-east of the locality. Prior to the 2024 amalgamation, the town of Talwood was at the southern edge of the locality of North Talwood, immediately north of the boundary of South Talwood.

The Macintyre River forms the southern boundary of the locality, separating Queensland from New South Wales.

The Barwon Highway enters the locality from the east (Bungunya), passes just north of the town, and exits to the north-west (Weengallon).

The South-Western railway line also enters the locality from the east (Bungunya) just south of the highway. The town is served by Talwood railway station (28.4846°S 149.4683°E) on the northern edge of the town. The railway line exits to the west (Weengallon / Daymar). There are three other railway stops on the line within the locality (from west to east):

- Gradule railway station in the south-west of the locality (28.5400°S 149.2128°E)
- Talwood Wheat railway siding immediately west of the town (28.48561°S 149.45764°E)
- Lalaguli railway station, now abandoned, in the east of the locality (28.4498°S 149.5785°E)

== History ==
Gamilaraay (Gamilaroi, Kamilaroi, Comilroy) is a language from South-West Queensland and North-West New South Wales. The Gamilaraay language region includes the landscape within the local government boundaries of the Balonne Shire Council, including the towns of Dirranbandi, Thallon, Talwood and Bungunya as well as the border towns of Mungindi and Boomi extending to Moree, Tamworth and Coonabarabran in New South Wales.

The town's name is believed to be a corruption of Dalwood, a pastoral run name used from 1844, which was believed to be derived from an Aboriginal word. In 1903, it was spelled Tallwood on a survey plan with an annotation that it has been altered to Talwood, a name which was shown on a 1911 survey plan.

Tallwood Provisional School opened in 1911, but closed in the same year. Talwood State School opened on 4 November 1918. A new state school was built and opened in June 1945.

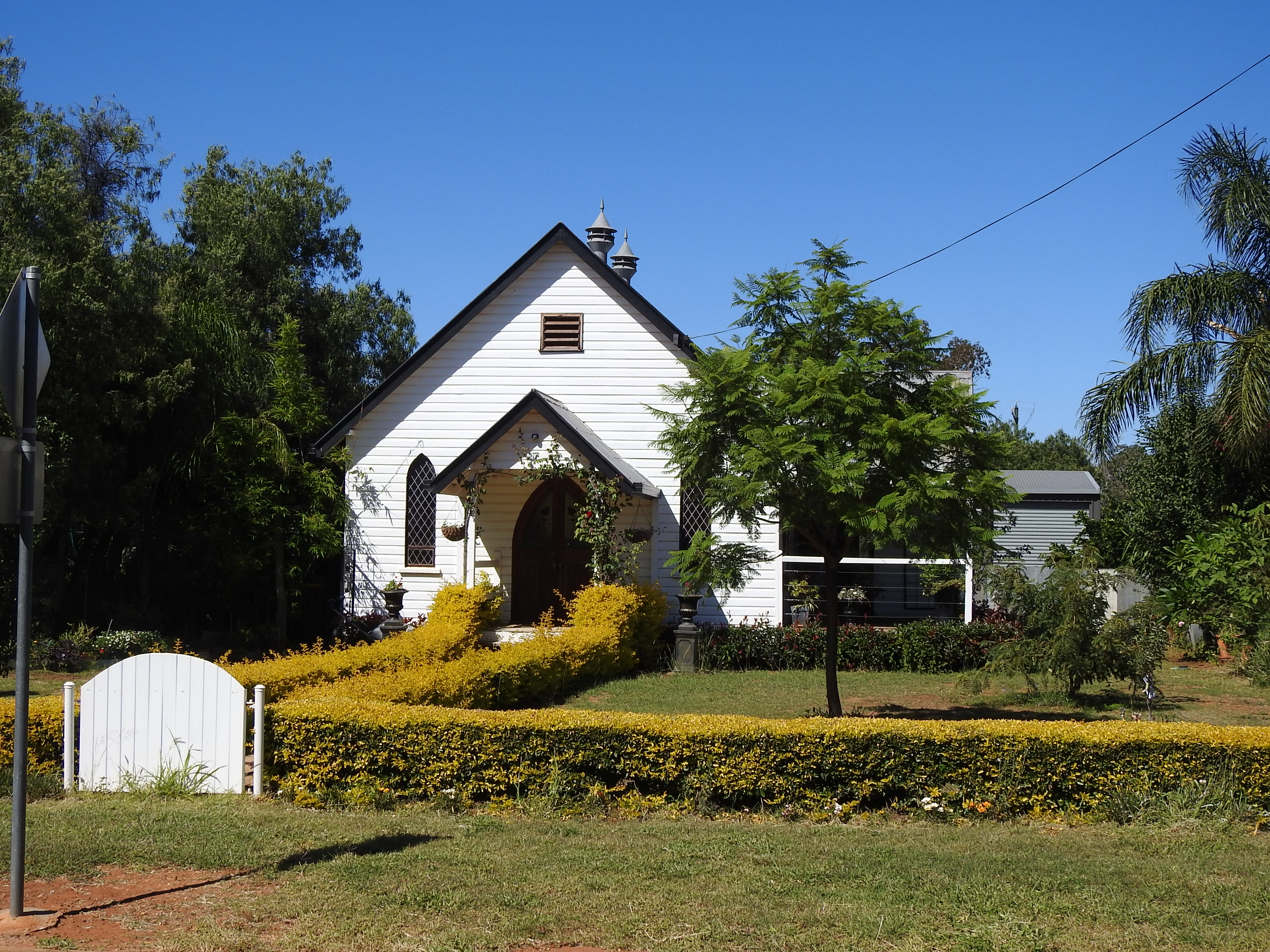
Former Presbyterian/Uniting Church, 2021

Talwood Presbyterian Church was opened at 7 Main Street (28.485113°S 149.4712°E) on 21 December 1947. It was built from timber. Following the amalgamation that created the Uniting Church in Australia in 1977, it became Talwood Uniting Church. It closed circa 1990 and is now used as a house.

The Talwood branch of the Queensland Country Women's Association opened in 1949.

St Paul's Anglican Church was built in 1956. It was built to be a memorial for those who served in World War II. The brick church was designed by Edwin Hayes in the Modernist style to seat 80 people.

St Joseph's Catholic Church was built from timber in 1955 at 14 Recreation Street (28.486046°S 149.4707°E). It is now closed, but, as at 2024, the church building is still extant.

On 17 May 2024, the Queensland Government decided to amalgamate the localities of North Talwood and South Talwood into a single location called Talwood (with the town of Talwood as its main urban area).

== Education ==
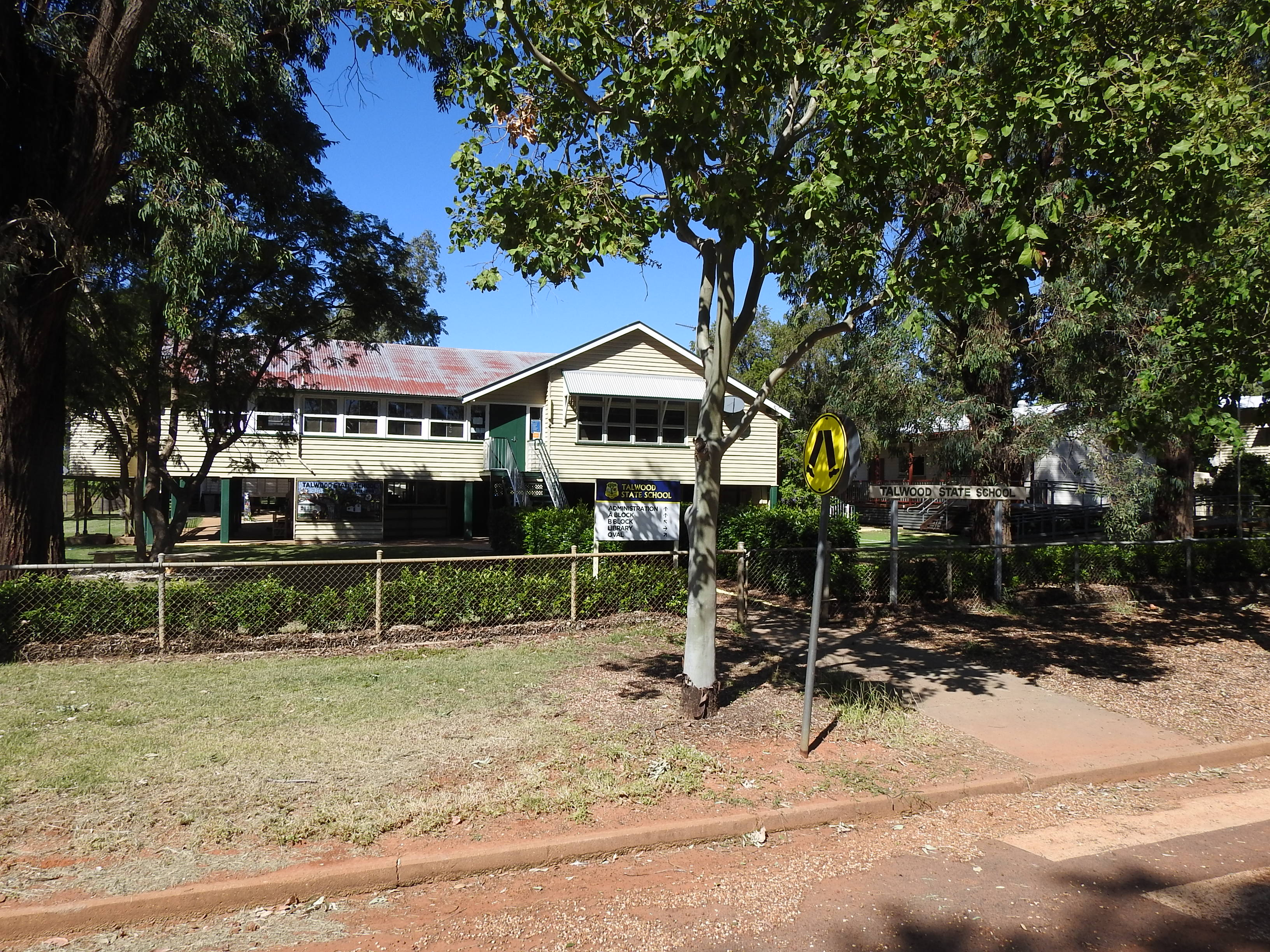
Talwood State School, 2021

Talwood State School is a government primary (Prep-6) school for boys and girls at 17 Recreation Street (28.4866°S 149.4703°E). In 2018, the school had an enrolment of 28 students with four teachers (three full-time equivalent) and five non-teaching staff (two full-time equivalent).

There are no secondary schools in Talwood. The nearest government secondary school is Goondiwindi State High School in Goondiwindi to the east, but due to the distance, other options would be distance education and boarding school.

== Amenities ==
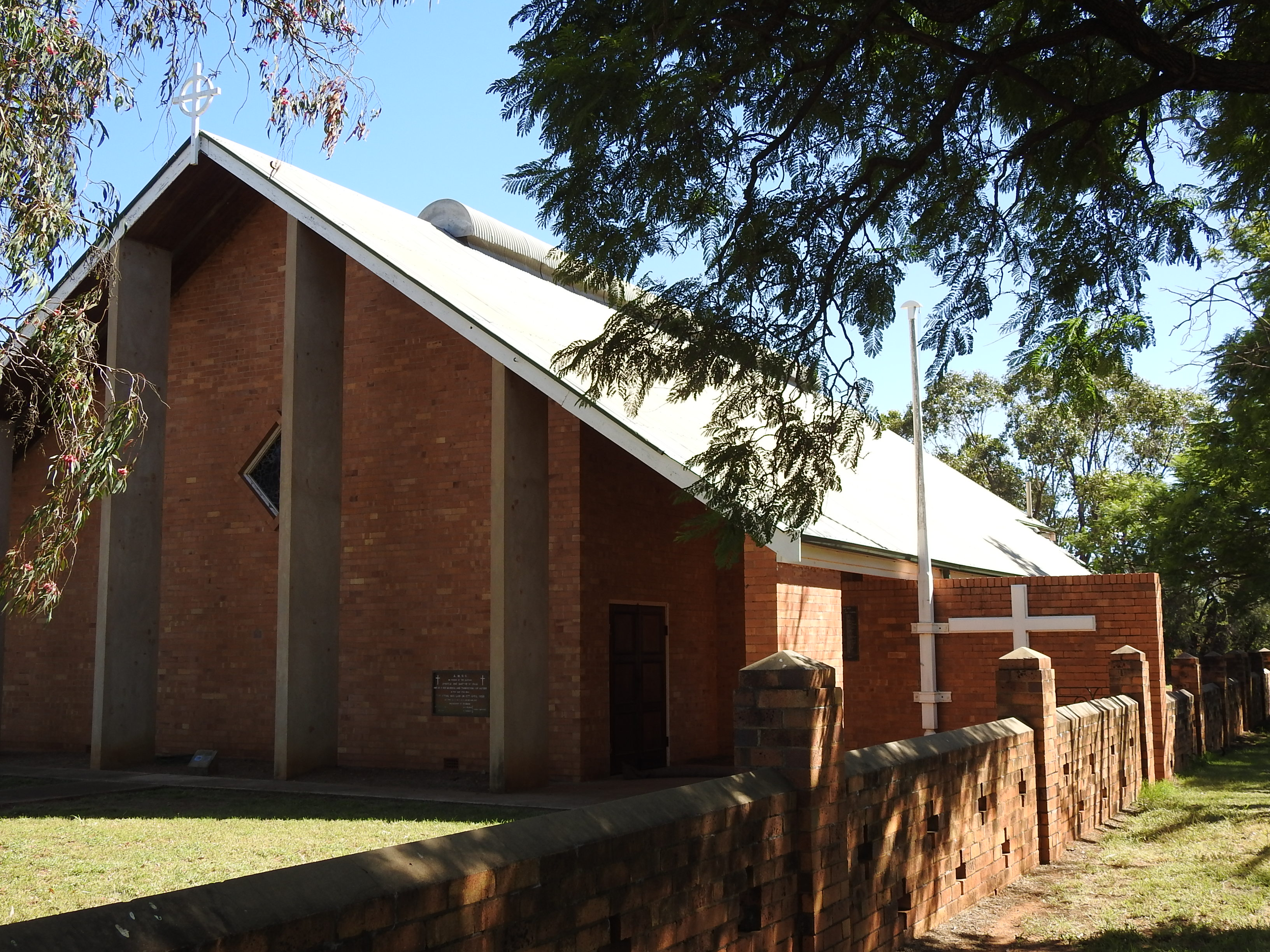
Saint Paul's Anglican Church, 2021

Talwood Post Office is at 25 Main Street (28.4854°S 149.4692°E).

St Paul's Anglican Church is at 2 Main Street (28.484544°S 149.4717°E). As at 2024, services are only held at the church "on request".

== Gallery ==
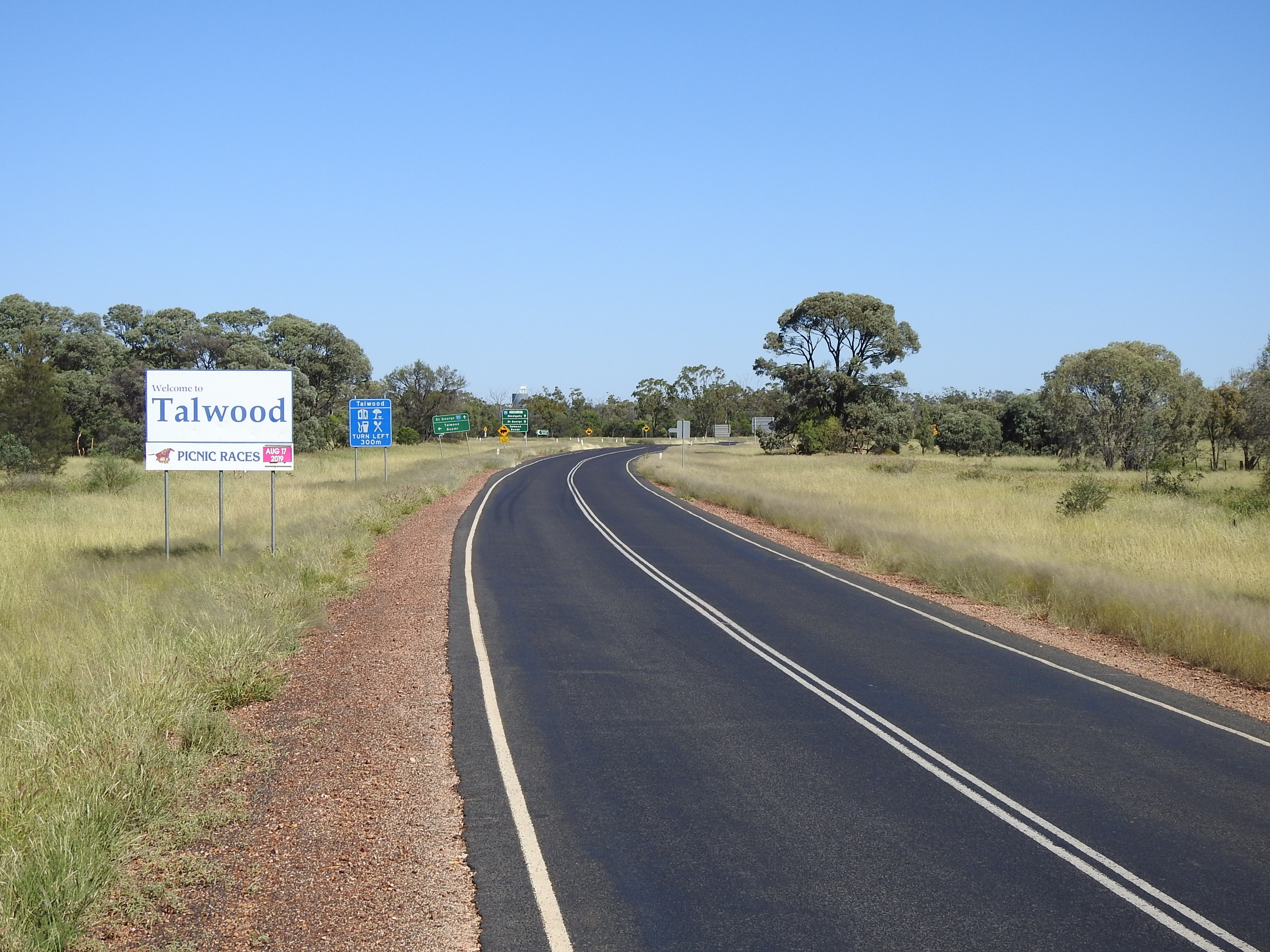
Eastern entrance to town (2021).

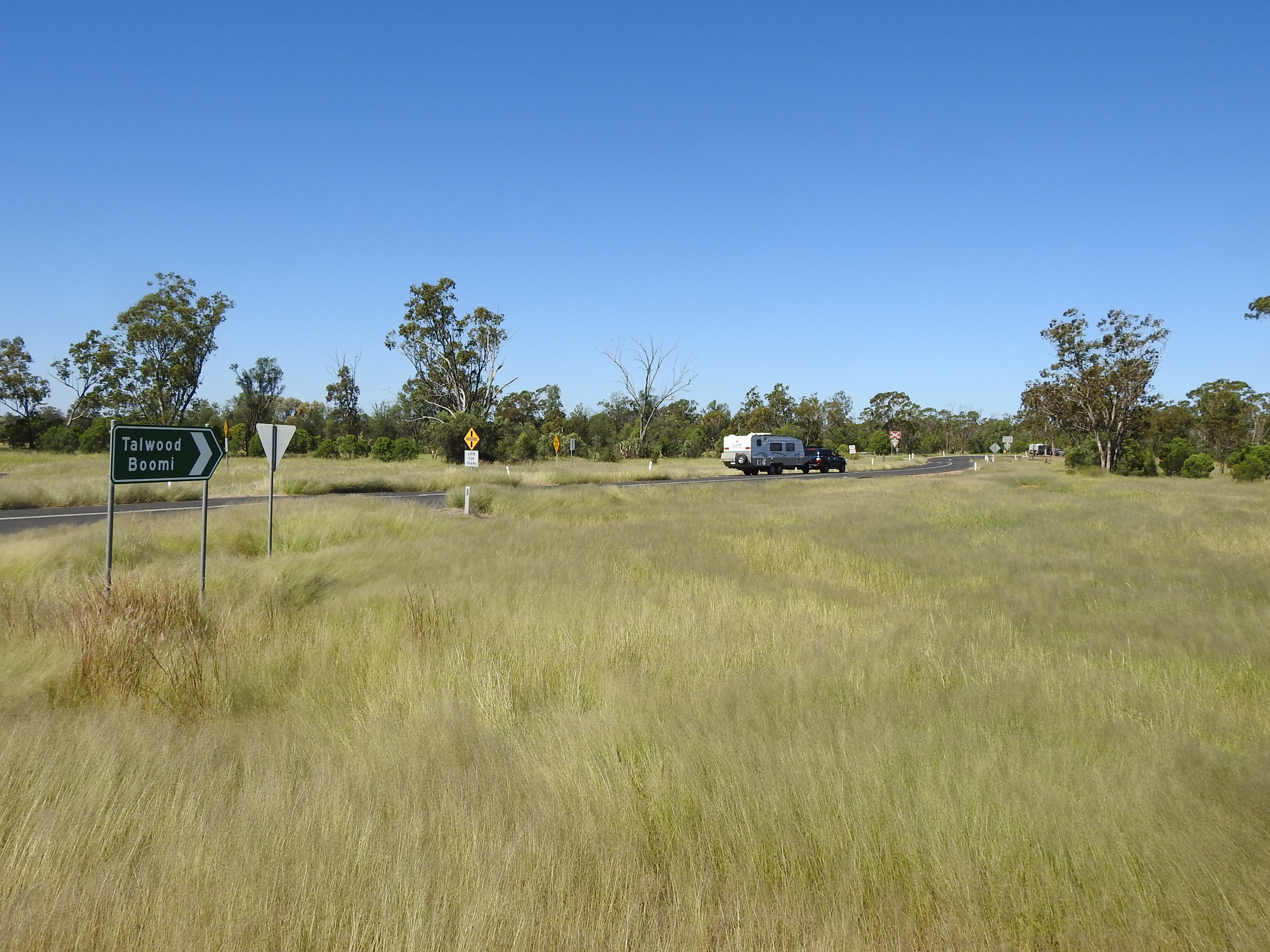
Barwon Highway turn-off to Talwood township (2021)

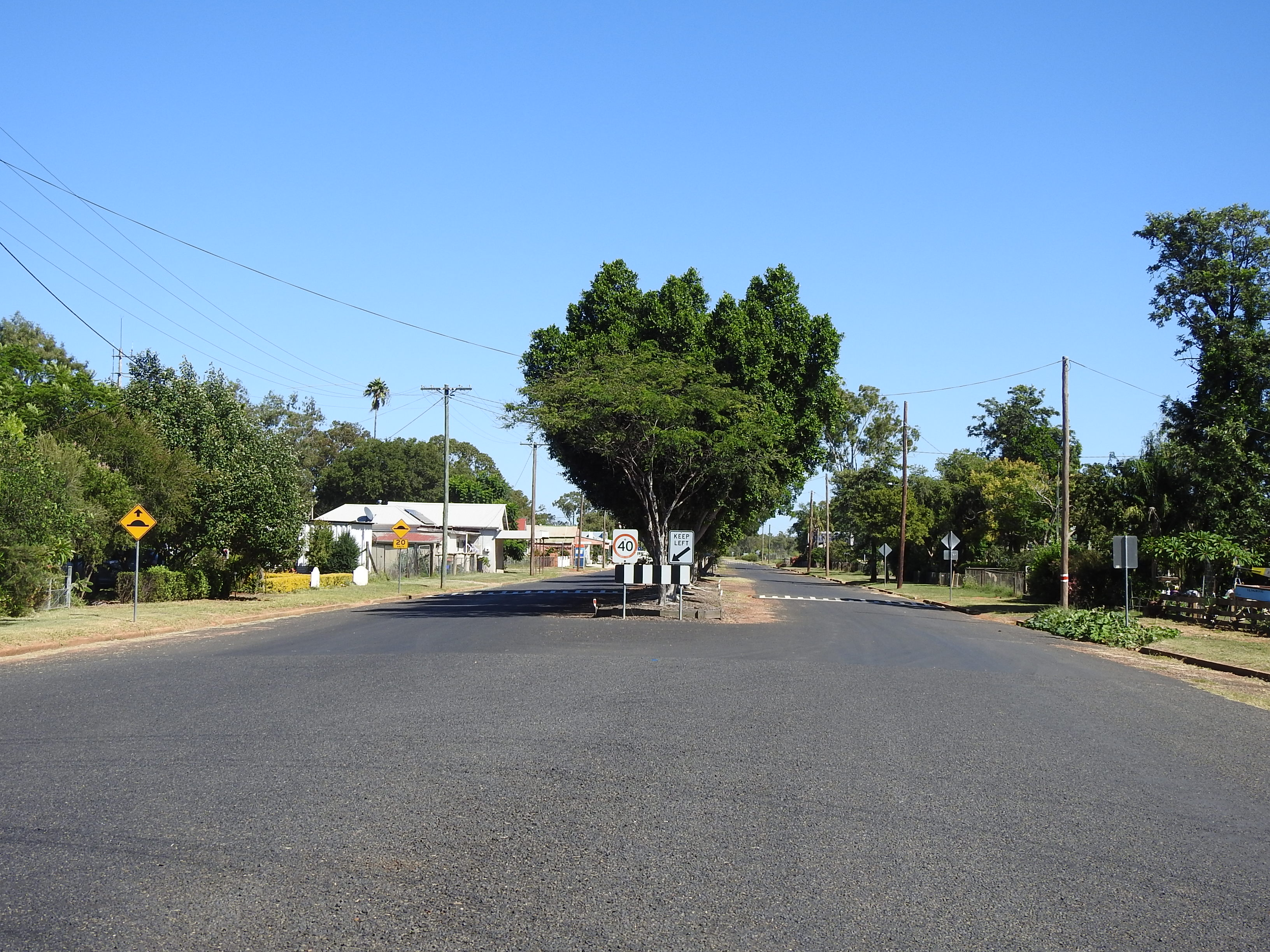
Looking west down Main Street (2021)

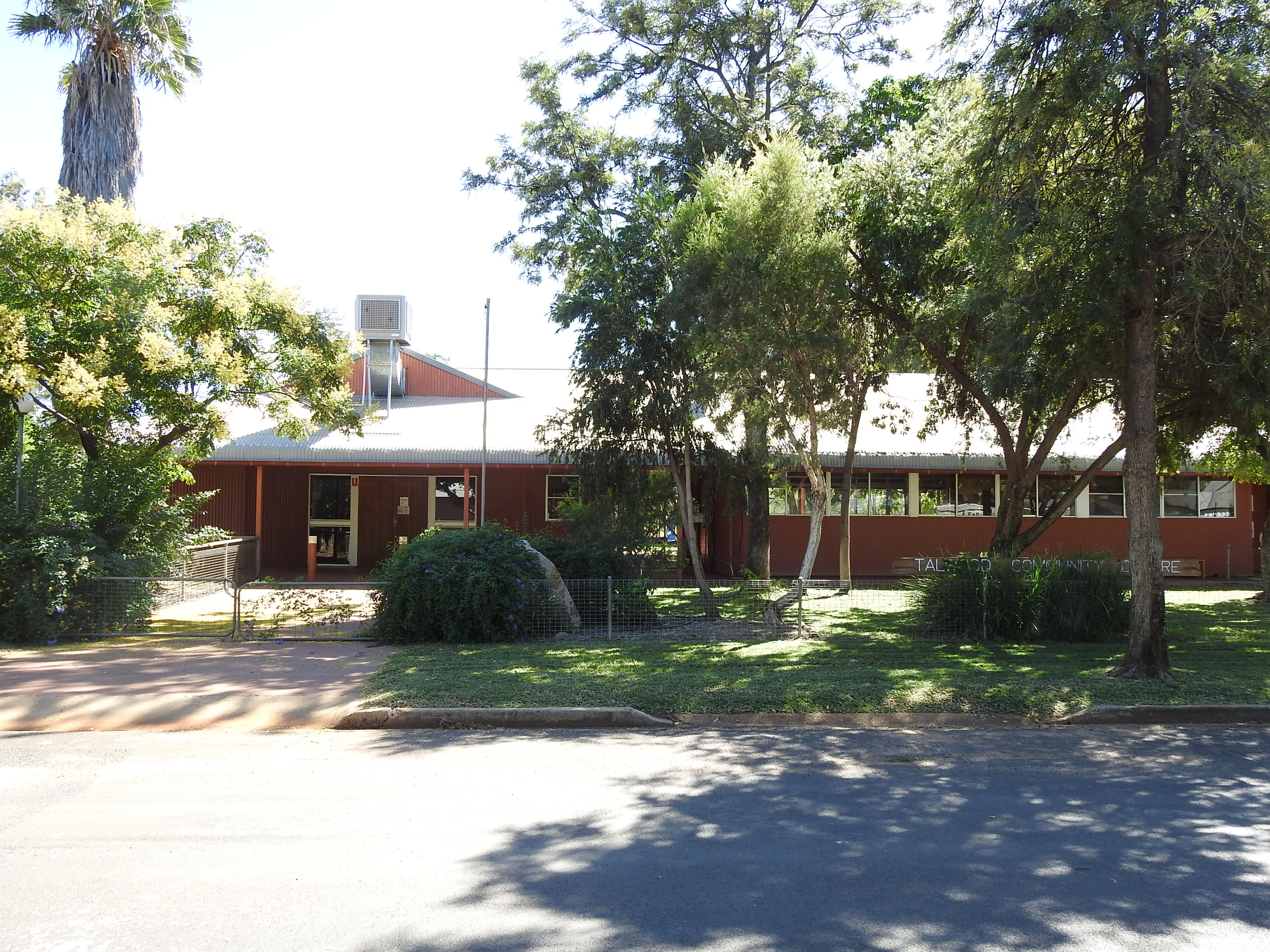
Talwood Community Centre, Main Street (2021)

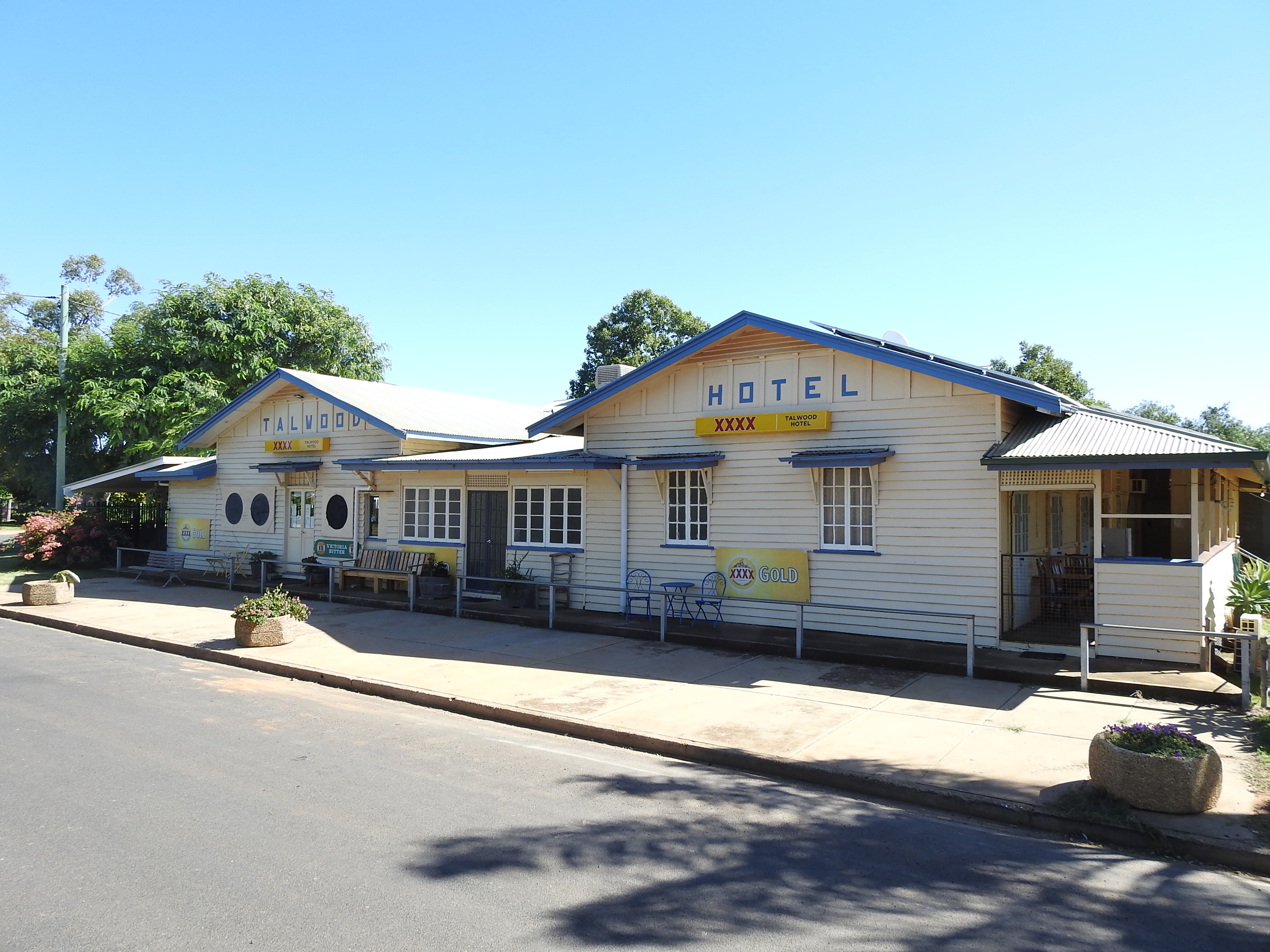
Talwood Hotel, Main Street (2021)

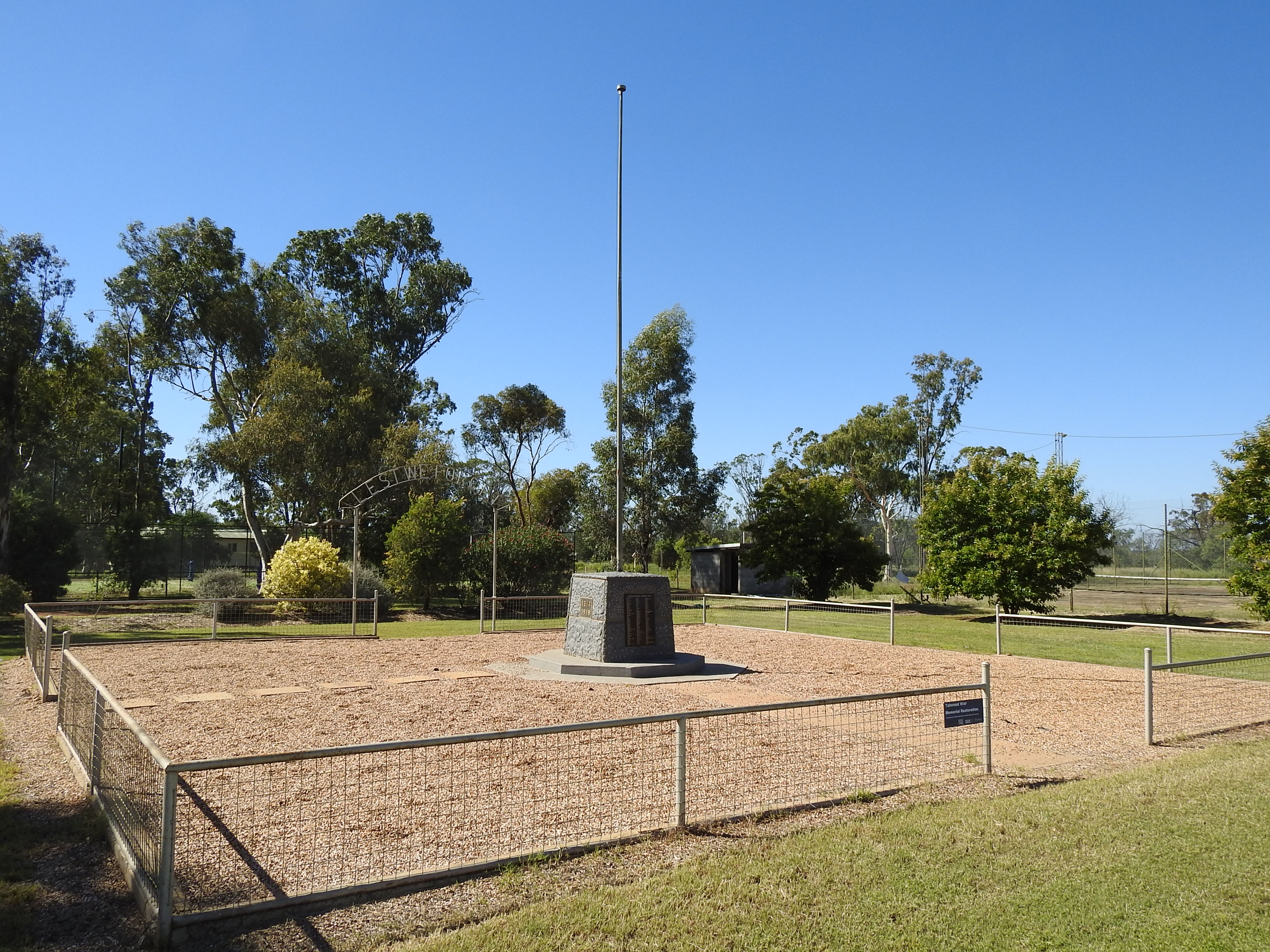
Talwood war memorial, park, Recreation Street (2021)

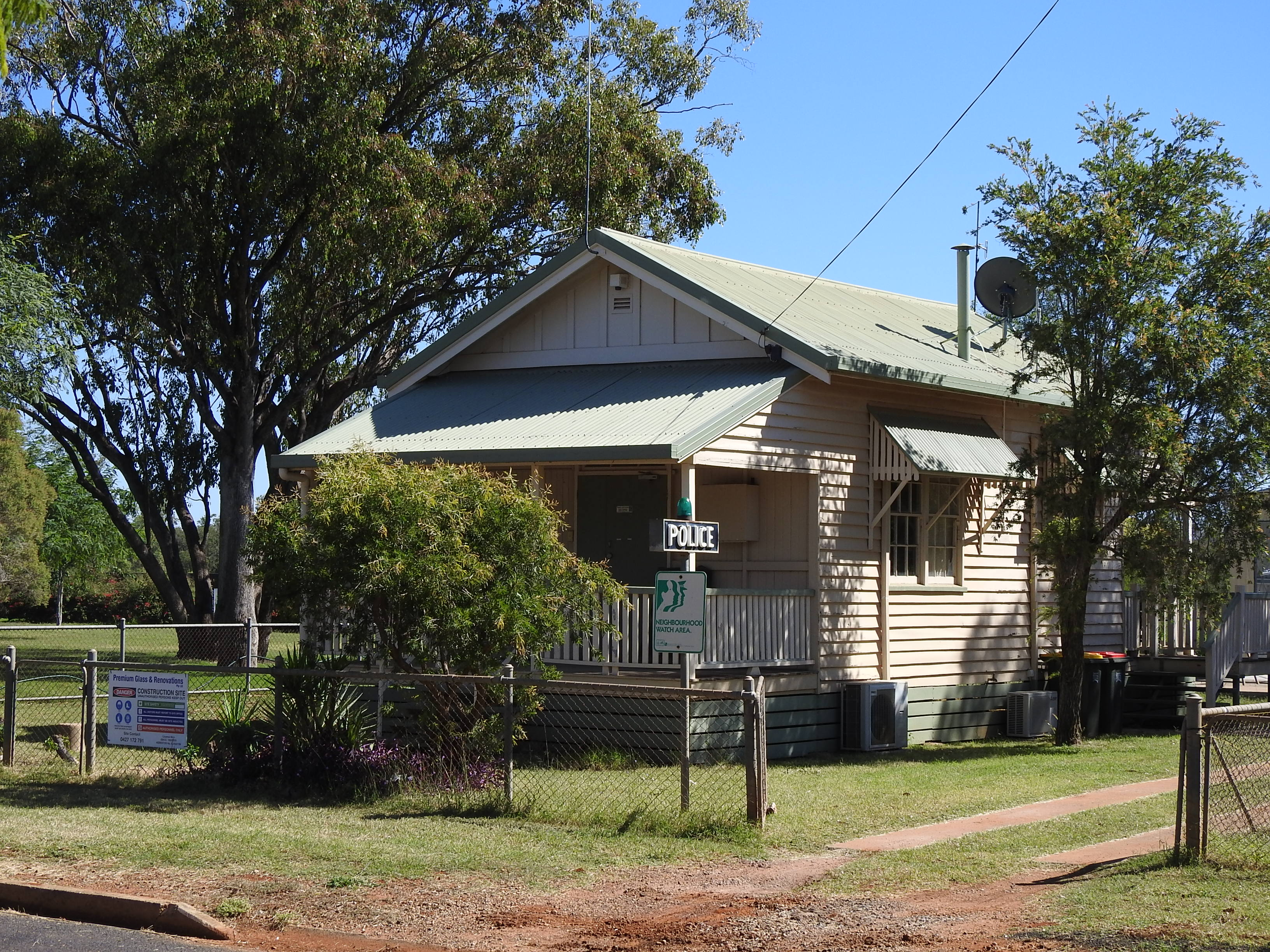
Talwood Police Station, Main Street (2021)

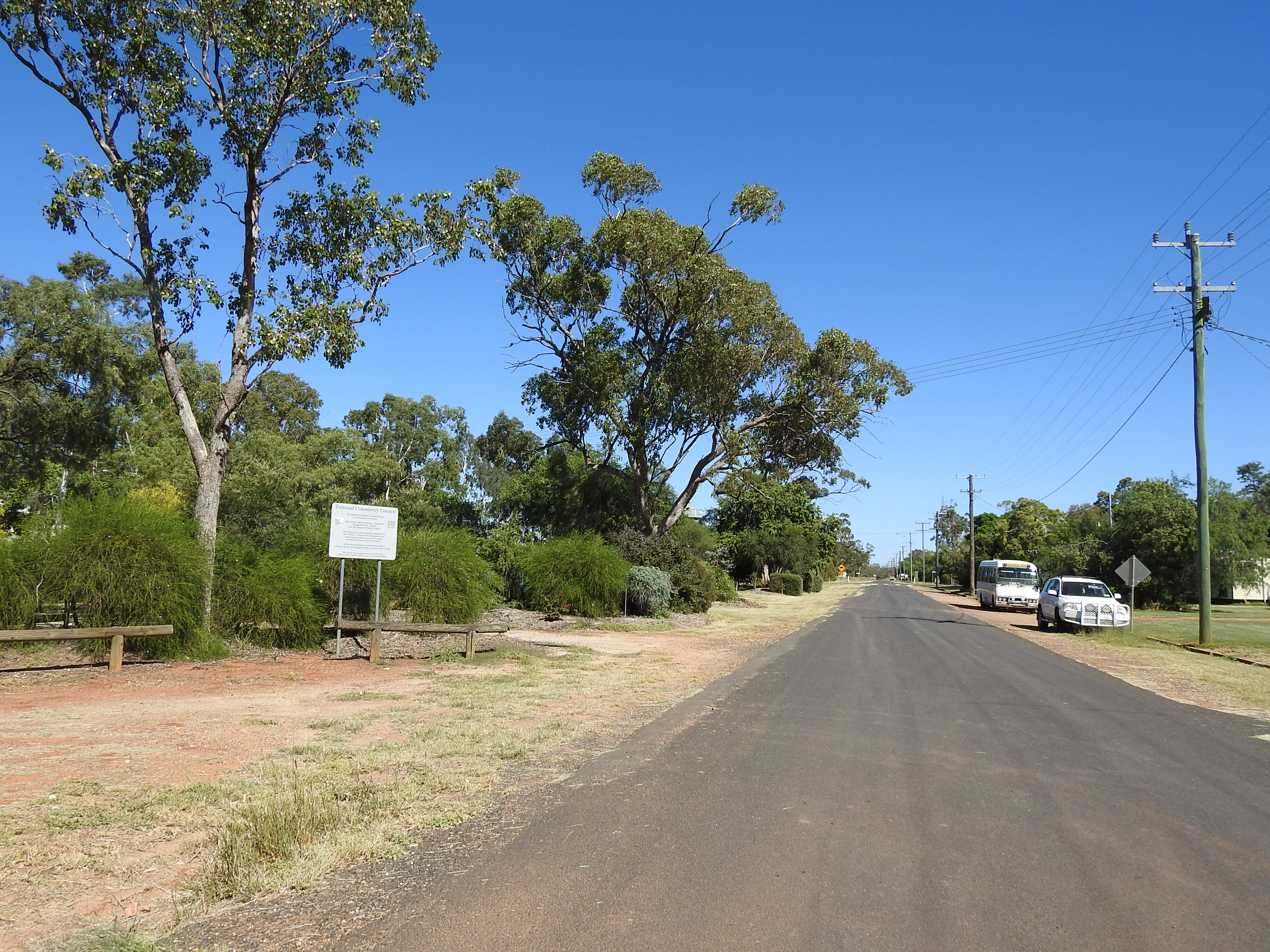
Talwood Community Garden, Recreation Street (2021)
