= Bungunya, Queensland =

Bungunya
- Town
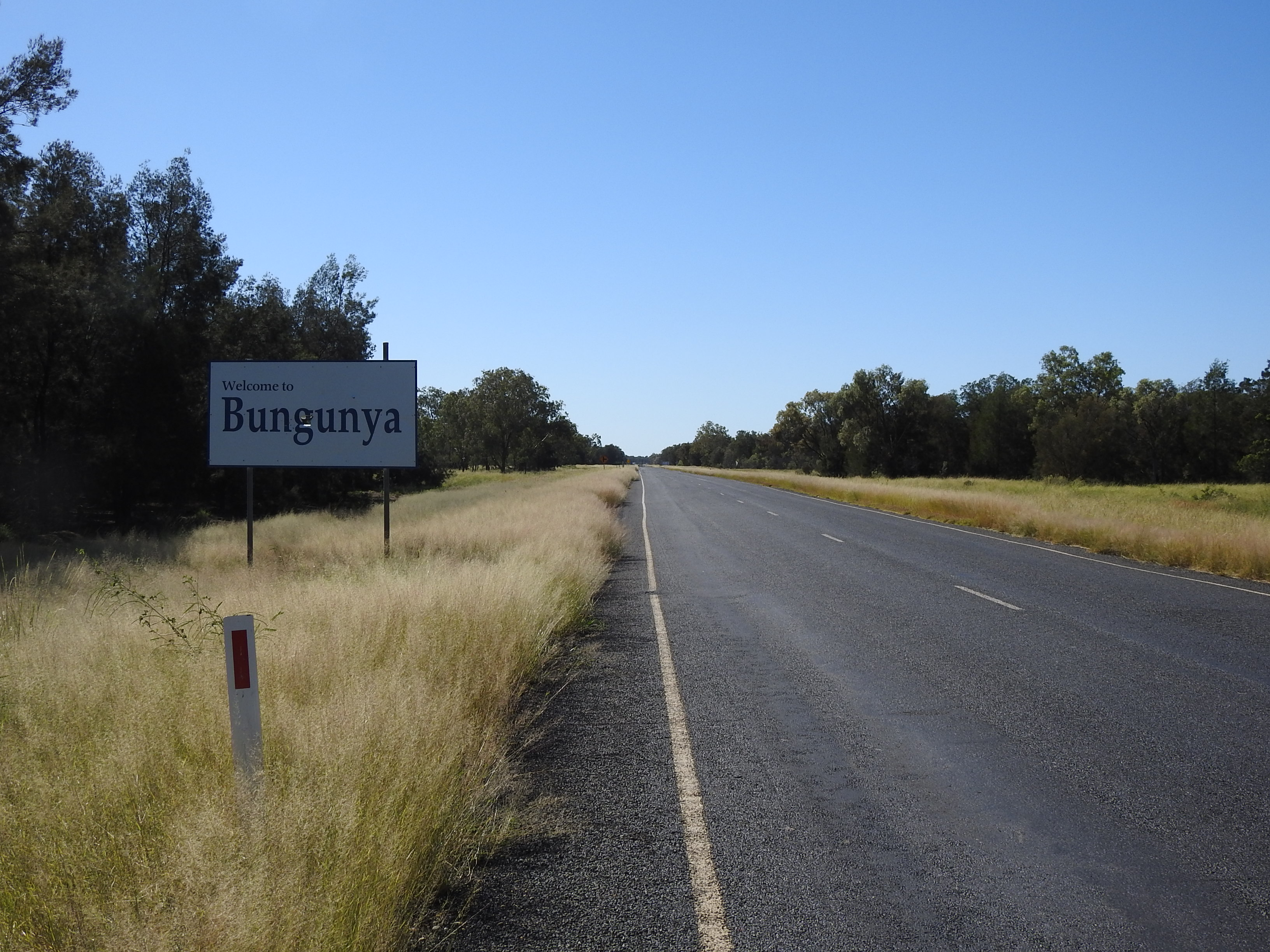
- Barwon Highway on the western approach to the locale (2021).

- Interactive map of Bungunya
- Coordinates: 28.4247°S 149.6569°E
- Country: Australia
- State: Queensland
- LGA: Goondiwindi Region
- Location: 69.6 km (43.2 mi) WNW of Goondiwindi; 131 km (81 mi) SW of St George; 288 km (179 mi) WSW of Toowoomba; 414 km (257 mi) WSW of Brisbane

Government
  - State electorate: Southern Downs
  - Federal division: Maranoa

Area
  - Total: 449.5 km^{2} (173.6 sq mi)

Population
  - Total: 62 (2021 census)
  - Density: 0.1379/km^{2} (0.3572/sq mi)
- Time zone: UTC+10:00 (AEST)
- Postcode: 4494
Localities around Bungunya
North Bungunya	Kioma	Toobeah
Talwood	Bungunya	Toobeah
Boomi (NSW)	Boomi (NSW)	Toobeah

Bungunya is a rural town and locality in the Goondiwindi Region, Queensland, Australia. The locality is on the border of Queensland and New South Wales. In the 2021 census, the locality of Bungunya had a population of 62 people.

== Geography ==
Bungunya is located immediately north of the Macintyre River, which is the border between Queensland and New South Wales. The Weir River flows from east to west through the northern part of the locality. Other creeks flow from east to west through other parts of the locality. All of these rivers and creeks ultimately flow into the Barwon River in New South Wales.

The town is located in the approximate centre of the locality. The Barwon Highway (from St George to Goondiwindi) passes from east to west through the middle of the locality, immediately to the north of the town. The Meandarra – Talwood Road (State Route 74) runs north from the Barwon Highway through the centre of the northern part of the locality. The South Western railway line (from Warwick to Dirranbandi) also passes from east to west through the locality, but to the immediate south of the town. The locality is served by the Bungunya railway station (28.4264°S 149.6575°E) in the town and was served by the now-abandoned Welltown railway station (28.4445°S 149.7325°E) in the east of the locality.

The land is very flat, approximately 180 metres above sea level, and is extensively developed for agriculture.

== History ==
The name Bungunya is allegedly an Aboriginal word, meaning a high or safe living place. The language and dialect is unknown but it may be an imported name from Victoria.

Gamilaraay (Gamilaroi, Kamilaroi, Comilroy) is a language from South-West Queensland and North-West New South Wales. The Gamilaraay language region includes the landscape within the local government boundaries of the Balonne Shire Council, including the towns of Dirranbandi, Thallon, Talwood and Bungunya as well as the border towns of Mungindi and Boomi extending to Moree, Tamworth and Coonabarabran in NSW.

Bungunya Provisional School opened on a half-time basis in 1916, sharing the teacher with Glengower Provisional School. It became a full-time school in 1918 and a state school soon after.

Bungunya was once a busy railway centre from which thousands of bales of wool were transported from local sheep stations following the shearing season.

== Demographics ==
In the 2011 census, the locality of Bungunya had a population of 189 people.

In the 2016 census, the locality of Bungunya had a population of 75 people.

In the 2021 census, the locality of Bungunya had a population of 62 people.

== Education ==
Bungunya State School is a government primary (Prep-6) school for boys and girls at George Street (28.4270°S 149.6545°E). In 2017, the school had an enrolment of 22 students with 3 teachers (2 full-time equivalent) and 6 non-teaching staff (2 full-time equivalent). In 2023, the school had an enrolment of 17 students. As at 2024, the school was open, but, as it had no students enrolled, it was not operational.

There are no secondary schools in Bungunya nor nearby. The options are distance education and boarding school.

== Gallery ==
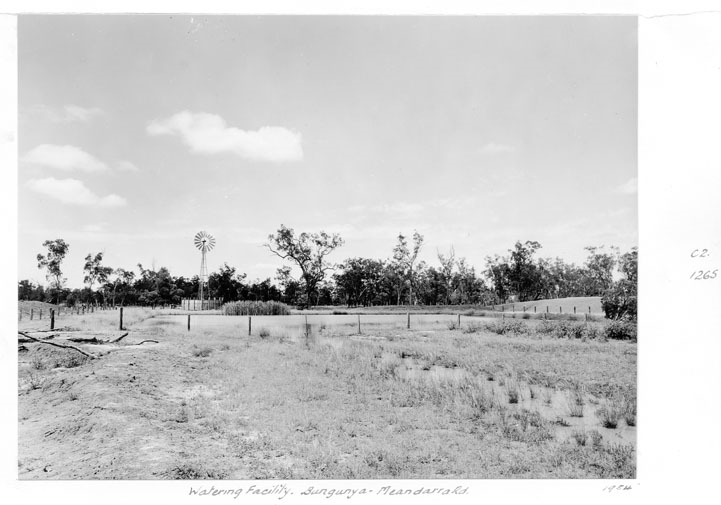
Watering facility, Meandarra Rd, Bungunya, circa 1954

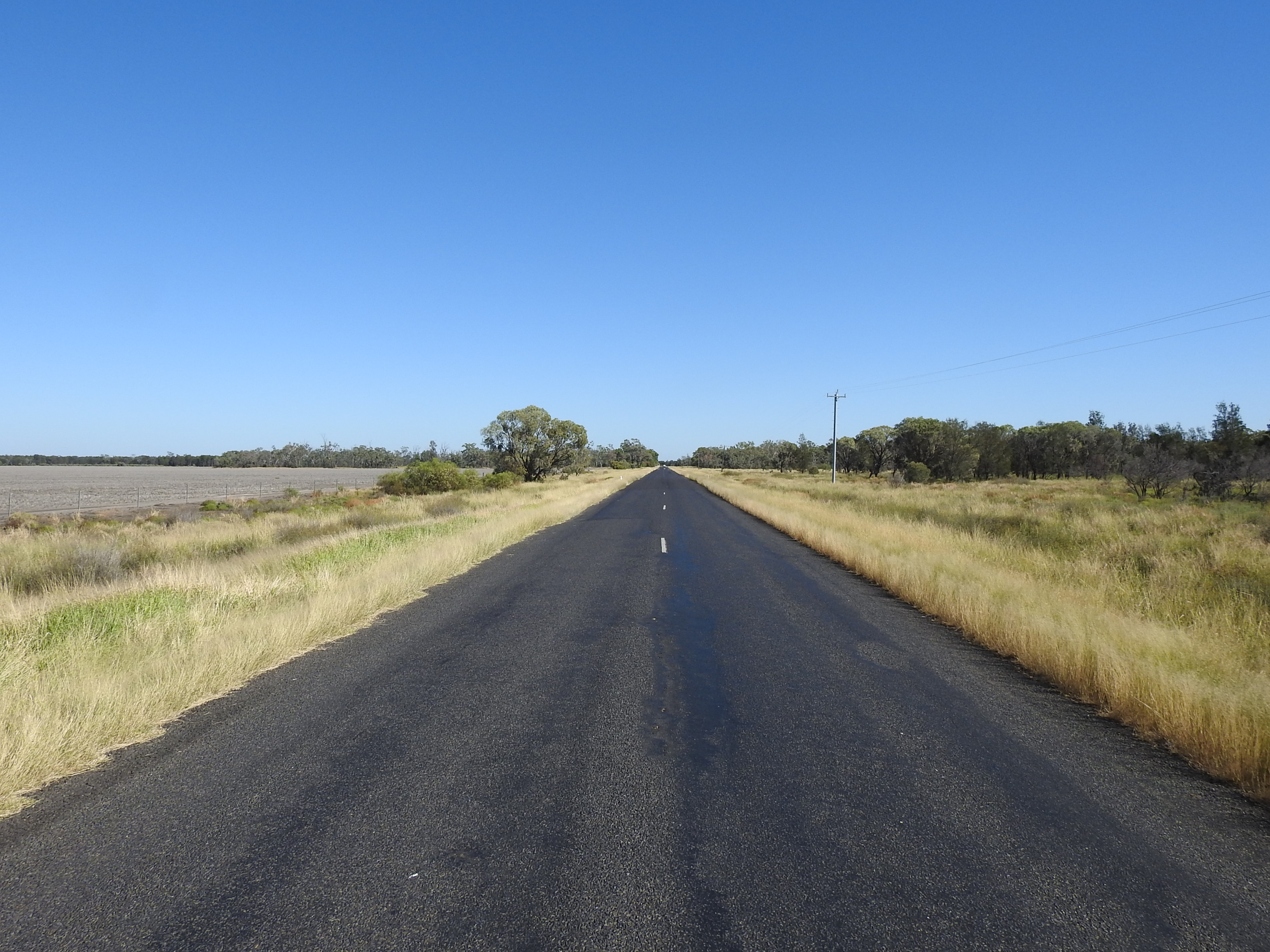
Barwon Highway westbound, east of Bungunya turn-off (2021).

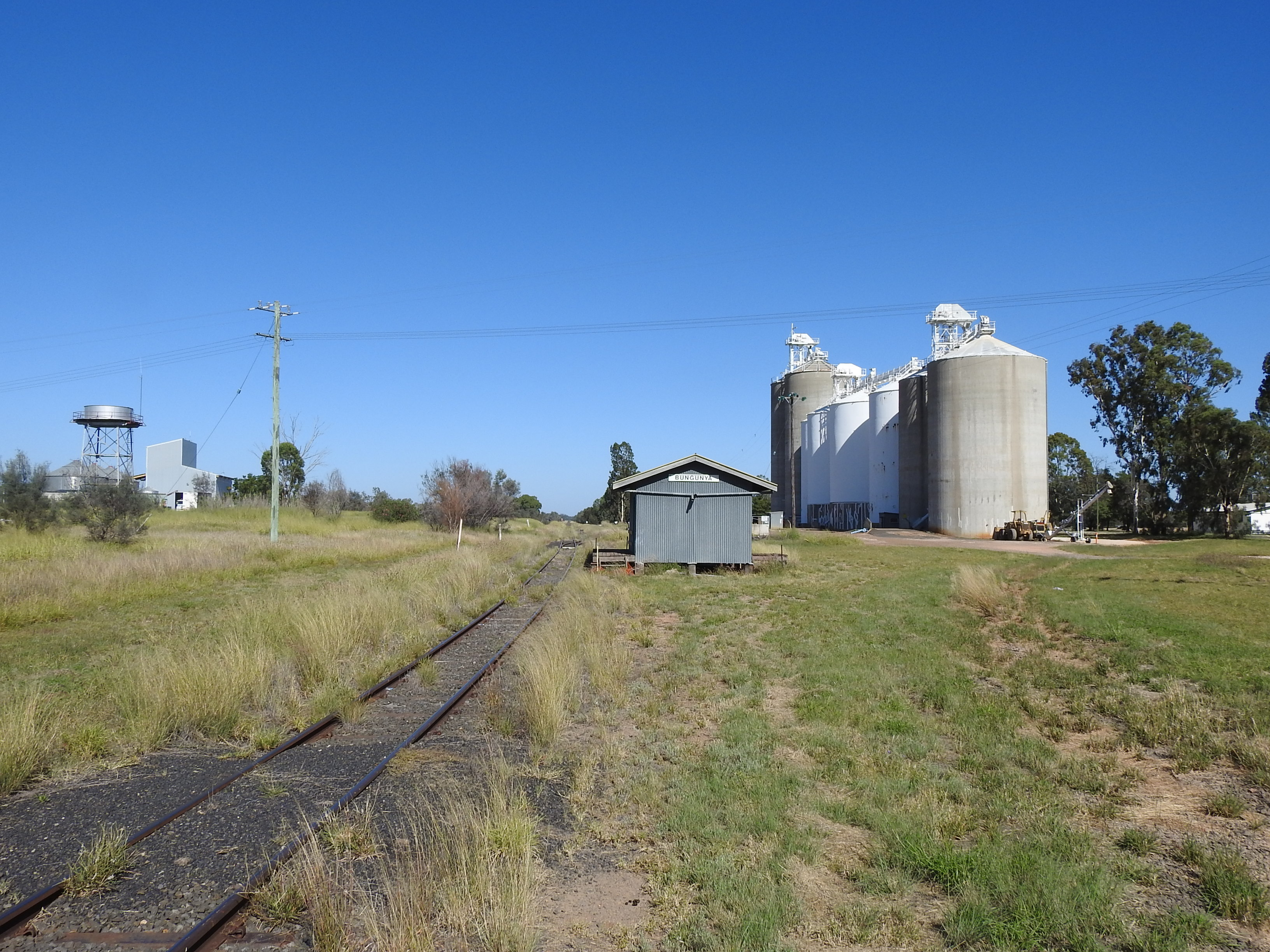
Railway siding and silos (2021).

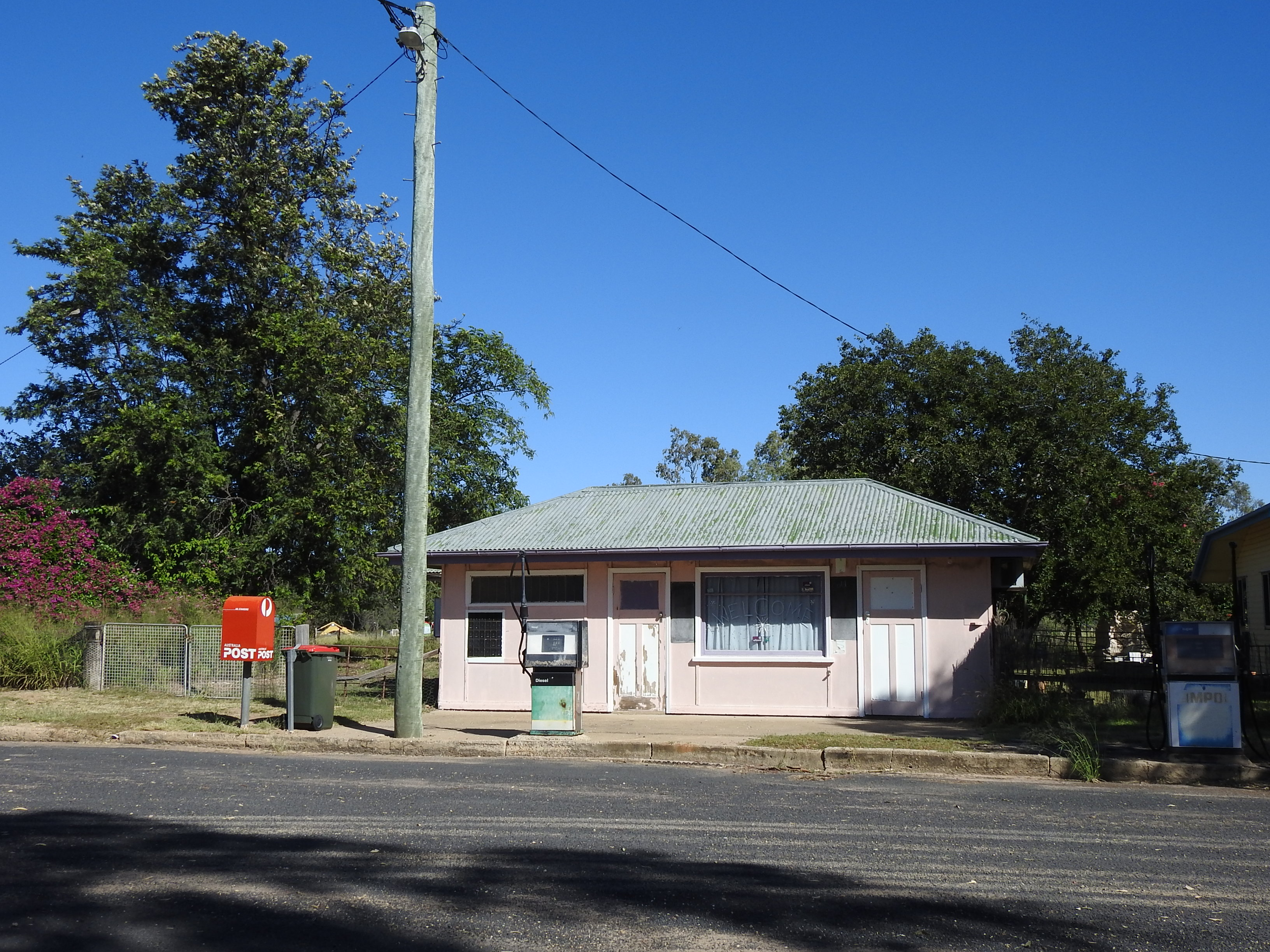
Post office building, Main Street (2021).
