= Daymar, Queensland =

Daymar
- Town
- Interactive map of Daymar
- Coordinates: 28.6061°S 148.9841°E
- Country: Australia
- State: Queensland
- LGA: Goondiwindi Region
- Location: 16.4 km (10.2 mi) E of Thallon; 80.6 km (50.1 mi) E of Dirranbandi; 93.1 km (57.8 mi) SSE of St George; 159 km (99 mi) W of Goondiwindi; 509 km (316 mi) WSW of Brisbane

Government
  - State electorate: Southern Downs
  - Federal division: Maranoa

Area
  - Total: 553.7 km^{2} (213.8 sq mi)

Population
  - Total: 41 (2021 census)
  - Density: 0.0740/km^{2} (0.1918/sq mi)
- Time zone: UTC+10:00 (AEST)
- Postcode: 4497
Localities around Daymar
Thallon	Weengallon	Weengallon
Thallon	Daymar	Talwood
Thallon	Thallon	Mungindi

Daymar is a rural town and locality in the Goondiwindi Region, Queensland, Australia. In the 2021 census, the locality of Daymar had a population of 41 people.

== Geography ==
The town is on the South Western railway line, with the town being served by the Daymar railway station (28.6035°S 148.9849°E).

The land use is a mix of crops and grazing on native vegetation.

== History ==
The town takes its name from the railway station, which in turn was named by Queensland Railways Department on 15 September 1911, and is thought to be an Aboriginal word, meaning red ridge.

Daymar Provisional School opened on 11 March 1946, becoming Daymar State School in 1952. In 1977-1978 the closed Kurumbul State School's building was relocated from Kurumbul to Daymar State School.

It closed on 9 December 1983. It was in Waugh Street opposite the railway station (28.6049°S 148.9838°E).

== Demographics ==
In the 2016 census, the locality of Daymar had a population of 37 people.

In the 2021 census, the locality of Daymar had a population of 41 people.

== Amenities ==
The Thallon-Daymar branch of the Queensland Country Women's Association has its rooms at 47 William Street in neighbouring Thallon in the Shire of Balonne, 12 kilometres (7.5 mi) to the west of Daymar.

Our Lady of Lourdes Catholic Church is in Waugh Street (28.6047°S 148.9844°E).

In the 2016 census, the locality of Daymar had a population of 37 people.

== Education ==
There are no schools in Daymar. The nearest government primary school is Thallon State School in neighbouring Thallon to the west. The nearest government secondary schools are Dirranbandi State School (to Year 10) in Dirranbandi to the west and St George State High School (to Year 12) in St George to the north-west. Given the distances to these secondary schools, distance education and boarding school would be other options.
