= Barwon Highway =

Highway in Queensland, Australia

Barwon Highway Queensland
- Barwon Highway (green on black)

General information
- Type: Highway
- Length: 154.9 km (96 mi)
- Route number(s): State Route 85

Major junctions
- West end: Carnarvon Highway (National Route 46), 37km south of St George
- East end: Leichhardt Highway (National Highway A39 / State Route 85); Newell Highway (A39); Cunningham Highway (National Route 42), Goondiwindi; NSW/Qld Border

Location(s)
- Major settlements: Talwood, Bungunya

Highway system
- Highways in Australia; National Highway • Freeways in Australia; Highways in Queensland

The Barwon Highway is one of the shorter state highways of Queensland, Australia, connecting the Goondiwindi Region and the Shire of Balonne. It starts at the Carnarvon Highway in Nindigully, 44 kilometres south of St George, and travels east for about 155 kilometres until it reaches Goondiwindi, where it terminates at the Leichhardt Highway.

The highway travels north of and roughly parallel to the Barwon River, after which it is named. The river forms part of the border between Queensland and New South Wales.

== State route 85 ==
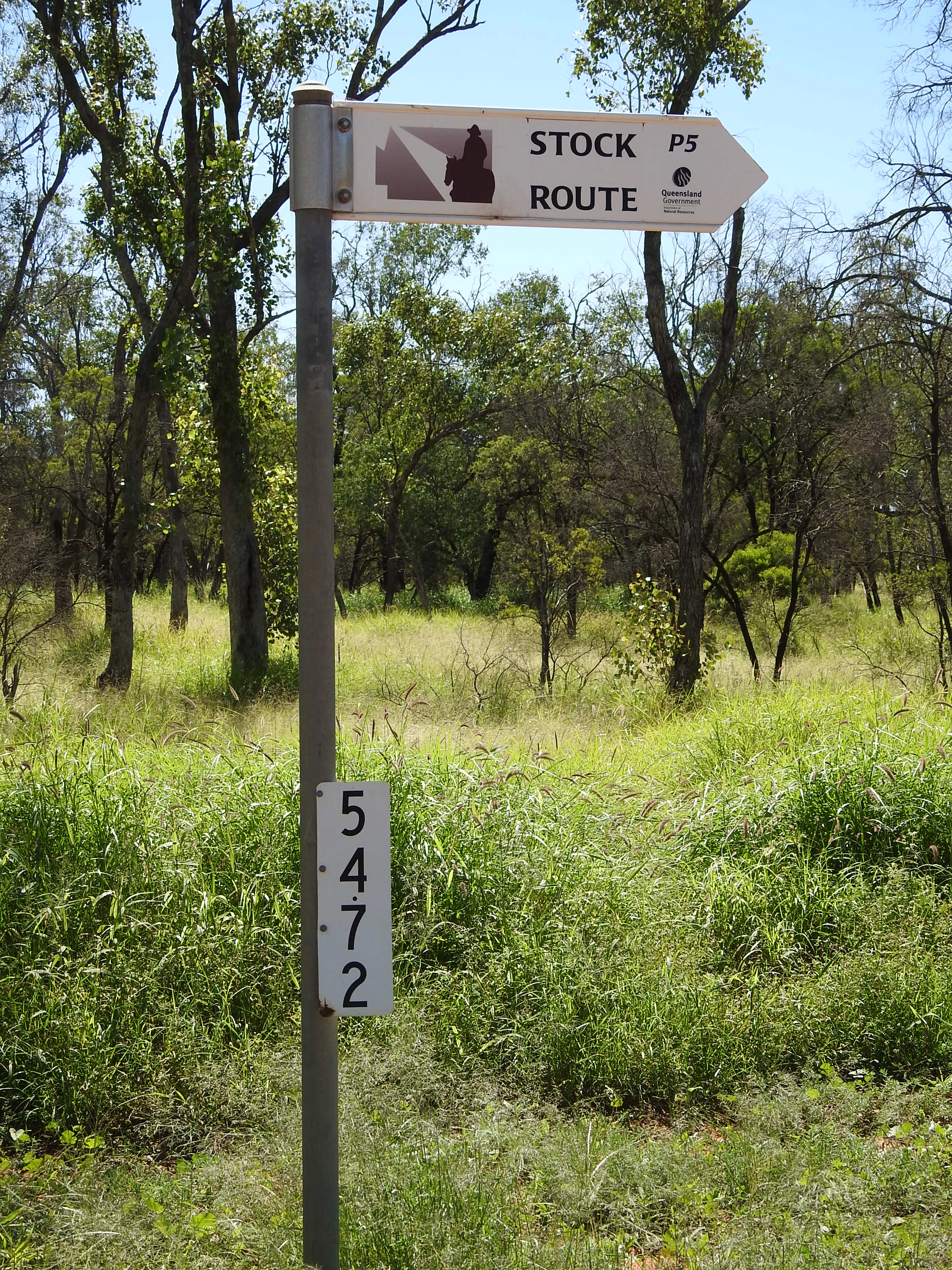
Stock route adjacent to the Barwon Highway at Weengallon, 2021

This highway is part of State Route 85, which extends for over 570 km (354 mi) from Bribie Island to Nindigully, duplexing with the Brisbane Valley Highway (National Route 17) from the D'Aguilar Highway to Esk, the New England Highway (State Route A3) from Hampton to Toowoomba, the Gore Highway (National Route A39 - formerly 85) from Toowoomba to the Leichhardt Highway, and the southern 19 km (12 mi) section of the Leichhardt Highway (also National Route A39) to Goondiwindi.

== Stock route ==
Like many Australian roads, the Barwon Highway follows a declared stock route. The road reserve for most stock routes is wider than for other roads (up to 1600 metres). When seen from the air (or in the Satellite view of Google maps) the substantial width of the western end (from Nindigully to Talwood) can be clearly seen due to the difference in colour between roadside brigalow scrub and adjacent cropland.

== Upgrades ==
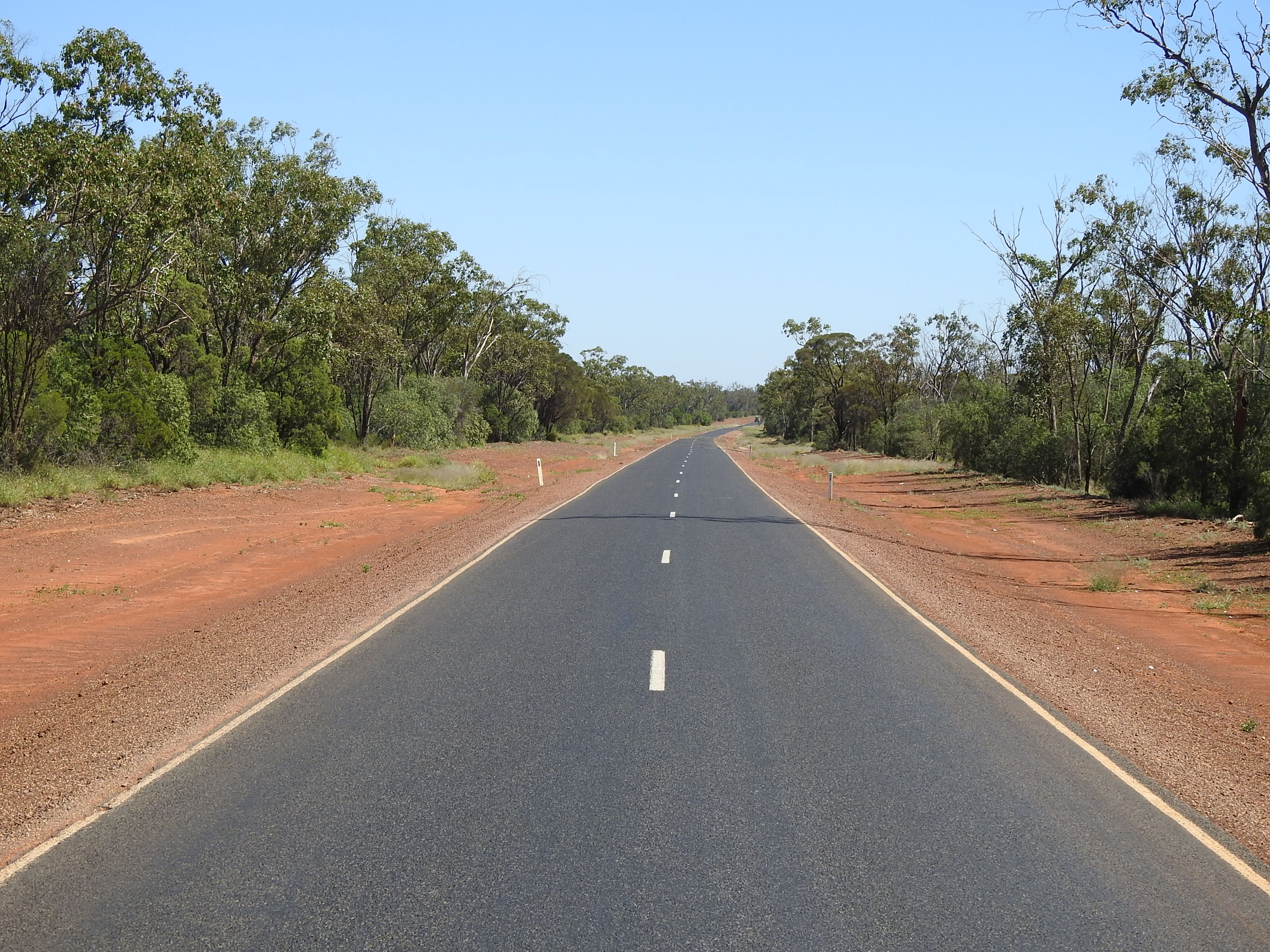
Barwon Highway in Weengallon, 2021

=== Pavement widening ===
A project to widen sections of pavement on the highway, at a cost of $6.75 million, was expected to complete in June 2022.

== Major intersections ==
| LGA | Location | km | mi | Destinations | Notes |
|---|---|---|---|---|---|
| Balonne | Nindigully | 0 | 0.0 | Carnarvon Highway (National Route 46) north – St George / south – Mungindi and Moree | Western end of Barwon Highway |
| Goondiwindi | Goondiwindi | 154.0 | 95.7 | Lagoon Street (State Route 85) east – Goondiwindi Town Centre | Barwon Highway turns north as West Street; The route to the Cunningham and Newell highways (also signed as State Route 85) continues through Goondiwindi as Lagoon Street, Russell Street, Albert Street and Marshall Street to the intersection described at the bottom of this table |
| Goondiwindi | Goondiwindi | 154.9 | 96.3 | Leichhardt Highway (National Route A39) north – Toowoomba / east (as Boundary Road) – Cunningham Highway (National Route 42) | Eastern end of Barwon Highway; State Route 85 continues north, duplexed with Leichhardt Highway |
| Goondiwindi | Goondiwindi | 158.6 | 98.5 | Cunningham Highway (National Route 42) north – St George, Brisbane and Rockhampton / Newell Highway (National Route A39) south – Moree and Dubbo | National Route A39 continues north, duplexed with Cunningham Highway, for 2.1 km, where it turns west as Leichhardt Highway |
1.000 mi = 1.609 km; 1.000 km = 0.621 mi

== See also ==
- Highways in Australia
- List of highways in Queensland
- Brigalow Belt
- List of highways numbered 85
