= North Bungunya, Queensland =

North Bungunya
- Suburb
- Interactive map of North Bungunya
- Coordinates: 28.2061°S 149.5086°E
- Country: Australia
- State: Queensland
- LGA: Goondiwindi Region
- Location: 101 km (63 mi) NW of Goondiwindi; 109 km (68 mi) E of St George; 299 km (186 mi) WSW of Toowoomba; 432 km (268 mi) WSW of Brisbane

Government
  - State electorate: Southern Downs
  - Federal division: Maranoa

Area
  - Total: 714.8 km^{2} (276.0 sq mi)

Population
  - Total: 35 (2021 census)
  - Density: 0.0490/km^{2} (0.1268/sq mi)
- Time zone: UTC+10:00 (AEST)
- Postcode: 4494
Suburbs around North Bungunya
St George	Flinton	Tarawera
St George	North Bungunya	Kioma
Talwood	Talwood	Bungunya

North Bungunya is a rural locality in the Goondiwindi Region, Queensland, Australia. In the 2021 census, North Bungunya had a population of 35 people.

== Geography ==
The Meandarra - Talwood Road forms part of the south-east boundary of the locality.

The land use is a mix of grazing on native vegetation and crop growing. The northern part of the locality mainly grazes, and crop growing is mostly done in the south of the locality.

== History ==
The locality was officially named and bounded on 26 November 1999.

== Demographics ==
In the 2016 census, North Bungunya had a population of 39 people.

In the 2021 census, North Bungunya had a population of 35 people.

== Education ==
There are no schools in North Bungunya. The nearest government primary schools are Westmar State School in Westmar to the north-east, Kioma State School in neighbouring Kioma to the east, Bungunya State School in neighbouring Bungunya to the south-east, and Talwood State School in neighbouring Talwood to the south. No secondary schools are nearby; the alternatives are distance education and boarding school.

== Economy ==
There are several homesteads in the locality:

- Aurifer Downs (28.2151°S 149.5582°E)
- Cairngorm (28.1004°S 149.5556°E)
- Foxborough (28.0078°S 149.4876°E)
- Llidem Vale (28.1333°S 149.4817°E)
- Ranchall (28.0384°S 149.6160°E)
- Three Valleys (28.1821°S 149.5084°E)
- Walton Downs (28.2047°S 149.5853°E)
- Wonga Downs (28.0881°S 149.4642°E)

== Transport ==
There are a number of airstrips, including:

- Wycanna airstrip (28.2254°S 149.4166°E)
- Sherwood airstrip (28.2690°S 149.4976°E)
