= Weengallon =

- Suburb
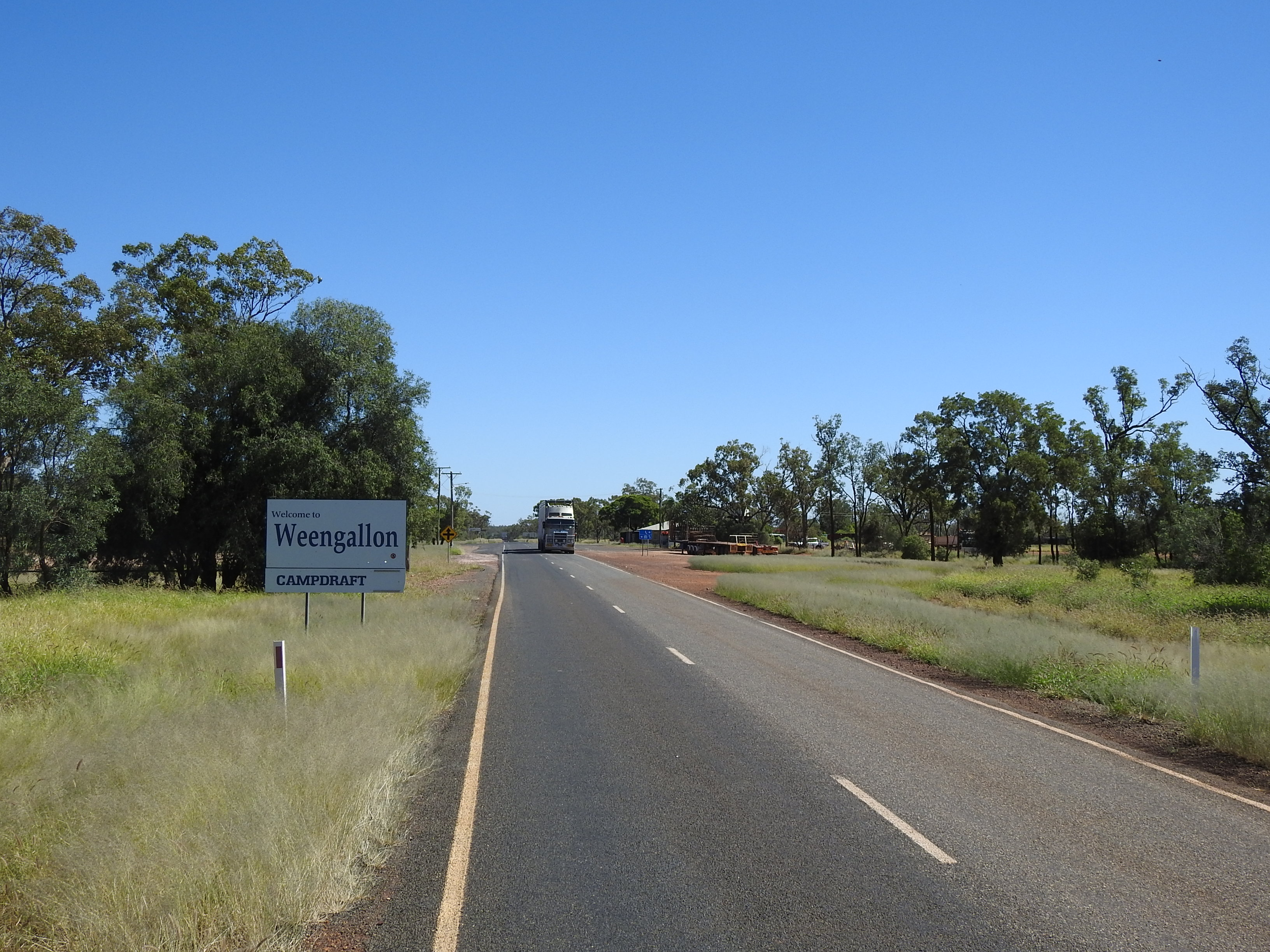
- Weengallon locality sign, eastern approach (2021)

- Interactive map of Weengallon
- Coordinates: 28.3583°S 149.1038°E
- Country: Australia
- State: Queensland
- LGA: Goondiwindi Region
- Location: 67.0 km (41.6 mi) SW of St George; 133 km (83 mi) W of Goondiwindi; 353 km (219 mi) WSW of Toowoomba; 483 km (300 mi) WSW of Brisbane

Government
  - State electorate: Southern Downs
  - Federal division: Maranoa

Area
  - Total: 855.5 km^{2} (330.3 sq mi)

Population
  - Total: 46 (2021 census)
  - Density: 0.0538/km^{2} (0.1393/sq mi)
- Time zone: UTC+10:00 (AEST)
- Postcode: 4497
Suburbs around Weengallon
St George	St George	St George
Thallon	Weengallon	Talwood
Thallon	Daymar	Talwood

Weengallon is a rural locality in the Goondiwindi Region, Queensland, Australia. In the 2021 census, Weengallon had a population of 46 people.

== Geography ==
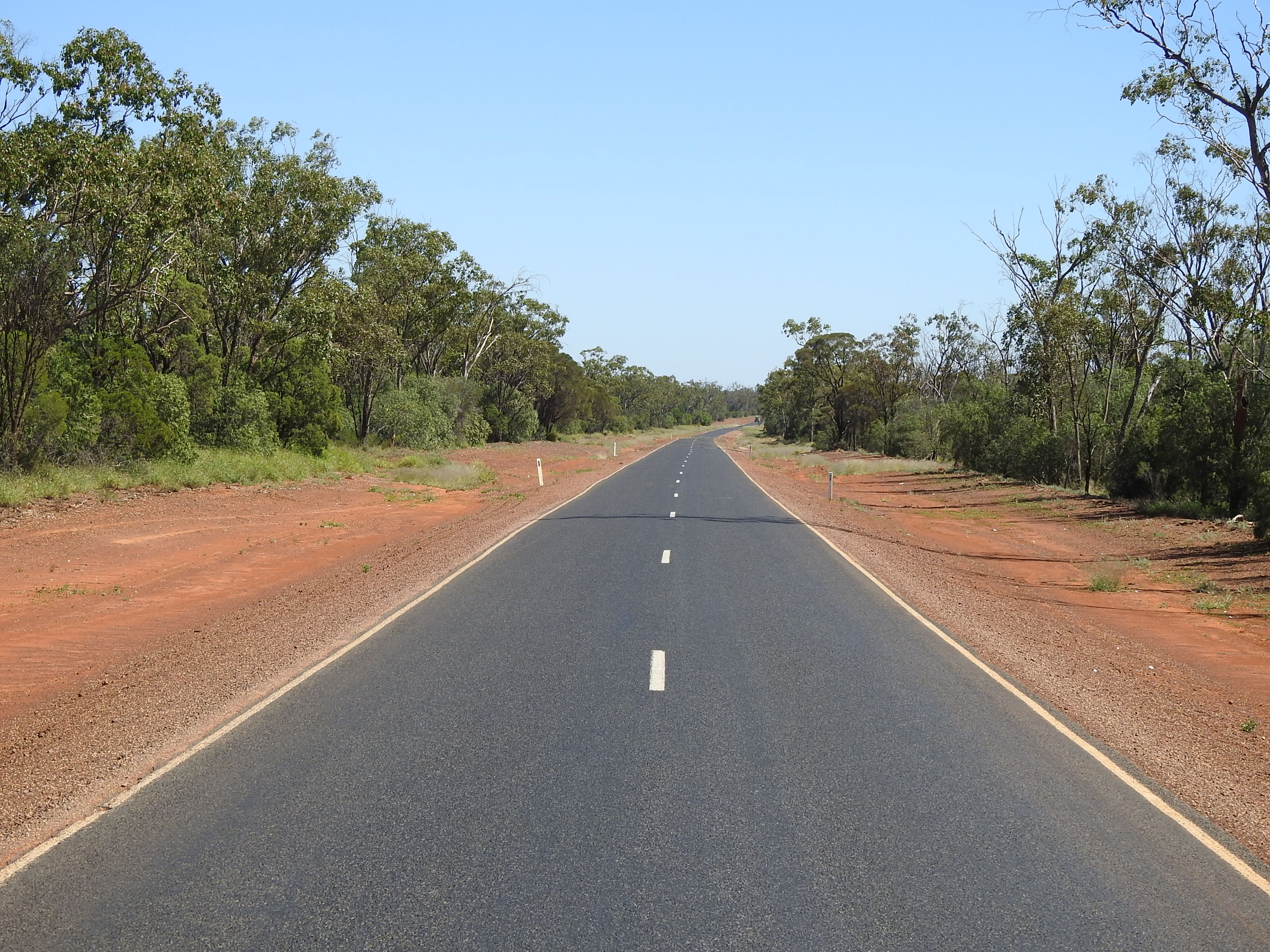
Barwood Highway towards Weengallon, 2021

The Barwon Highway enters the locality from the west (Talwood) and exits to the east (Thallon). The South-Western railway line enters the locality from the south-east (Talwood), forms part of the southern boundary of the locality, then exits to the south (Daymar).

== History ==
The significant cultural area of the Ngaru-gi Gali ('to drink') or Weengallon rock wells are four large water holes, some twelve metres deep, and several smaller ones. These wells were used by the Indigenous Australians, including the Kalkadoon as they moved from Mount Isa south for ceremonies and business towards Goondiwindi, and further coastal towards the Bunya Mountains. Another rock well exists at Thornby on the Moonie Highway near Saint George (27.969052°S 148.938276°E).

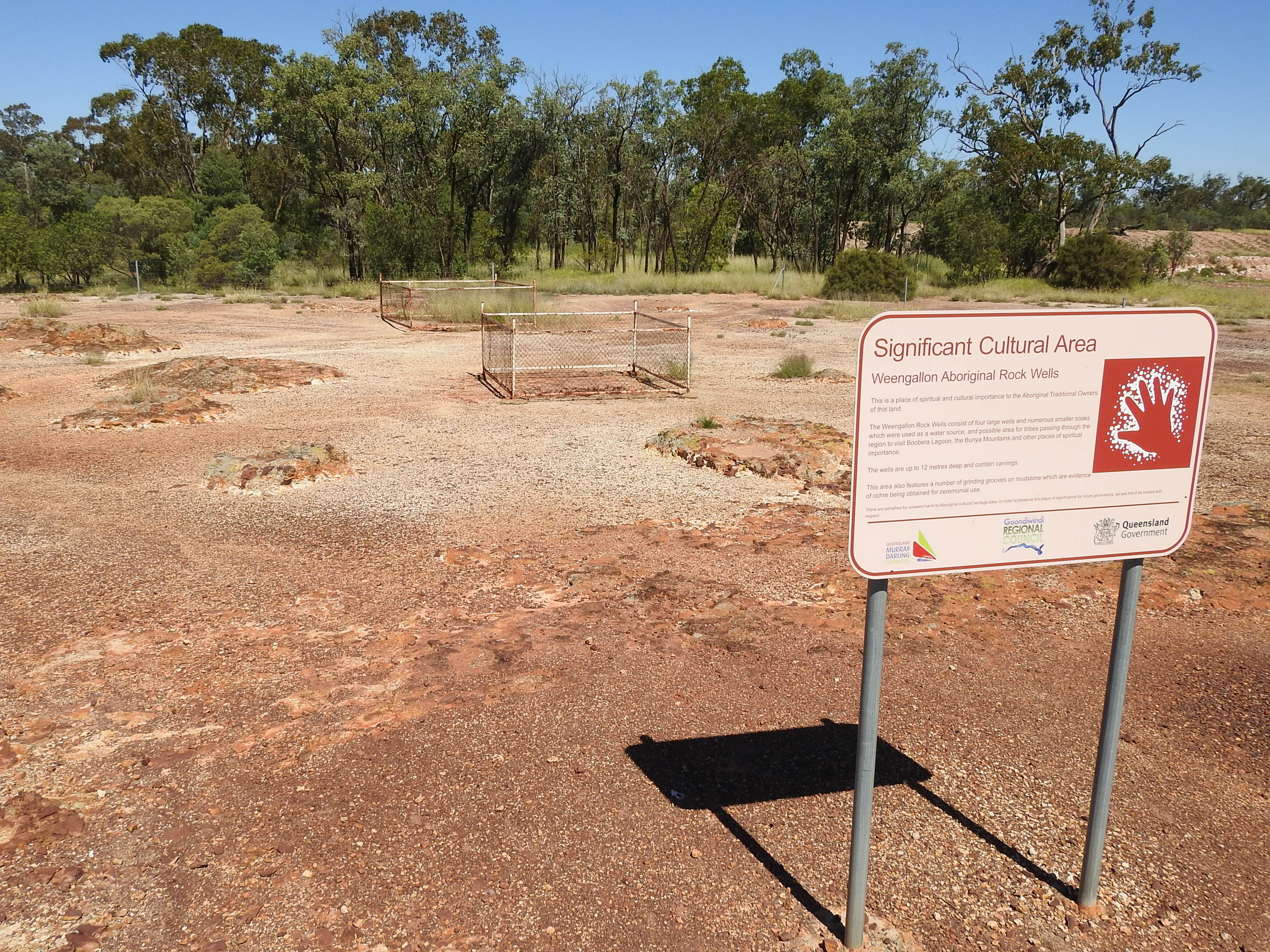
Weengallon Aboriginal rock wells (2021).

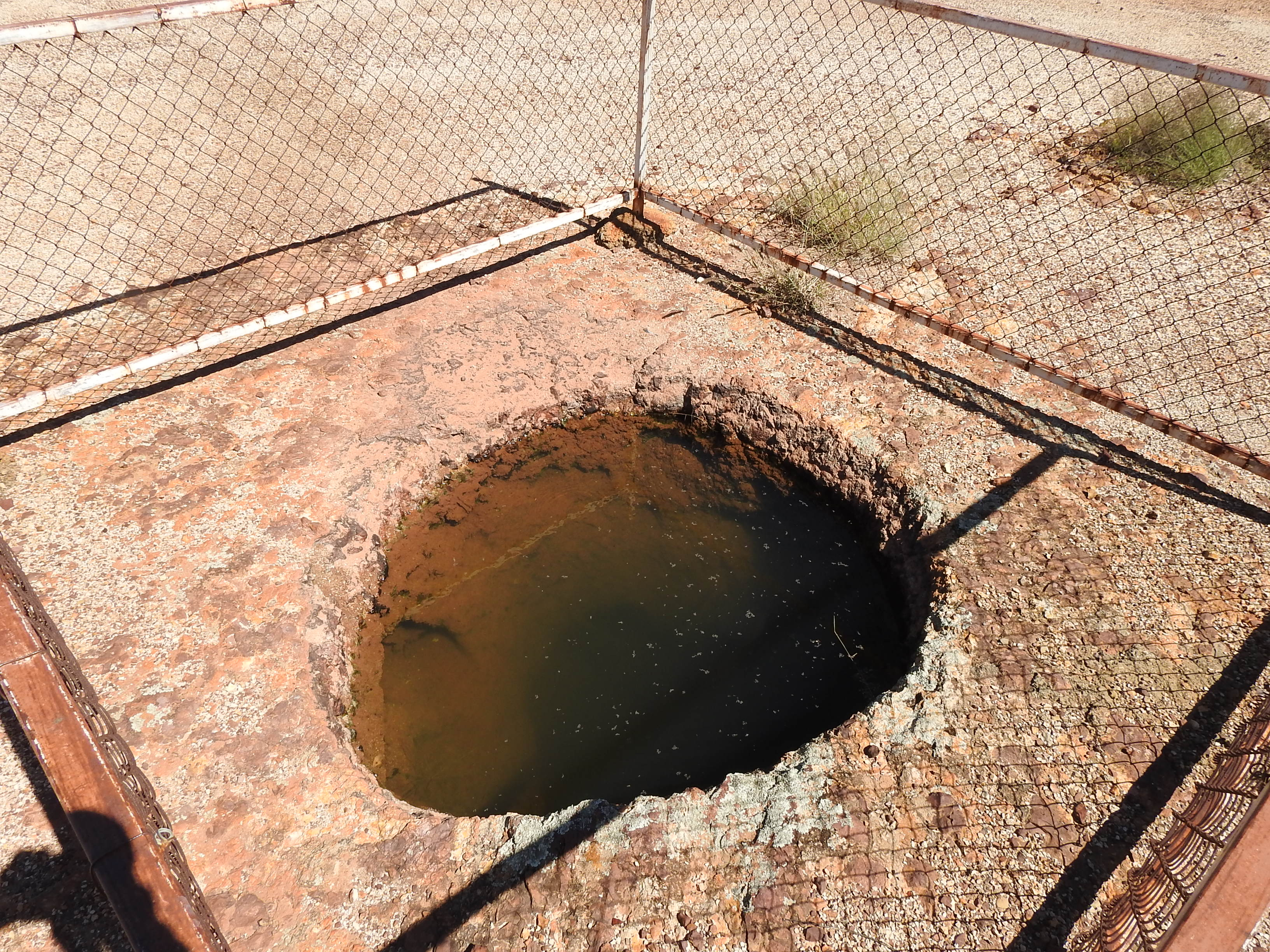
A large rock well (2021).

The Weengallon pastoral property was in existence by 1867, although in July that year, the 80 square miles (210 km^{2}) run was forfeited for sale. While for cattle, it was noted in 1906 that there was not always water, and a distance from a railway station or siding. A water bore was subsequently sunk in 1911, later down to 3,000 feet (910 m).

The Weengallon Progress Association was established by 1913.

Weengallon State School (also written as Weengallan State School) opened on 13 April 1916. It closed in 1922 due to low attendances. On 30 January 1962, Weengallon State School re-opened. It closed permanently in 1986.

By the 1930s, the locale had a public hall, and hosted a ball by Queensland Country Women's Association, cricket, and later, an annual Catholic Ball.

The Catholic Church of Our Lady Queen of Fatima was blessed and opened on Rev. W. Brennan on 6 March 1955. On 2 March 2025, the Roman Catholic Bishop of Toowoomba Ken Howell conducted a 70-year celebration at the church.

The locality was officially named and bounded on 26 November 1999.

== Demographics ==
In the 2016 census, Weengallon had a population of 30 people.

In the 2021 census, Weengallon had a population of 46 people.

== Amenities ==
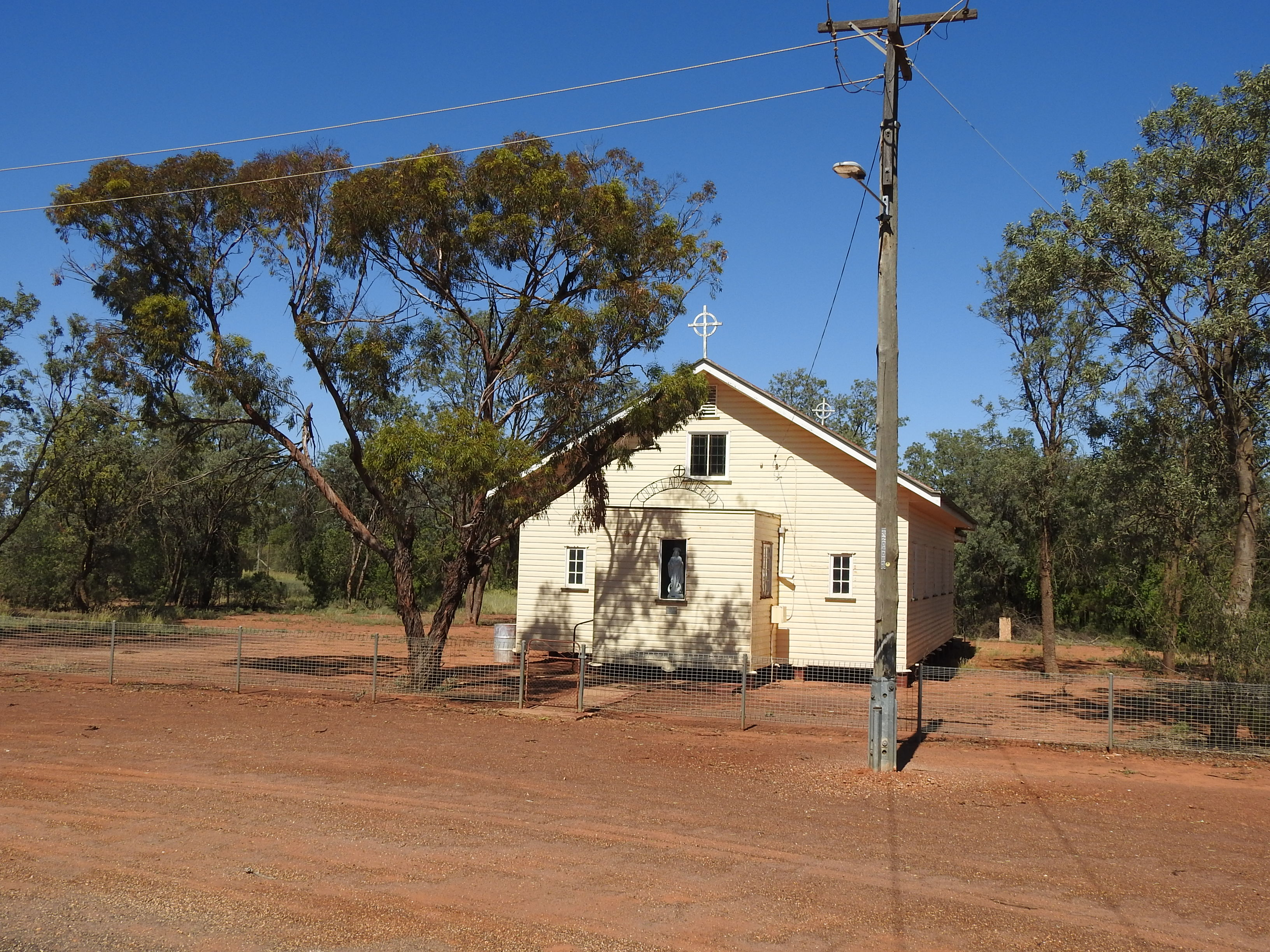
Our Lady Queen of Fatima Catholic Church, 2021

Our Lady Queen of Fatima Catholic Church is on the southern side of the Barwon Highway (28.35826°S 149.05464°E).

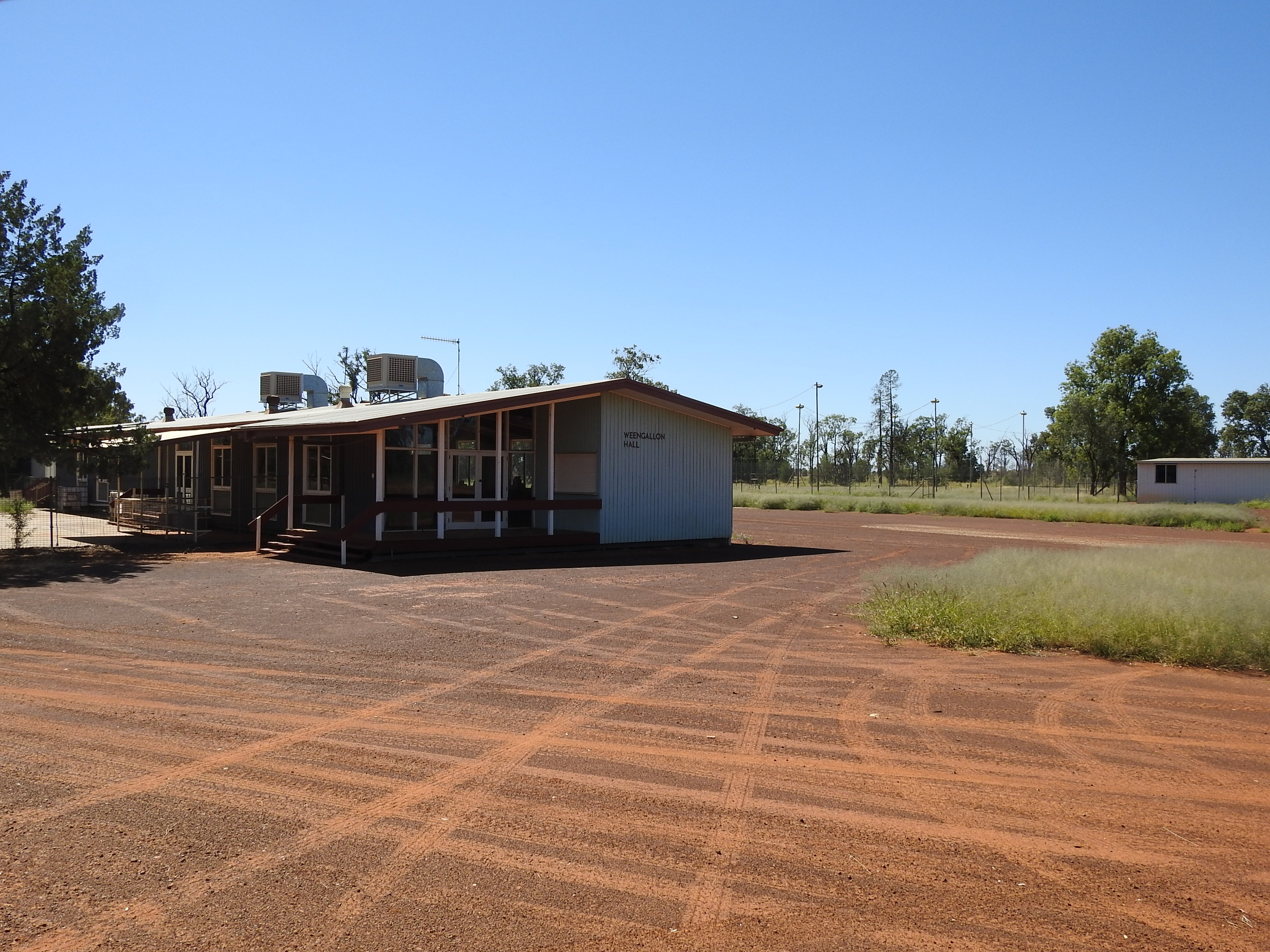
Weengallon community hall and tennis courts, 2021

Weengallon community hall and recreational reserve is at 13028 Barwon Highway (28.35656°S 149.05589°E).

== Education ==
There are no schools in Weengallon. The nearest government primary schools are Talwood State School in neighbouring Talwood to the east and Thallon State School in neighbouring Thallon to the south-west. There are no nearby secondary schools; the alternatives are distance education and boarding school.
