= Boomi, New South Wales =

Boomi New South Wales
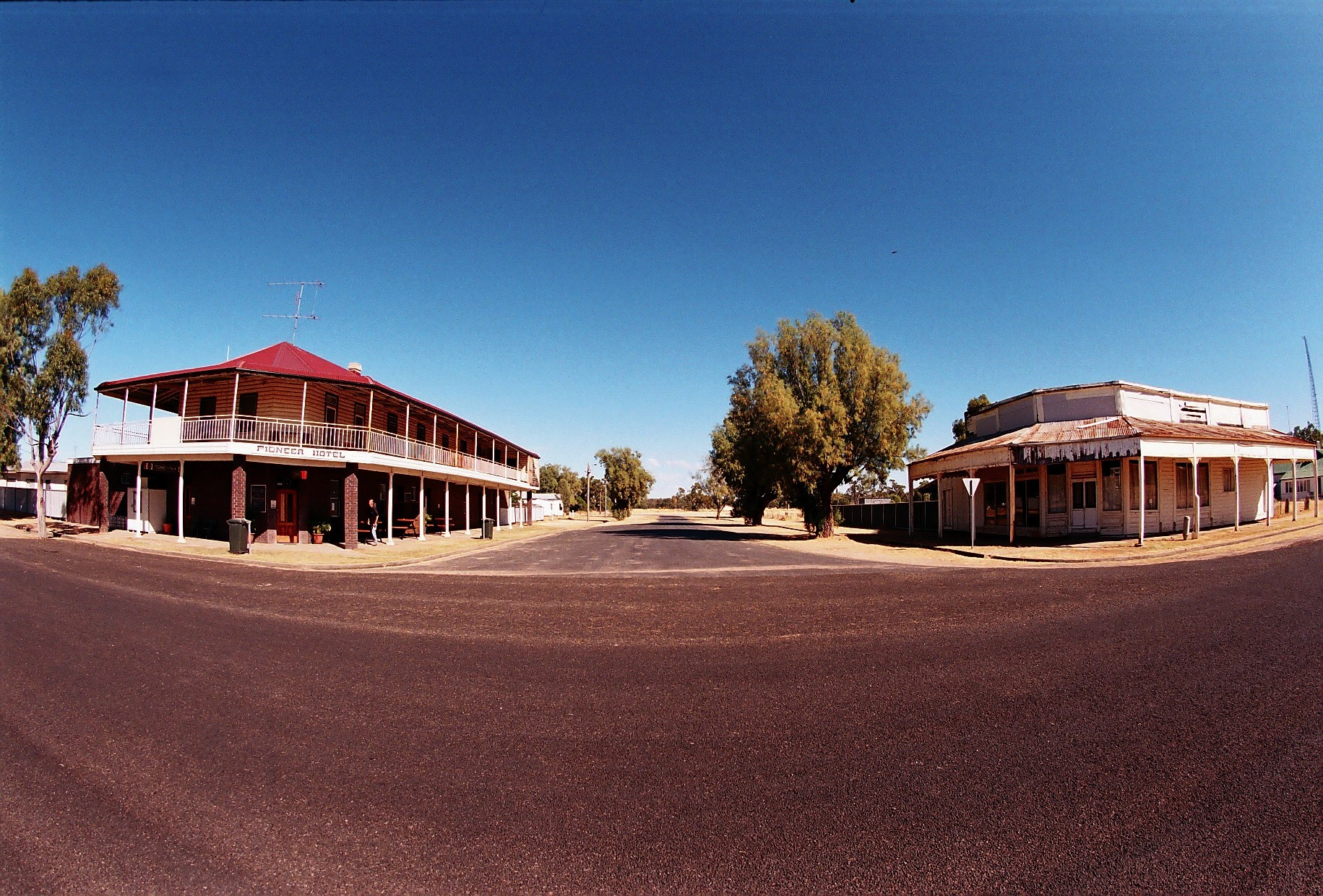
- Pioneer Hotel and an abandoned store

- Coordinates: 28°44′S 149°35′E
- Population: 201 (2016 census)
- Postcode(s): 2405
- Elevation: 184 m (604 ft)
- Location: 728 km (452 mi) NNW of Sydney; 432 km (268 mi) WSW of Brisbane; 94 km (58 mi) NE of Moree
- LGA(s): Moree Plains Shire
- State electorate(s): Northern Tablelands
- Federal division(s): Parkes

Boomi is a town in north western New South Wales, Australia. The town is in the Moree Plains Shire local government area, 728 kilometres (452 mi) north west of the state capital, Sydney, on the border on the New South Wales side of the MacIntyre River. Boomi is west of the Queensland town of Goondiwindi and north of Moree in New South Wales. At the 2016 census, Boomi and the surrounding farming area had a population of approximately 200.

== History ==
Gamilaraay (Gamilaroi, Kamilaroi, Comilroy) is a language from South-West Queensland and North-West New South Wales. The Gamilaraay language region includes the landscape within the local government boundaries of the Balonne Shire Council, including the towns of Dirranbandi, Thallon, Talwood and Bungunya as well as the border towns of Mungindi and Boomi extending to Moree, Tamworth and Coonabarabran in NSW.

== Climate ==
The average annual rainfall has been 22 inches (560 mm) but the recordings show that the pattern over the years has not been consistent. The. climate varies from long hot summers, when the temperatures can reach 43 °C (109 °F) and storms begin the summer rain often resulting in floods, to the winter months, which produce light rain and only occasionally result in floods. Cold nights in winter can go down to 0 °C (32 °F) causing frequent frosts, but the days are pleasant on the whole. Spring and autumn are short.

== Geography ==
The feature of the area is its flatness, referred to as the "black soil plains", but really it has a mixture with grey/brown loam, interspersed with sand ridges.

It is a flood-prone region with the McIntyre River falling one foot per mile (19 cm per kilometre) between Goondiwindi and Mungindi as it flows in a south-westerly direction. A flood peak at Goondiwindi can be expected a week later at the Kanowna gauge, seventy miles (110 kilometres) downstream. The McIntyre River has many tributaries; floods, flows and diversions affect and benefit the rich grazing and farming land.

The plains were once lightly forested with mainly gum, coolibah, box, wilga, belah, myall, Cypress pine and leopardwood trees. Many of these early timbers were used for buildings and fences. The region is renowned for its good merino sheep with 21 micron wool and quality beef cattle. Although this is marginal, graziers have been able to diversify into farming. Large scale clearing has become broadacre farming, producing premium grade wheat, oats, barley and fodder crops.

Wildlife of the area, pigs, kangaroos, emus and birds are bountiful and the rivers are a haven for fishing, especially cod and yellow belly.

== Rivers ==
Rivers and tributaries play important roles in the layout of the Boomi area. The headwaters of the McIntyre River system rise in the Great Dividing Range between Guyra and Stanthorpe, and flow north west towards Goondiwindi, then veering west. The Boomi region is situated on the New South Wales side of the McIntyre River between Goondiwindi, Queensland with Boggabilla adjoining and Mungindi 170 kilometres (110 mi) downstream, straddling the border. In earlier years the MacIntyre River was known as the Barwon River at the source of the Boomi River, but now reference is made to the Barwon River after the confluence with the Weir River.

The Weir River rises in south east Queensland and parallels the Barwon River for a short distance, north of the Boomi region from Bonanga, spilling over into the Barwon River, during flood flows, which it eventually joins, towards Mungindi.

The Gnoura Gnoura Creek branches out of the Boomi River at Boronga, running west before it flows into the Barwon River on Barra. The Boomi River is a tributary of the McIntyre and Barwon River junction. It meanders downstream, flowing back into the Barwon River south of Mungindi.

The Whalan Creek begins in the Boggabilla area, out of the McIntyre River. It then flows in a stream which, at times, forms into low swamps before becoming a larger waterway and running into the Boomi River, before the Boomi River meets the Barwon River.

Within these tributaries there are many lagoons, channels and gullies which are small, but carry a large volume of water during flood time: this is a river region. In most cases the tributaries provide the necessary stock and domestic water, supplemented on some holdings by bore drains or dams.
