= Stanthorpe–Texas–Inglewood Road =

Road in Australia

Stanthorpe–Texas–Inglewood Road Queensland

General information
- Type: Rural road
- Length: 152.8 km (95 mi)
- Route number(s): State Route 89

Major junctions
- East end: High Street, Stanthorpe
- Amiens Road (Tourist Route 5); Stanthorpe–Inglewood Road (State Route Alt89); Glenlyon Dam Road (Tourist Route 8); Texas–Yelarbon Road
- West end: Cunningham Highway (National Route 42), Inglewood

Location(s)
- Major settlements: Texas

Stanthorpe–Texas–Inglewood Road is a continuous 152.8 kilometres (94.9 mi) road route in the Southern Downs and Goondiwindi regions of Queensland, Australia. It has two official names: Stanthorpe–Texas Road and Inglewood–Texas Road. The entire route is signed as State Route 89. Tourist Drives 5 (Amiens) and 8 (Glenlyon Dam) and the Shearer's Way all start in Stanthorpe and run concurrent with this road for part of its length.

Stanthorpe–Texas Road (number 232) is a state-controlled district road rated as a local road of regional significance (LRRS) and Inglewood–Texas Road (number 231) is a state-controlled regional road.

Note that on Google Maps the section of Stanthorpe–Texas Road from Stanthorpe to Pikes Creek is shown as Texas Road. This is the name in use prior to the road becoming state-controlled. It remains in use with the approval of the regional council and the state government. A similar situation applies in Texas, where a short section within the town retains the name, Mingoola Road. This also indicates the destination of that road before it was connected to Stanthorpe.

== Route description ==
The road commences as Stanthorpe–Texas Road (Connor Street) at an intersection with High Street in Stanthorpe. High Street is the former route of the New England Highway through Stanthorpe. The road runs generally west and south-west towards Texas, passing through several rural localities (see below). While still in Stanthorpe it passes under the current New England Highway, and Tourist Drive 5 turns north to Amiens.

The road runs through Broadwater and Greenlands, which are part of the Stanthorpe wine region, but few vineyards are visible from the road.

In Pikedale, the Stanthorpe–Inglewood Road (Alternate State Route 89) exits to the north-west. From here the road tends more to the south-west and south, passing through Pikes Creek. In Glenlyon, the Glenlyon Dam Road exits to the south, and Tourist Drive 8 and the Shearer's Way follow it. From here the road again turns west.

The road then runs through Silver Spur and enters Texas as Mingoola Road, Fleming Street and High Street. At an intersection at the western end of High Street the name changes to Inglewood–Texas Road and it exits to the north-west as Greenup Street. While still in Texas, the Texas–Yelarbon Road exits to the west. Texas Airport is adjacent to this intersection.

In Limevale, the Greenup–Limevale Road exits to the north-east.

In Brush Creek, the Inglewood–Beebo Road exits to the south-west. The road enters Inglewood as Princess Street, where it ends at an intersection with the Cunningham Highway.

=== Tourist Drive 5 ===
Tourist Drive 5 runs from Stanthorpe to Thulimbah on the New England Highway, travelling via Amiens, Bapaume, Passchendaele and Pozieres.

=== Tourist Drive 8 ===
Tourist Drive 8, also known as the Glenlyon Dam Drive, runs from Stanthorpe to Glenlyon Dam, travelling via State Route 89 and Glenlyon Dam Road.

=== Shearer's Way ===
The Shearer's Way follows Tourist Drive 8 to Glenlyon Dam, and then follows Pinnacle Road and Riverton Road to Texas.

== Intersecting state-controlled roads ==
The following state-controlled roads intersect with this road:

- Stanthorpe–Inglewood Road
- Texas–Yelarbon Road

=== Stanthorpe–Inglewood Road ===
Stanthorpe–Inglewood Road
- Location: Stanthorpe–Texas Road, Pikedale to Cunningham Highway, Oman Ama
- Length: 53.8 km (33.4 mi)
- Route number: ALT89

Stanthorpe–Inglewood Road is a state-controlled district road (number 234), rated as a local road of regional significance (LRRS). It starts at an intersection with Stanthorpe–Texas Road (State Route 89) in Pikedale. It runs north-west as State Route Alt89, passing through Terrica, Warroo and Coolmunda for 53.8 kilometres (33.4 mi) to Oman Ama, where it ends at an intersection with the Cunningham Highway. Inglewood is a further 20.1 kilometres (12.5 mi) to the west on the Cunningham Highway. The road's only major intersection is with Greenup–Limevale Road in Coolmunda, which is part of the shortest route from Warwick to Texas.

=== Texas–Yelarbon Road ===
Texas–Yelarbon Road
- Location: Inglewood–-Texas Road, Texas to Cunningham Highway, Yelarbon
- Length: 56.8 km (35.3 mi)

Texas–Yelarbon Road is a state-controlled district road (number 2322), rated as a local road of regional significance (LRRS). It starts at an intersection with Inglewood–Texas Road (State Route 89) in Texas. It runs north-west, passing through Smithlea, Beebo and Glenarbon for 56.8 kilometres (35.3 mi) to Yelarbon, where it ends at an intersection with the Cunningham Highway.

== History of Stanthorpe roads ==
When tin was discovered in commercial quantities in 1872, there were several pastoral runs in the area surrounding what is now Stanthorpe. When the price of tin fell a few years later, some miners turned to farming. Land for farming became available in several areas to the west.

In 1877, land that had been part of many large pastoral runs in Queensland was made available for closer settlement. These included modern-day Nundubbermere and what is now Pikes Creek.

As land was cleared and smaller farms were established in these areas, a road was built from Stanthorpe to enable the transport of produce to market.

== History of Texas roads ==
In 1877, land that had been part of the Texas pastoral run was opened up for selection, as was land to the east in what is now Bonshaw and Mingoola.

Land clearing and farm establishment occurred as parts of the large pastoral runs were subdivided. A road was built to support the farms. In time the development of farms and roads from Texas and Stanthorpe reached a common point, and a connecting road was the result. Although it was built much earlier, it was not until 2006 that the last section of the road was sealed.

== History of Inglewood roads ==
From 1848, many pastoral runs were established in the areas around Inglewood. To the south, the area that is now Brush Creek was the site of a large run established in the 1850s. Part of that land was opened for selection in 1877, and soon smaller farms were established.

This development, plus a perceived need for Texas to be better connected to the nearest commercial centre, led to the building of a road from Inglewood to Texas. This road was the only means of commerce between the towns until the opening of the Texas railway line in 1930.

== Major intersections ==
All distances are from Google Maps.

LGA	Location	km	mi	Destinations	Notes
Southern Downs	Stanthorpe	0	0.0	High Street – northeast – Applethorpe, Warwick / southwest – Stanthorpe CBD, Severnlea, Wallangarra	Eastern end of Stanthorpe–Texas–Inglewood Road. The road continues west as Stanthorpe–Texas Road (Connor Street) (State Route 89)
Southern Downs	Stanthorpe	1.6	0.99	Pancor Road – to: New England Highway (A15) northeast – Warwick / southwest – Wallangarra	
Southern Downs	Stanthorpe	2.4	1.5	Amiens Road (Tourist Drive 5) north – Amiens	
Southern Downs	Pikedale	34.7	21.6	Stanthorpe–Inglewood Road (Alternate State Route 89) northwest – Oman Ama, Inglewood	
Southern Downs	Glenlyon	64.6	40.1	Glenlyon Dam Road (Tourist Drive 8) south – Glenlyon Dam	The Shearer's Way also follows this route, continuing from Glenlyon Dam to Texas.
Goondiwindi	Texas	99.0	61.5	Inglewood–Texas Road (Broadway) (no route number) south – Queensland / New South Wales border (Dumaresq River), Bruxner Highway	Road continues northwest as Inglewood–Texas Road (State Route 89)
Goondiwindi	Texas	101.3	62.9	Texas–Yelarbon Road – west – Yelarbon	
Goondiwindi	Limevale	118.3	73.5	Greenup–Limevale Road – Coolmunda, Greenup	
Goondiwindi	Brush Creek	138.8	86.2	Inglewood–Beebo Road – southwest – Beebo	
Goondiwindi	Inglewood	152.8	94.9	Cunningham Highway (National Route 42) east – Warwick / west – Goondiwindi	Western end of Inglewood–Texas Road (State Route 89)
1.000 mi = 1.609 km; 1.000 km = 0.621 mi: Route transition

== See also ==
- List of road routes in Queensland
- List of tourist drives in Queensland
- List of numbered roads in Queensland
