= Beebo, Queensland =

Beebo
- Suburb
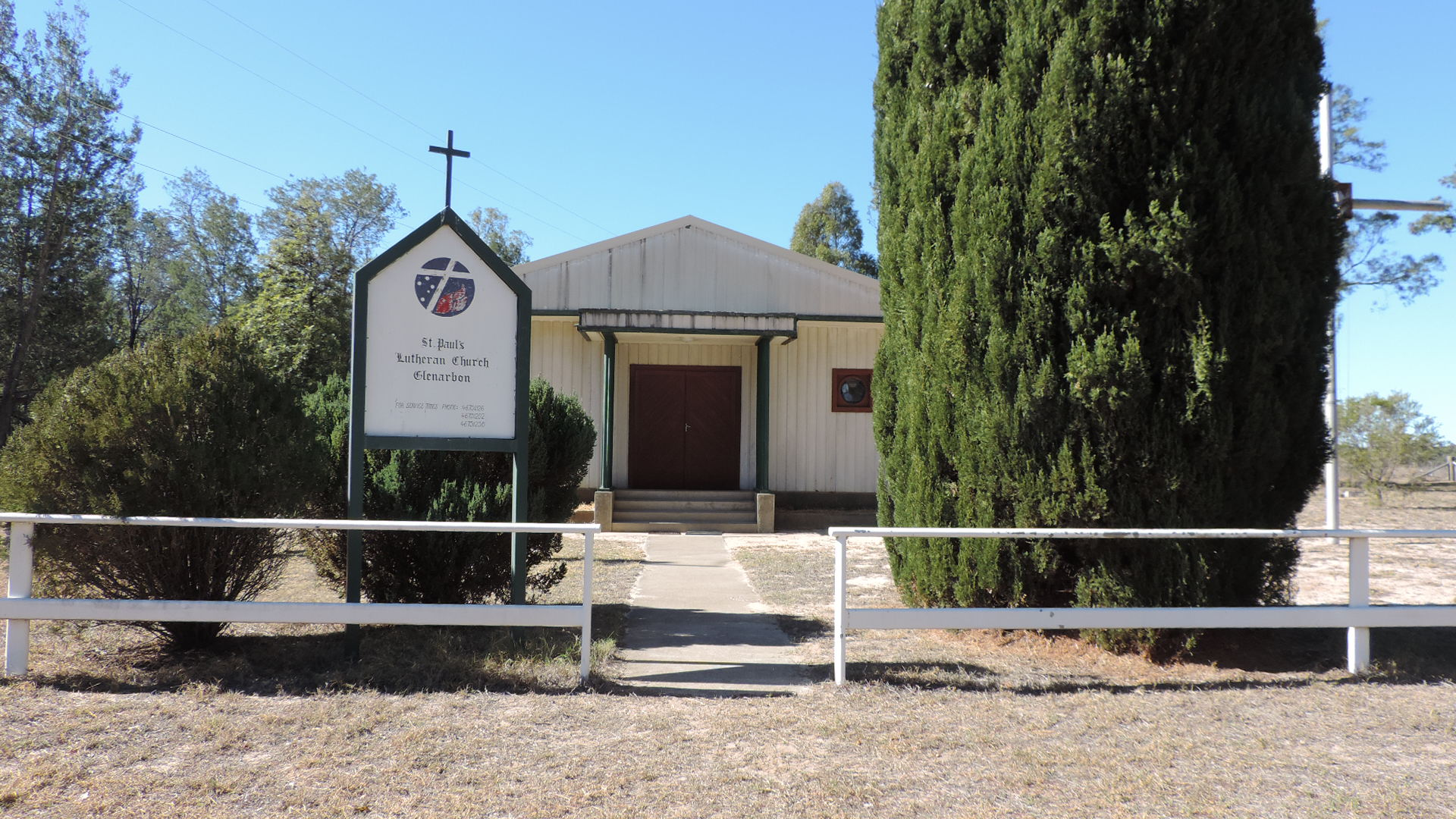
- St Paul's Lutheran Church, 2019

- Interactive map of Beebo
- Coordinates: 28.6827°S 150.9930°E
- Country: Australia
- State: Queensland
- LGA: Goondiwindi Region
- Location: 30.8 km (19.1 mi) NW of Texas; 52 km (32 mi) SSW of Inglewood; 83.6 km (51.9 mi) ESE of Goondiwindi; 196 km (122 mi) SW of Toowoomba; 313 km (194 mi) SW of Brisbane
- Established: 1877

Government
  - State electorate: Southern Downs
  - Federal division: Maranoa

Area
  - Total: 232.6 km^{2} (89.8 sq mi)

Population
  - Total: 50 (2021 census)
  - Density: 0.215/km^{2} (0.56/sq mi)
- Time zone: UTC+10:00 (AEST)
- Postcode: 4385
Suburbs around Beebo
Glenarbon	Glenarbon	Brush Creek
Glenarbon	Beebo	Limevale
Camp Creek (NSW)	Camp Creek (NSW)	Smithlea

Beebo is a rural locality in the Goondiwindi Region, Queensland, Australia. It is on the Queensland border with New South Wales. In the 2021 census, Beebo had a population of 50 people.

== Geography ==
Beebo is bounded to the south-west by the Dumaresq River, the border between Queensland and New South Wales.

Magee is a neighbourhood in the locality (28.6666°S 151.05°E) around the now-abandoned Magee railway station on the former Texas branch railway line.

The north-west of the locality is within the Yelarbon State Forest which extends into Glenarbon to the north and west and into Brush Creek to the north-east.

== History ==
Beebo was opened for selection on 17 April 1877; 21 square miles (54 km^{2}) were available.

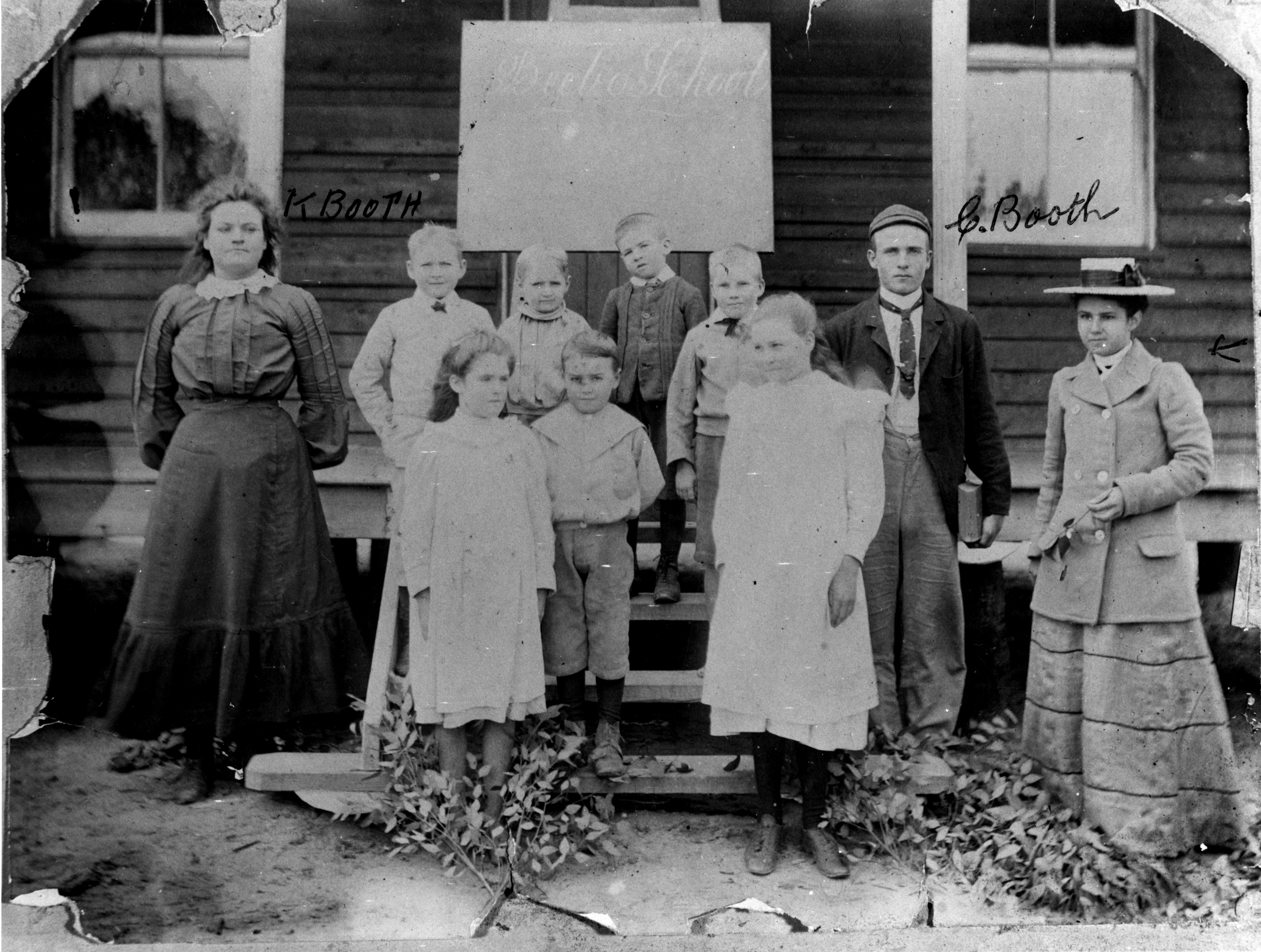
Beebo State School, early 1900s

The Beebo Provisional School opened on 4 November 1901 and became Beebo State School on 1 January 1909. The school closed on several occasions due to low student numbers, finally closing on 25 September 1964. The school was on the Texas Yelarbon Road at 28.7232°S 150.9654°E.

The Texas branch railway line from Inglewood to Texas opened on 3 November 1930 with Beebo being served by the Magee railway station (28.66829°S 151.05148°E). The name Magee comes from Magee Creek, which was named after a stockman.

Glenarbon Provisional School opened on 17 March 1933, becoming Glenarbon State School in 1940. It closed in 1982. The school was located just to the south of the Texas Yelarbon Road at 28.6835°S 150.8910°E within the present-day boundaries of Beebo. The site is now a recreational reserve operated by the Goondiwindi Regional Council.

St Paul's Lutheran Church was established circa December 1959.

== Demographics ==
In the 2016 census, Beebo had a population of 84 people.

In the 2021 census, Beebo had a population of 50 people.

== Amenities ==
The former Glenarbon State School is now a recreational reserve operated by the Goondiwindi Regional Council.

St Paul's Lutheran Church is on Glenarbon Church Road at 28.6783°S 150.8919°E. It has a small cemetery.

There is a public hall on the Texas Yelarbon Road (28.7130°S 150.9410°E).

== Education ==
There are no schools in Beebo. The nearest government primary schools are Inglewood State School in Inglewood to the north, Texas State School in Texas to the south-east, and Yelarbon State School in Yelarbon to the west. The nearest government secondary schools are Inglewood State School (to Year 10) in Inglewood and Texas State School (for Year 10) in Texas. The nearest government school with secondary schooling to Year 12 is Goondiwindi State High School in Goondiwindi to the west, but it is too distant for a daily commute; alternatives would be distance education or boarding school.
