= Warroo, Queensland =

Warroo
- Suburb
- Interactive map of Warroo
- Coordinates: 28.6386°S 151.4202°E
- Country: Australia
- State: Queensland
- LGA: Goondiwindi Region
- Location: 41.1 km (25.5 mi) SE of Inglewood; 67.8 km (42.1 mi) WNW of Stanthorpe; 100 km (62 mi) SW of Warwick; 133 km (83 mi) SW of Goondiwindi; 255 km (158 mi) SW of Brisbane

Government
  - State electorate: Southern Downs
  - Federal division: Maranoa

Area
  - Total: 381.3 km^{2} (147.2 sq mi)

Population
  - Total: 39 (2021 census)
  - Density: 0.1023/km^{2} (0.265/sq mi)
- Time zone: UTC+10:00 (AEST)
- Postcode: 4387
Suburbs around Warroo
Greenup	Oman Ama	Terrica
Greenup	Warroo	Pikedale
Silver Spur	Glenlyon	Pikes Creek

Warroo is a rural locality in the Goondiwindi Region, Queensland, Australia. In the 2021 census, Warroo had a population of 39 people.

== Geography ==
The Stanthorpe - Inglewood Road enters the locality from the north-east (Terrica) and exits to the north-west (Greenup).

Warroo has the following mountains:

- Mount Bullaganang in the north of the locality (28.5831°S 151.4133°E), rising to 623 metres (2,044 ft) above sea level
- Mount You You in the east of the locality (28.6299°S 151.5311°E) 748 metres (2,454 ft)
- Fish Hole Mountain in the south of the locality (28.7430°S 151.4423°E) 706 metres (2,316 ft)

The land use is predominantly grazing on native vegetation.

== History ==
Copper was discovered in 1897. The Ashton Copper Mine operated until about 1900, yielding copper and silver. The Commodore Mine operated from 1905 to 1913. The Warroo Mine operated from 1910 to 1913, reopening in 1931, and again from 1990 to 1992.

== Demographics ==
In the 2016 census, Warroo had a population of 25 people.

In the 2021 census, Warroo had a population of 39 people.

== Education ==
There are no schools in Warroo. The nearest government primary schools are Inglewood State School in Inglewood to the north-west, Greenlands State School in Greenlands to the east, and Texas State School in Texas to the south-west. The nearest government secondary schools are Inglewood State School (to Year 10), Texas State School (to Year 10), and Stanthorpe State High School (to Year 12) in Stanthorpe to the east, but some students in Warroo would be too distant to attend these secondary schools; the alternatives are distance education and boarding school.
