= Greenup, Queensland =

Greenup
- Suburb
- Interactive map of Greenup
- Coordinates: 28.6155°S 151.2891°E
- Country: Australia
- State: Queensland
- LGA: Goondiwindi Region
- Location: 41.7 km (25.9 mi) NNW of Texas; 48.5 km (30.1 mi) SE of Inglewood; 86.1 km (53.5 mi) W of Stanthorpe; 135 km (84 mi) E of Goondiwindi; 283 km (176 mi) SW of Brisbane

Government
  - State electorate: Southern Downs
  - Federal division: Maranoa

Area
  - Total: 181.2 km^{2} (70.0 sq mi)

Population
  - Total: 9 (2021 census)
  - Density: 0.0497/km^{2} (0.129/sq mi)
- Time zone: UTC+10:00 (AEST)
- Postcode: 4387
Suburbs around Greenup
Coolmunda	Oman Ama	Warroo
Brush Creek	Greenup	Warroo
Limevale	Silver Spur	Silver Spur

Greenup is a rural locality in the Goondiwindi Region, Queensland, Australia. In the 2021 census, Greenup had a population of 9 people.

== Geography ==
The terrain is undulating, with elevations ranging from 700 metres (2,300 ft) above sea level in the south-east of the locality through to 350 metres (1,150 ft) above sea level along the creeks.

The predominant land use is grazing on native vegetation.

== History ==
Greenup Provisional School opened on 11 March 1918, but closed in 1922 due to low student numbers. In 1923 it reopened as a half-time school sharing a teacher with the Warroo Road Provisional School (formerly the Coolmunda Provisional School). From 1930, it was a part-time school sharing a teacher with both the Warroo Road Provisional School and the Brush Creek school. However the closure of these other two schools allowed Greenup to return to full-time status, closing in 1940 due to low student numbers. On 7 February 1955, a new Greenup State School was opened which operated until 10 December 1976 when it closed due to insufficient students.

== Demographics ==
In the 2016 census, Greenup had a population of 23 people.

In the 2021 census, Greenup had a population of 9 people.

== Education ==
There are no schools in the locality. The nearest government primary schools are Texas State School in Texas to the south-west and the Inglewood State School in Inglewood to the north-west. These two schools both offer secondary education to Year 10, but there is no nearby school offering secondary education to Year 12. Stanthorpe State High School in Stanthorpe to the east offers secondary schooling to Year 12, but it is sufficiently distant that distance education and boarding school would be other options.
