= Glen Arbor (disambiguation) =

Glen Arbor may refer to:

- Glen Arbor, California, an unincorporated community in Santa Cruz County
- Glen Arbor, Michigan, an unincorporated community in Leelanau County
- Glen Arbor Township, Michigan, in Leelanau County

== See also ==
- Glenarbon, Queensland, Australia
