= Smithlea, Queensland =

Smithlea
- Suburb
- Interactive map of Smithlea
- Coordinates: 28.8066°S 151.0847°E
- Country: Australia
- State: Queensland
- LGA: Goondiwindi Region
- Location: 16.5 km (10.3 mi) NW of Texas; 97.7 km (60.7 mi) ESE of Goondiwindi; 114 km (71 mi) W of Stanthorpe; 153 km (95 mi) SW of Warwick; 311 km (193 mi) SW of Brisbane

Government
  - State electorate: Southern Downs
  - Federal division: Maranoa

Area
  - Total: 84.6 km^{2} (32.7 sq mi)

Population
  - Total: 41 (2021 census)
  - Density: 0.485/km^{2} (1.255/sq mi)
- Time zone: UTC+10:00 (AEST)
- Postcode: 4385
Suburbs around Smithlea
Beebo	Beebo	Limevale
Camp Creek (NSW)	Smithlea	Limevale
Texas (NSW)	Texas (NSW)	Texas

Smithlea is a rural locality in the Goondiwindi Region, Queensland, Australia. It is on the Queensland border with New South Wales. In the 2021 census, Smithlea had a population of 41 people.

== Geography ==
The Dumaresq River forms the southern and western boundary of the locality and is the border between Queensland and New South Wales.

Texas–Yelarbon Road enters the locality from the south-east (Texas) and runs through the south and then west of the locality loosely parallel to the river before exiting to the north-west (Beebo).

The land use is predominantly grazing on native vegetation with some crop growing in areas close to the river.

== History ==
Smithfield Provisional School opened on 7 May 1900, becoming Smithfield State School on 1 January 1909. It closed in 1964. It was at approx 1381 Texas Yelarbon Road (28.80420°S 151.04598°E).

A branch railway line from Inglewood to Texas via the Smithlea area was approved in1914. Howvever, construction did not begin until February 1929 with the jobs created being sought by many hundreds of men out of work due to the Great Depression. The 55-kilometre (34 mi) Texas railway line was officially opened on Monday 10 November 1930 by Godfrey Morgan, the Queensland Minister for Railways.

The Smithlea area was served by the Mundoey railway siding (28.79355°S 151.08348°E), which opened in September 1930. It takes its name from the nearby Waddy Mundoey Creek, which is an Aboriginal name describing a European man with a wooden leg.

By 1963, passenger services on the railway line had ceased. Regular services were withdrawn in 1985 being replaced by motor truck. The line closed on 1 January 1994 and is retained by Queensland Rail as a non-operational corridor. The track was left in place but other facilities were removed.

== Demographics ==
In the 2016 census, Smithlea had a population of 47 people.

In the 2021 census, Smithlea had a population of 41 people.

== Education ==
There are no schools in Smithlea. The nearest government primary and secondary school is Texas State School (Prep to Year 10) in neighbouring Texas to the south-east. There are no secondary schools providing education to Year 12 nearby; the alternatives are distance education and boarding school.
