= Boyce Gardens =

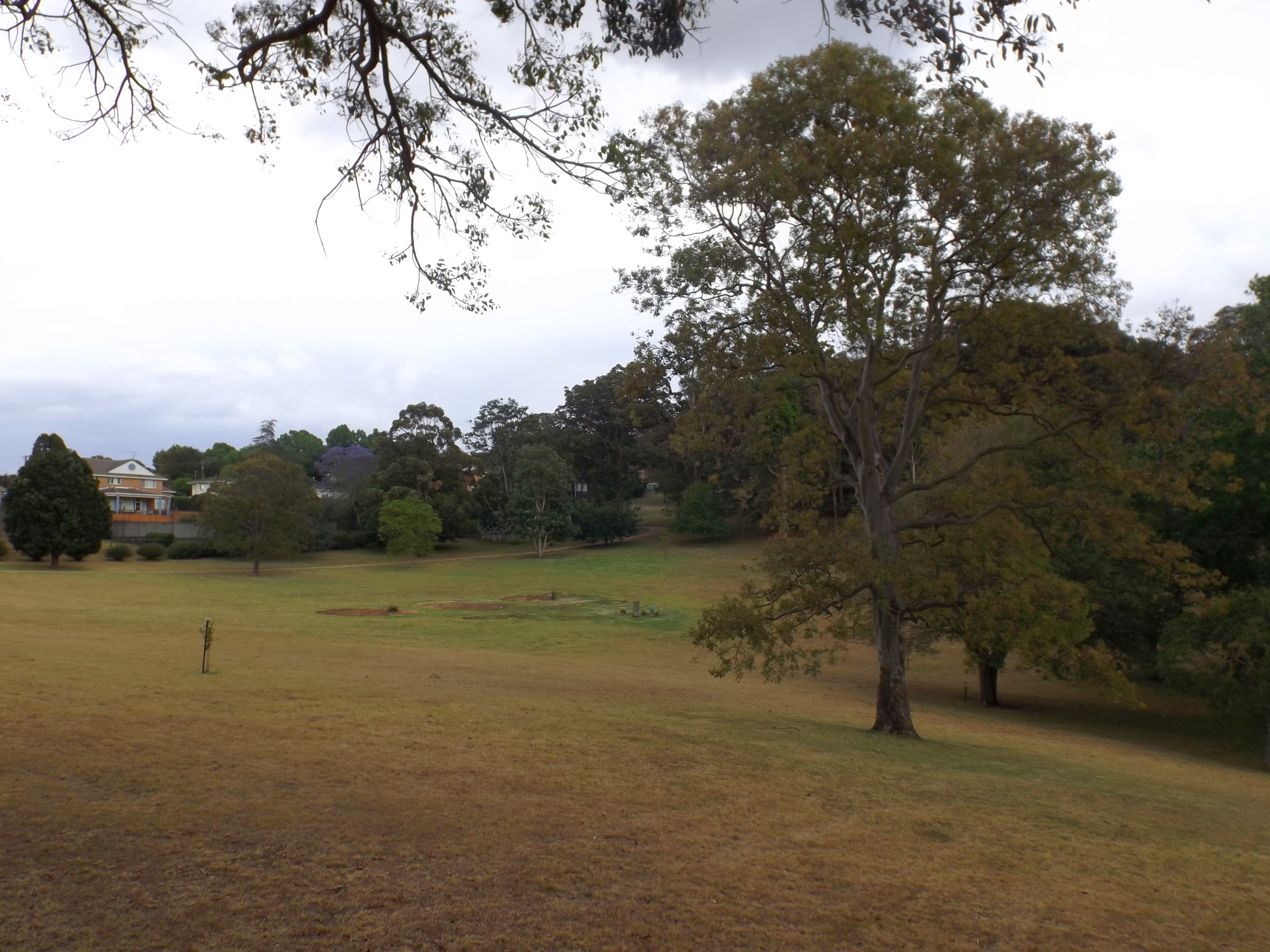
- Grassed area, 2014

- Location within Queensland Location within Australia
- 27.5469°S 151.9722°E
- Location: 6 Range Street, Mount Lofty, Toowoomba, Toowoomba Region, Queensland, Australia

History
- Design period: 1919–1930s (interwar period)
- Built: c. 1930–1950s

Queensland Heritage Register
- Official name: Boyce Gardens
- Type: state heritage (built, landscape)
- Designated: 25 January 2001
- Reference no.: 601311
- Significant period: 1930–1950s (fabric); 1930–1969 (historical)
- Significant components: garden/grounds, tennis court, trees – remnant scrub, trees/plantings, tank – reservoir, plaque, garden – ornamental/flower, terracing, mill – wind, wall/s – garden, orchard, residential accommodation – housing, swimming pool

Boyce Gardens is a heritage-listed garden and citrus farm at 6 Range Street, Mount Lofty, Toowoomba, Toowoomba Region, Queensland, Australia. It was built from c. 1930 to 1950s. It was added to the Queensland Heritage Register on 25 January 2001.

== History ==
Boyce Gardens was named for Leslie and Margaret Boyce, who established the garden following their arrival in Toowoomba after their wedding in April 1930. A number of extensions were added to the house in 1940 and in 1955. The tennis court was constructed in 1937 and a swimming pool was constructed in 1947.

Harriet Margaret Rose Hall, of Silver Spur in southern Queensland, purchased Portion 601 in 1929 The six hectares of land was located in an area that was, at the time, the north-eastern outskirts of Toowoomba. In the same year, Margaret became engaged to Leslie Atherton Gerard Boyce, a business executive at the Toowoomba Foundry (now Southern Cross Corporation). The land that Margaret had bought comprised a spur of eucalyptus woodland running south from Mt Lofty on its northern border, a section of natural rainforest and a run-down dairy farm, including one cultivated paddock. Portion 601 formed part of an area which was originally covered by a dense forest of Eucalypts and Scrub Box trees. The Eucalyptus forest originally covered most of the area on which Toowoomba stands. In the 19th century, the rainforest area was known as the Fairy Glen Scrub.

When Margaret Hall purchased Portion 601, all of the rainforest had been cleared east of Mackenzie Street. Margaret had designed the house site, drive and surrounding terraces, the spur was remoulded, every metre of top soil was removed, stored and later re-spread over the shaped terraces. The house was built and the Boyces moved in after their wedding on 29 April 1930. They lived and gardened on their property for the rest of their lives, and after their deaths (Margaret in 1984 and Leslie in 1988) their ashes were scattered in the garden.

Initially, the Boyces did not have it mind to restore the scrub. The house was constructed on higher ground on the side of Tick Hill (now known as Mt Lofty), looking east down towards what was then around four acres of scrub. Much of the timber had been cut out and stumps from eucalypts remained. Much of the natural vine scrub was heavily infested with lantana, blackberry and trees such as camphor laurel, celtis and Japanese laurel. The Boyces spent time in the mountain and rainforest country of south-east Queensland, including camping in the Canungra Valley and Lamington National Park. Following these visits, the Boyces made the decision to "restore, regenerate and preserve" the remnant rainforest on their property.

The garden commanded much of the Boyces' activity and much of their leisure time. At first, the lantana and blackberry was cleared, however, not wanting to make too many sudden gaps, not all the camphor laurels, celtis and other exotics were removed. Instead, they were ringbarked and poisoned and let to die where they had sprung up. Seedlings began to sprout, these were then pulled out to keep them from reinfesting the rainforest.

Upon beginning the restoration and preservation of the remnant rainforest, the Boyces had questions such as whether such a small area of native forest could maintain itself and whether or not to introduce new native species to the area. In all, around fifteen new species were introduced, all native to Queensland, though not present in the scrub when the Boyces purchased the property. Before the Boyces' time, most of the orchids, stag and elkhorns and tree ferns, as well as larger trees, had been milled.

After the exotics were removed a canopy of only about 12 metres (39 ft) remained. A plantation of hoop pines was established on the eastern border to provide initial protection and the Boyces began reintroducing indigenous trees, shrubs, vines and ferns, encouraging their growth with a built-in rain-like fine spray watering system, many years before such devices were common. Today the rainforest canopy is more than thirty metres high.

Over the years, they established a sunken garden (now the white garden), a terraced flower garden, a western walk and shrubbery, a walled garden, lawned terraces, rockeries and a fruit and vegetable garden. An avid "plantswoman", Margaret continually experimented with new species, trying dozens of varieties of daffodils and iris and many Liliums and rhododendrons, to establish which did and did not "do" in Toowoomba. Good records were kept and these experiments have proved to be of great value to Toowoomba gardeners. This is of significance, particularly as Toowoomba began to gain in importance as a noted "garden city". One important aspect of Toowoomba's garden city title was the annual Toowoomba Carnival of Flowers. In September 1949, a public meeting was held in the town hall to discuss the idea of a street carnival for the city. It was decided to hold an eight-day festival from 21 to 28 October 1950. The Carnival of Flowers has continued every year since 1950, making it Australia's longest running annual festival. Established in 1973 was the Toowoomba Chronicle Exhibition Gardens program. Since that time, the Exhibition Gardens have run every year, promoting a display of non-competitive every day gardens at Carnival time. The Boyce Gardens have been included in the Exhibition Gardens program as an example of an outstanding, beautifully prepared, private garden.

The Boyces also collected plants and gardening knowledge on numerous trips abroad. They pre-empted the vogue for South African proteas and leucadendrons, planting a grove of them near the tennis court after a trip to Africa in the early 1950s. They visited most of the great gardens of the world and Margaret read and indexed many gardening magazines, Australian and foreign, building up a formidable knowledge of plants and design.

In May 1969, the Boyces gave the estate to the University of Queensland in trust, to hold the land in perpetuity for educational purposes and to preserve and maintain the gardens and natural forest for use as a Botanic Garden and Natural Forest for the education of the public. In 1973, Leslie Boyce was awarded an Honorary Doctorate of Laws by the University of Queensland for his contribution to education. Until their deaths, the Boyces continued on as Curators of the property, which they also endowed to provide a perpetual maintenance fund.

The present intention and hope for the future is to continue the development of the garden, forest, wildflower garden and park as a pleasure and demonstration garden for the public and a tourist attraction in Toowoomba, the "Garden City".

== Description ==
Boyce Gardens comprises a number of major component parts. These include, the rainforest, located in the north-eastern corner of the site, the pine forest along Mackenzie Street on the eastern side of the property, the avocado orchard, displays of Australian flowering shrubs, tennis court, swimming pool, specialist garden areas including collections of ericas, proteas, roses, native orchids, camellias and azaleas, the walled garden, the compost pit, the house lawn, courtyard, rock gardens, the cut flower garden and the grassed areas to the south of the main garden.

These diverse component parts are woven into a composition which makes the excellent use of the changes in levels available on the sloping site and the canopy from the large remnant eucalyptus scattered across these slopes. The house is sited on the end of the dominant ridge in the property, offering an outlook to the garden from all aspects of the house. This position also establishes the house as a prominent visual reference point from a number of places within the garden.

Today the Fairy Glen Scrub, as it was known in the 19th century, is an isolated but healthy remnant of this type of environment on the edge of the Darling Downs. Approaching the property from Range Street the garden is shielded from view behind a screen of dense perimeter planting. As the driveway of the property is entered, the working parts of the garden can be seen. The water tank and windmill are essential for the life of the garden and sit within the garden layout and planting design.

The buildings fronting Jellicoe Street, the former gallery and external studies building, are not considered to be of cultural heritage significance.

=== Rainforest ===
The Rainforest fills the entire north-east corner, about two-fifths of the frontage to Range Street and all the frontage along Mackenzie Street. The rainforest contains only native trees, shrubs, climbers and ferns. There are several varieties of fig, Queensland Lace Bark and other Brachychitons, Lilli Pilli, Red Cedar, Deep Yellow Wood, Ribbon Wood, Hoop Pine, Silky Oak. There are also Birds Nest Ferns, tree ferns and many varieties of ground fern.

=== Avocado Orchard ===
On part of the property, sloping to the east between the tennis court and the western edge of the rainforest are planted a number of avocado trees. Planted in 1952, the trees are almost fifty years old. Also in this area are some citrus trees.

=== White Garden ===
A circular hollow was developed as the White Garden, and is located to the north of the property. This garden has creepers, treeferns, staghorns, camellias and hydrangeas. It can be viewed from the west from the Azalea and Espalier beds. The Rose Bed has also been established on the northern side of the property.

=== House ===
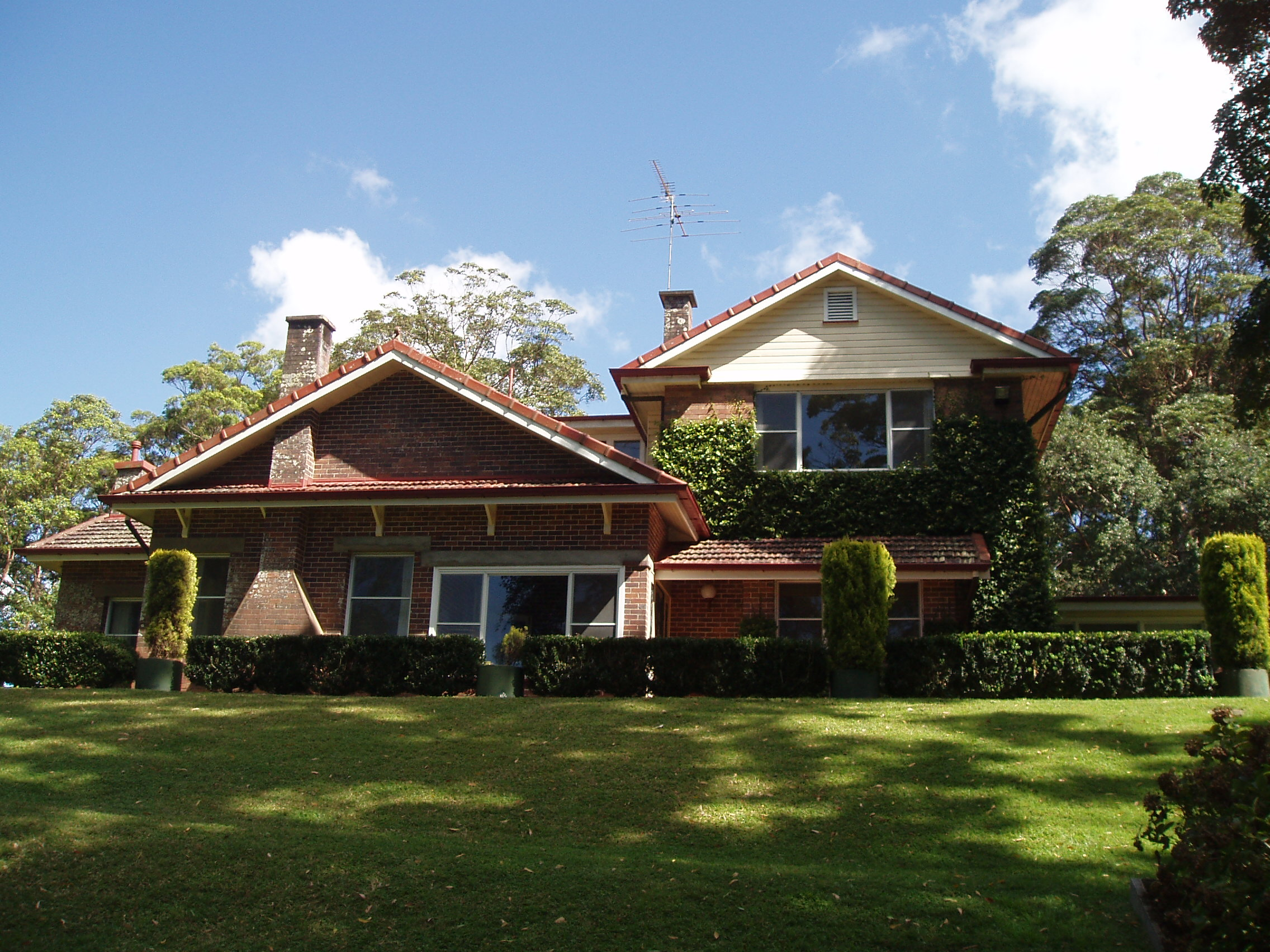
Boyces house facing ENE towards the rainforest.

The house is two story brick with bricked courtyard. The house was extended on several occasions, but retains many intact elements, including the timber dado panelling and plaster ceilings with decorative cornice and ceiling details. The internal staircase also has original decorative ironwork extant. Some of the rooms have original cedar joinery details, which have been painted over.

=== Walled Garden ===
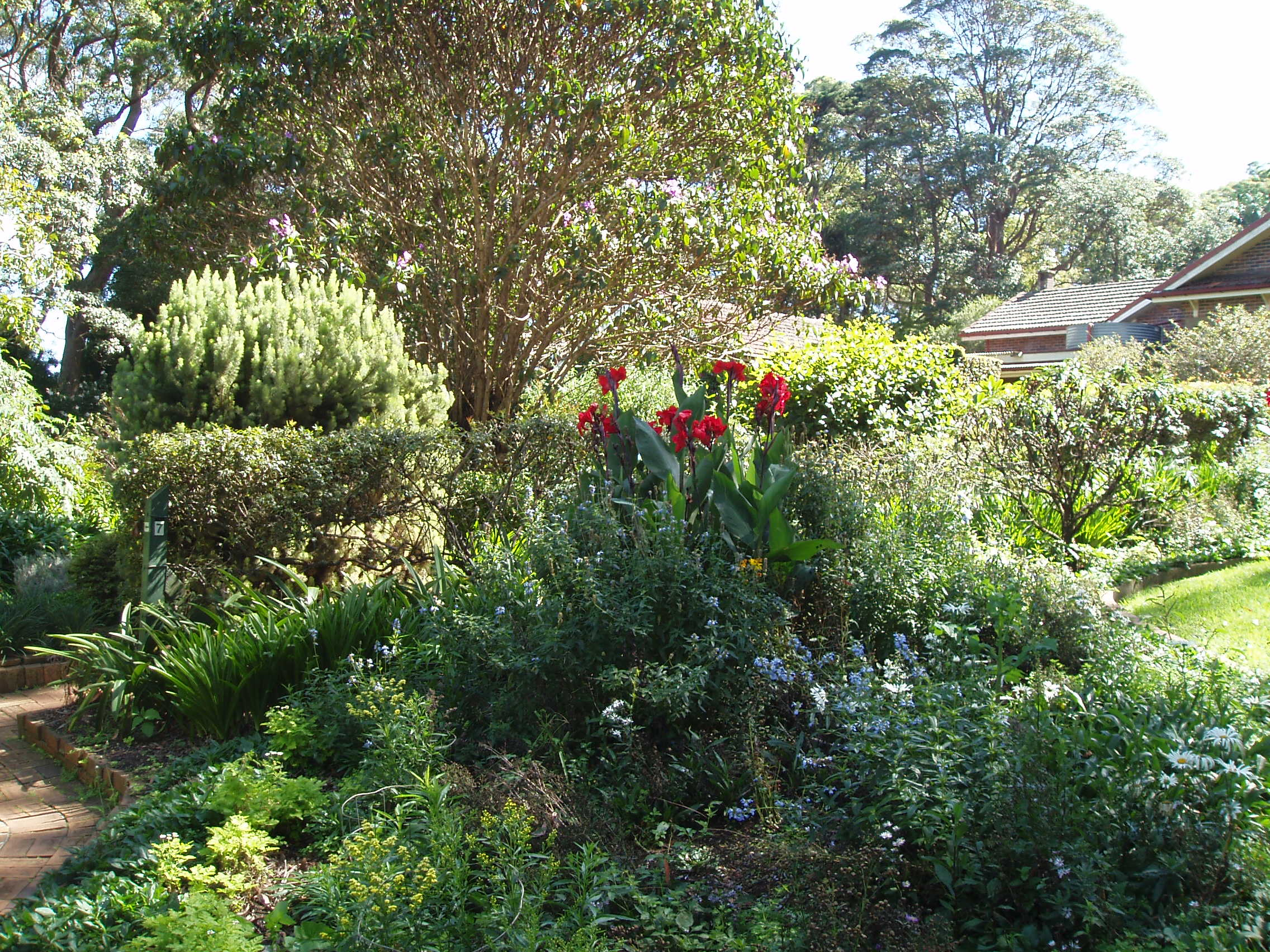
Boyce gardens - cottage garden and mixed border.

At the rear, or south, of the house is located the terraced cut flower area, cottage garden and walled garden, including an undulating brick wall, to the west of this section is the compost area, the site of the old vegetable garden and the windmill. Along the western border and shrubbery a mixed border has been planted including hibiscus, peaches, cherries, crab apple, wisteria, lavender, bella donna, spider, crinum, day lilies and daffodils.

=== Tennis Court and Swimming Pool ===
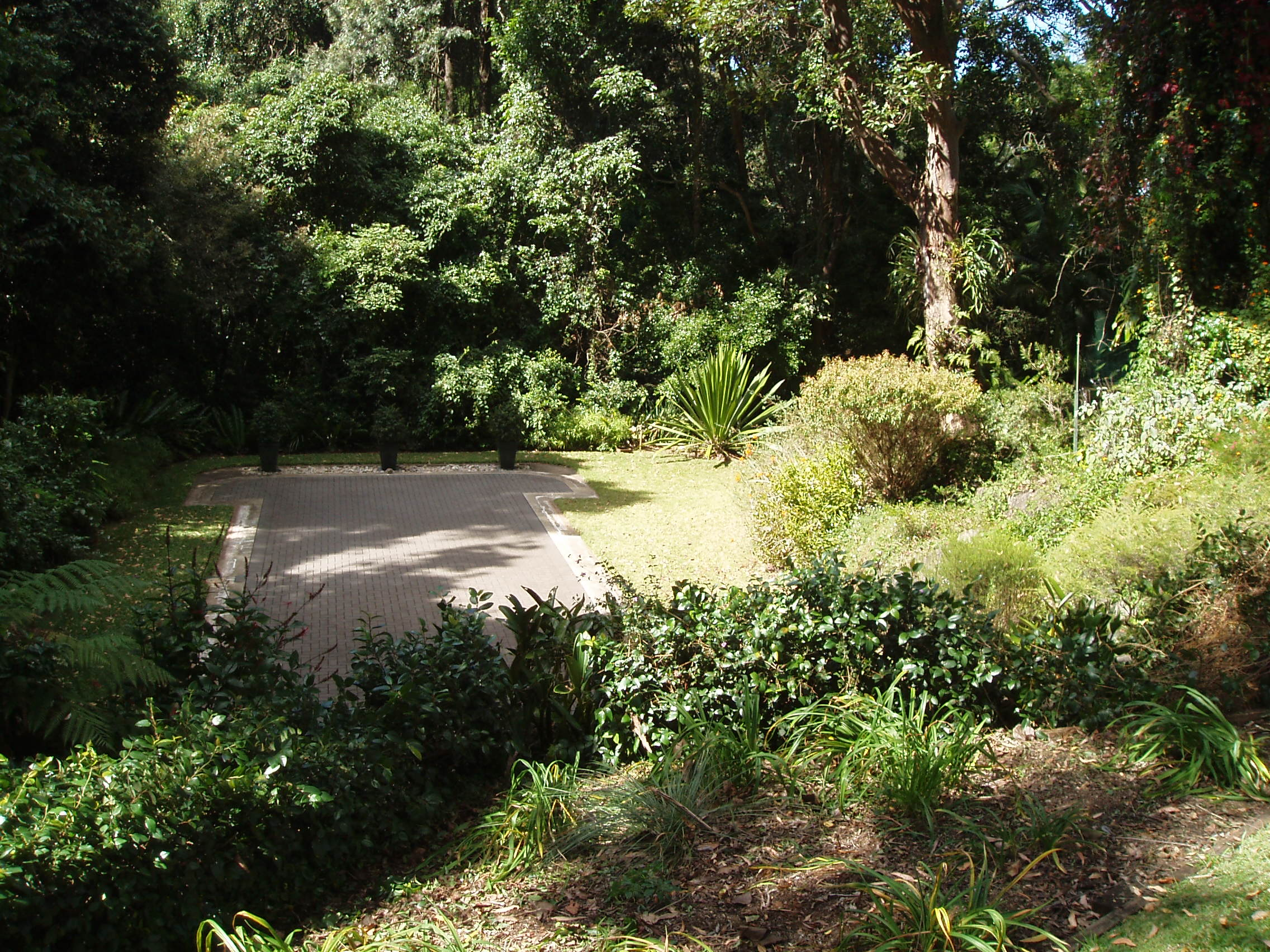
Boyce gardens - view of swimming pool (now filled in) and rainforest.

The tennis court is enclosed with netting, originally antbed, it is now grassed. The tennis court is flanked by a double row of Jacarandas to the east separating this area of the garden from the avocado orchard. On the east bank of the tennis court is a group of Doranthus, a giant red flowering native lily grown from a seed collected at Cunningham's Gap. To the north of the tennis court is the swimming pool where plaques in memory of Dr and Mrs Boyce have been placed.

A walking track has been established in the Gardens and takes into consideration the health and physical fitness of walkers. Visitors may stay on the upper, flatter route or, they may take the steeper route which takes the visitor through the rainforest, through the pine forest and up to the avocado orchard and terraced tennis court area. South across the open park are views to Jellicoe Street and the university buildings.

== Heritage listing ==
Boyce Gardens was listed on the Queensland Heritage Register on 25 January 2001 having satisfied the following criteria.

The place is important in demonstrating the evolution or pattern of Queensland's history.

Boyce Gardens is significant as it demonstrates early experimentations with the regeneration of endemic vegetation to a disturbed area. It is further significant as an intact example of a domestic residence from the 1930s sited in its original designed garden context and retaining the original curtilage of the garden. Boyce Gardens is also significant as an important garden within the city of Toowoomba, noted for its excellent gardens, well known throughout Queensland as the "Garden City". Boyce Gardens is significant as a record of gardening history in Queensland in its design form, species selection and experimentation, and in the accompanying documentation recording the progress of the growth of the garden since its establishment. Boyce Gardens is significant for the scientific value of an established and documented regenerated rainforest ecosystem and as a well-designed large garden open to the public for enjoyment and education. Over 100 species of trees, shrubs and vines and 25 species of ferns have been recorded in the rainforest. The Australian Garden History Society has recognised Boyce Gardens as one of paramount importance to the history of gardens in Queensland.

The place demonstrates rare, uncommon or endangered aspects of Queensland's cultural heritage.

Boyce Gardens remains an isolated pocket of rare but healthy remnant rainforest, including a 150-year-old strangler fig, on the corner of Range and Mackenzie Streets. The gardens are significant for their strong streetscape value and aesthetic contribution to the area.

The place is important because of its aesthetic significance.

With a pocket of remnant rainforest, including a 150-year-old strangler fig, on the corner of Range and Mackenzie Streets, Boyce Gardens is significant for its strong streetscape value and the aesthetic contribution of the site to the area.

The place has a strong or special association with a particular community or cultural group for social, cultural or spiritual reasons.

Boyce Gardens is significant for its association with Leslie and Margaret Boyce, prominent citizens of Toowoomba for over fifty years and for the many visitors who have viewed the gardens over the years.

The place has a special association with the life or work of a particular person, group or organisation of importance in Queensland's history.

Boyce Gardens is significant for its association with Leslie and Margaret Boyce, prominent citizens of Toowoomba for over fifty years and for the many visitors who have viewed the gardens over the years.
