= Brush Creek, Queensland =

Brush Creek
- Suburb
- Interactive map of Brush Creek
- Coordinates: 28.5872°S 151.1366°E
- Country: Australia
- State: Queensland
- LGA: Goondiwindi Region
- Location: 20.0 km (12.4 mi) S of Inglewood; 34.3 km (21.3 mi) N of Texas; 111 km (69 mi) E of Goondiwindi; 129 km (80 mi) SW of Warwick; 286 km (178 mi) SW of Brisbane
- Established: early 1850s

Government
  - State electorate: Southern Downs
  - Federal division: Maranoa

Area
  - Total: 392.0 km^{2} (151.4 sq mi)

Population
  - Total: 39 (2021 census)
  - Density: 0.0995/km^{2} (0.258/sq mi)
- Time zone: UTC+10:00 (AEST)
- Postcode: 4387
Suburbs around Brush Creek
Inglewood	Coolmunda	Coolmunda
Glenarbon	Brush Creek	Greenup
Beebo	Limevale	Greenup

Brush Creek is a rural locality in the Goondiwindi Region, Queensland, Australia. In the 2021 census, Brush Creek had a population of 39 people.

== Geography ==
The Inglewood – Texas Road enters the locality from the south (Limevale) and exits to the north-west (Inglewood).

The west of the locality is within the Yelarbon State Forest which extends into Glenarbon to the west and into Beebo to the north-east. Texas State Forest is in the south of the locality. Greenup State Forest is in the east of the locality. Apart from these protected areas, the land use is predominantly grazing on native vegetation.

== History ==
The locality was named after a pastoral run held in the early 1850s by Thomas Collins, which in turn was believed to be named for the creek flowing through the run.

Brush Creek was opened for selection on 17 April 1877; 21 square miles (54 km^{2}) were available.

The Brush Creek Provisional School open on 28 March 1927. In 1930 or 1932, it became a part-time provision school along with Greenup Provisional School and Waroo Road Provisional School. Brush Creek school closed in 1932.

== Demographics ==
In the 2016 census, Brush Creek had a population of 40 people.

In the 2021 census, Brush Creek had a population of 39 people.

== Education ==
There are no schools in Brush Creek. The nearest government primary and secondary schools are Inglewood State School (to Year 10) in neighbouring Inglewood to the north-west and Texas State School (to Year 10) in Texas to the south. There are no nearby schools offering education to Year 12. The alternatives are distance education and boarding school.
