= Limevale, Queensland =

Limevale
- Suburb
- Interactive map of Limevale
- Coordinates: 28.7405°S 151.1755°E
- Country: Australia
- State: Queensland
- LGA: Goondiwindi Region
- Location: 17.2 km (10.7 mi) N of Texas; 39.1 km (24.3 mi) S of Inglewood; 115 km (71 mi) ESE of Goondiwindi; 169 km (105 mi) SW of Toowoomba; 286 km (178 mi) SW of Brisbane

Government
  - State electorate: Southern Downs
  - Federal division: Maranoa

Area
  - Total: 203.6 km^{2} (78.6 sq mi)

Population
  - Total: 49 (2021 census)
  - Density: 0.2407/km^{2} (0.623/sq mi)
- Time zone: UTC+10:00 (AEST)
- Postcode: 4384
Suburbs around Limevale
Brush Creek	Brush Creek	Greenup
Beebo	Limevale	Silver Spur
Smithlea	Texas	Silver Spur

Limevale is a rural locality in the Goondiwindi Region, Queensland, Australia. In the 2021 census, Limevale had a population of 49 people.

== Geography ==
There are a number of mountains in the locality:

- Black Mountain (28.6858°S 151.2566°E)
- Browns Mountain (28.6863°S 151.2147°E)
- Pine Mountain (28.7294°S 151.2266°E)

Limevale Quarry is a limestone quarry at 28.7660°S 151.1873°E.

Texas State Forest 2 is in the north-west of the locality (28.6964°S 151.1069°E).

The Inglewood – Texas Road runs through from north to south.

== History ==
Limevale Provisional School opened on 31 January 1906. On 1 January 1909 it became Limevale State School. It closed on 2 June 1963. It was located on the Inglewood Texas Road at 28.7103°S 151.18882°E.

Magee's Creek Provisional School opened on 7 July 1913. In 1918 closed temporarily as it had no teacher. It closed permanently in December 1925.

St Paul's Anglican Church opened circa 1962. It closed circa 1990.

== Demographics ==
In the 2016 census, Limevale had a population of 64 people.

In the 2021 census, Limevale had a population of 49 people.

== Education ==
There are no schools in Limevale. The nearest government school is Texas State School in Texas to the south which offers Prep to Year 10 schooling. For Years 11 and 12 schooling, the nearest government schools are in Goodiwindi and Stanthorpe, both approximately 115 kilometres (71 mi) away, so distance education or boarding schools are alternatives.
