= Oman Ama, Queensland =

Oman Ama
- Suburb
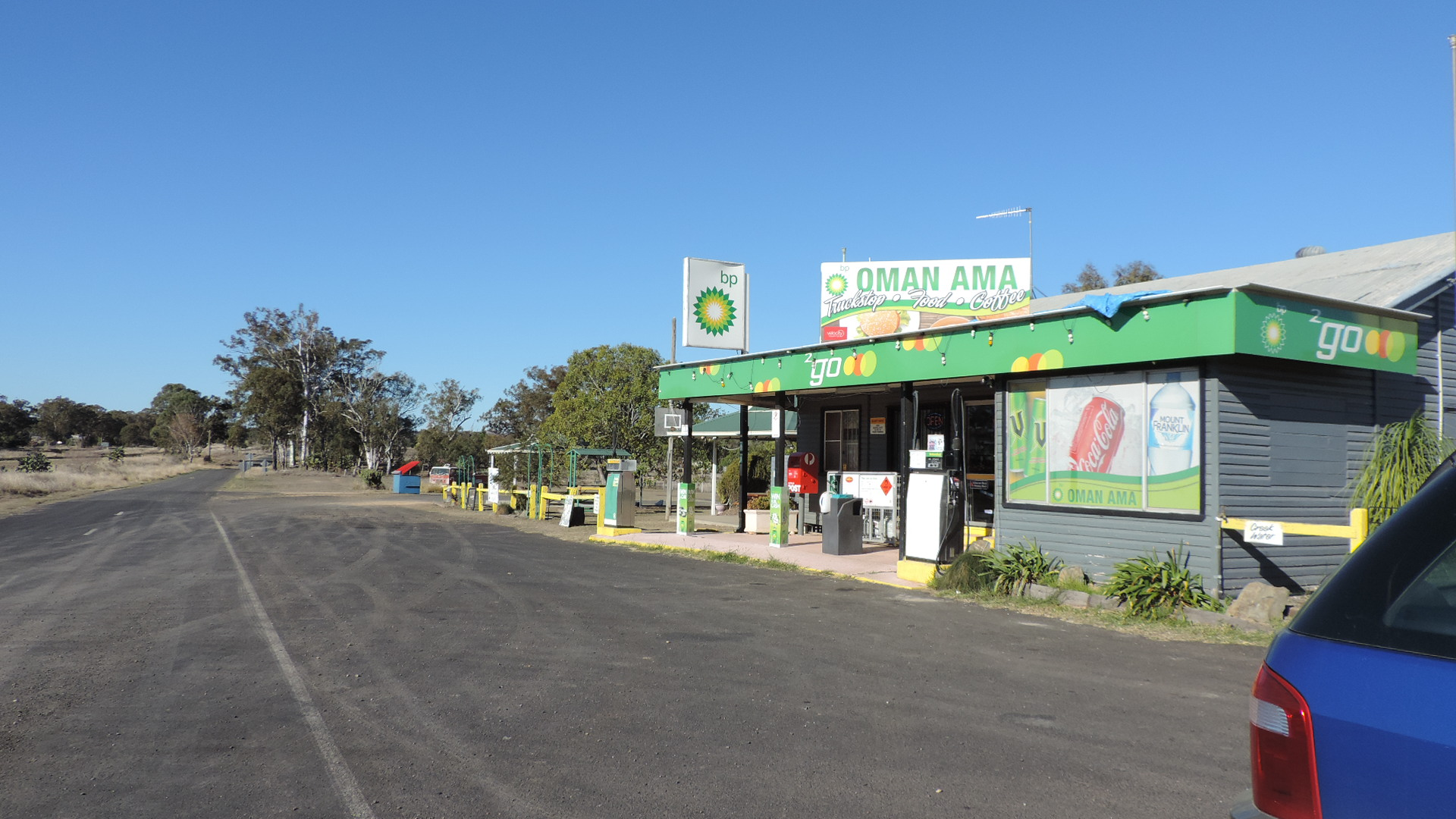
- BP Petrol Station, just south of the Cunningham Highway, 2019

- Interactive map of Oman Ama
- Coordinates: 28.42194°S 151.33528°E
- Country: Australia
- State: Queensland
- LGA: Goondiwindi Region
- Location: 26.6 km (16.5 mi) E of Inglewood; 85.5 km (53.1 mi) WSW of Warwick; 116 km (72 mi) E of Goondiwindi; 126 km (78 mi) SW of Toowoomba; 243 km (151 mi) SW of Brisbane

Government
  - State electorate: Southern Downs
  - Federal division: Maranoa

Area
  - Total: 182.8 km^{2} (70.6 sq mi)

Population
  - Total: 31 (2021 census)
  - Density: 0.1696/km^{2} (0.439/sq mi)
- Time zone: UTC+10:00 (AEST)
- Postcode: 4352
Suburbs around Oman Ama
Mosquito Creek	Gore	Gore
Coolmunda	Oman Ama	Terrica
Greenup	Warroo	Terrica

Oman Ama (sometimes written as Oman-ama and Omanama) is a rural locality in the Goondiwindi Region, Queensland, Australia. In the 2021 census, Oman Ama had a population of 31 people.

== Geography ==
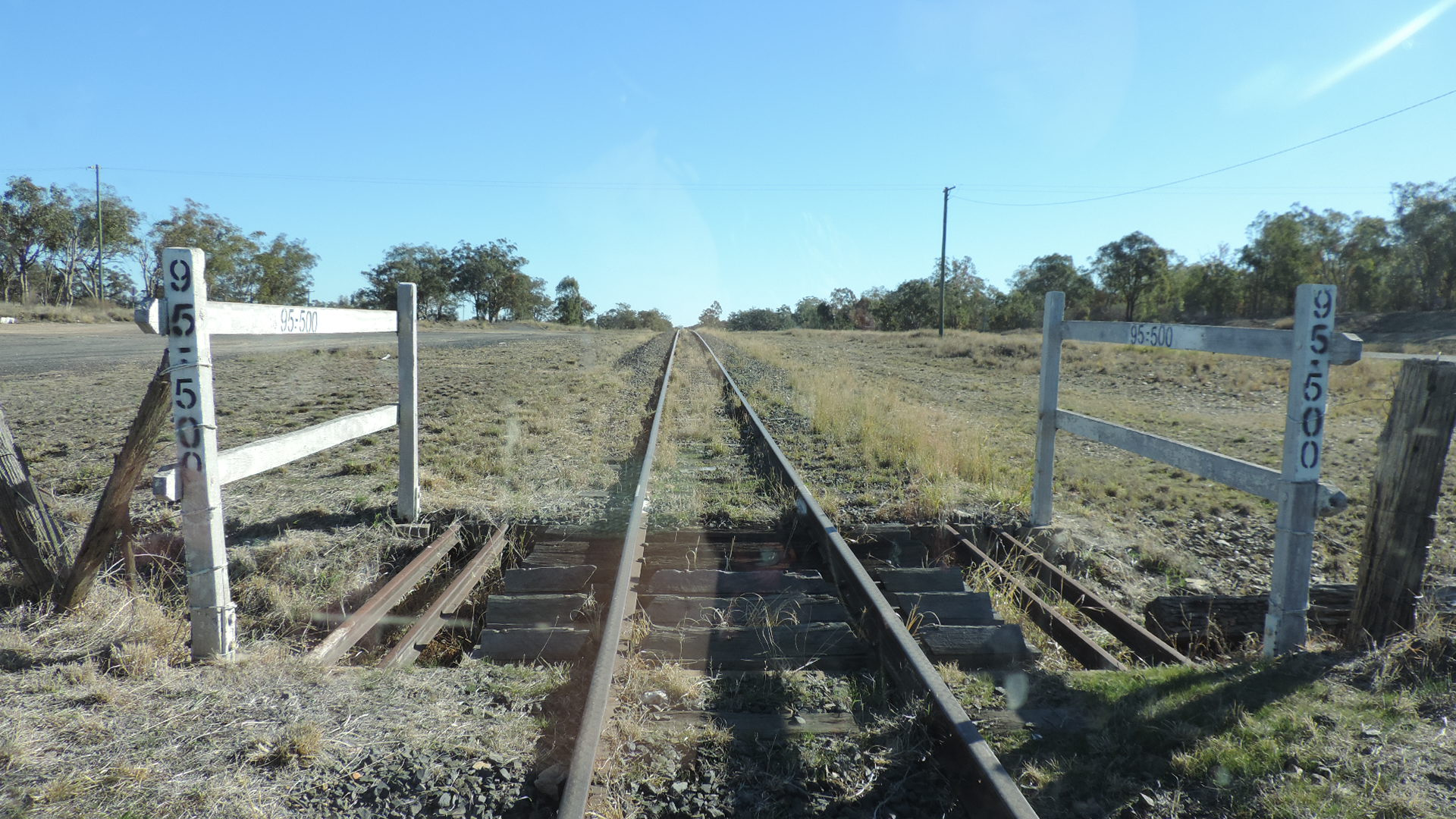
South Western railway line at Oman Ama, 2019

The Cunningham Highway passes through the locality from the north-east (Gore) to the west (Coolmunda). The South Western railway line runs loosely parallel and almost immediately south of the highway with the area being served by the Oman-ama railway station (28.3972°S 151.2931°E).

== History ==
The name Oman Ama is an Aboriginal name meaning "caught by the tail".

Brigalow Gully Provisional School opened circa 1896. On 1 January 1909 it became Brigalow Gully State School. In 1913, it was renamed Oman-ama State School. The school closed circa 1935. The school was located to the north of the Oman-ama railway station on the Cunningham Highway (28.3962°S 151.2958°E).

St David's Anglican Church was dedicated on 31 July 1905. It closed in 1972 but reopened on 28 July 1985. Its final closure on 30 July 2002 was approved by Assistant Bishop Nolan. In 2006, the church building was relocated to 330 Preston Boundary Road, Preston, where it is used as a wedding chapel.

In 2015-2016 Oman Ama was one of six communities being considered as Australia's first permanent nuclear waste disposal facility. The other sites were Sallys Flat (New South Wales), Hale (Northern Territory) and three sites in South Australia: Cortlinye, Pinkawillinie and Barndioota. While some residents were open to the idea, many were opposed.

== Demographics ==
In the 2016 census, Oman Ama had a population of 38 people.

In the 2021 census, Oman Ama had a population of 31 people.

== Education ==
There are no schools in Oman Ama. The nearest government school is Inglewood State School in Inglewood to the west which offers schooling from Prep to Year 10. Oman Ama is outside of any school district offering Years 11 and 12 schooling, the nearest being in Warwick to the north-east, Stanthorpe to the south-west and Goondiwindi to the west. Distance education or boarding school are other options.
