= Coolmunda Dam =

Dam in Queensland, Australia

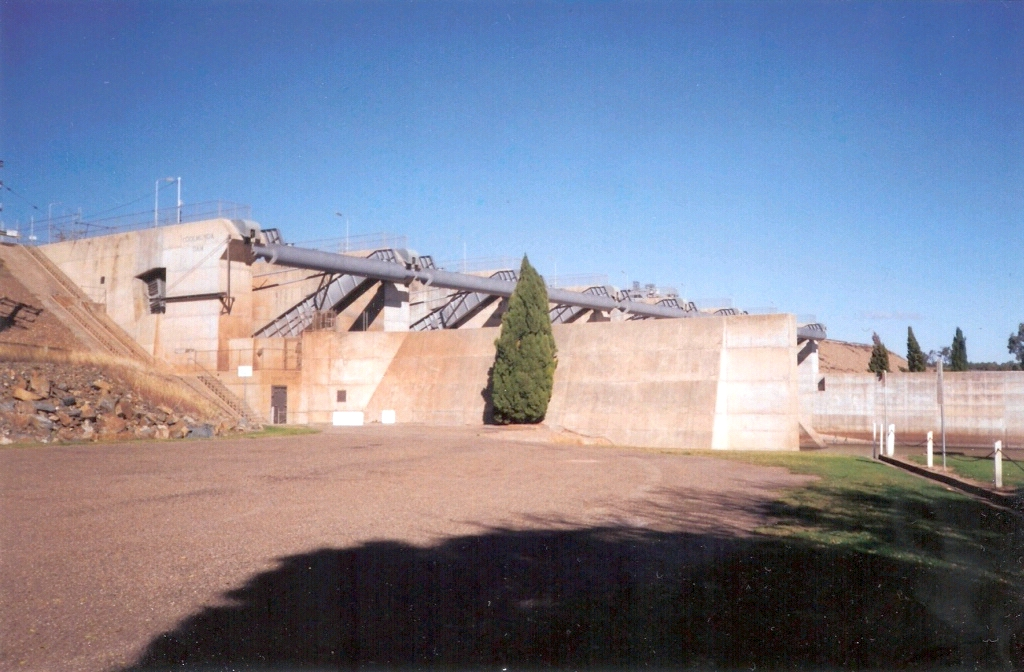
- The spillway and gates of Coolmunda Dam

- Location of the Coolmunda Dam in Queensland
- Country: Australia
- Location: Coolmunda, Goondiwindi Region
- Coordinates: 28°25′51″S 151°13′16″E
- Purpose: Potable water supply
- Status: Operational
- Opening date: 1968
- Operator: SunWater

Dam and spillways
- Type of dam: Earth fill dam
- Impounds: Macintyre Brook
- Height: 18.6 m (61 ft)
- Height (foundation): 16.1 m (53 ft)
- Length: 2,286 m (7,500 ft)
- Dam volume: 690×10^{3} m^{3} (24×10^{6} cu ft)
- Spillway type: Radial gated
- Spillway capacity: 6,860 m^{3}/s (242,000 cu ft/s)

Reservoir
- Creates: Lake Coolmunda
- Total capacity: 69,090 ML (15.20×10^{9} imp gal; 18.25×10^{9} US gal)
- Catchment area: 1,735 km^{2} (670 sq mi)
- Surface area: 1,645 ha (4,060 acres)
- Maximum length: 12 km (7.5 mi)
- Maximum width: 5.9 km (3.7 mi)
- Normal elevation: 314.07 m (1,030.4 ft) AHD

The Coolmunda Dam is an earth–fill embankment dam with a gated spillway across the Macintyre Brook, a tributary of the Dumaresq River, that is located on Darling Downs in Coolmunda, Goondiwindi Region, Queensland, Australia. The main purposes of the dam are for irrigation and potable water supply. The impounded reservoir is called the Lake Coolmunda.

== Location and features ==
The dam is approximately 13 km (8.1 mi) east of Inglewood, just off the Cunningham Highway. Two smaller creeks, Bracker Creek and Sandy Creek, also provide inflows to the reservoir.

Completed in 1968 the earth–fill dam structure is 18.6 metres (61 ft) high and 2,286 metres (7,500 ft) long. The 690-thousand-cubic-metre (24×10^{6} cu ft) dam wall holds back the 69,090-megalitre (15.20×10^{9} imp gal; 18.25×10^{9} US gal) reservoir when at full capacity. From a catchment area of 1,735 square kilometres (670 sq mi), the dam creates Lake Coolmunda at an elevation of 314.07 metres (1,030.4 ft) above sea level, with a surface area of 1,650 hectares (4,100 acres) at a maximum depth of 16.1 metres (53 ft) when at full capacity. The controlled spillway with radial gates has a discharge capacity of 6,860 cubic metres per second (242,000 cu ft/s). The dam is managed by SunWater.

== Recreational activities ==
There is one boat ramp, three picnic areas with good facilities as well as a caravan park. Free bush camping by the lake was once permitted. In 2013, a new camping area was opened to the public.

There are no boating restrictions in place. Parts of the lake contain stretches of standing timber and along the northern bank there are submerged fence posts the demark a former creek bed.

Eel-tailed catfish and spangled perch are found naturally in the lake's waters and the Lake Coolmunda Restocking Group Inc. stocks it with murray cod, silver perch and golden perch. The introduced species european carp has also been found in the lake. A stocked impoundment permit is required to fish in the dam.

== See also ==
- List of dams in Queensland
