= Texas railway line =

Former railway line in Queensland, Australia

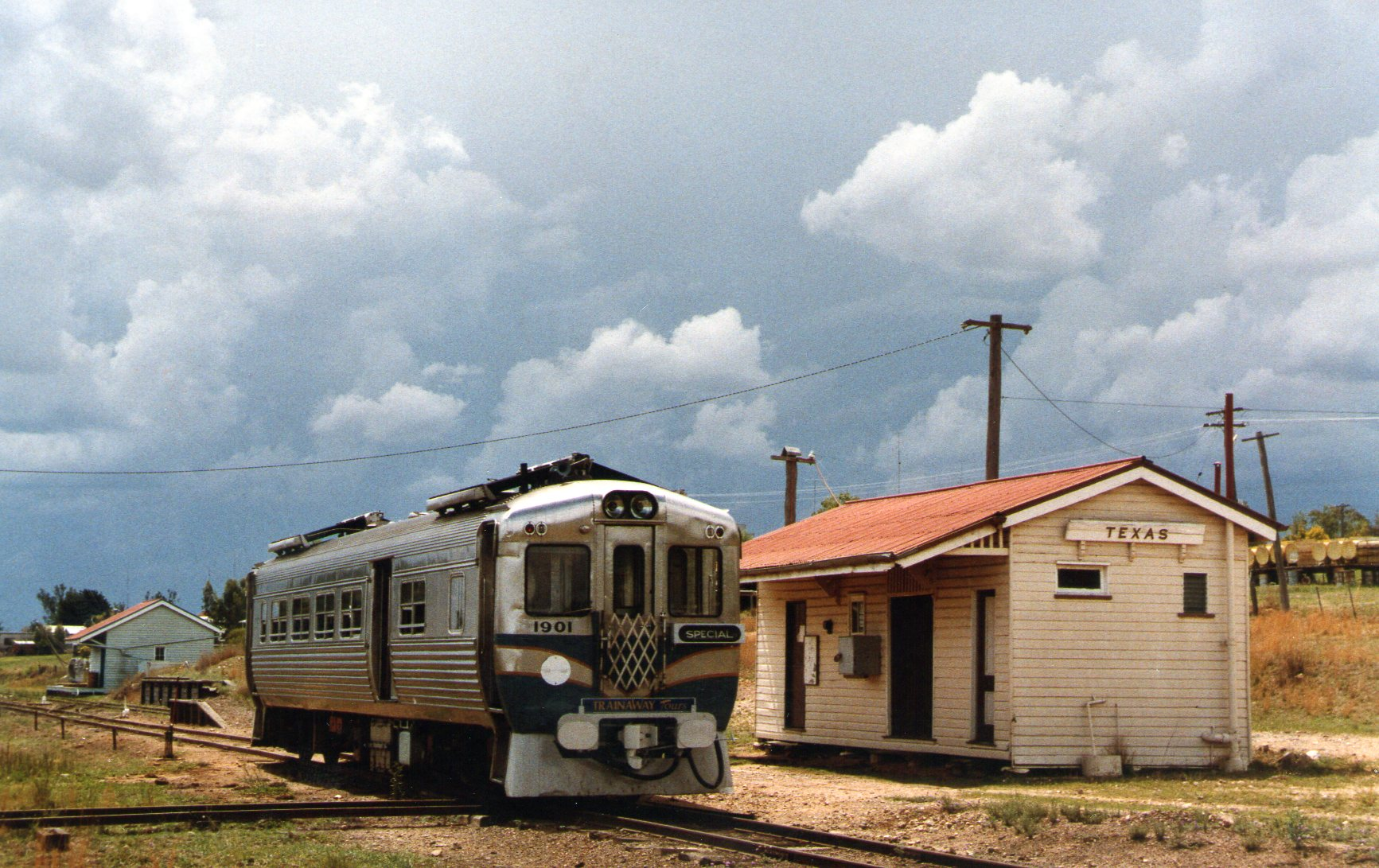
RM 1901 waits under looming skies at Texas station, Queensland, ~1991

The Texas railway line is a disused branch railway of the South Western railway line in the south of the Darling Downs region of Queensland, Australia, and was the last traditional branch line railway constructed in Queensland.

The McDougall brothers settled land in the Texas region in about 1840. They later had to prove their claim to the property after another settler moved in during their absence. At the time, the Republic of Texas in North America was in the midst of a land war with neighbouring Mexico and thus they called their property Texas station. Deposits of silver, lead and copper were mined at Silver Spur about 12 kilometres (7.5 mi) east of Texas. Tobacco was grown in the Texas region along with a busy trade in rabbit meat and skins.

Between October 1910 and March 1912, a road train serviced the area between Inglewood (a railhead on the South Western line), Texas and Silver Spur. In 1914, following an inefficient and unreliable service, a branch line was approved linking the three centres. Construction did not begin until February 1929 with the jobs created being sought by many hundreds of men out of work due to the Great Depression. The 55-kilometre (34 mi) section between Inglewood and Texas was officially opened on Monday 10 November 1930 by Godfrey Morgan, the Queensland Minister for Railways. Two small sidings appeared en route at Magee and Mundoey.

Grain, tobacco, dairy products and livestock were its main cargo but the line faced stiff competition with motor transport in the ascendancy. Closure of the Silver Spur mine sounded the death knell of an extension beyond Texas. Two trains a week connected with services at Inglewood. Although special trains ran during busy times, branch traffic was always sparse. Short branch lines ran from Texas station to livestock pens and past the Texas Freezing Works where rabbits were processed.

By 1963, passenger services had disappeared from the timetable. Regular services were withdrawn in 1985 and services were replaced by motor truck. The line closed on 1 January 1994 and is retained by Queensland Rail as a non-operational corridor. The track was left in place but other facilities were removed.

As at 2025, there is a proposal to reopen the line as a heritage tourist experience.

== See also ==
- Rail transport in Queensland
