= Glenarbon, Queensland =

Glenarbon
- Suburb
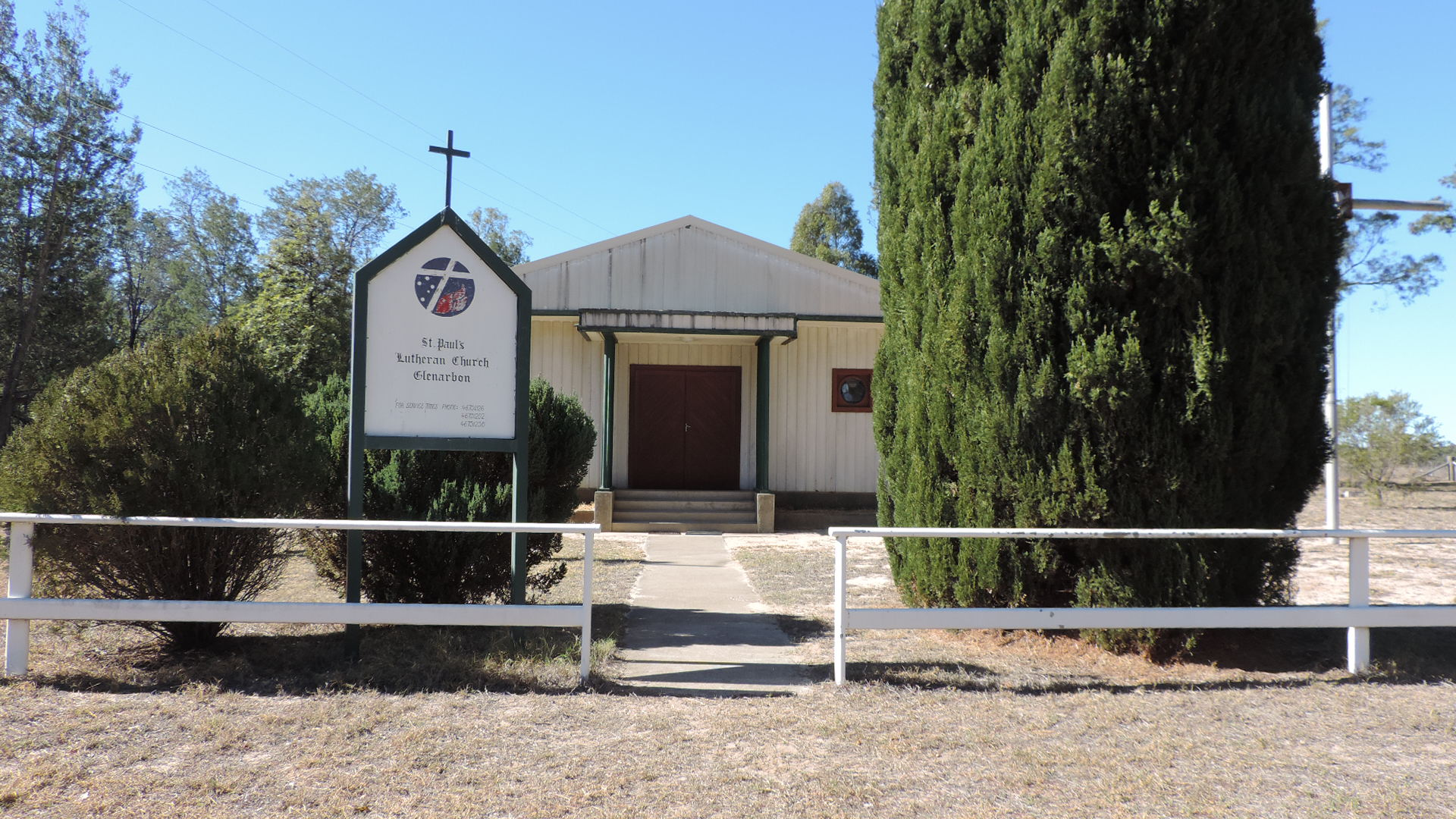
- St Paul's Lutheran Church, 2019

- Interactive map of Glenarbon
- Coordinates: 28.5977°S 150.9055°E
- Country: Australia
- State: Queensland
- LGA: Goondiwindi Region
- Location: 25.8 km (16.0 mi) SW of Inglewood; 56.3 km (35.0 mi) NW of Texas; 57.3 km (35.6 mi) E of Goondiwindi; 145 km (90 mi) WSW of Warwick; 302 km (188 mi) WSW of Brisbane

Government
  - State electorate: Southern Downs
  - Federal division: Maranoa

Area
  - Total: 291.3 km^{2} (112.5 sq mi)

Population
  - Total: 33 (2021 census)
  - Density: 0.1133/km^{2} (0.293/sq mi)
- Time zone: UTC+10:00 (AEST)
- Postcode: 4385
Suburbs around Glenarbon
Whetstone	Whetstone	Inglewood
Yelarbon	Glenarbon	Brush Creek
Twin Rivers (NSW)	Camp Creek (NSW)	Beebo

Glenarbon is a rural locality in the Goondiwindi Region, Queensland, Australia. It is on the border of Queensland and New South Wales. In the 2021 census, Glenarbon had a population of 33 people.

== Geography ==
The north-east and south-east of the locality is within the Yelarbon State Forest which extends into Beebo to the south-east and west and into Brush Creek to the east.

== History ==
Glenarbon Provision School opened on 17 March 1933, becoming Glenarbon State School in 1940. It closed 10 December 1982. The school was located just to the south of the Texas Yelarbon Road at 28.6835°S 150.8910°E within the present-day boundaries of Beebo.

St Paul's Lutheran Church was established circa December 1959.

== Demographics ==
In the 2016 census, Glenarbon had a population of 36 people.

In the 2021 census, Glenarbon had a population of 33 people.

== Education ==
There are no schools in Glenarbon. The nearest government primary schools are Yelarbon State School in neighbouring Yelarbon to the west and Inglewood State School in Inglewood to the north-east. The nearest government secondary schools are Inglewood State School (to Year 10) and Texas State School (to Year 10) in Texas to the south-east. Goondiwindi State High School in Goondiwindi to the west provides secondary schooling to Year 12, but may be too distant for a daily commute for students in Glenarbon; alternatives are distance education and boarding schools.

== Amenities ==
The former school site is now a recreational reserve operated by the Goondiwindi Regional Council.

St Paul's Lutheran Church is on Glenarbon Church Road at 28.6783°S 150.8919°E, which is also now within Beebo. The church has a small cemetery.
