= Coolmunda, Queensland =

Coolmunda
- Suburb
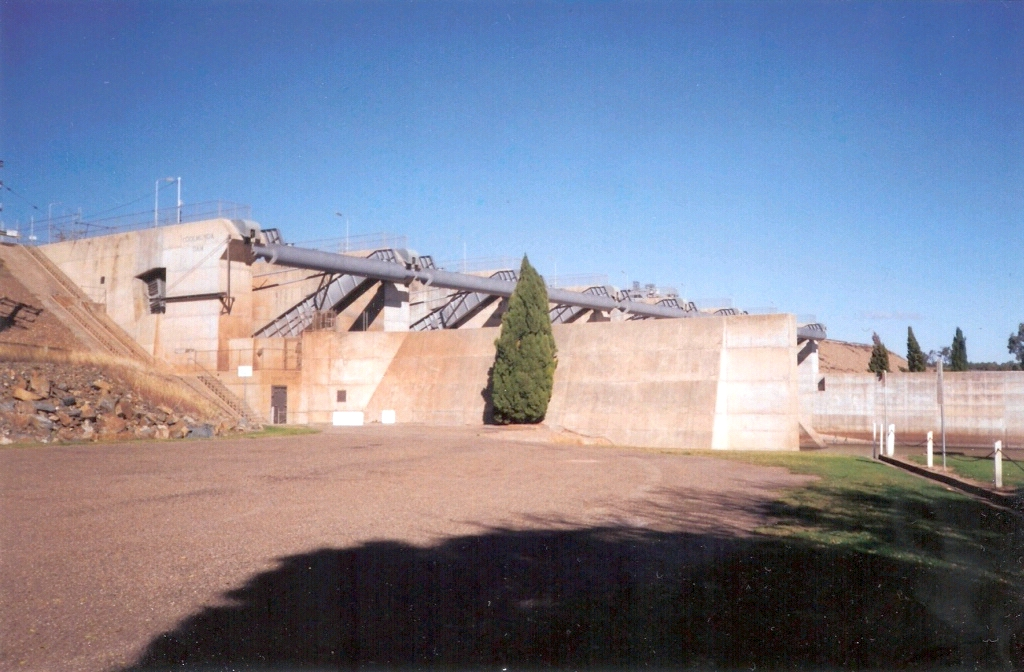
- Lake Coolmunda provides water for Inglewood and irrigators as far downstream as Goondiwindi

- Interactive map of Coolmunda
- Coordinates: 28.4380°S 151.2322°E
- Country: Australia
- State: Queensland
- LGA: Goondiwindi Region
- Location: 12.9 km (8.0 mi) E of Inglewood; 95.8 km (59.5 mi) WSW of Warwick; 104 km (65 mi) E of Goondiwindi; 136 km (85 mi) SW of Toowoomba; 254 km (158 mi) SW of Brisbane

Government
  - State electorate: Southern Downs
  - Federal division: Maranoa

Area
  - Total: 238.0 km^{2} (91.9 sq mi)

Population
  - Total: 212 (2021 census)
  - Density: 0.8908/km^{2} (2.307/sq mi)
- Time zone: UTC+10:00 (AEST)
- Postcode: 4387
Suburbs around Coolmunda
| Inglewood | Mosquito Creek | Mosquito Creek |
| Inglewood | Coolmunda | Oman Ama |
| Brush Creek | Brush Creek | Greenup |

Coolmunda is a rural locality in the Goondiwindi Region, Queensland, Australia. In the 2021 census, Coolmunda had a population of 212 people.

== Geography ==
The Cunningham Highway and South Western railway line pass through the locality from east (Oman Ama) to west (Inglewood). The locality is served by the Cobba-Da-Mana railway station (28.4077°S 151.2236°E).

Coolmunda includes the neighbourhood of Cobba-Da-Mana around the Cobba-Da-Mana railway station.

To the south of the highway and railway, Lake Coolmunda is a reservoir (28.45°S 151.2333°E) created by Coolmunda Dam (28.4369°S 151.2175°E) impounding the Macintrye Brook. It has a capacity of 69,000 megalitres (2,400×10^{6} cu ft).

The Coolmunda Conservation Park (28.4594°S 151.2080°E) is to the south-west of the lake. The park seeks to protect the endangered Leucopogon sp (Coolmunda D.Halford Q1635) and the vulnerable Eucalyptus virens (shiny-leaved ironbark).

The land use is a mixture of dry and irrigated cropping and grazing on native vegetation.

== History ==
The name Coolmunda is thought to be an Aboriginal word, meaning a stream with a sandy bed.

Coolmunda Provisional School opened 20 October 1883 but closed on 27 March 1885. It reopened in about March 1900 and became Coolmunda State School from 1 January 1909. In 1914 the school's name was changed to Waroo Road State School. The school closed in 1922, but reopened again in 1923 as a half-time school sharing a teacher with the Greenup Provisional School, but closed again in 1927. It recommenced in 1929 as a part-time school sharing a teacher with Greenup and Brush Creek Provisional School, closing in 1930. It was located to the south of the Cunningham Highway where the highway and railway line diverge (28.4157°S 151.1634°E).

In May 1912 the Queensland Government auctioned 26 town allotments in the Town of Cobba-Da-Mana.

The South Western railway opened from Thane to Inglewood on 8 July 1907, with the locality being served by the now-abandoned Coolmunda railway station (28.4148°S 151.1481°E) and Cobba-Da-Mana railway station.

Nanny Creek Provisional School opened in 1911 and closed circa 1913.

Cobba-Da-Mana State School opened on 22 January 1912 and closed in 1965. It was just south-west of the Cobba-Da-Mana railway station, approximately 28.4076°S 151.21960°E.

On 15 August 1932, a new Coolmunda State School was established which operated until 1943.

== Demographics ==
In the 2016 census, Coolmunda had a population of 141 people.

In the 2021 census, Coolmunda had a population of 212 people.

== Education ==
There are no schools in Coolmunda. The nearest government school is Inglewood State School (to Year 10) in neighbouring Inglewood to the west. There is no nearby school offering secondary education to Year 12; the options are distance education and boarding school.

== Amenities ==
Bracker Creek Rural Fire Station is at 1782 Tobacco Road (28.4786°S 151.2128°E).

== Attractions ==
The Coolamunda Dam offers fishing for a variety of stocked and local species; a Stocked Impoundment Permit is required. There is a boat ramp at 28.4240°S 151.2173°E.
