= Silver Spur, Queensland =

Silver Spur
- Town
- Interactive map of Silver Spur
- Coordinates: 28.8636°S 151.2744°E
- Country: Australia
- State: Queensland
- LGA: Goondiwindi Region
- Location: 27.8 km (17.3 mi) ENE of Texas; 65.8 km (40.9 mi) WSW of Stanthorpe; 125 km (78 mi) SW of Warwick; 159 km (99 mi) ESE of Goondiwindi; 283 km (176 mi) SW of Brisbane

Government
  - State electorate: Southern Downs
  - Federal division: Maranoa

Area
  - Total: 370.0 km^{2} (142.9 sq mi)

Population
  - Total: 94 (2021 census locality)
  - Density: 0.2541/km^{2} (0.658/sq mi)
- Time zone: UTC+10:00 (AEST)
- Postcode: 4385
Localities around Silver Spur
| Limevale | Greenup | Warroo |
| Texas | Silver Spur | Glenlyon |
| Bonshaw (NSW) | Bonshaw | Glenlyon |

Silver Spur (also written as Silverspur) is a rural town and locality in the Goondiwindi Region, Queensland, Australia. It is on the border of Queensland and New South Wales. In the 2021 census, the locality of Silver Spur had a population of 94 people.

== History ==
Silverspur Provisional School opened on 27 May 1895. On 1 November 1912 it became Silverspur State School. It closed in 1960. It was on the Stanthorpe – Texas Road on the corner of Hilton Street (28.8629°S 151.2757°E).

St Mary Magdalene's Anglican Church was dedicated on 19 August 1932 by the Archbishop of Brisbane Gerald Sharp. It was on the Stanthorpe Texas Road. It closed circa 1966.

== Demographics ==
In the 2016 census, the locality of Silver Spur had a population of 72 people.

In the 2021 census, the locality of Silver Spur had a population of 94 people.

== Education ==
There are no schools in Silver Spur. The nearest government school is Texas State School (Prep to Year 10) in neighbouring Texas to the west. There are no secondary schools providing secondary education to Year 12 nearby. The alternatives are distance education and boarding school.

== Facilities ==
There is a cemetery at the end of Spooners Road off Waverley Lane (28.8489°S 151.2484°E) operated by the Goondiwindi Regional Council.
