= Texas, Queensland =

Town in Queensland, Australia

Texas
- Town
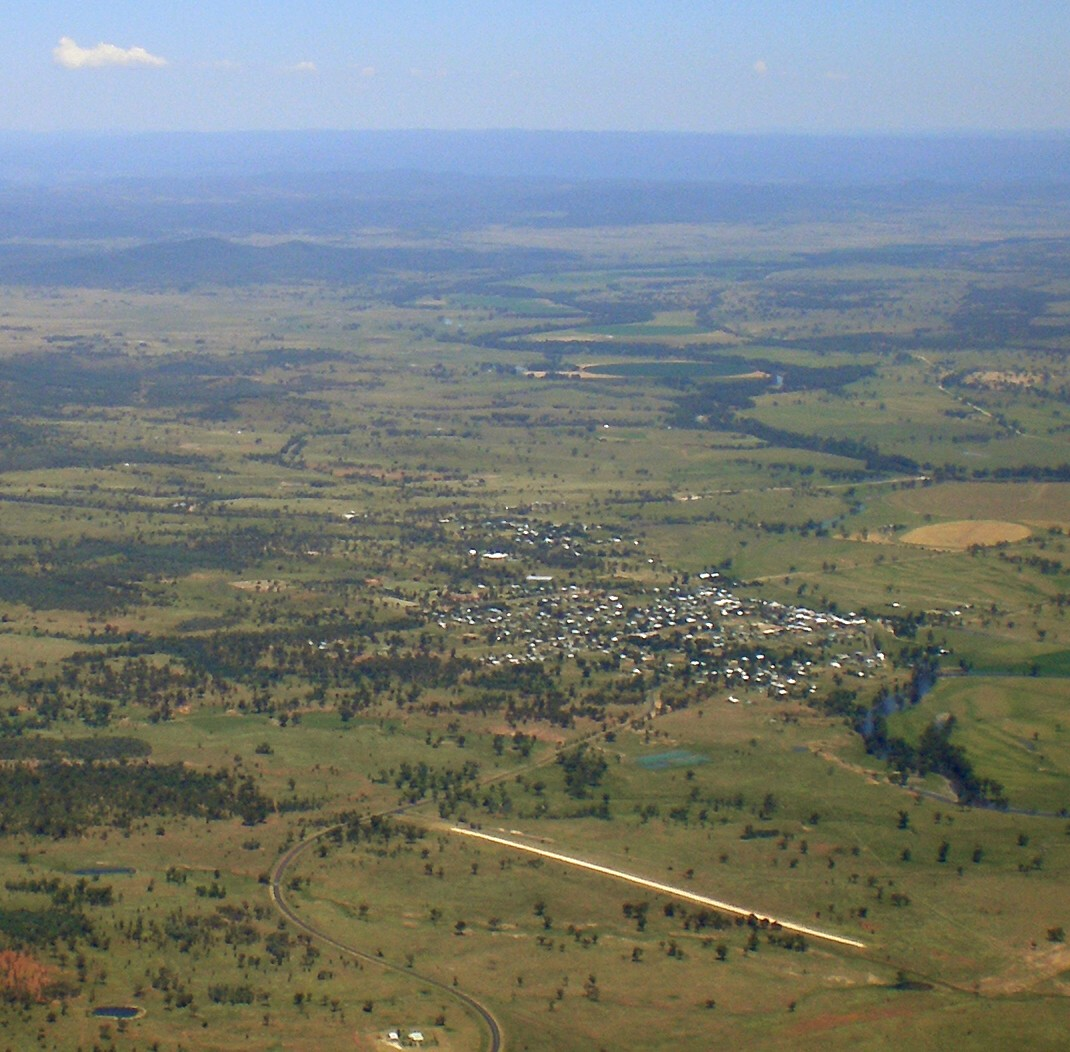
- Aerial view of Texas, looking south with the aerodrome runway in the foreground, 2010

- Interactive map of Texas
- Coordinates: 28.8586°S 151.1655°E
- Country: Australia
- State: Queensland
- LGA: Goondiwindi Region
- Location: 54.5 km (33.9 mi) S of Inglewood; 98.9 km (61.5 mi) SE of Stanthorpe; 113 km (70 mi) SE of Goondiwindi; 304 km (189 mi) SW of Brisbane
- Established: 1840s

Government
  - State electorate: Southern Downs
  - Federal division: Maranoa

Area
  - Total: 104.8 km^{2} (40.5 sq mi)
- Elevation: 297 m (974 ft)

Population
  - Total: 790 (2021 census)
  - Density: 7.54/km^{2} (19.52/sq mi)
- Time zone: UTC+10:00 (AEST)
- Postcode: 4385
- Mean max temp: 26.9 °C (80.4 °F)
- Mean min temp: 11.3 °C (52.3 °F)
- Annual rainfall: 659.1 mm (25.95 in)
Localities around Texas
Smithlea	Limevale	Silver Spur
Texas (NSW)	Texas	Silver Spur
Texas (NSW)	Bonshaw (NSW)	Silver Spur

Texas is a rural town and locality in the Goondiwindi Region of Queensland, Australia. It is on the Queensland border with New South Wales. In the 2021 census, the locality of Texas had a population of 790 people.

== History ==
Bigambul (also known as Bigambal, Bigumbil, Pikambul, Pikumbul) is an Australian Aboriginal language spoken by the Bigambul people. The Bigambul language region includes the landscape within the local government boundaries of the Goondiwindi Regional Council, including the towns of Goondiwindi, Yelarbon and Texas extending north towards Moonie and Millmerran.

Texas sits on Bigambul land, the Indigenous people of the region who inhabited the area for thousands of years prior to colonisation in the 1840s.

Texas, at one time, relied on its importance of grazing. It was settled in 1842 and was named after the largest nearby landholding in the area, known as Texas Station.

The origin of the town's name is generally regarded as a reference to a territorial dispute. The land in the area was first settled by the McDougall brothers, who found squatters there on returning from the goldfields. Once their legal right to the land was recognised, they named their property in honour of the dispute between the United States and Mexico over territory in Texas.

Texas Provisional School opened on 1 March 1887. On 1 January 1900, it became Texas State School.

Land in Texas was open for selection on 17 April 1877; 140 square miles (360 km^{2}) were available.

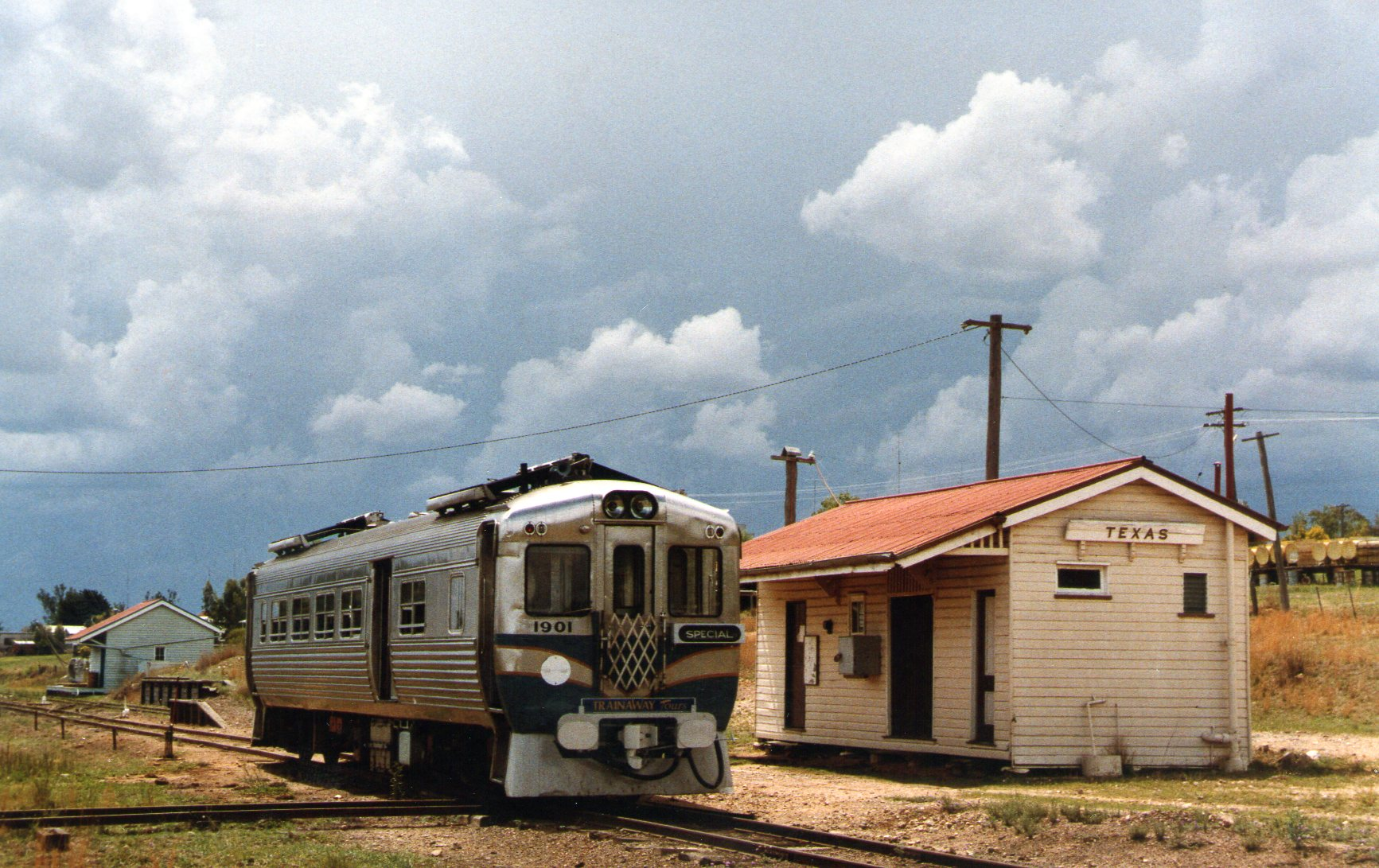
RM 1901 at Texas railway station, circa 1991

Texas was connected by the Texas railway line from Inglewood in November 1930 with the town being served by the Texas railway station (28.8568°S 151.1722°E). The line was closed in 1994, but officially remains operational. However, the station is officially abandoned.

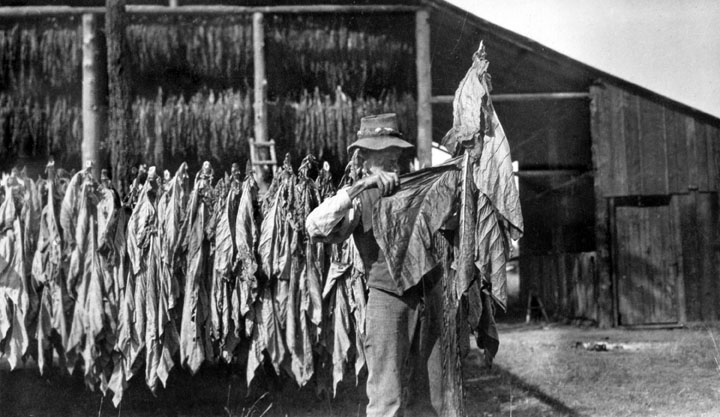
Drying tobacco, Texas, circa 1930

Up until about 1986, tobacco farming was an important industry in the area and many Italian families settled the area to run and work the tobacco farms. The tobacco industry had begun to be important in the late 1800s. In the 1870s, Chinese workers began to be employed on the Texas Station to grow the crop for local use. "They were employed because they had grown their own tobacco before, so you use somebody who can already grow something instead of reinventing the wheel," local historian Robyn Griffin explained. "Smoking had become quite fashionable, and they would've also sold some of it to manufacturers." Later, during the 1900s, much of the region's tobacco was grown in the Dumaresq Valley beside the Dumaresq River.

The current Texas Library was opened in 2010 with minor refurbishment in 2011.

== Demographics ==
In the 2006 census, the town of Texas had a population of 693 people.

In the 2011 census, the locality of Texas and nearby areas had a population of 1,159 people.

In the 2016 census, the locality of Texas had a population of 843 people.

In the 2021 census, the locality of Texas had a population of 790 people.

== Geography ==
The town is located just 2 kilometres (1.2 mi) from Queensland's southern border with New South Wales, close to Bonshaw, New South Wales. The locality across the New South Wales border is also known as Texas, having a shared history as being part of the Texas pastoral run.

State Route 89, a road with two names, runs through the locality, entering from the east as Stanthorpe – Texas Road (Mingoola Road, Fleming Street and High Street in the town) and exiting to the north-west as Inglewood – Texas Road (Greenup Street).

Texas has the following mountains:

- Texas Mount (28.8554°S 151.2108°E) 501 metres (1,644 ft)
- The Blacks Rock (28.9669°S 151.1429°E)

Texas Aerodrome is on the Texas-Yelarbon Road, north-west of the town (28.8345°S 151.1527°E). The runway is approx 830 by 15 metres (2,723 by 49 ft) of graded gravel. It is operated by the Goondiwindi Regional Council.

== Climate ==
Climate data for Texas, QLD
Month	Jan	Feb	Mar	Apr	May	Jun	Jul	Aug	Sep	Oct	Nov	Dec	Year
Record high °C (°F)	44.6 (112.3)	44.5 (112.1)	40.1 (104.2)	36.1 (97.0)	31.8 (89.2)	27.8 (82.0)	26.6 (79.9)	35.0 (95.0)	36.7 (98.1)	39.8 (103.6)	43.2 (109.8)	43.5 (110.3)	44.6 (112.3)
Mean daily maximum °C (°F)	33.9 (93.0)	32.8 (91.0)	31.2 (88.2)	27.4 (81.3)	22.9 (73.2)	19.4 (66.9)	18.9 (66.0)	21.0 (69.8)	24.6 (76.3)	28.1 (82.6)	30.6 (87.1)	32.9 (91.2)	27.0 (80.6)
Mean daily minimum °C (°F)	18.8 (65.8)	18.4 (65.1)	16.2 (61.2)	12.0 (53.6)	8.1 (46.6)	4.7 (40.5)	3.8 (38.8)	4.7 (40.5)	8.0 (46.4)	11.9 (53.4)	15.1 (59.2)	17.4 (63.3)	11.6 (52.9)
Record low °C (°F)	10.2 (50.4)	8.8 (47.8)	4.9 (40.8)	−0.4 (31.3)	−2.9 (26.8)	−7.6 (18.3)	−6.6 (20.1)	−5.2 (22.6)	−2.6 (27.3)	−2.1 (28.2)	2.8 (37.0)	6.2 (43.2)	−7.6 (18.3)
Average rainfall mm (inches)	88.4 (3.48)	75.1 (2.96)	58.7 (2.31)	34.5 (1.36)	39.6 (1.56)	40.1 (1.58)	41.0 (1.61)	33.7 (1.33)	39.8 (1.57)	60.5 (2.38)	67.5 (2.66)	80.6 (3.17)	659.5 (25.97)
Average rainy days (≥ 0.2mm)	7.4	6.3	5.6	3.8	4.5	5.7	6.0	5.3	5.0	6.7	7.1	7.9	71.3
Source: Bureau of Meteorology

== Economy ==
Farming is the dominant industry in the Texas region, although there is also a silver mine. The Whyalla Beef feedlot is located about 25 km from the town.

Part of the Goondiwindi Region, Texas is administered from the nearby larger town of Goondiwindi.

As of 2022, Texas is serviced by three petrol stations. All 3 stations provide diesel fuel.

== Education ==
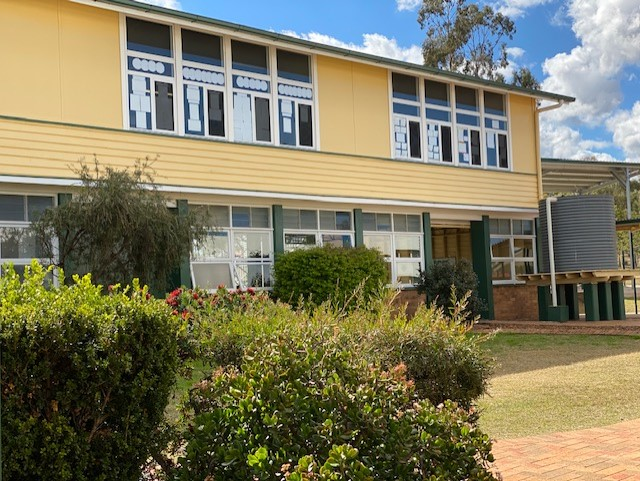
Block B and grounds, Texas State School, circa 2022

Texas State School is a government primary and secondary (Early Childhood to Year 10) school for boys and girls at 1 Flemming Street (28.8506°S 151.1742°E). In 2018, the school had an enrolment of 160 students with 16 teachers (15 full-time equivalent) and 16 non-teaching staff (9 full-time equivalent). It includes a special education program.

There are no schools offering education to Year 12 in or near Texas (the nearest being in Stanthorpe and Goondiwindi). Distance education and boarding schools are the alternatives.

== Amenities ==
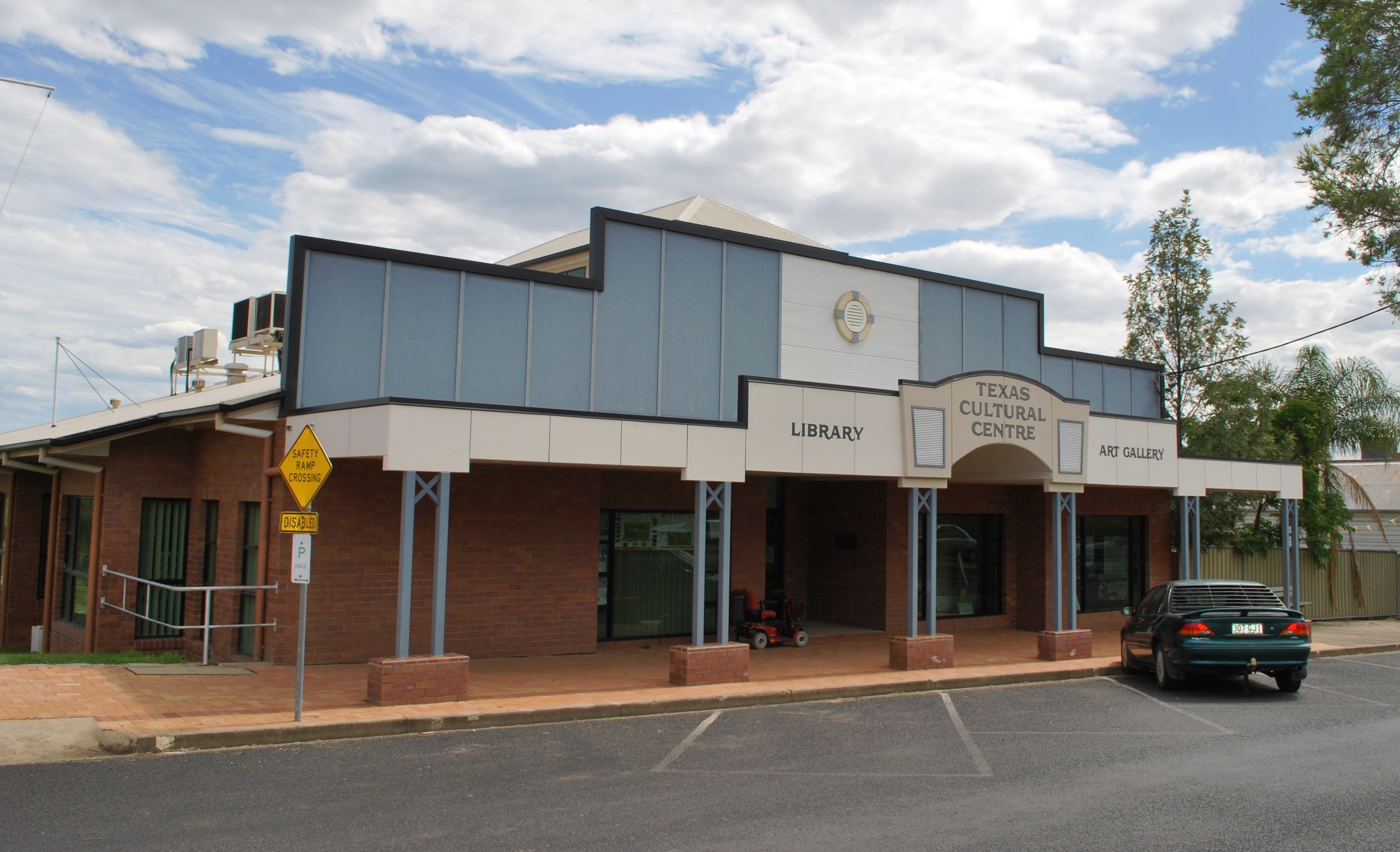
Texas public library, 2008

Texas public library is at 46 High Street (28.8550°S 151.1679°E). It is operated by the Goondiwindi Regional Council.

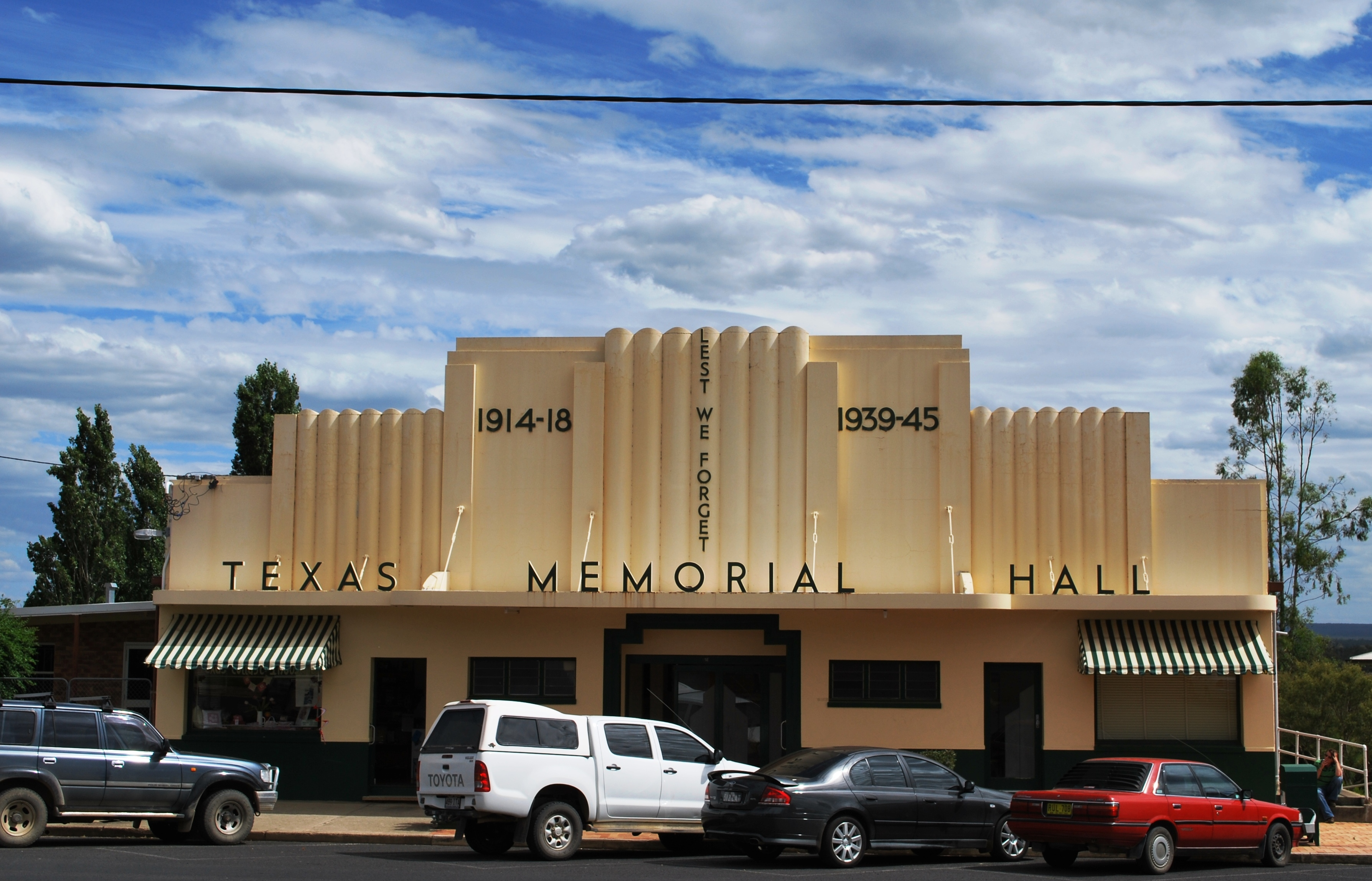
Texas Memorial Hall, 2008

Texas Memorial Hall is at 50 High Street (28.8551°S 151.1682°E). It is operated by the Goondiwindi Regional Council.

The Texas branch of the Queensland Country Women's Association has its rooms at 27 Broadway Street.

Texas has a swimming pool, bowls club, golf course, showground and a racecourse.

== Attractions ==
The Texas Heritage Centre and Tobacco Museum is at 50 Fleming Street (28.8564°S 151.1727°E).

== Media ==
Texas is serviced by the MacIntyre Gazette, Warwick Daily News and Stanthorpe Border Post newspapers. Texas is served by the Border Districts Community Radio Station 89.7 Ten FM which is transmitted from a 4 kW transmitter located on Mt Mackenzie in Tenterfield NSW.

== In popular culture ==
Lee Kernaghan also referenced the town in his 2002 hit song "Texas, Qld 4385" from his Electric Rodeo album released in 2002.

== Notable people ==
- Travis Burns – Rugby League player
- Peter Hitchener – Nine News Melbourne weekend presenter
