= Inglewood, Queensland =

Inglewood
- Town
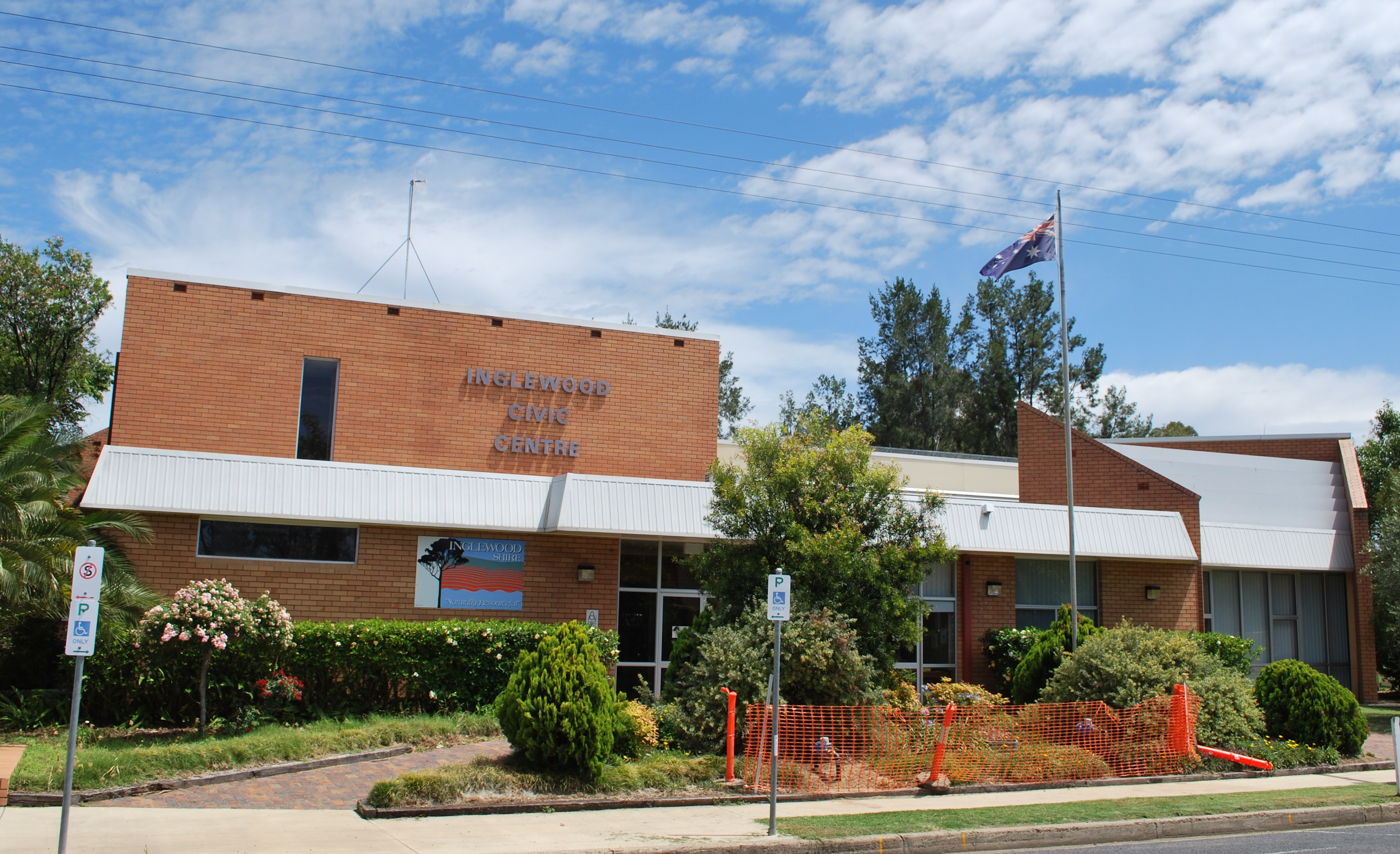
- Inglewood Civic Centre

- Interactive map of Inglewood
- Coordinates: 28.4161°S 151.08°E
- Country: Australia
- State: Queensland
- LGA: Goondiwindi Region
- Location: 91.4 km (56.8 mi) ENE of Goondiwindi; 109 km (68 mi) WSW of Warwick; 149 km (93 mi) SW of Toowoomba; 260 km (160 mi) SW of Brisbane
- Established: 1862

Government
  - State electorate: Southern Downs
  - Federal division: Maranoa

Area
  - Total: 357.2 km^{2} (137.9 sq mi)
- Elevation: 280 m (920 ft)

Population
  - Total: 936 (2021 census)
  - Density: 2.6204/km^{2} (6.787/sq mi)
- Time zone: UTC+10:00 (AEST)
- Postcode: 4387
Localities around Inglewood
Bybera	Canning Creek	Mosquito Creek
Whetstone	Inglewood	Coolmunda
Glenarbon	Brush Creek	Coolmunda

Inglewood is a rural town and locality in the Goondiwindi Region, Queensland, Australia. In the 2021 census, the locality of Inglewood had a population of 936 people.

== Geography ==
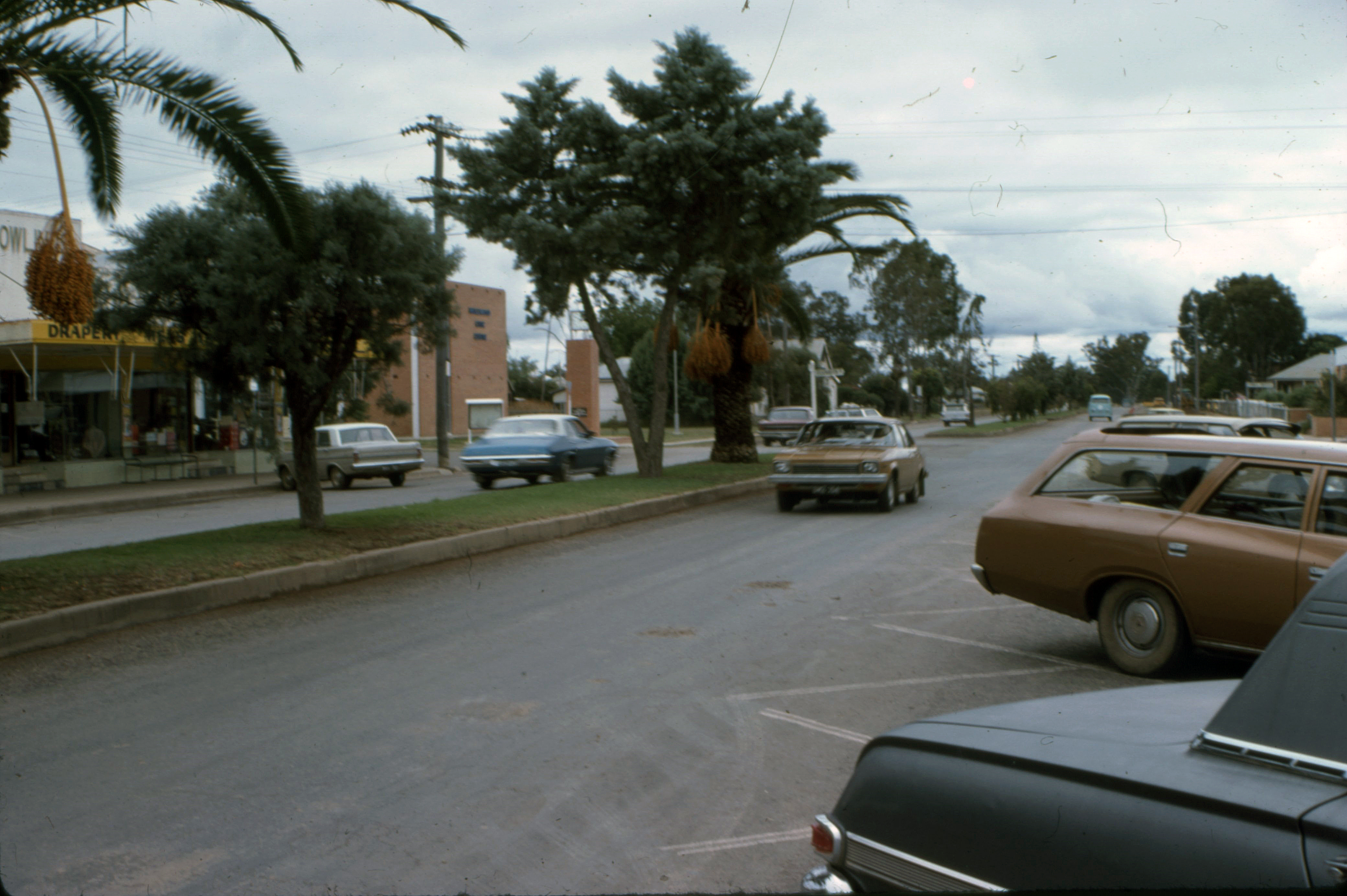
Inglewood, 1976

The town sits on the southern Darling Downs midway between the larger centres of Warwick and Goondiwindi on the Cunningham Highway. It is 150 km (93 mi) south-west of Toowoomba. The Inglewood–Texas Road runs to the south. The Millmerran–Inglewood Road (State Route 82) runs to the north.

It is part of the Border Rivers region of waterways. The confluence of the Macintyre Brook and Canning Creek is sited just north of Inglewood, with the brook running 270° around the town.

Olive growing is a comparatively new industry in the area. Other established industries include sheep and cattle raising, grain growing and timber harvesting. Tobacco growing was common around Inglewood over the last 60 years.

== History ==
Bigambul (also known as Bigambal, Bigumbil, Pikambul, Pikumbul) is an Australian Aboriginal language spoken by the Bigambul people. The Bigambul language region includes the landscape within the local government boundaries of the Goondiwindi Regional Council, including the towns of Goondiwindi, Yelarbon and Texas extending north towards Moonie and Millmerran.

English botanist and explorer Allan Cunningham has been credited with being the first European to discover the Inglewood area. He passed through east of the present township in May 1827. The first settlement in the area was known as Browns Inn and was an important watering point for bullock teams moving west. The inn opened in the late 1850s on the south side of Macintyre Brook.

In April 1862, a town was surveyed by L.F. Landsbergon on the higher northern side of Macintyre Book. Plans were drawn up for the present site and the name changed from Pariagna to Inglewood by Landsberg using a compound word ingol (an Aboriginal word meaning cypress pine) and the English word wood referring to a clump of trees on the northern side of the brook.

Inglewood Post Office opened on 16 September 1866. Most of the hinterland consisted of station holdings which were selected as early as 1848 and were the start of the wool, cattle and wheat base of the region.

Inglewood State School opened on 13 February 1872 as a primary with a secondary department opened on 25 January 1960.

An Anglican church opened in 1894.

A Catholic church opened in 1902.

Whetstone Provisional School opened on 19 July 1904 and became Whetstone State School on 1 January 1909. In 1910, it was renamed Inglewood West State School. It suffered from low student numbers and consequently closed and re-opened a number of times, closing finally in 1928. It was on a 2-acre (0.81 ha) site on the northern side of the Cunningham Highway in Inglewood (28.42613°S 151.02393°E).

Inglewood Presbyterian Church was officially opened and dedicated by Reverend Richard Kerr on Sunday 30 September 1906.

The Thane-to Inglewood section of the South Western railway line opened on 8 July 1907, with Inglewood being served by the Inglewood railway station. The station was originally called 'Pariagna' but the name was changed to Inglewood when the town's name changed. The next section from Inglewood to Goondiwindi was completed on 13 October 1908.

Nine years later Inglewood became a rail junction when the line to Texas was opened. It carried freight, including fuel to, and ore from, the Silverspur mine east of Texas. The Texas rail line was closed in 1994, due to lack of passengers and the usage of trucks to move freight. Local dairying was served by a branch factory of the Warwick Co-operative between 1940 and 1960.

A hospital was built in 1921.

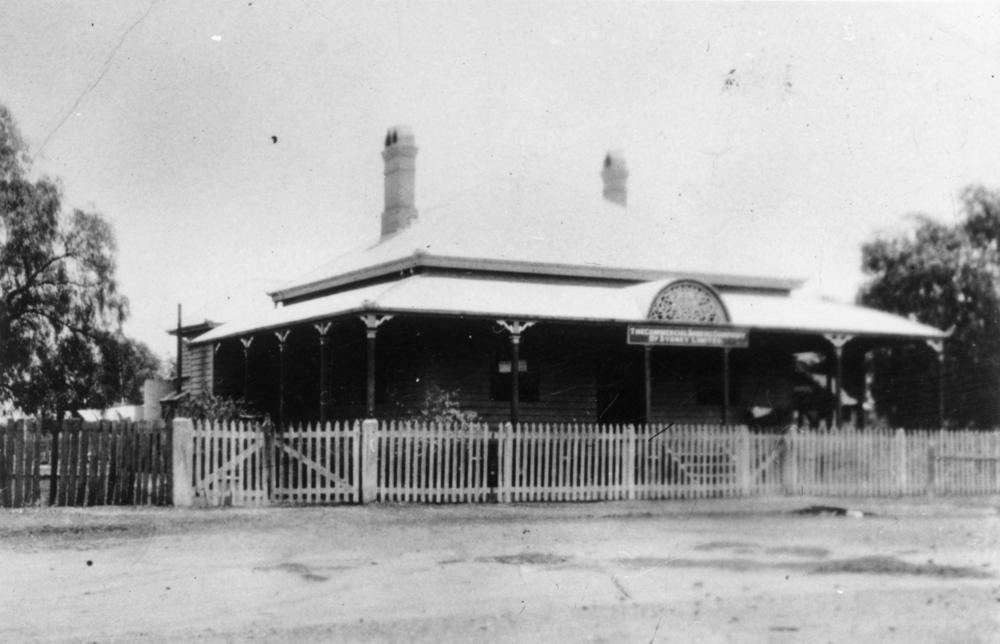
The Commercial Banking Company of Sydney building, Inglewood, ca. 1925

In 1925, Pugh's Queensland Directory recorded four hotels in Inglewood, two sawmills, a picture show and several other stores and tradespeople.

On 16 February 1922, the Inglewood War Memorial was dedicated by the Member of the Queensland Legislative Assembly for the Carnarvon, Major Edward Costello, as part of at the official opening of the Inglewood Memorial Hospital.

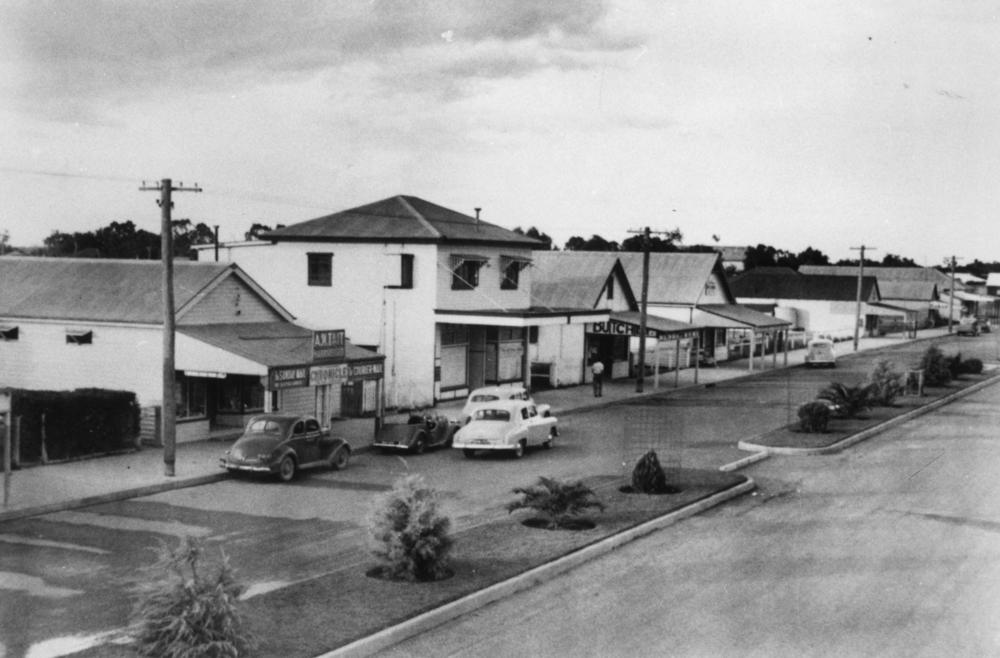
Looking east along Albert Street in Inglewood, 1951

St Maria Goretti's School opened on 5 February 1951 by the Sisters of St Joseph after having been blessed by the Roman Catholic Bishop of Toowoomba, Joseph Basil Roper on 28 January 1951. The school was named in honour of St Maria Goretti, an Italian girl who had been canonised in 1950 and a popular choice of the Italian immigrant families of the district. The school had 51 students in its first year.

Coolmunda Dam was built in 1968, where there was previously the Coolmunda School.

The Inglewood Public Library building was opened in 1996 with a minor refurbishment in 2011.

Inglewood town was the council seat of the former Shire of Inglewood until its amalgamation to form part of the larger Goondiwindi Region in 2008.

== Demographics ==
In the 2011 census, the locality of Inglewood has a population of 1,069 people.

In the 2016 census, the locality of Inglewood had a population of 954 people.

In the 2021 census, the locality of Inglewood had a population of 936 people.

== Education ==
Inglewood State School is a government primary and secondary (Early Childhood to Year 10) school for boys and girls at Chilcott Street (28.4161°S 151.0770°E). In 2017, the school had an enrolment of 141 students with 17 teachers (14 full-time equivalent) and 17 non-teaching staff (10 full-time equivalent). It includes a special education program.

St Maria Goretti School is a Catholic primary (Prep–6) school for boys and girls at Elizabeth Street (28.4130°S 151.0803°E). In 2017, the school had an enrolment of 23 students with 5 teachers (4 full-time equivalent) and 3 non-teaching staff (2 full-time equivalent).

Because Inglewood only offers schooling up to Year 10, students often travel daily to Goondiwindi by bus service (established in 1993) or use distance education or attend boarding schools in Warwick, Toowoomba and Brisbane to complete Years 11 and 12.

== Facilities ==
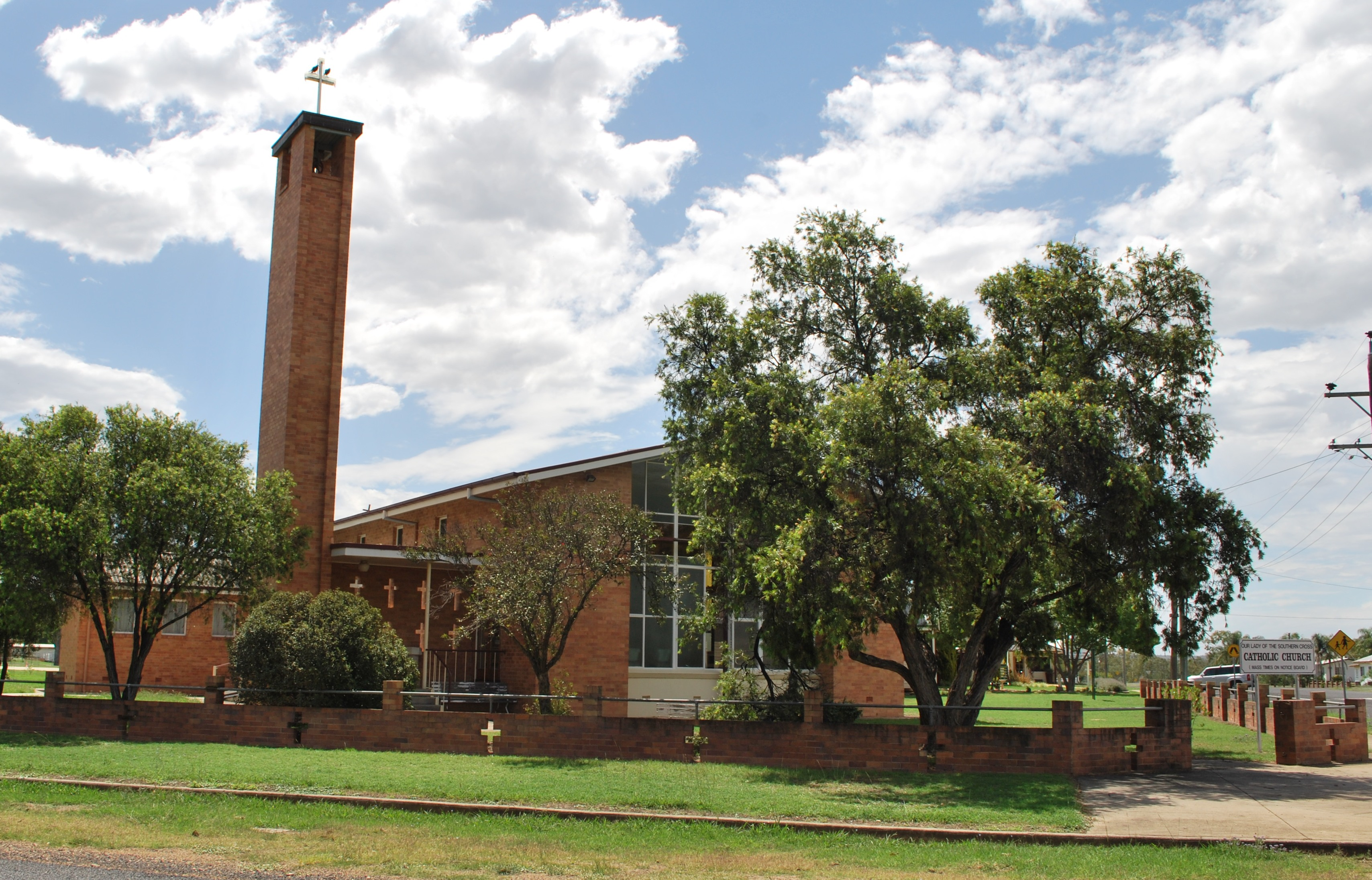
Our Lady of the Southern Cross Roman Catholic Church, 2008

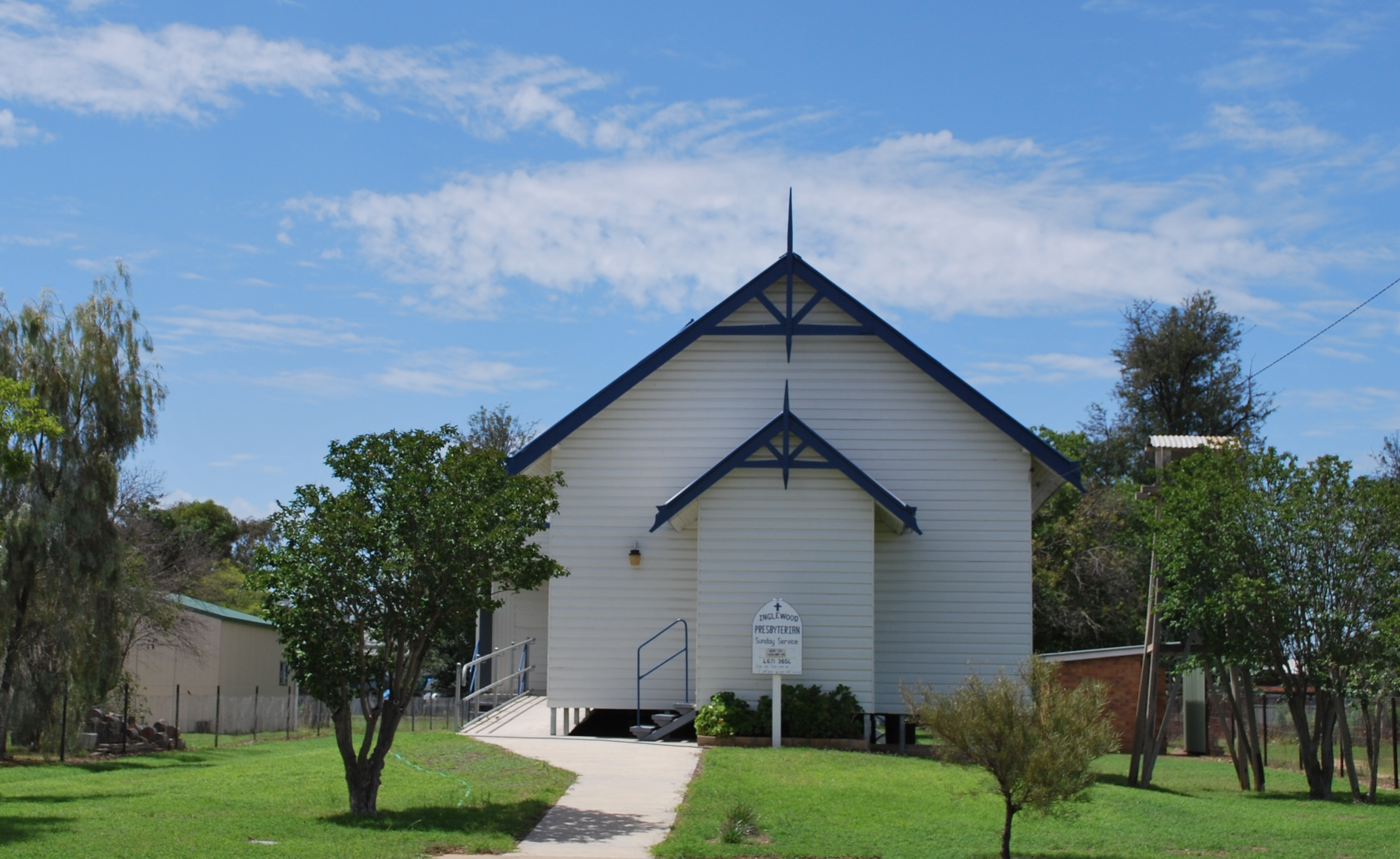
Inglewood Presbyterian Church

Inglewood has a public library open to the community, a Civic Centre which hosts local events and plays, sports grounds, tennis courts, swimming pool, golf course, and bowling club. The Goondiwindi Regional Council operates a public library in Inglewood at the Civic Centre, corner of Albert and Elizabeth Streets.

Our Lady of the Southern Cross Catholic Church is on the western corner of George and Elizabeth Streets (28.4136°S 151.0806°E).

Inglewood Presbyterian Church is at 15 Regent Street.

== Attractions ==
Inglewood's main attraction is Lake Coolmunda, 13 km (8.1 mi) east of town. The lake is a popular location for water skiing, sailing, canoeing, fishing, camping and bird watching. The Inglewood & District Historical Society runs a small exhibit in the Inglewood Heritage Centre showcasing the history of exploration, settlement, education, culture, agriculture, industry and transportation in the area.

== Climate ==
Inglewood has a humid subtropical climate (Köppen Cfa).

Climate data for Inglewood (Inglewood Forest, 2000–2014)
Month	Jan	Feb	Mar	Apr	May	Jun	Jul	Aug	Sep	Oct	Nov	Dec	Year
Record high °C (°F)	42.0 (107.6)	40.8 (105.4)	40.0 (104.0)	33.9 (93.0)	31.6 (88.9)	27.0 (80.6)	26.3 (79.3)	35.2 (95.4)	36.0 (96.8)	38.0 (100.4)	41.6 (106.9)	41.2 (106.2)	42.0 (107.6)
Mean daily maximum °C (°F)	33.2 (91.8)	32.5 (90.5)	30.4 (86.7)	27.3 (81.1)	22.4 (72.3)	19.0 (66.2)	18.6 (65.5)	21.0 (69.8)	25.3 (77.5)	28.0 (82.4)	30.1 (86.2)	31.5 (88.7)	26.6 (79.9)
Mean daily minimum °C (°F)	18.7 (65.7)	18.3 (64.9)	16.2 (61.2)	13.1 (55.6)	8.8 (47.8)	6.7 (44.1)	5.6 (42.1)	6.9 (44.4)	10.6 (51.1)	13.1 (55.6)	15.9 (60.6)	17.7 (63.9)	12.6 (54.7)
Record low °C (°F)	11.9 (53.4)	10.7 (51.3)	7.5 (45.5)	2.8 (37.0)	−2.0 (28.4)	−2.0 (28.4)	−2.7 (27.1)	−1.9 (28.6)	−2.0 (28.4)	3.5 (38.3)	4.6 (40.3)	8.6 (47.5)	−2.7 (27.1)
Average rainfall mm (inches)	72.3 (2.85)	54.5 (2.15)	63.5 (2.50)	27.4 (1.08)	28.6 (1.13)	33.3 (1.31)	28.7 (1.13)	24.3 (0.96)	34.0 (1.34)	49.7 (1.96)	79.9 (3.15)	97.3 (3.83)	587.3 (23.12)
Average precipitation days	7.4	7.2	6.8	4.7	4.6	7.5	5.9	5.0	5.8	7.2	8.7	8.5	79.3
Average relative humidity (%)	32	36	35	35	38	46	42	33	30	27	34	34	35
Source: Bureau of Meteorology

== See also ==
- Warwick
- Goondiwindi
- Texas
- Yelarbon
