= Billa Billa, Queensland =

Billa Billa
- Suburb
- Interactive map of Billa Billa
- Coordinates: 28.1558°S 150.2802°E
- Country: Australia
- State: Queensland
- LGA: Goondiwindi Region
- Location: 42.6 km (26.5 mi) N of Goondiwindi; 198 km (123 mi) WSW of Toowoomba; 215 km (134 mi) W of Warwick; 330 km (210 mi) WSW of Brisbane

Government
  - State electorate: Southern Downs
  - Federal division: Maranoa

Area
  - Total: 606.0 km^{2} (234.0 sq mi)

Population
  - Total: 111 (2021 census)
  - Density: 0.1832/km^{2} (0.4744/sq mi)
- Time zone: UTC+10:00 (AEST)
- Postcode: 4390
Suburbs around Billa Billa
Lundavra	Calingunee	Yagaburne
Goodar; Lundavra	Billa Billa	Yagaburne; Wyaga
Goodar	Goondiwindi	Wyaga

Billa Billa is a rural locality in the Goondiwindi Region, Queensland, Australia. In the 2021 census, Billa Billa had a population of 111 people.

== Geography ==
Billa Billa is crossed by the Leichhardt Highway and in the south east by the Gore Highway. Yarril Creek marks a small section of the boundary in east. The Weir River roughly follows the western extent of Billa Billa. The majority of the land is used for agriculture.

There are a number of lagoons in the locality:

- Billa Billa Lagoon (28.1833°S 150.2833°E)
- Tangan Lagoon (28.2166°S 150.25°E)
- Washpool Lagoon (28.2°S 150.2666°E)

== History ==
The name Billa Billa means pool or reach of water in an unknown Aboriginal dialect.

== Demographics ==
In the 2016 census, Billa Billa had a population of 107 people.

In the 2021 census, Billa Billa had a population of 111 people.

== Education ==
There are no schools in Billa Billa. The nearest government primary schools are:

- Goondiwindi State School in neighbouring Goondiwindi to the south
- Lundavra State School in neighbouring Lundavra to the west
- Moonie State School in Moonie to the north
- Kindon State School in Kindon to the east

The nearest government secondary school is Goondiwindi State High School in Goondiwindi.

== See also ==
- List of reduplicated Australian place names
