= Yagaburne, Queensland =

Yagaburne
- Suburb
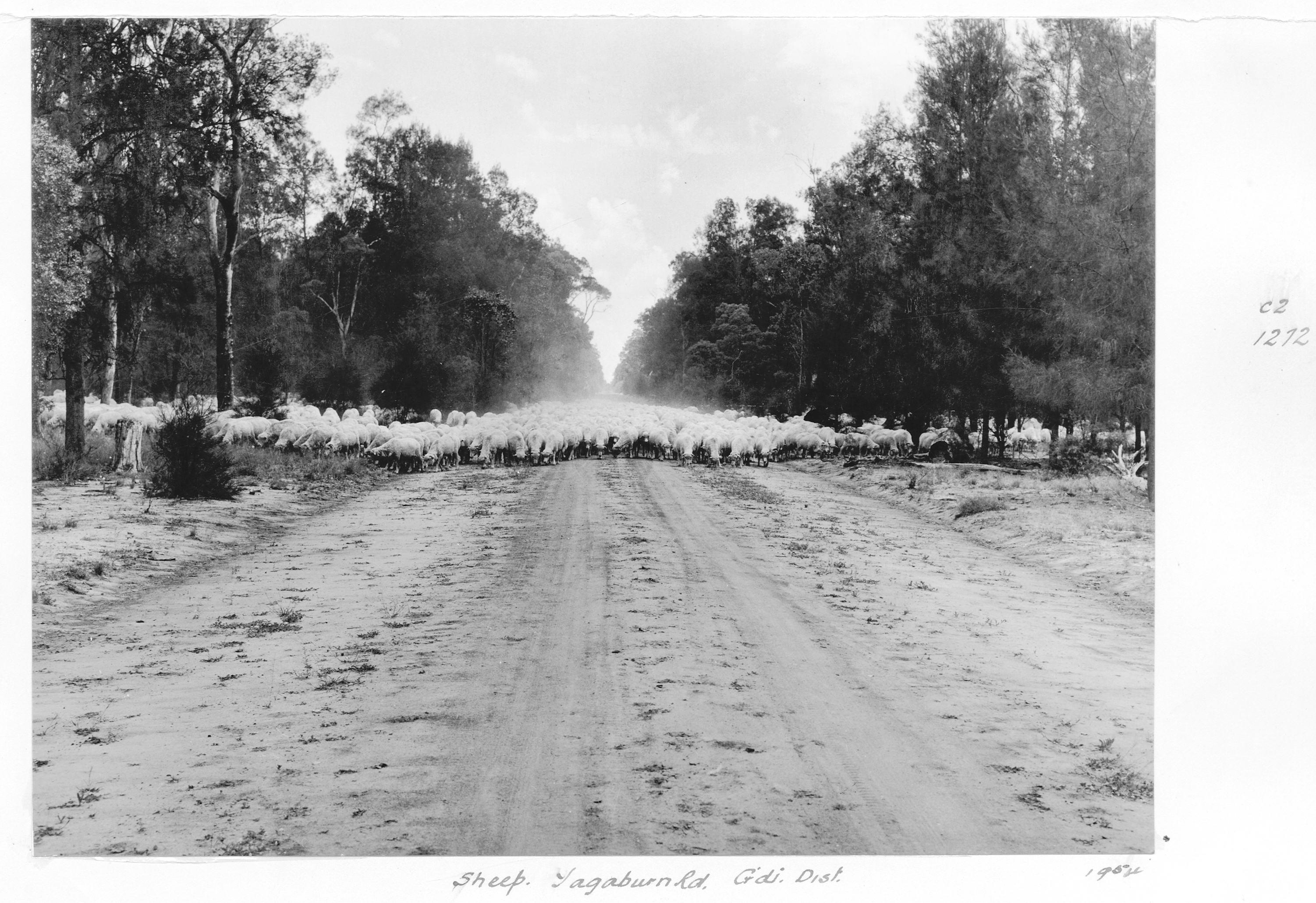
- Sheep, Yagaburn Road, 1954

- Interactive map of Yagaburne
- Coordinates: 28.0836°S 150.5283°E
- Country: Australia
- State: Queensland
- LGA: Goondiwindi Region
- Location: 62.3 km (38.7 mi) NNW of Goondiwindi; 189 km (117 mi) WSW of Toowoomba; 323 km (201 mi) WSW of Brisbane

Government
  - State electorate: Southern Downs
  - Federal division: Maranoa

Area
  - Total: 251.0 km^{2} (96.9 sq mi)

Population
  - Total: 28 (2021 census)
  - Density: 0.1116/km^{2} (0.289/sq mi)
- Time zone: UTC+10:00 (AEST)
- Postcode: 4390
Suburbs around Yagaburne
Calingunee	Moonie	Boondandilla
Billa Billa	Yagaburne	Wyaga
Billa Billa	Wyaga	Wyaga

Yagaburne is a rural locality in the Goondiwindi Region, Queensland, Australia. In the 2021 census, Yagaburne had a population of 28 people.

== Geography ==
Yarrill Creek forms the south-eastern and southern boundary of the locality.

Yagaburne Boondandilla Road commences in the southernmost point of the locality (near Billa Billa) and travels northward, exiting at the northernmost point of the locality (Boondandilla).

The land use is a mixture or crop growing and grazing on native vegetation.

== History ==
The locality name relates to an early pastoral run. The Yagaburne run appears on an 1883 map of the Darling Downs, believed to be taken up in the 1850s.

== Demographics ==
In the 2016 census, Yagaburne had a population of 13 people.

In the 2021 census, Yagaburne had a population of 28 people.

== Education ==
There are no schools in Yagaburne. The nearest government primary school is Kindon State School in Kindon to the east. The nearest government secondary school is Goondiwindi State High School in Goondiwindi to the south, but students in the north of Yagaburne might be too distant to attend this school. The alternatives are distance education and boarding school. There are also non-government primary and secondary schools in Goondiwindi.
