= Toobeah =

- Town
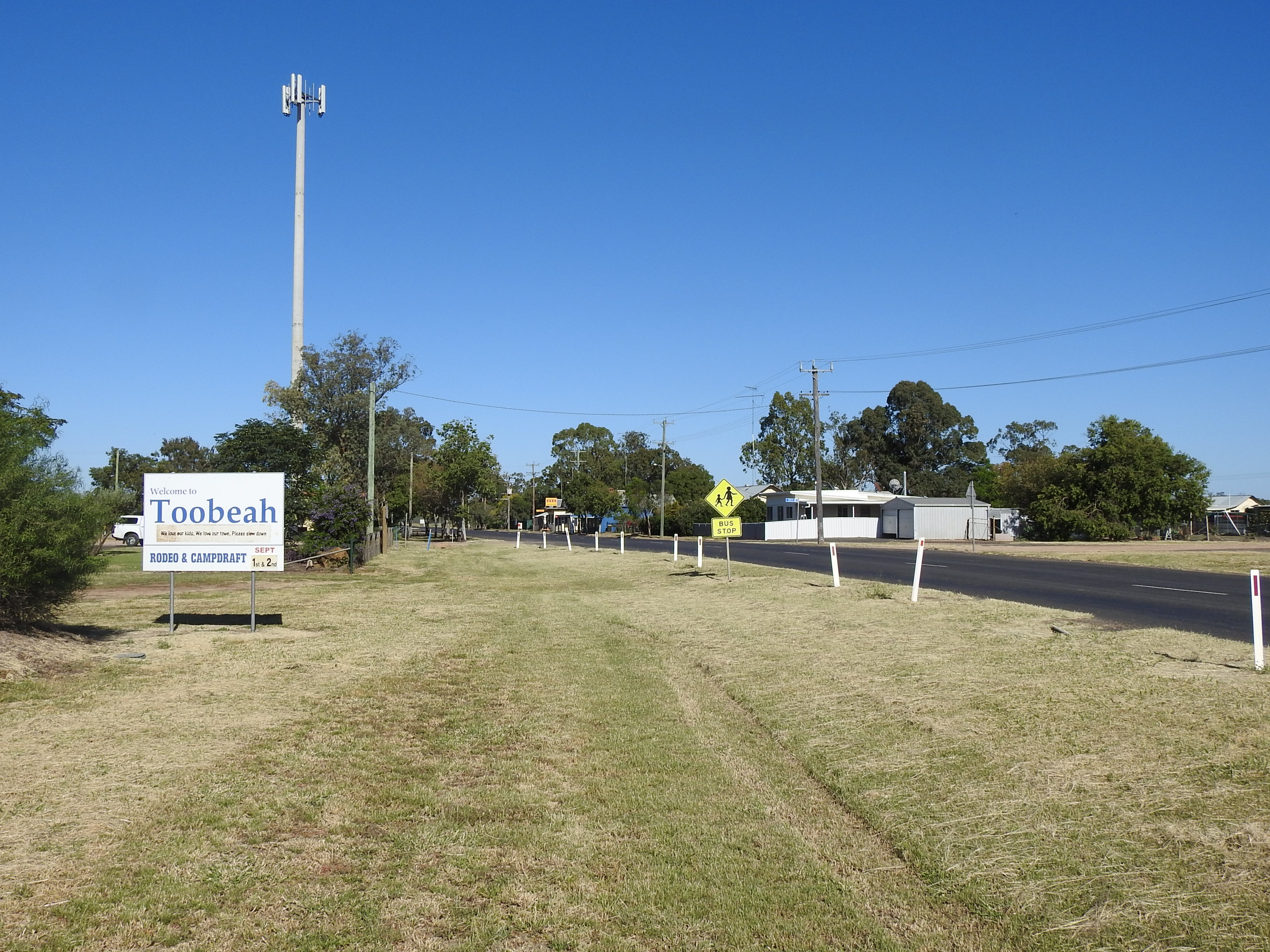
- Eastern entrance on the Barwon Highway (2021).

- Interactive map of Toobeah
- Coordinates: 28.4169°S 149.8702°E
- Country: Australia
- State: Queensland
- LGA: Goondiwindi Region
- Location: 49 km (30 mi) W of Goondiwindi; 265 km (165 mi) SW of Toowoomba; 389 km (242 mi) SW of Brisbane

Government
  - State electorate: Southern Downs
  - Federal division: Maranoa

Area
  - Total: 1,125.5 km^{2} (434.6 sq mi)

Population
  - Total: 149 (2021 census)
  - Density: 0.1324/km^{2} (0.3429/sq mi)
- Time zone: UTC+10:00 (AEST)
- Postcode: 4498
Localities around Toobeah
Kioma	Tarawera; Lundavra	Goodar
Bungunya	Toobeah	Callandoon
Boomi (NSW)	Boomi (NSW)	Boggabilla (NSW)

Toobeah, pronounced 'two beer', is a rural town and locality in the Goondiwindi Region, Queensland, Australia. The locality is on the border of Queensland and New South Wales. In the 2021 census, the locality of Toobeah had a population of 149 people.

== Geography ==
Toobeah is in the Darling Downs region. The town is on the Barwon Highway, 389 kilometres (242 mi) south west of the state capital, Brisbane.

== History ==
The town takes its name from the Toobeah railway station on the South Western railway line, which was established in 1910. The name is believed to be an Aboriginal word indicating to point, possibly because of the presence of a sign post at the road junction where the railway station was built.

Toobeah Provisional School opened on 12 October 1914. On 1 December 1914 it became Toobeah State School. It closed on 30 April 1964. It was on the northern corner of the Barwon Highway and Minnel Road (approx 28.41471°S 149.87191°E).

== Demographics ==
In the 2011 census, the locality of Toobeah and the surrounding rural area had a population of 218 people.

In the 2016 census, the locality of Toobeah had a population of 191 people.

In the 2021 census, the locality of Toobeah had a population of 149 people.

== Education ==
There are no schools in Toobeah. The nearest government primary schools are:

- Bungunya State School in neighbouring Bungunya to the west
- Kioma State School in neighbouring Kioma to the north-west
- Lundavra State School in neighbouring Lundavra to the north
- Goondiwindi State School in Goondiwindi to the east

The nearest government secondary school is Goondiwindi State High School in Goondiwindi. However, the northern and western parts of the locality of Toobeah would be too distant for a daily commute; alternatives are distance education and boarding school.

== Amenities ==
Facilities in the town include the Coronation Hotel and a general store.

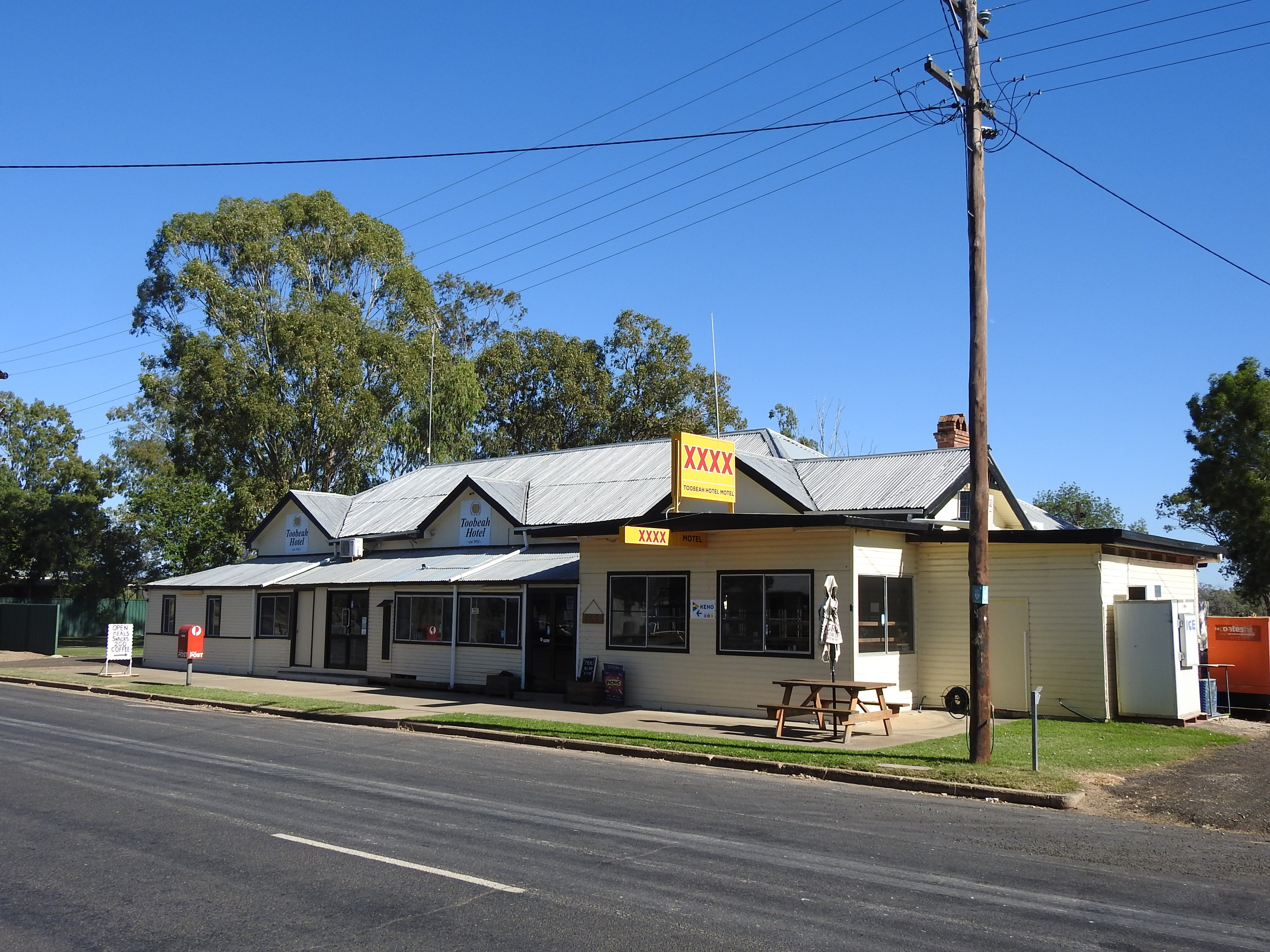
Toobeah hotel motel (2021).
