= Calingunee, Queensland =

Calingunee
- Suburb
- Interactive map of Calingunee
- Coordinates: 27.9986°S 150.3325°E
- Country: Australia
- State: Queensland
- LGA: Goondiwindi Region
- Location: 64.8 km (40.3 mi) N of Goondiwindi; 228 km (142 mi) SW of Toowoomba; 359 km (223 mi) WSW of Brisbane

Government
  - State electorate: Southern Downs
  - Federal division: Maranoa

Area
  - Total: 373.6 km^{2} (144.2 sq mi)

Population
  - Total: 18 (2021 census)
  - Density: 0.0482/km^{2} (0.125/sq mi)
- Time zone: UTC+10:00 (AEST)
- Postcode: 4390
Suburbs around Calingunee
Moonie	Moonie	Moonie
Lundavra	Calingunee	Yagaburne
Lundavra	Billa Billa	Yagaburne

Calingunee is a rural locality in the Goondiwindi Region, Queensland, Australia. In the 2021 census, Calingunee had a population of 18 people.

== Geography ==
The locality is bounded by the Weir River to the north-west and south-west.

The Leichhardt Highway passes through the locality from north (Moonie) to south (Billa Billa).

Calingunee State Forest 1 is the north-west of the locality, while Calingunee State Forest 2 is in the north-east of the locality. Apart from these, the land use is predominantly grazing on native vegetation with some cropping.

== Demographics ==
In the 2016 census, Calingunee had a population of 26 people.

In the 2021 census, Calingunee had a population of 18 people.

== Education ==
There are no schools in the locality. The nearest government primary schools are Moonie State School in neighbouring Moonie to the north and Lundavra State School in neighbouring Lundavra to the south-west. The nearest government secondary school is Goondiwindi State High School in Goondiwindi to the south.
