= Goodar, Queensland =

Goodar
- Suburb
- Interactive map of Goodar
- Coordinates: 28.3394°S 150.1322°E
- Country: Australia
- State: Queensland
- LGA: Goondiwindi Region
- Location: 10.2 km (6.3 mi) NW of Goondiwindi; 288 km (179 mi) SW of Toowoomba; 361 km (224 mi) WSW of Brisbane

Government
  - State electorate: Southern Downs
  - Federal division: Maranoa

Area
  - Total: 749.4 km^{2} (289.3 sq mi)

Population
  - Total: 101 (2021 census)
  - Density: 0.1348/km^{2} (0.3491/sq mi)
- Time zone: UTC+10:00 (AEST)
- Postcode: 4390
Suburbs around Goodar
Lundavra	Billa Billa	Billa Billa
Toobeah	Goodar	Goondiwindi
Toobeah	Callandoon	Goondiwindi

Goodar is a rural locality in the Goondiwindi Region, Queensland, Australia. In the 2021 census, Goodar had a population of 101 people.

== Geography ==
The locality is bounded by the Barwon Highway to the south.

The Umbercollie State Forest is in the west of the locality.

The South Western railway line enters the locality from the south-east (Goondiwindi) and exits to the south-west (Toobeah).

The land use is a mixture of dry and irrigated crop growing along with grazing on native vegetation.

== History ==
The locality takes its name from a pastoral run held from 1847 by James Mark, transferred to Edward Gostwyk Cory in August 1849.

=== The James Mark killings ===
James Mark was infamous due to a campaign of slaughter he perpetrated on the local Aboriginal population in the late 1840s. He first occupied the Yallaroi run to the south of the Macintyre River but was forced to abandon it due to Aboriginal resistance. In 1847 he took up the Goodar run, where he was described by neighbouring colonists as a hater of all Aboriginals and would shoot any he saw.

In 1847, Mark killed an Aboriginal boy and in revenge the local Aborigines killed Mark's nine year old son. Mark then went on a killing spree, travelling through the district recruiting stockmen and landholders at other stations, forming a vigilante death squad to avenge his son. Police officers from Warialda also joined the group or participated in follow-up attacks.

Around 50 Aboriginal people were killed by Mark's gang, most of whom were peaceful people who were employed on the local pastoral stations such as Umbercollie, Broomfield, Callandoon and Carbucky. The killings were mostly done at night when the victims were sleeping and a significant proportion were women and children.

Eventually several members of his group were arrested but Marks himself evaded capture and left the district. None of those arrested were found guilty of any offence. Mark's actions were important in the New South Wales Government's decision to form a Native Police force in 1848 to operate in the northern districts of the colony.

=== Railways ===
The Goondiwindi-to-Talwood section of the South Western railway opened on 4 May 1910 with the locality being served by two railway stations:

- Callandoon North railway station (now abandoned, 28.4931°S 150.1873°E)
- Carbuckey railway station (now abandoned, 28.4720°S 150.1284°E)

== Demographics ==
In the 2016 census, Goodar had a population of 65 people.

In the 2021 census, Goodar had a population of 101 people.

== Education ==
There are no schools in Goodar. The nearest government primary schools are Goondiwindi State School in neighbouring Goondiwindi to the south-east, Lundavra State School in neighbouring Lundavra to the north-west and Kioma State School in Kioma to the west. The nearest government secondary school is Goondiwindi State High School in Goondiwindi.
