= Kioma, Queensland =

Kioma
- Suburb
- Interactive map of Kioma
- Coordinates: 28.2197°S 149.7988°E
- Country: Australia
- State: Queensland
- LGA: Goondiwindi Region
- Location: 75.5 km (46.9 mi) NW of Goondiwindi; 264 km (164 mi) WSW of Toowoomba; 396 km (246 mi) WSW of Brisbane

Government
  - State electorate: Southern Downs
  - Federal division: Maranoa

Area
  - Total: 302.0 km^{2} (116.6 sq mi)

Population
  - Total: 32 (2021 census)
  - Density: 0.1060/km^{2} (0.274/sq mi)
- Time zone: UTC+10:00 (AEST)
- Postcode: 4498
Suburbs around Kioma
Tarawera	Tarawera	Lundavra
Tarawera	Kioma	Toobeah
Bungunya	Bungunya	Toobeah

Kioma is a rural locality in the Goondiwindi Region, Queensland, Australia. In the 2021 census, Kioma had a population of 32 people.

== Geography ==
The Meandarra – Talwood Road (State Route 74) forms part of the western boundary.

== History ==
John Hubert Fairfax established Kioma Station in the early twentieth century. He was a grandson of John Fairfax, one of the early proprietors of The Sydney Morning Herald, and his wife was Ruth Fairfax (née Dowling), a founding member of the Australian Country Women's Association.

Kioma State School opened on 9 November 1959 in response to a request from the managers of "Kioma" Station.

== Demographics ==
In the 2016 census, Kioma had a population of 30 people.

In the 2021 census, Kioma had a population of 32 people.

== Economy ==
There are a number of homesteads in the locality:

- Denver (28.1380°S 149.8385°E)
- Kioma (28.2095°S 149.7847°E), as of 2019 operated by JH Fairfax and Son

Kioma Station has an airstrip (28.2202°S 149.7943°E) adjacent to the school.

== Education ==
Kioma State School is a government primary (Prep-6) school for boys and girls at Kioma Road (28.2172°S 149.7940°E). In 2018, the school had an enrolment of 15 students with 3 teachers (2 full-time equivalent) and 5 non-teaching staff (2 full-time equivalent).

There is no secondary school in Kioma. The nearest government secondary school is Goondiwindi State High School in Goondiwindi to the south-east, but at such a distance that distance education and boarding school would be alternatives.
