= Boondandilla, Queensland =

Boondandilla
- Suburb
- Interactive map of Boondandilla
- Coordinates: 27.9088°S 150.6111°E
- Country: Australia
- State: Queensland
- LGA: Goondiwindi Region
- Location: 48.7 km (30.3 mi) NW of Kindon; 89.6 km (55.7 mi) NNE of Goondiwindi; 156 km (97 mi) WSW of Toowoomba; 290 km (180 mi) WSW of Brisbane

Government
  - State electorate: Southern Downs
  - Federal division: Maranoa

Area
  - Total: 273.4 km^{2} (105.6 sq mi)

Population
  - Total: 0 (2021 census)
  - Density: 0.0000/km^{2} (0.000/sq mi)
- Time zone: UTC+10:00 (AEST)
- Postcode: 4406
Suburbs around Boondandilla
Moonie	Weir River	Weir River
Moonie	Boondandilla	Western Creek; Bulli Creek
Yagaburne	Yagaburne	Kindon; Wyaga

Boondandilla is a rural locality in the Goondiwindi Region, Queensland, Australia. In the 2021 census, Boondandilla had "no people or a very low population".

== Geography ==
Most of the locality is within the Boondandilla State Forest. The north-west of the locality is used for grazing on native vegetation.

== History ==
The locality was officially named and bounded on 26 November 1999.

== Demographics ==
In the 2016 census, Boondandilla had "no people or a very low population".

In the 2021 census, Boondandilla had "no people or a very low population".

== Education ==
There are no schools in Boondandilla. The nearest government primary school is Kindon State School in neighbouring Kindon to the south-east. There are no nearby secondary schoosl; the alternatives are distance education and boarding schools.
