= Lundavra, Queensland =

Lundavra
- Suburb
- Interactive map of Lundavra
- Coordinates: 28.0711°S 149.9994°E
- Country: Australia
- State: Queensland
- LGA: Goondiwindi Region
- Location: 70.1 km (43.6 mi) NW of Goondiwindi; 258 km (160 mi) W of Warwick; 365 km (227 mi) WSW of Brisbane

Government
  - State electorate: Southern Downs
  - Federal division: Maranoa

Area
  - Total: 565.6 km^{2} (218.4 sq mi)

Population
  - Total: 56 (2021 census)
  - Density: 0.0990/km^{2} (0.2564/sq mi)
- Time zone: UTC+10:00 (AEST)
- Postcode: 4390
Suburbs around Lundavra
| Westmar | Southwood | Moonie |
| Tarawera | Lundavra | Billa Billa; Calingunee |
| Toobeah | Toobeah | Goodar |

Lundavra is a rural locality in the Goondiwindi Region, Queensland, Australia. In the 2021 census, Lundavra had a population of 56 people.

== Geography ==
The Moonie Highway passes to the north, the Leichhardt Highway to the east, the Barwon Highway to the south, and the Meandarra Talwood Road (State Route 74) to the west.

== History ==
Lundavra State School opened on 3 February 1964 with 16 students under principal Mr N Grayson.

== Demographics ==
In the 2016 census, Lundavra had a population of 100 people.

In the 2021 census, Lundavra had a population of 56 people.

== Education ==
Lundavra State School is a government primary (Prep-6) school for boys and girls at 238 Lienassie Road (28.0702°S 149.9820°E). In 2016, the school had an enrolment of 10 students with 2 teachers (1 full-time equivalent) and 4 non-teaching staff (2 full-time equivalent). In 2018, the school had an enrolment of 14 students with 2 teachers and 4 non-teaching staff (2 full-time equivalent). In 2023, the school had an enrolment of 2 students. As at 2025, the school remains officially open, but is not operating.

There are no secondary schools in Lundavra. The nearest government secondary school is Goondiwindi State High School in Goondiwindi to the south-east. However, it is sufficiently distant that distance education or boarding school would be alternatives.
