= Goondiwindi War Memorial =

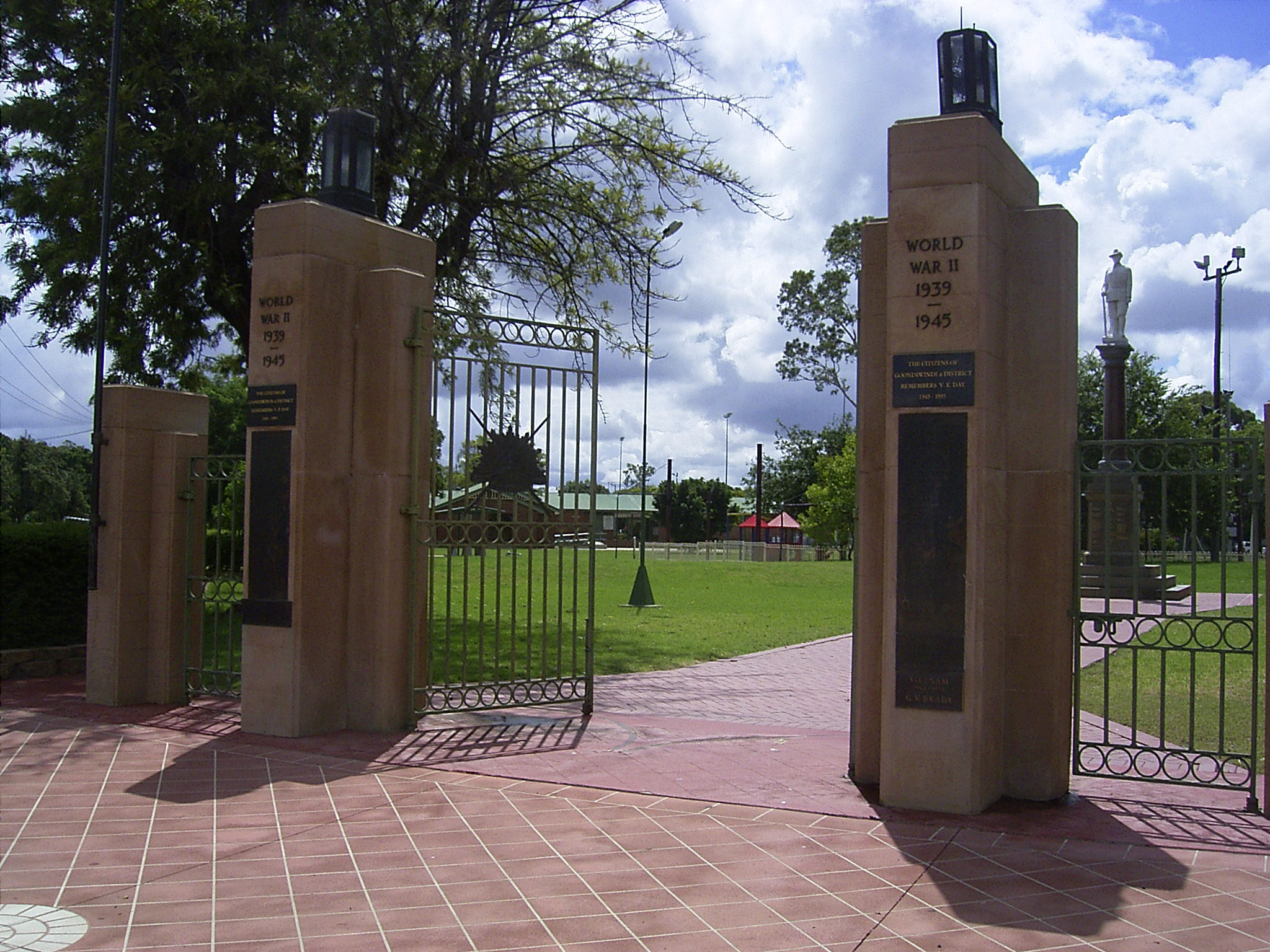
- War Memorial Gates, 2009

- Location within Queensland
- 28.546°S 150.3026°E
- Location: Marshall Street, Goondiwindi, Goondiwindi Region, Queensland, Australia

History
- Design period: 1919–1930s (interwar period)
- Built: 1922, 1949

Queensland Heritage Register
- Official name: Goondiwindi War Memorial, Memorial Gates, The Soldiers' Memorial (Digger Statue)
- Type: state heritage (built, landscape)
- Designated: 21 October 1992
- Reference no.: 600532
- Significant period: 1922– (social); 1922–1949 (historical, fabric)
- Significant components: memorial – soldier statue, pathway/walkway, memorial – gate/s, trees/plantings

Goondiwindi War Memorial is a heritage-listed war memorial at Marshall Street, Goondiwindi, Goondiwindi Region, Queensland, Australia. The memorial includes a life-sized statue of a Digger (WWI, built in 1922) and memorial gates (WWII, built in 1949). It is also known as Memorial Gates and The Soldiers' Memorial (Digger Statue). It was added to the Queensland Heritage Register on 21 October 1992.

== History ==
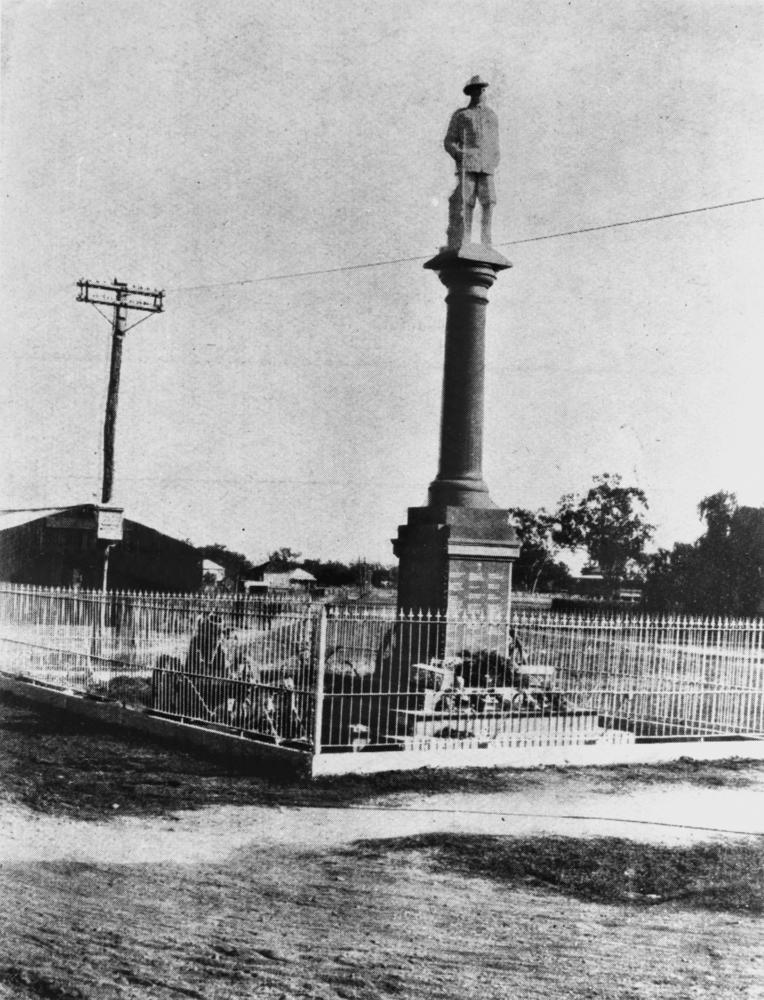
War memorial, 1924

The Goondiwindi War Memorial includes a digger statue unveiled 21 September 1922 and a set of gates erected in 1949, as memorials to the First and Second World Wars respectively.

The Soldiers' Monument was originally erected in Herbert Street, with an iron fence surrounding the monument. The monument cost £1 800 and was unveiled on 21 September 1922, by Sir Matthew Nathan, Governor of Queensland, who was in Goondiwindi to observe an eclipse of the sun. It is likely that the monument was erected by a public committee. Although the designer of the monument is unknown, it is possible that it was manufactured in New South Wales.

In 1949 the monument was re-sited, presumably at the time the World War 2 Memorial Gates were constructed. More than £2,844 was spent on transferring the monument to the park site and erecting the gates. The gates were erected by the Goondiwindi War Memorial Committee, and were unveiled in April 1949 by Sir Thomas William Glasgow. At the completion of the ceremony the keys of the gates were handed to Alderman F Vetter, symbolic of the town accepting responsibility and custody of the memorial. The designer of the gates is also unknown.

== Description ==
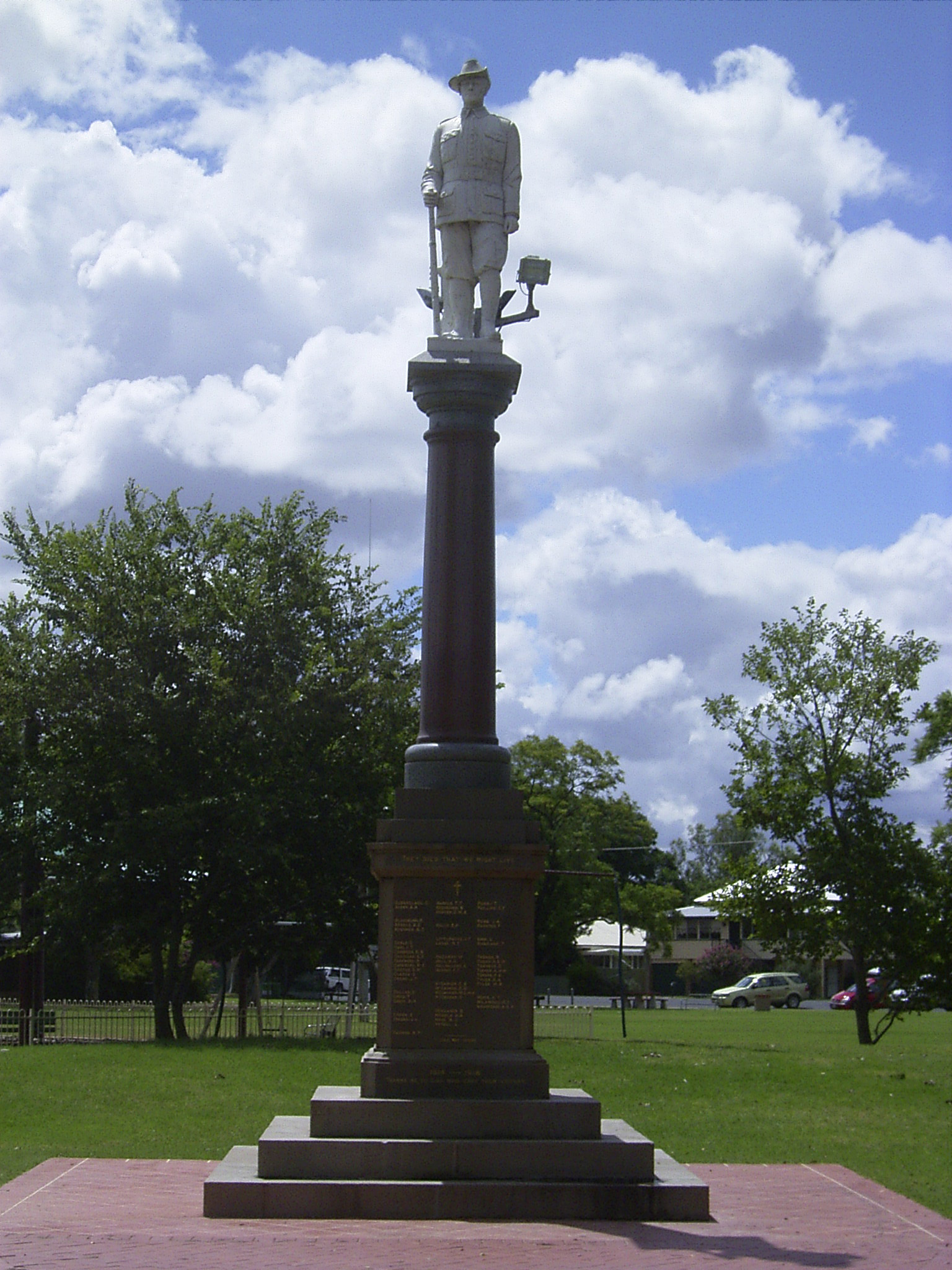
War memorial, 2009

The Goondiwindi War Memorial is located at the western end of Goondiwindi's main street, in the south-eastern corner of the Goondiwindi Memorial Park. The memorial consists of a Digger monument (WWI) and memorial gates (WWII). The monument rises to approximately six metres and is centrally placed within a generous square enclosure whose boundaries are defined by poplar trees, hedges, silky oaks and figs. The monument is axially aligned with the memorial gates, which truncate the street corner. The monument framed by the gates with a backdrop of poplar trees creates an impressive formal tableau.

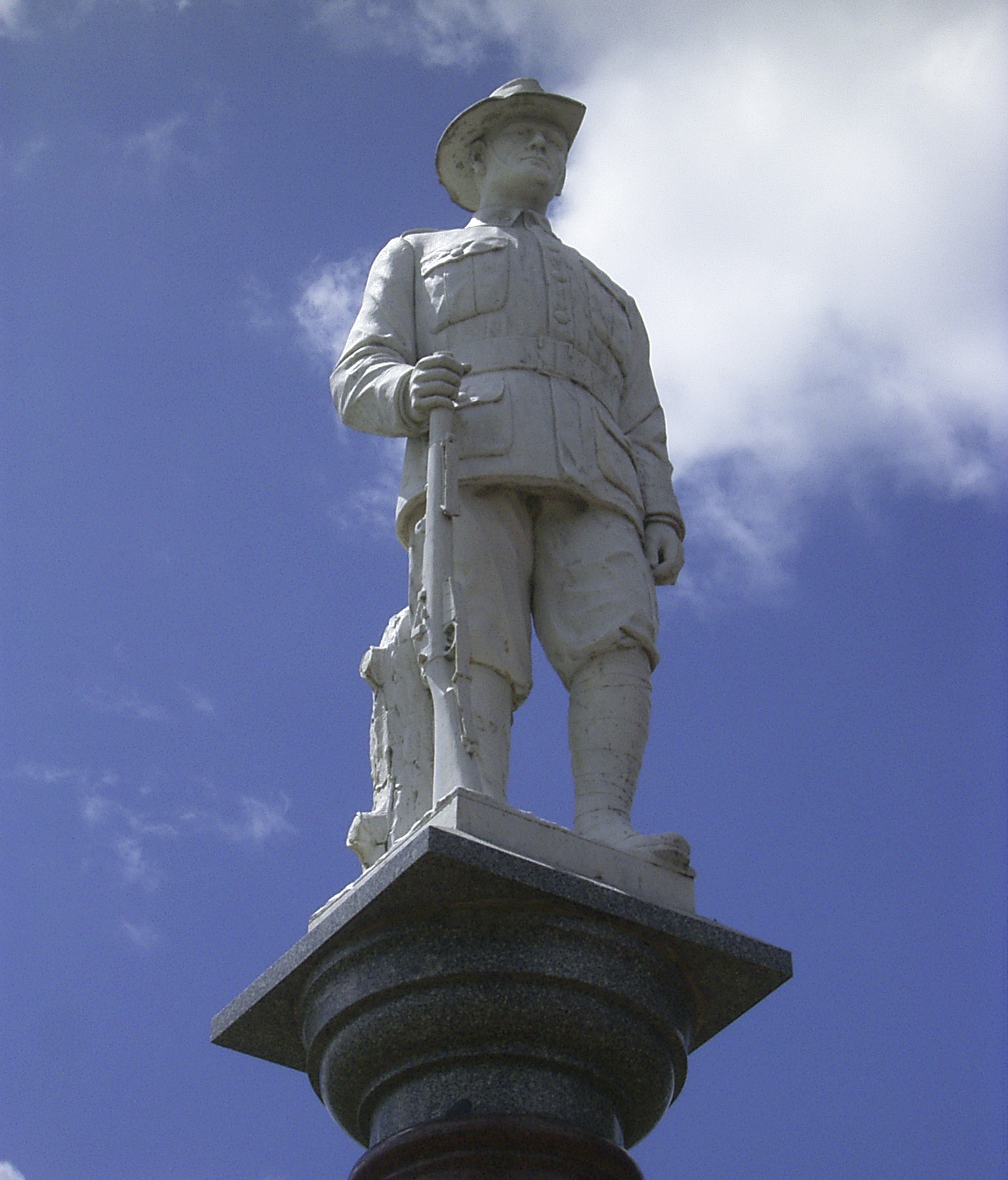
Digger statue, 2009

The monument consists of a life-sized grey sandstone Digger on a red and grey polished granite column, which sits on a polished blocked trachyte pedestal and a stepped concrete base. The pedestal has gilt inscriptions, and the column has a grey granite base and capital with a red granite shaft. The Digger stands with his left foot forward, holding the top of the rifle barrel in his right hand.

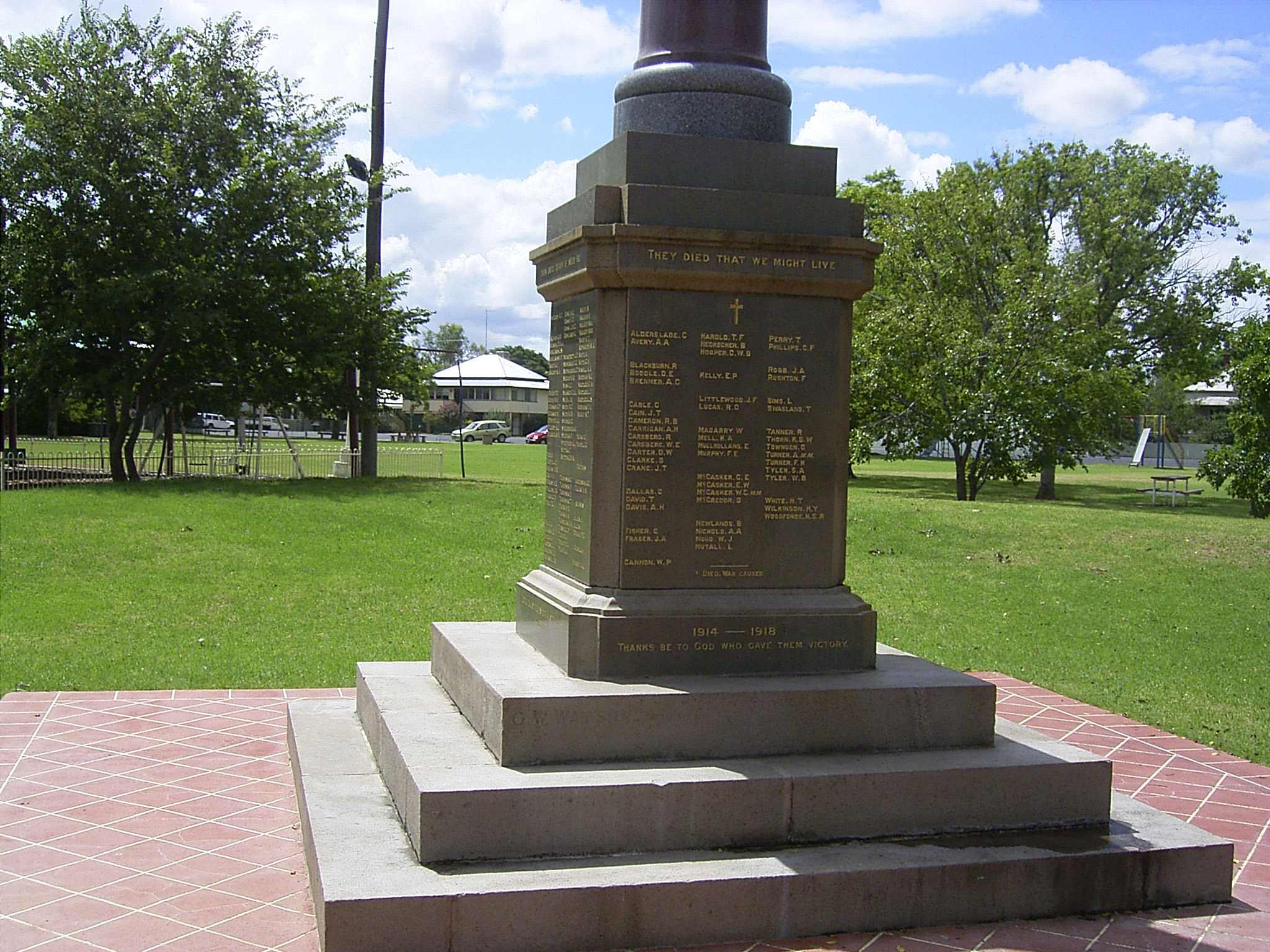
Monument detail, 2009

The memorial gates are formed with sandstone pillars and decorative steel gates, and comprise a central gateway flanked by two smaller gateways. The pillars have sandstone nibs, and are topped with rectilinear octagonal light fittings. The gates have circular motifs and crests.

The monument is well-crafted in fine materials, and the formal tableau of the monument and poplars framed by the gates makes a strong aesthetic contribution to the Goondiwindi townscape.

== Heritage listing ==
Goondiwindi War Memorial was listed on the Queensland Heritage Register on 21 October 1992 having satisfied the following criteria.

The place is important in demonstrating the evolution or pattern of Queensland's history.

The Goondiwindi War Memorial is important in demonstrating the pattern of Queensland's history, as evidence of an era of widespread expression of Australian patriotism and nationalism, during and following the First World War.

The place is important because of its aesthetic significance.

It exhibits aesthetic characteristics valued by the community: the monument is well-crafted in unusual and fine materials; and the formal tableau of the monument and poplars framed by the gates makes an aesthetic contribution to the Goondiwindi townscape.

The place has a strong or special association with a particular community or cultural group for social, cultural or spiritual reasons.

It has a strong association with the community as evidence of the impact of a major historical event.
