= Wyaga Homestead =

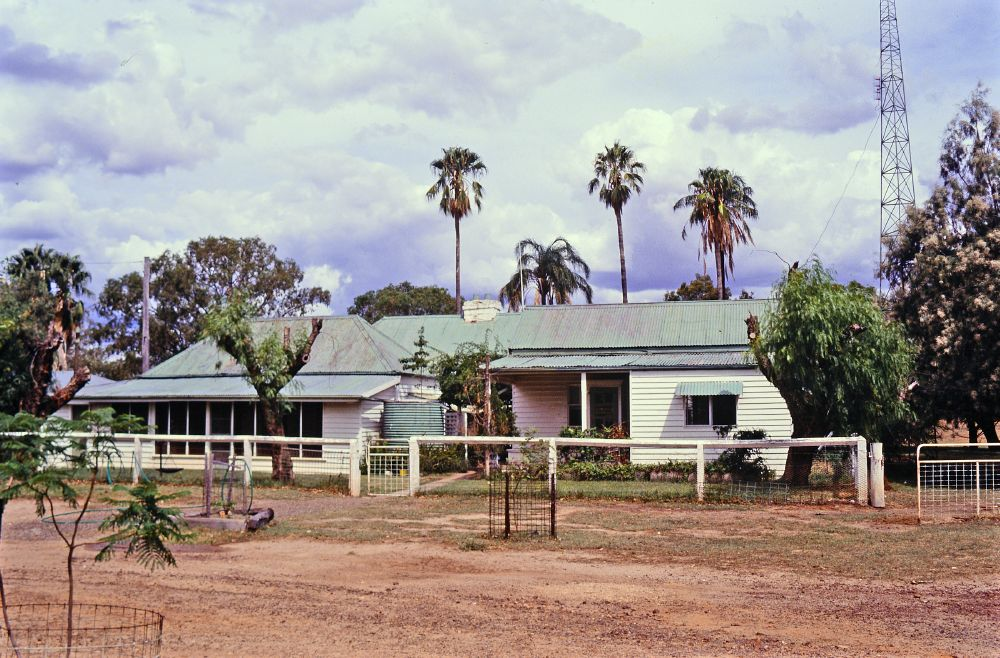
- Wyaga Homestead

- Location within Queensland
- 28.1668°S 150.6475°E
- Location: Millmerran Road, Wyaga, Goondiwindi Region, Queensland, Australia

History
- Design period: 1840s–1860s (mid-19th century)
- Built: c. 1862

Queensland Heritage Register
- Official name: Wyaga Homestead
- Type: state heritage (built)
- Designated: 5 May 1995
- Reference no.: 600940
- Significant period: 1860s (fabric)
- Significant components: chimney/chimney stack, residential accommodation – main house

Wyaga Homestead is a heritage-listed homestead at Millmerran Road, Wyaga near Goondiwindi, Goondiwindi Region, Queensland, Australia. It was built c. 1862. It was added to the Queensland Heritage Register on 5 May 1995.

== History ==
Wyaga is situated north-east of Goondiwindi and is thought to be one of the oldest cattle runs in the original Darling Downs district, when the Wyaga run of approximately 60 000 acres was leased by David Perrier in 1849.

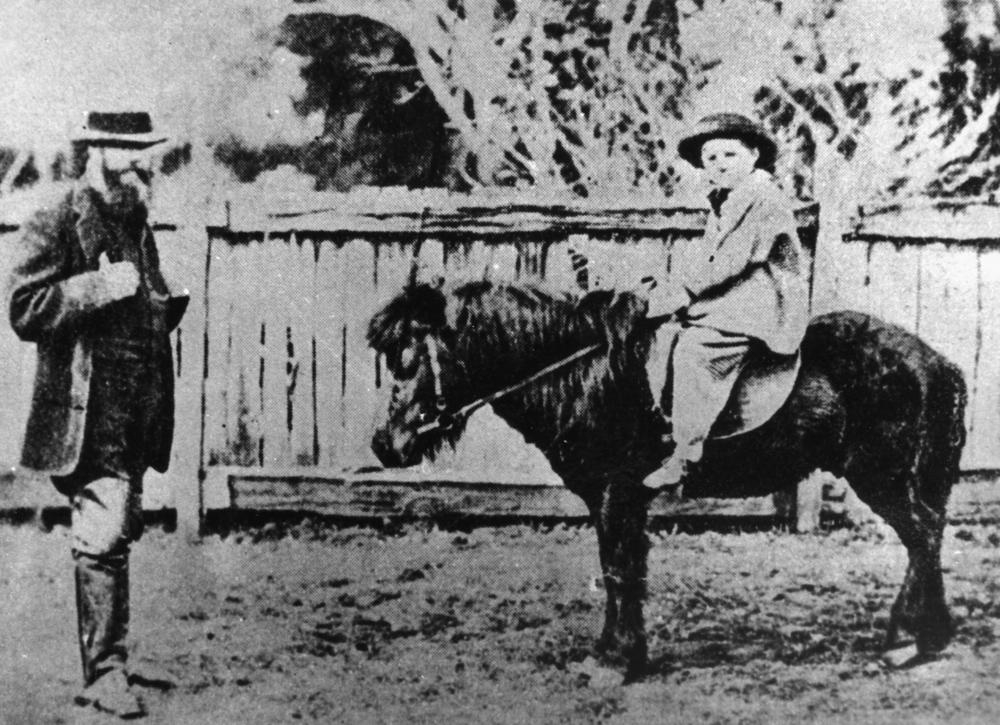
Donald Gunn with son Donald at Wyaga Station, circa 1862

By the late 1850s Wyaga had been acquired by Thomas de Lacy Moffatt, and W M Turner. Moffatt was the Member of the Queensland Legislative Assembly for Western Downs from 1860 to 1864 and Colonial Treasurer from 1862 to 1864. In 1860 it was acquired by Donald Gunn senior. The improvements on the property included a woolshed and several huts. A homestead was built for Gunn c. 1862 from timber hand sawn on the property, with a shingle roof and using square, hand made nails.

Gunn sold Wyaga to the Holmes family c. 1863, and the property passed through a number of hands before being acquired in the 1890s by Thomas Cook and Hugh Munro as part of their grazing empire. The property had been progressively reduced in area. After Thomas Cook's death in 1912, the property was bought by Munro. In 1913 a new partnership was created between Munro and Frederick Charles Turner. The Wyaga merino stud was founded in 1938. A number of outbuildings, including a new woolshed are believed to have been constructed in the 1930s. The partnership between Munro and Turner was dissolved in 1944, and the Wyaga Partnership created. By the 1950s Wyaga was running both cattle and sheep.

The homestead was substantially altered and extended, possibly during the 1950s. Wyaga remained in the Munro family until 1975. It was acquired by the present owners in 1982.

== Description ==
The core of the c. 1862 homestead consists of a simple north–south running rectangular plan with a verandah along the western frontage, and remains of a verandah along the eastern frontage. The end rooms have been altered and extended, however the central living and dining rooms remain mostly intact. These rooms have double leaf French doors, with louvres to the outer leaf and glazed timber doors to the inner leaf; the doors have casement fanlights above. The interiors are lined with wide horizontal painted timbers, and boarded ceilings.

The western wall has deep chamferboards which may be pit-sawn. The verandah has been closed in with flyscreen, but retains its splayed, chamfered verandah posts. The eastern verandah has been extended out to the east to form part of a large living room; the verandah posts, also splayed and chamfered, are now in the centre of this room, which links the original homestead remains to the rest of the later additions.

An appreciation of the overall form of the house, including the now corrugated iron-clad gambrel roof, can be gleaned from the west, and a substantial brick chimney rises above the ridge of the roof.

== Heritage listing ==
Wyaga Homestead was listed on the Queensland Heritage Register on 5 May 1995 having satisfied the following criteria.

The place is important in demonstrating the evolution or pattern of Queensland's history.

The surviving sections of the c. 1862 Wyaga Homestead demonstrate a now rare aspect of Queensland's cultural heritage, in particular, 19th-century building practices which are no longer in common use. The surviving sections of the c. 1862 homestead have the potential to contribute to an understanding of the development of building technology in Queensland.

The place demonstrates rare, uncommon or endangered aspects of Queensland's cultural heritage.

The surviving sections of the c. 1862 Wyaga Homestead demonstrate a now rare aspect of Queensland's cultural heritage, in particular, 19th-century building practices which are no longer in common use.

The place has potential to yield information that will contribute to an understanding of Queensland's history.

The surviving sections of the c. 1862 homestead have the potential to contribute to an understanding of the development of building technology in Queensland.
