= Callandoon, Queensland =

Callandoon
- Suburb
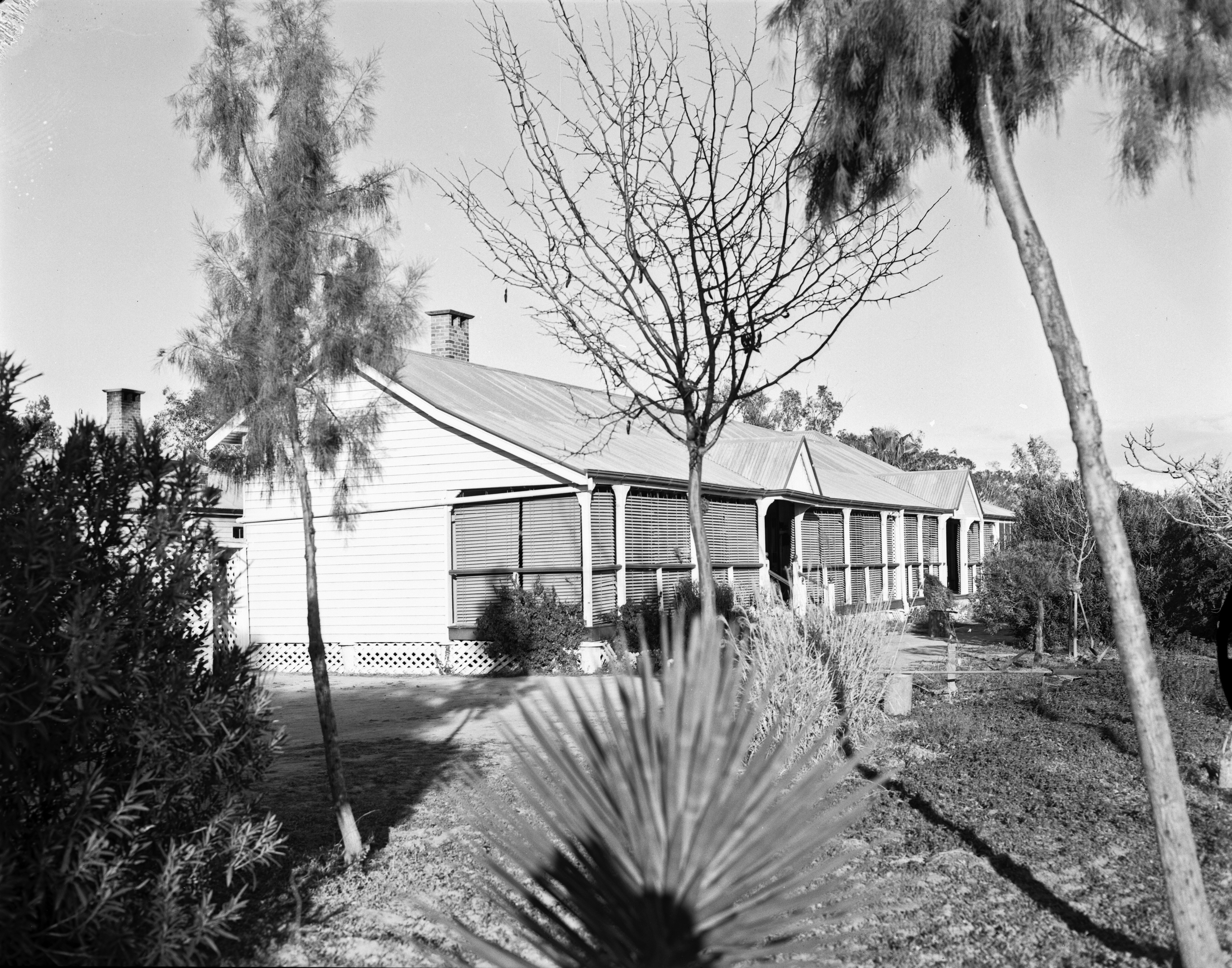
- Homestead, North Callandoon, 1952

- Interactive map of Callandoon
- Coordinates: 28.5277°S 150.0925°E
- Country: Australia
- State: Queensland
- LGA: Goondiwindi Region
- Location: 18.1 km (11.2 mi) WNW of Goondiwindi; 218 km (135 mi) WSW of Warwick; 236 km (147 mi) WSW of Toowoomba; 369 km (229 mi) WSW of Goondiwindi

Government
  - State electorate: Southern Downs
  - Federal division: Maranoa

Area
  - Total: 248.2 km^{2} (95.8 sq mi)

Population
  - Total: 32 (2021 census)
  - Density: 0.1289/km^{2} (0.334/sq mi)
- Time zone: UTC+10:00 (AEST)
- Postcode: 4390
Suburbs around Callandoon
Toobeah	Goodar	Goodar
Toobeah	Callandoon	Goondiwindi
Toobeah	Boggabilla (NSW)	Boggabilla (NSW)

Callandoon is a rural locality in the Goondiwindi Region, Queensland, Australia. It is on the border of Queensland and New South Wales. In the 2021 census, Callandoon had a population of 32 people.

== Geography ==
The Macintyre River forms the southern boundary of the locality which is also part of the border between Queensland and New South Wales.

The land use is a mixture of crop growing and grazing on native vegetation.

== History ==
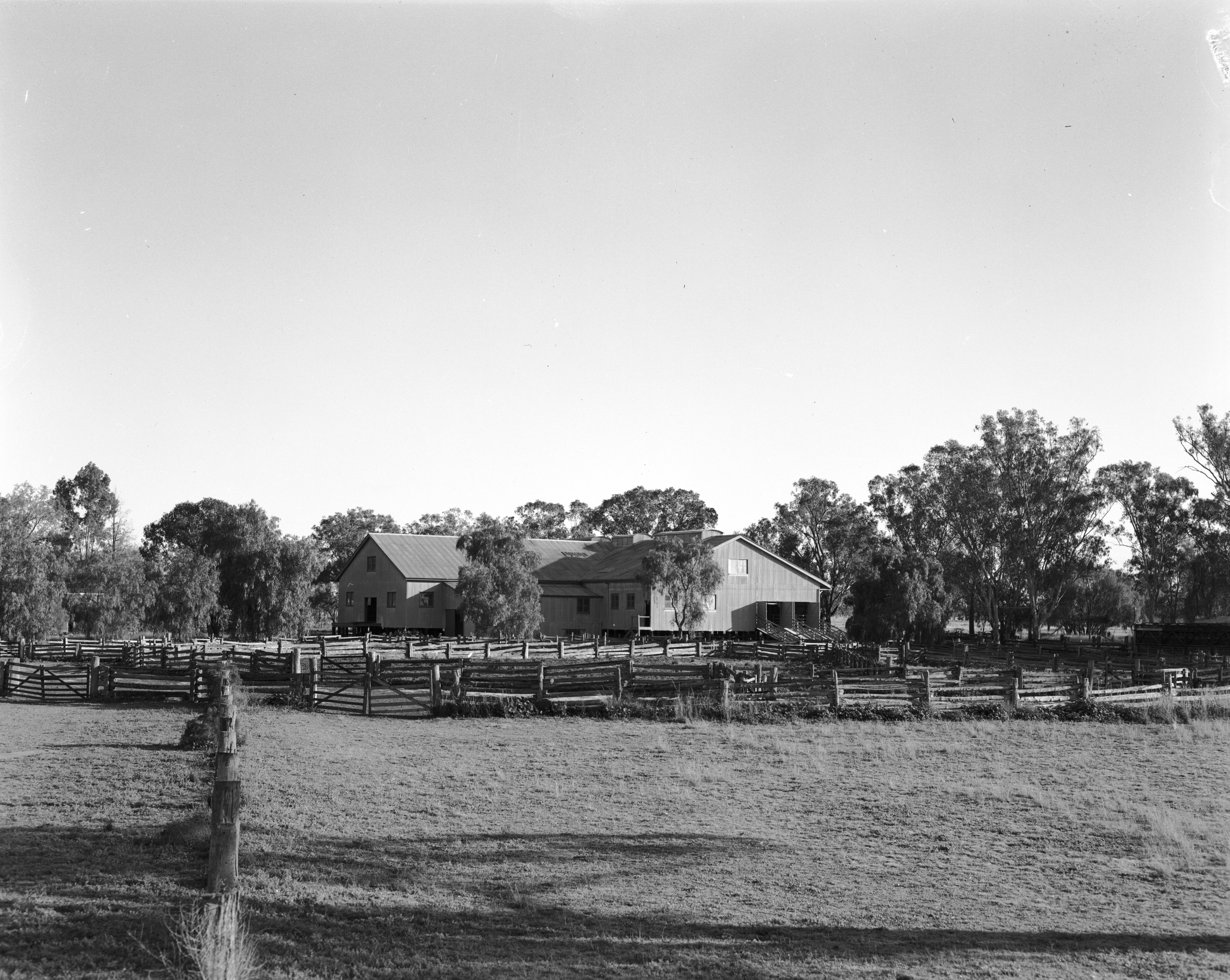
Woolshed, North Callandoon, 1952

Callandoon pastoral station was established in the mid 1840s by the prominent colonial capitalist and New South Wales politician Augustus Morris. Strong Aboriginal resistance to the British occupancy of their lands in the area induced Morris and other prominent landholders such as William Wentworth to organise a Native Police force to crush the indigenous recalcitrance. Frederick Walker was the first Commandant of this force and through violent and coercive measures, he was able to place the area under British control by 1850. Callandoon became the headquarters of the Native Police until 1853.

Callendoon Provisional School opened in 1893 and closed in 1893, operating for only a few months.

== Demographics ==
In the 2016 census, Callandoon had a population of 33 people.

In the 2021 census, Callandoon had a population of 32 people.

== Education ==
There are no schools in Callandoon. The nearest government primary and secondary schools are Goondiwindi State School and Goondiwindi State High School, both in neighbouring Goondiwindi to the east.

There are also a number of non-government schools in Goondiwindi.
