= Goondiwindi Airport =

- IATA: GOO; ICAO: YGDI

Summary
- Airport type: Public
- Operator: Goondiwindi Regional Council
- Serves: Goondiwindi, Queensland, Australia
- Location: Goondiwindi, Queensland, Australia
- Elevation AMSL: 714 ft / 218 m
- Coordinates: 28°31′17″S 150°19′13″E

Map
- Location in Queensland

Runways
Direction	Length		Surface
Direction	m	ft	Surface
04/22	1,340	4,396	Asphalt
12/30	795	2,608	Clay
- Sources: Australian AIP and aerodrome chart

Goondiwindi Airport (IATA: GOO, ICAO: YGDI) is an airport located 2 nautical miles (3.7 km; 2.3 mi) north of Goondiwindi, Queensland, Australia.

During the 2011 Queensland floods disaster, a temporary field hospital was established at the airport as the town hospital had been inundated.

== See also ==
- List of airports in Queensland
