= Wyaga, Queensland =

Wyaga
- Suburb
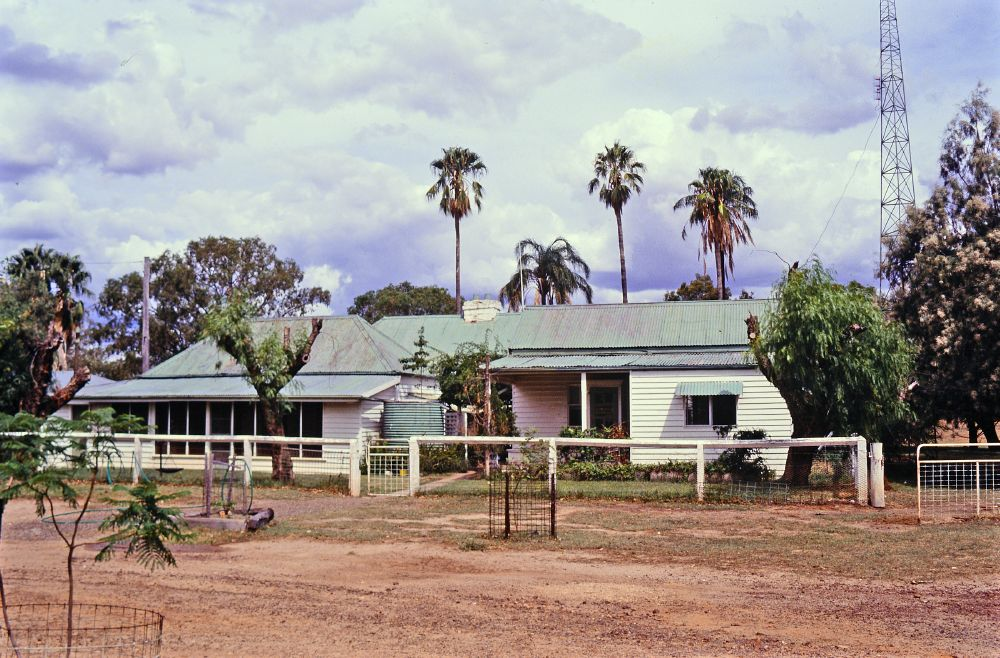
- Wyaga Homestead

- Interactive map of Wyaga
- Coordinates: 28.2°S 150.6516°E
- Country: Australia
- State: Queensland
- LGA: Goondiwindi Region
- Location: 68.6 km (42.6 mi) NE of Goondiwindi; 153 km (95 mi) SW of Toowoomba; 283 km (176 mi) WSW of Brisbane

Government
  - State electorate: Southern Downs
  - Federal division: Maranoa

Area
  - Total: 643.0 km^{2} (248.3 sq mi)

Population
  - Total: 77 (2021 census)
  - Density: 0.1198/km^{2} (0.3102/sq mi)
- Time zone: UTC+10:00 (AEST)
- Postcode: 4390
Suburbs around Wyaga
Yagaburne	Boondandilla	Kindon
Billa Billa	Wyaga	Kindon
Goondiwindi	Wondalli	Bybera

Wyaga is a rural locality in the Goondiwindi Region, Queensland, Australia. In the 2021 census, Wyaga had a population of 77 people.

== Geography ==
The Gore Highway passes through from east to west.

== History ==
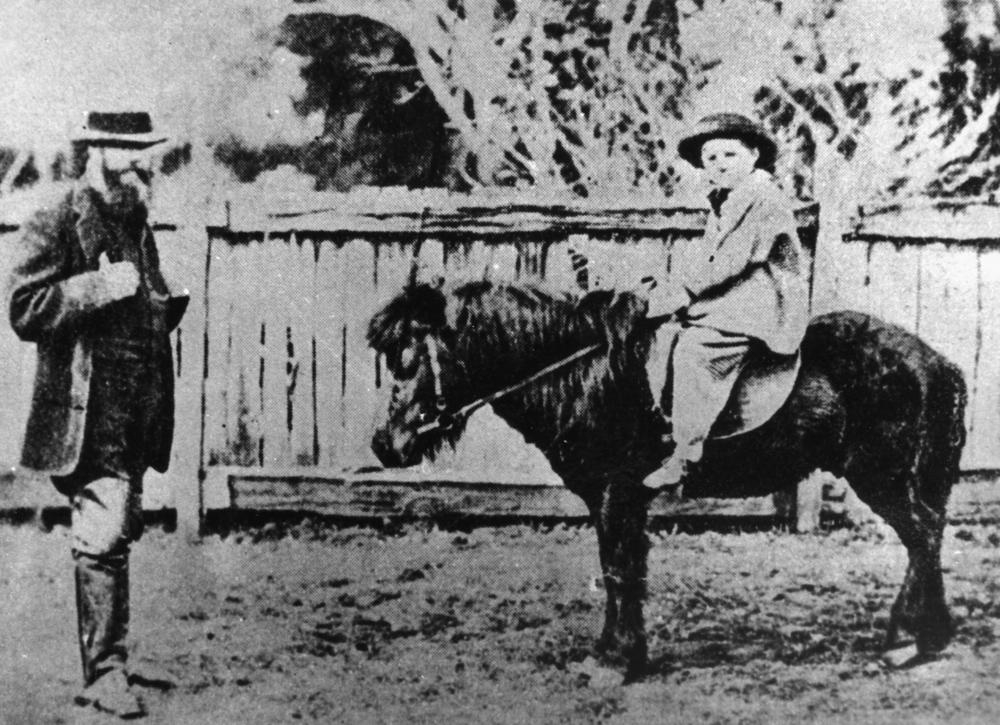
Donald Gunn with son Donald at Wyaga Station, circa 1862

The locality was named after an early pastoral run in the district, held in the late 1840s by David Perrier and then transferred to J.J.Whitting in 1849. Wyaga appears on an 1883 Darling Downs map.

== Demographics ==
In the 2016 census, Wyaga had a population of 94 people.

In the 2021 census, Wyaga had a population of 77 people.

== Heritage listings ==
Wyaga has the following heritage-listed sites:

- Wyaga Homestead, Millmerran Road (28.1668°S 150.6475°E)

== Education ==
There are no schools in Wyaga. The nearest government primary schools are Kindon State School in neighbouring Kindon to the north-east and Goondiwindi State School in neighbouring Goondiwindi to the south-west. The nearest government secondary schools are Goondiwindi State High School (to Year 12) in Goondiwindi and Inglewood State School (to Year 10) in Inglewood to the south-east. However, most of Wyaga is too far from these secondary schools for a daily commute. The alternatives are distance education and boarding school.
