= Bybera, Queensland =

Bybera
- Suburb
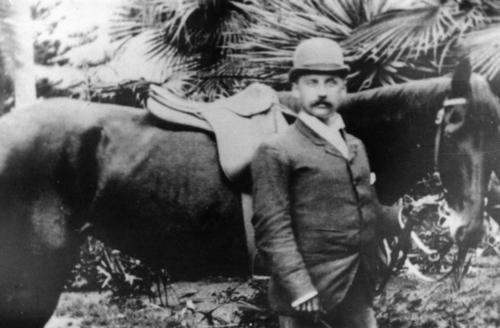
- Dr Eugen Hirschfeld, 1920

- Interactive map of Bybera
- Coordinates: 28.2675°S 150.9391°E
- Country: Australia
- State: Queensland
- LGA: Goondiwindi Region
- Location: 34.9 km (21.7 mi) NW of Inglewood; 82.5 km (51.3 mi) NE of Goondiwindi; 147 km (91 mi) W of Warwick; 187 km (116 mi) SW of Toowoomba; 305 km (190 mi) WSW of Brisbane

Government
  - State electorate: Southern Downs
  - Federal division: Maranoa

Area
  - Total: 383.5 km^{2} (148.1 sq mi)

Population
  - Total: 0 (2021 census)
  - Density: 0.0000/km^{2} (0.000/sq mi)
- Time zone: UTC+10:00 (AEST)
- Postcode: 4387
Suburbs around Bybera
Kindon	Kindon	Bringalily; Woondul
Wondalli; Wyaga	Bybera	Canning Creek
Whetstone	Inglewood	Inglewood

Bybera is a rural locality in the Goondiwindi Region, Queensland, Australia. In the 2021 census, Bybera had "no people or a very low population".

== Geography ==
The Twenty Five Mile Rocky Waterhole is a waterhole (28.2666°S 150.8833°E).

White Dam is a reservoir (28.2666°S 151.0666°E).

Much of the locality is within the protected areas of:

- the southern section of Wondul Range National Park
- Bringalily State Forest, which extends into the neighbouring locality of Canning Creek to the east
- Whetstone State Forest, which extends into the neighbouring localities of Kindon to the north-west and Whetstone to the south-west

Apart from these protected areas, the land use is predominantly grazing on native vegetation with some crop growing in the south-west of the locality.

== History ==
The name derives from the homestead "Bybera" which was owned by Eugen Hirschfeld. Hirschfeld had been a member of the Queensland Legislative Council and the Queensland Medical Board before he was interned and then later exiled for being German during World War I. He was not allowed to return to Australia after the war, until General Sir John Monash personally campaigned for his return. When Hirschfeld finally returned to Australia in 1927, he purchased pastoral properties in the Inglewood and Yelarbon areas, where he experimented with pasture improvement. He also researched the potential of Australian native vegetables, especially in relation to Aboriginal nutrition. On 18 June 1946, he died at this property Bybera and was buried there.

== Demographics ==
In the 2016 census, Bybera had a population of 3 people.

In the 2021 census, Bybera had "no people or a very low population".

== Education ==
There are no schools at Bybera. The nearest government primary schools are Inglewood State School in neighbouring Inglewood to south-east and Yelarbon State School in Yelarbon to the south. The nearest government secondary school is Inglewood State School (to Year 10) but students in the north-west of the locality may be too distant to attend this school. Also there are no nearby schools providing education to Year 12. The alternatives are distance education and boarding school.

== Notable residents ==
- Eugen Hirschfeld, owned a property in the area and died and was buried there
