= Woondul, Queensland =

Woondul
- Suburb
- Interactive map of Woondul
- Coordinates: 28.0833°S 151.05°E
- Country: Australia
- State: Queensland
- LGA: Toowoomba Region
- Location: 35.4 km (22.0 mi) SW of Millmerran; 78.9 km (49.0 mi) SW of Pittsworth; 117 km (73 mi) SW of Toowoomba CBD; 244 km (152 mi) WSW of Brisbane

Government
  - State electorate: Southern Downs
  - Federal division: Maranoa

Area
  - Total: 116.0 km^{2} (44.8 sq mi)
- Time zone: UTC+10:00 (AEST)
- Postcode: 4357
Suburbs around Woondul
Wattle Ridge	Millmerran Woods	Bringalily
Bulli Creek	Woondul	Bringalily
Kindon	Bybera	Bringalily

Woondul is a rural locality in the Toowoomba Region, Queensland, Australia.

== Geography ==
The north-west of the locality is within the Bulli State Forest and Wondul Range National Park. Apart from these protected areas, there is a small area of crop growing in the east of the locality, but the predominant land use is grazing on native vegetation.

Mount Trapyard is in the south-east of the locality (28.1205°S 151.0792°E) rising to 509 metres (1,670 ft) above sea level.

== History ==
In 1852, the pastoral run Woondul was transferred from Thomas DeLacy Moffat to Henry Stuart Russell. It can be seen as "Woondool" on a map of original pastoral runs on the Darling Downs.

The locality was officially gazetted on 5 April 2012 and is named after the pastoral run.

As at 2021, a pastoral property called Woondul still exists in the area but it is in within the boundaries of the neighbouring locality of Kindon to the south-west.

== Demographics ==
The population of Woodul was not separately reported in the 2016 census nor in the 2021 census, but was included in census reporting of neighbouring Wattle Ridge.

== Education ==
There are no schools in Woondul. The nearest government primary and secondary school (to Year 10) is Millmerran State School in Millmerran to the north-east. There are no schools nearby offering secondary schooling to Year 12; the alternatives are distance education and boarding school.
