= Tarawera, Queensland =

Tarawera
- Suburb
- Interactive map of Tarawera
- Coordinates: 28.115°S 149.6855°E
- Country: Australia
- State: Queensland
- LGA: Goondiwindi Region
- Location: 102 km (63 mi) NW of Goondiwindi; 272 km (169 mi) WSW of Toowoomba; 400 km (250 mi) WSW of Brisbane

Government
  - State electorate: Southern Downs
  - Federal division: Maranoa

Area
  - Total: 518.1 km^{2} (200.0 sq mi)

Population
  - Total: 69 (2021 census)
  - Density: 0.1332/km^{2} (0.3449/sq mi)
- Time zone: UTC+10:00 (AEST)
- Postcode: 4494
Suburbs around Tarawera
Flinton	Westmar	Lundavra
North Bungunya	Tarawera	Lundavra
North Bungunya	North Bungunya	Kioma

Tarawera is a rural locality in the Goondiwindi Region, Queensland, Australia. In the 2021 census, Tarawera had a population of 69 people.

== Geography ==
The Meandarra Talwood Road (State Route 74) runs through from north to south.

The land use is a mixture of grazing on native vegetation and crop growing.

== Demographics ==
In the 2016 census, Tarawera had a population of 39 people.

In the 2021 census, Tarawera had a population of 69 people.

== Economy ==
There are a number of homesteads in the locality:

- Baquabah (28.0031°S 149.6419°E)
- Boxyard (28.2295°S 149.7106°E)
- Buckhaven (28.0935°S 149.7306°E)
- Burloo (28.1351°S 149.6802°E)
- Eaglebar (28.1590°S 149.6852°E)
- Hillview (28.1698°S 149.6380°E)
- Remilton (28.0653°S 149.6537°E)
- Springmount (28.0198°S 149.7155°E)
- Waverly (28.2196°S 149.6056°E)
- Wilga Park (28.0997°S 149.7658°E)
- Willow Glen (28.2010°S 149.6119°E)

== Education ==
There are no schools in Tarawera. The nearest government primary schools are Westmar State School in neighbouring Westmar to the north, Lundavra State School in neighbouring Lundavra to the east, and Kioma State School in neighbouring Kioma to the south-east. There are no secondary schools nearby. The alternatives are distance education and boarding school.
