= ABC Southern Queensland =

Australia
- Broadcast area: Darling Downs
- Frequencies: 747 kHz AM Darling Downs; 104.9 mHz FM Southern Downs

Programming
- Format: Talk

Ownership
- Owner: Australian Broadcasting Corporation

History
- First air date: 17 October 1939

Technical information
- Transmitter coordinates: 27°33′36.67″S 151°56′54.06″E

Links
- Website: https://www.abc.net.au/southqld/

ABC Southern Queensland is an ABC Local Radio station based in Toowoomba broadcasting to the Darling Downs region of Queensland, Australia. This includes the towns of Roma, Warwick, Dalby, Kingaroy and Goondiwindi.

== History ==
The station began broadcasting as 4QS in 1939. As well as a number of low power FM transmitters, the station broadcasts through the following main FM and AM transmitters:

- 4QS 747 AM
- 4QS/T 104.9 FM

== See also ==
- List of radio stations in Australia
