= Goondiwindi Argus =

- Type: Weekly newspaper
- Owner: Australian Community Media
- City: Goondiwindi
- Country: Australia
- ISSN: 1836-1943 (print); 2209-8992 (web)
- Website: goondiwindiargus.com.au

The Goondiwindi Argus is a newspaper published in Goondiwindi, Queensland, Australia. In 2017, the paper edition is published weekly and has an online site. Although published in Queensland, Goondiwindi is a border town and so the newspaper also serves the community south of the border in northern New South Wales.

== History ==
The newspaper commenced in 1882. Over the years, it absorbed a number of other local newspapers including:

- Dirranbandi Despatch
- McIntyre Herald
- South-Western Grazier and Agriculturist

It is a brand of Australian Community Media.
