= Bulli Creek, Queensland =

Bulli Creek
- Suburb
- Interactive map of Bulli Creek
- Coordinates: 27.9833°S 150.8333°E
- Country: Australia
- State: Queensland
- LGA: Toowoomba Region
- Location: 24.9 km (15.5 mi) NE of Kindon; 43.4 km (27.0 mi) SW of Millmerran; 125 km (78 mi) SW of Toowoomba; 282 km (175 mi) WSW of Brisbane

Government
  - State electorate: Southern Downs
  - Federal division: Maranoa

Area
  - Total: 195.2 km^{2} (75.4 sq mi)

Population
  - Total: 0 (2021 census)
  - Density: 0.0000/km^{2} (0.000/sq mi)
- Time zone: UTC+10:00 (AEST)
- Postcode: 4357
Suburbs around Bulli Creek
| Boondandilla | Western Creek | Western Creek |
| Kindon | Bulli Creek | Wattle Ridge |
| Kindon | Kindon | Woondul |

Bulli Creek is a rural locality in the Toowoomba Region, Queensland, Australia. In the 2021 census, Bulli Creek had "no people or a very low population".

== Geography ==
The watercourse Bulli Creek, as which the locality is presumably named, rises in the north of the locality and flows north where it becomes a tributary of Western Creek, then Weir River within the Murray-Darling basin.

The Gore Highway passes through the locality from east (Wattle Ridge) to west (Kindon).

A large part of the north of the locality is within the Western Creek State Forest while a large part of the south of the locality is within the Bulli State Forest. Apart from these protected areas, the land use is a mixture of crop growing and grazing on native vegetation.

== Demographics ==
In the 2016 census, Bulli Creek had a population of 6 people.

In the 2021 census, Bulli Creek had "no people or a very low population".

== Education ==
There are no schools on Bulli Creek. The nearest government primary school is Kindon State School in neighbouring Kindon to the south-west. The nearest government secondary school is Millmerran State School (to Year 10) in Millmerran to the north-east. There is no nearby secondary school providing education to Year 12; the alternatives are distance education and boarding school.
