= Kindon, Queensland =

Kindon
- Suburb
- Interactive map of Kindon
- Coordinates: 28.1116°S 150.8105°E
- Country: Australia
- State: Queensland
- LGA: Goondiwindi Region
- Location: 62.3 km (38.7 mi) WSW of Millmerran; 79.2 km (49.2 mi) NW of Goondiwindi; 144 km (89 mi) SW of Toowoomba; 276 km (171 mi) WSW of Brisbane

Government
  - State electorate: Southern Downs
  - Federal division: Maranoa

Area
  - Total: 610.5 km^{2} (235.7 sq mi)

Population
  - Total: 20 (2021 census)
  - Density: 0.033/km^{2} (0.085/sq mi)
- Time zone: UTC+10:00 (AEST)
- Postcode: 4390
Suburbs around Kindon
Boondandilla	Bulli Creek	Woondul
Wyaga	Kindon	Woondul
Wyaga	Bybera	Bybera

Kindon is a rural locality in the Goondiwindi Region, Queensland, Australia. In the 2021 census, Kindon had a population of 20 people.

== Geography ==
The Gore Highway passes through from north-east (Bulli Creek) to south-west (Wyaga).

The southern and central parts of the locality are within the Whetstone State Forest, but otherwise the predominant land use is a mixture of crop growing and grazing on native vegetation.

== History ==
Kindon State School was opened on 29 January 1963 by Eddie Beardmore, the Member of the Queensland Legislative Assembly for Balonne. He said "Here in this little school is the real wealth of your district - for education is a priceless asset." The school had an initially enrolment 25 students under headmaster Bob Harding.

== Demographics ==
In the 2016 census, Kindon had a population of 19 people.

In the 2021 census, Kindon had a population of 20 people.

== Education ==
Kindon State School is a government primary (Prep-6) school for boys and girls at 14034 Gore Highway (28.0801°S 150.7394°E). In 2017, the school had an enrolment of 6 students with 2 teachers (1 full-time equivalent) and 4 non-teaching staff (1 full-time equivalent).

There are no secondary schools in Kindon. The nearest government secondary school is Millmerran State School (to Year 10) in Millmerran to the north-east. As students living in the west of Kindon might be too distant to attnd this school, the alternatives are distance education and boarding school.
