= Moonie, Queensland =

Moonie
- Town
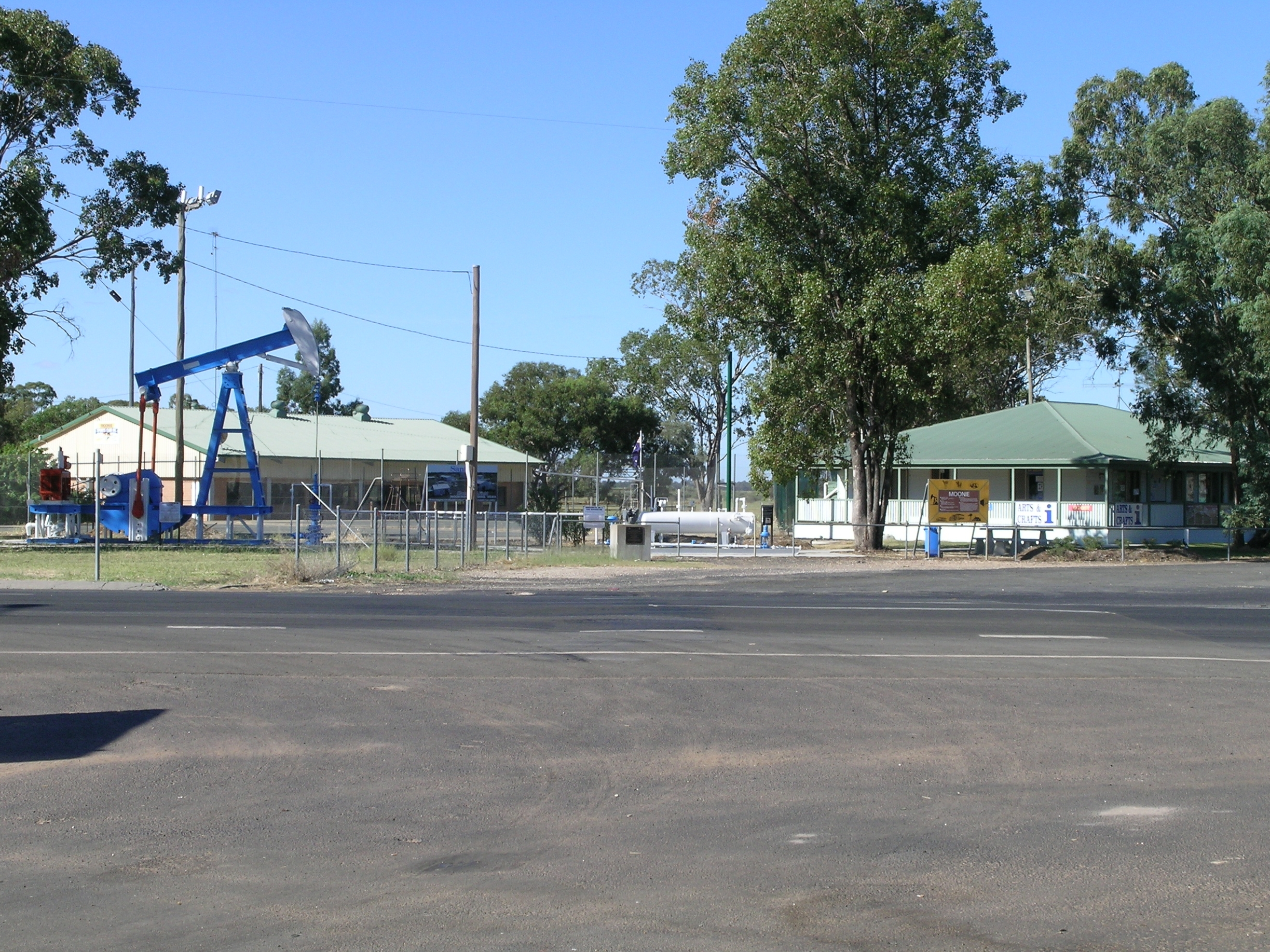
- The playground, craft and information centre at Moonie

- Interactive map of Moonie
- Coordinates: 27.7166°S 150.3702°E
- Country: Australia
- State: Queensland
- LGAs: Western Downs Region; Goondiwindi Region
- Location: 89.1 km (55.4 mi) SSW of Tara; 96.1 km (59.7 mi) N of Goondiwindi; 158 km (98 mi) SW of Dalby; 222 km (138 mi) WSW of Toowoomba; 375 km (233 mi) W of Brisbane

Government
  - State electorate: Warrego
  - Federal division: Maranoa

Area
  - Total: 1,942.5 km^{2} (750.0 sq mi)

Population
  - Total: 182 (2021 census)
  - Density: 0.09369/km^{2} (0.2427/sq mi)
- Time zone: UTC+10:00 (AEST)
- Postcode: 4406
Localities around Moonie
Hannaford	The Gums; Tara	Marmadua
Southwood	Moonie	Weir River
Lundavra	Calingunee	Boondandilla; Yagaburne

Moonie is a rural town in the Western Downs Region and a locality split between the Western Downs Region and the Goondiwindi Region in Queensland, Australia. In the 2021 census, the locality of Moonie had a population of 182 people.

== Geography ==
The Moonie Highway passes through the locality from the north-east to the south-west. The Leichhardt Highway passes through the locality from the north to the south. The town is at the intersection of the two highways.

== History ==
The town's name is derived from Moonie River, which was first recorded as Mooni by Sir Thomas Mitchell in November 1846 when he passed through the region.

Moonie State School opened on 14 May 1962.

In 1973, a church building was moved from Drillham to Moonie to become Our Lady of the Way Catholic Church.

Moonie Post Office opened by June 1966 closed in 1983.

Moonie Library opened in 2003.

== Demographics ==
In the 2016 census, the locality of Moonie had a population of 189 people.

In the 2021 census, the locality of Moonie had a population of 182 people.

== Economy ==
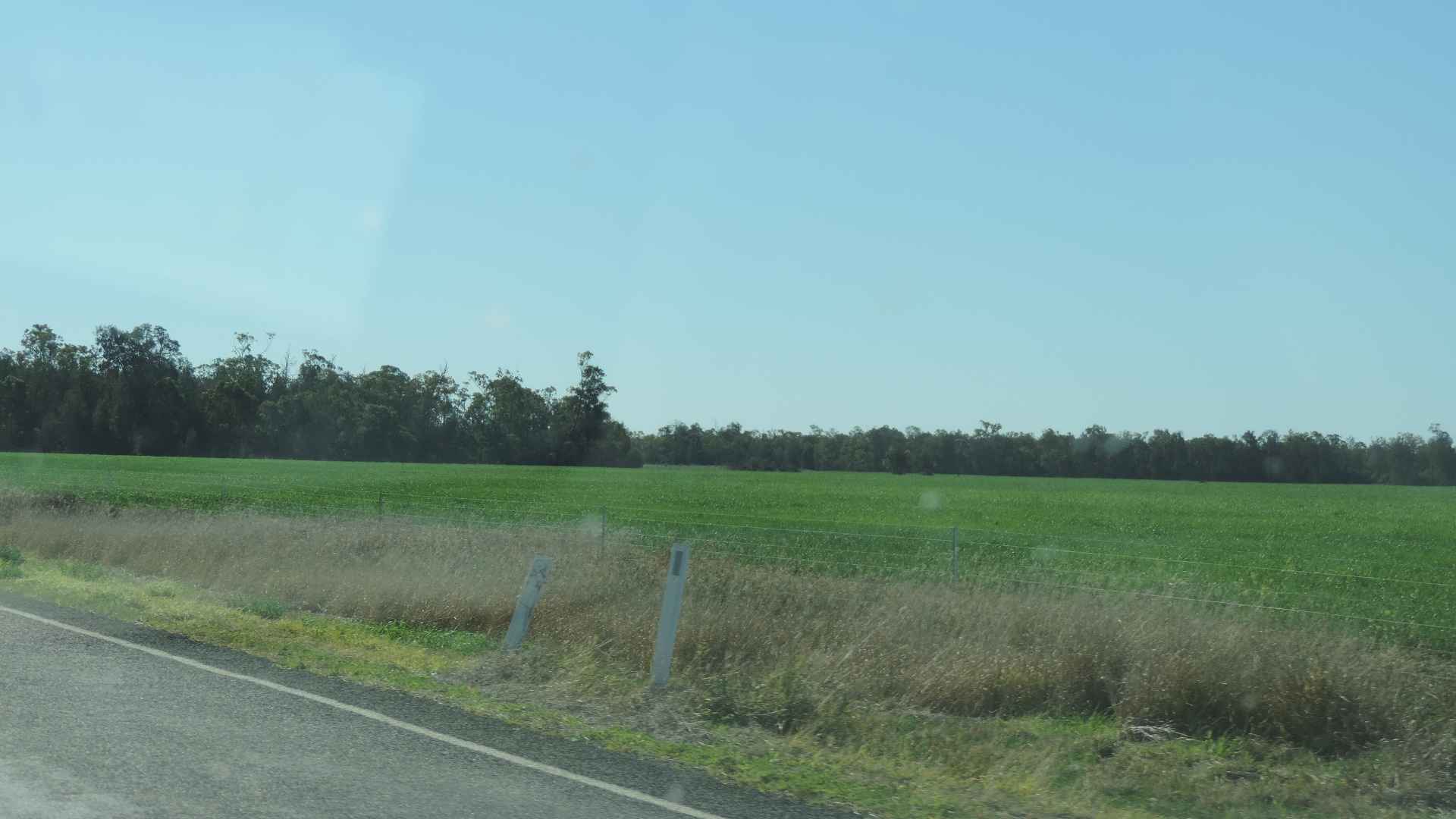
Farm land, Moonie, 2016

In December 1961, Moonie was the site of Australia's first commercial oil field, a very small field consisting of less than one percent of Australia's oil and gas reserves. The oil field is still operational. The region is also an agricultural area that produces grain, beef cattle and prime lambs.

== Education ==
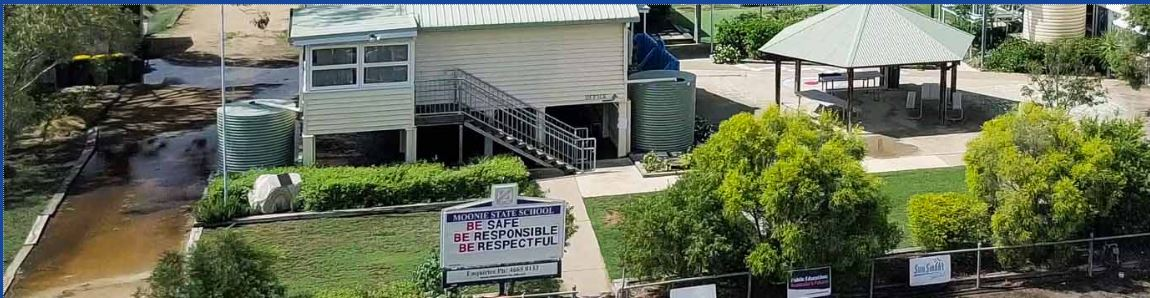
Moonie State School, 2025

Moonie State School is a government primary (Early Childhood to Year 6) school for boys and girls at 11305 Moonie Highway (27.7138°S 150.3732°E). In 2016, the school had an enrolment of 43 students with 4 teachers (3 full-time equivalent) and 5 non-teaching staff (2 full-time equivalent). In 2018, the school had an enrolment of 27 students with 2 teachers and 6 non-teaching staff (3 full-time equivalent).

There are no secondary schools in Moonie. The nearest government secondary school is Tara Shire State College in neighbouring Tara to the north. However, unless resident in the northern parts of the locality of Moonie, the distances involved are so large that distance education and boarding school would be other options.

== Amenities ==
The town has a service station, the Moonie Sports Club, a pool and a motel.

Moonie Library is on the eastern corner of the Leichhardt Highway and the Moonie Highway (27.7172°S 150.3710°E).

Our Lady of the Way Catholic Church is on the Moonie Highway (27.71836°S 150.3672°E). It is part of the parish of St Mary of the Angels' Parish based in Tara within the Roman Catholic Diocese of Toowoomba.
