= Goondiwindi Region =

Coordinates: 28°32′49.7″S 150°18′25.74″E

- Local government area
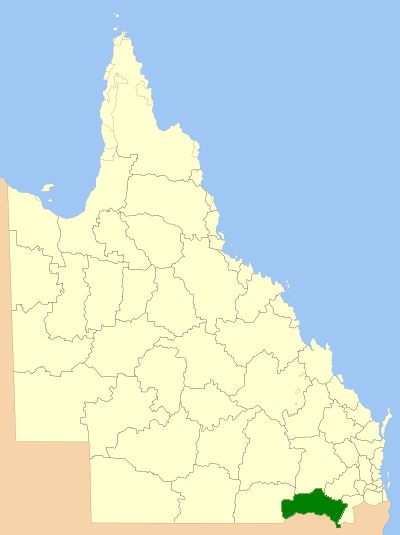
- Location within Queensland

- Interactive map of Goondiwindi Region
- Country: Australia
- State: Queensland
- Region: Darling Downs
- Established: 2008
- Council seat: Goondiwindi

Government
  - Mayor: Lawrence Springborg
  - State electorate: Southern Downs
  - Federal division: Maranoa

Area
  - Total: 19,258 km^{2} (7,436 sq mi)

Population
  - Total: 10,310 (2021 census)
  - Density: 0.53536/km^{2} (1.3866/sq mi)
- Website: Goondiwindi Region
LGAs around Goondiwindi Region
Balonne	Western Downs	Toowoomba
Balonne	Goondiwindi Region	Southern Downs
Moree Plains (NSW)	Moree Plains (NSW)	Inverell (NSW)

The Goondiwindi Region is a local government area located in the Darling Downs region of Queensland, Australia along the state's border with New South Wales. Established in 2008, it was preceded by three previous local government areas which dated back to the 19th century. In the 2021 census, the Goondiwindi Region had a population of 10,310 people.

== History ==
Prior to the 2008 amalgamation, the Goondiwindi Region existed as three distinct local government areas:

- Town of Goondiwindi;
- Shire of Waggamba;
- Shire of Inglewood.

Inglewood and Waggamba began as two of Queensland's 74 divisions created under the Divisional Boards Act 1879 on 11 November 1879. The Municipality of Goondiwindi was proclaimed under the Local Government Act 1878 on 20 October 1888. They became shires, and a town, respectively on 31 March 1903 under the Local Authorities Act 1902.

In July 2007, the Local Government Reform Commission released its report and recommended that the three areas amalgamate. On 15 March 2008, the Town and Shires formally ceased to exist, and elections were held on the same day to elect councillors and a mayor to the Regional Council.

On 17 May 2024, the Queensland Government decided to amalgamate the localities of North Talwood and South Talwood into a single location called Talwood (with the town of Talwood as its main urban area).

== Budget ==
In 2025-2026, the council had an operational budget of $53.89 million and a capital budget of $24.74 million. These figures include $28.09 million from external funds.

== Wards ==
The council remains undivided and its elected body consists of six councillors and a mayor.

== Mayors ==
=== 2008−present ===
No.	Portrait	Mayor	Party	Term start	Term end
1		Graeme Scheu	Independent	15 March 2008	28 March 2020
2		Lawrence Springborg	Independent LNP	28 March 2020	incumbent

== Towns and localities ==
The Goondiwindi Region includes the following settlements:

Goondiwindi area:

- Goondiwindi (town)

Other areas:

- Boondandilla (locality)
- Bringalily (locality)
- Canning Creek (locality)
- Cement Mills (locality)
- Goodar (locality)
- Kioma (locality)
- Mungindi (locality) (part)
- North Bungunya (locality)
- Yagaburne (locality)

Waggamba area:

- Billa Billa (locality)
- Bungunya (town)
- Callandoon (locality)
- Calingunee (locality)
- Daymar (town)
- Kindon (locality)
- Kurumbul (town)
- Lundavra (locality)
- Moonie (locality) (part)
- Talwood (town)
- Tarawera (locality)
- Toobeah (town)
- Weengallon (locality)
- Wondalli (locality)
- Wyaga (locality)
- Yelarbon (town)
- Calingunee State Forest
- Kerimbilla State Forest

Inglewood area:

- Beebo (locality)
- Bonshaw (locality)
- Brush Creek (locality)
- Bybera (locality)
- Coolmunda (locality)
- Glenarbon (locality)
- Gore (town)
- Greenup (locality)
- Inglewood (town)
- Limevale (locality)
- Maidenhead (locality)
- Mosquito Creek (locality)
- Oman Ama (locality)
- Riverton (locality)
- Silver Spur (town)
- Smithlea (locality)
- Terrica (locality)
- Texas (town)
- Warroo (locality)
- Watsons Crossing (locality)
- Whetstone (locality)
- Bringalily State Forest
- Yelarbon State Forest

== Libraries ==
The Goondiwindi Regional Council operate public libraries at Goondiwindi, Inglewood, and Texas.

== Demographics ==
The populations given relate to the component entities prior to 2008.

Year	Region total	Goondiwindi	Waggamba	Inglewood
1933	8,696	1,931	2,468	4,297
1947	9,114	2,467	2,590	4,057
1954	10,359	2,950	2,968	4,441
1961	11,265	3,274	3,123	4,868
1966	10,608	3,529	2,895	4,184
1971	10,253	3,695	2,913	3,645
1976	9,509	3,741	2,539	3,229
1981	9,334	3,576	2,732	3,026
1986	9,859	4,103	2,757	2,999
1991	10,181	4,331	2,898	2,952
1996	9,857	4,374	2,712	2,771
2001	10,348	4,760	2,975	2,613
2006	10,399	4,873	2,951	2,575
2011	10,628			
2016	10,630			
2021	10,310			
