= Goondiwindi State High School =

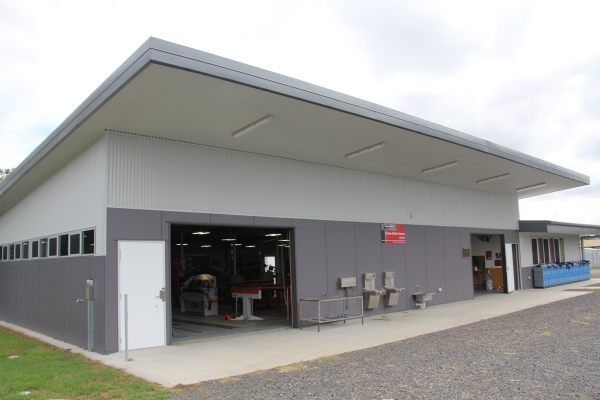
- Goondiwindi State High School, Trade Skills Centre, 2017

Location
- 3-5 Sandhurst Street; Goondiwindi, Queensland; Australia; 28.53702°S 150.29726°E

Information
- Type: State secondary day school
- Motto: I Aspire, I Achieve
- Religious affiliation: Non-denominational
- Established: 1964
- Authority: Department of Education (Queensland)
- Principal: Brett Hallett
- Staff: 50 (Teaching); 27 (Non-Teaching)
- Years: Year 7 – Year 12
- Gender: Co-educational
- Enrolment: 453 (August 2025)
- Language: English
- Houses: Cook; Cunningham; / Mitchell
- Website: Official site

Goondiwindi State High School is a public co-educational secondary school, located in Goondiwindi, Goondiwindi Region (Queensland, Australia). The school is administered by the Queensland Department of Education.

== Name ==
"Gundawindi", the name of the town the school was located in, and thereby the school itself, was derived from the "Gundawindi pastoral run" (c.1838), which in turn was thought to be derived from an expression used by the local Indigenous Australian community referring to 'wild duck' or a 'resting place for birds'.

== History ==
Community advocacy for a dedicated secondary school in Goondiwindi commenced in 1960. The then Queensland Education Minister, Jack Pizzey, at the "State Rural School 1960" speech night, promised “a brand new high school for Goondiwindi when secondary enrolments reached 100, provided 10 students were prepared to continue into senior schooling level”. In the following year this target was achieved, with the school achieving 107 enrolments with 10 students pledging to continue to the senior years. The school was one of the numerous civic improvements to occur in Goondiwindi between the 1920s and 1960s, opening on 28 January 1964, with an enrolment of 178 students by February the very same year.

On 19–20 September 2014, the school celebrated its 50th Anniversary.

The school's Trade Skills Centre was opened in 2016. It provides education in engineering and agriculture, reflecting the economy of the local area.

== Administration ==
As of 2025, the school has a teaching staff of 50 (Full-Tine Equivalent: 47.5) and a non-teaching staff of 27 (Full-Time Equivalent: 19.5). The current principal is Brett Hallett who has been in this position since 2009. The prior principals have been:

Past Principals
Tenure		Principal	Ref
Initial	Final	Principal	Ref
1964	1965	W. Goosens	
1966	1968	Alf Garrone	
1969	1970	A. Matthews	
1971		A. Whitmee	
1972	1975	Barry Thomson	
1976	1977	Dennis Fredrickson	
1978	1979	Kel Barnes	
1980	1985	David Cassidy	
1986	1987	Ian Isaacs	
1988	1989	Leoll Barron	
1990	1992	Paul Tarbuck	
1992	1994	Gary Chew	
1994	2000	Graham Jenkins	
2001	2002	Catherine O’Sullivan	
2003	2008	Alan Smith	
2009		Dean Russell ^{†}	
2009	2020	Brett Hallett	

† - Acting principal, for only semester one.

== Students ==
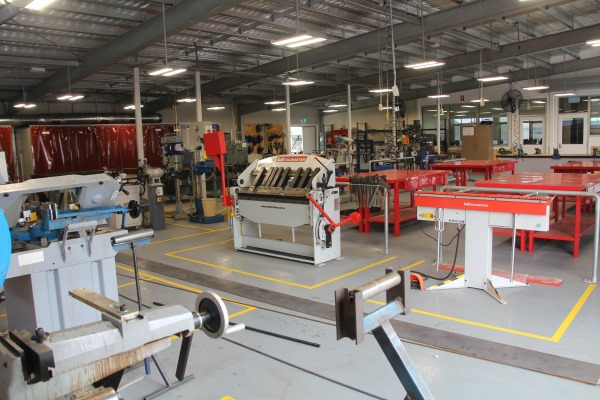
Trade Skills Centre, 2017

In its initial year (February 1964) the school had an enrolment of 178 students. As of 2025, the school has an enrolment of 453 students. The school serves students from Year 7 to Year 12.

Student enrolment trends
Year	Years						Boys	Girls	Total	Ref
Year	7	8	9	10	11	12	Boys	Girls	Total	Ref
2009	-	-	-	-	-	-	238	245	483	
2010	-	-	-	-	-	-	234	236	470	
2011	-	-	-	-	-	-	238	229	467	
2013	-	-	-	-	-	-	221	233	454	
2014	-	-	-	-	-	-	232	245	477	
2015	-	-	-	-	-	-	246	285	531	
2016	-	-	-	-	-	-	253	273	526	
2017	-	-	-	-	-	-	248	250	498	
2018	81	80	88	80	54	77	237	223	460	
2019	91	82	85	78	80	49	241	224	465	
2020	79	95	90	76	76	72	265	223	488	
2021	77	91	97	90	68	65	268	220	488	
2022	84	84	90	99	81	60	260	238	498	
2023	92	86	78	97	85	67	264	241	505	
2024	85	90	80	83	83	79	258	242	500	
2025	TBA	TBA	TBA	TBA	TBA	TBA	235	218	453	
2026	TBA	TBA	TBA	TBA	TBA	TBA	TBA	TBA	TBA	

== Cultural Diversity ==
=== Indigenous ===
The school is located on Bigambul (also spelt Bigambal) peoples traditional Country.

=== Multiculturalism ===
The recent trends in multicultural composition been:

Trends in Multicultural Composition
Year	Indigenous	LBOTE	Ref
2014	11%	2%	
2015	14%	3%	
2016	17%	2%	
2017	20%	6%	
2018	19%	8%	
2019	21%	10%	
2020	22%	10%	
2021	22%	10%	
2022	23%	9%	
2023	25%	8%	
2024	28%	11%	
2025	26%	10%	
2026	TBA	TBA	

== Sports ==
=== Houses ===
The school's three sports houses are named after pioneering explorers of Australia.

Sports Houses
House Name	Explorer	Colour	Ref
Cook	Captain James Cook	Blue	
Cunningham	Allan Cunningham	Red	
Mitchell	Thomas Mitchell	Green / Gold	

== See also ==
- Goondiwindi Region
- List of schools in Darling Downs
- List of schools in Queensland
- Lists of schools in Australia
