= Goondiwindi =

- Town
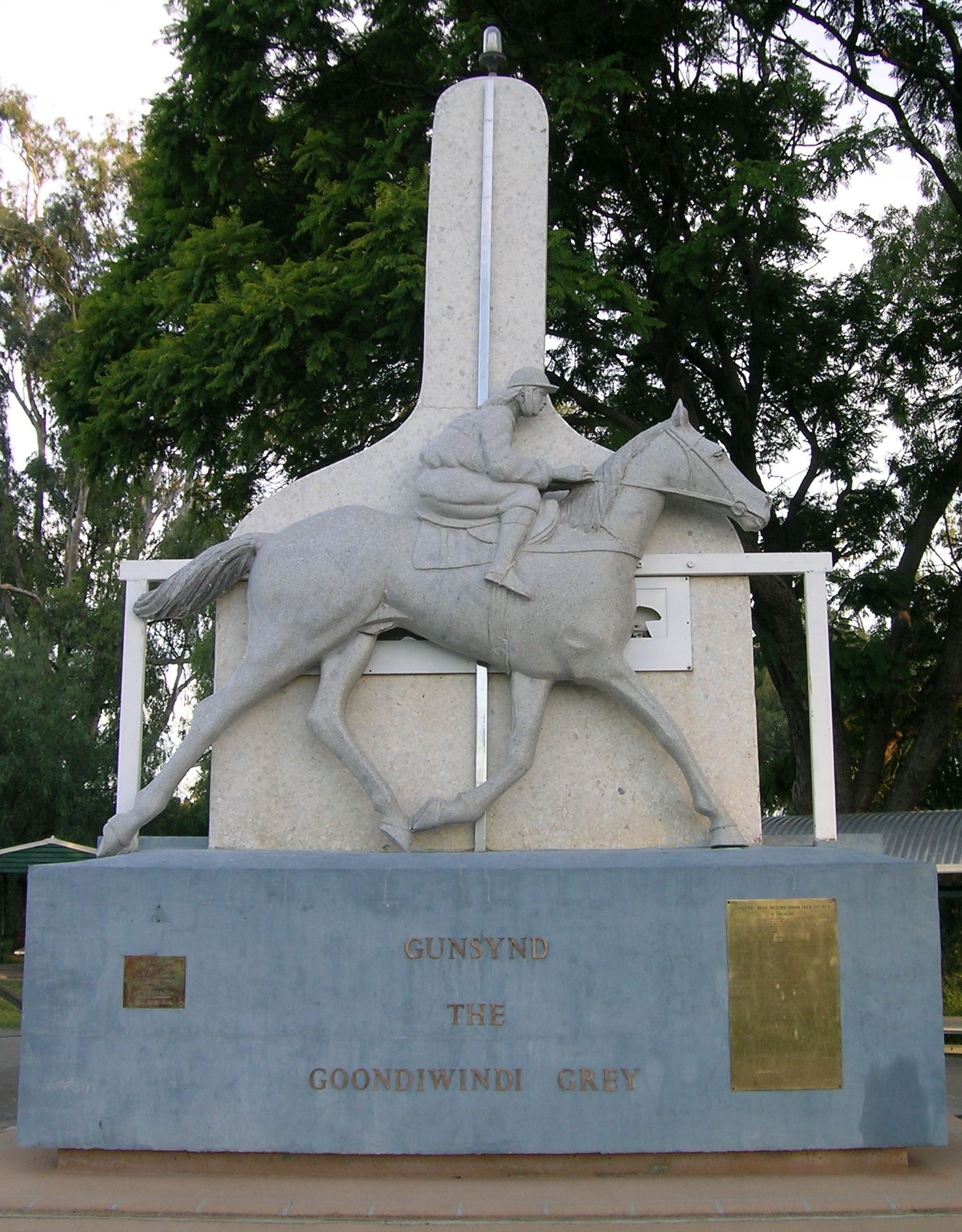
- Statue of Gunsynd, The Goondiwindi Grey

- Interactive map of Goondiwindi
- Coordinates: 28.5461°S 150.3097°E
- Country: Australia
- State: Queensland
- LGA: Goondiwindi Region
- Location: 125 km (78 mi) NE of Moree; 200 km (120 mi) SE of St George; 200 km (120 mi) WSW of Warwick; 221 km (137 mi) SW of Toowoomba; 353 km (219 mi) WSW of Brisbane
- Established: 20 October 1888

Government
  - State electorate: Southern Downs
  - Federal division: Maranoa

Area
  - Total: 830.3 km^{2} (320.6 sq mi)
- Elevation: 217.2 m (713 ft)

Population
  - Total: 6,230 (2021 census)
  - Density: 7.503/km^{2} (19.433/sq mi)
- Time zone: UTC+10:00 (AEST)
- Postcode: 4390
- Mean max temp: 26.7 °C (80.1 °F)
- Mean min temp: 12.8 °C (55.0 °F)
- Annual rainfall: 611.2 mm (24.06 in)
Localities around Goondiwindi
Billa Billa	Billa Billa	Wyaga
Goodar	Goondiwindi	Wondalli
Callandoon	Boggabilla (NSW)	Kurumbul

Goondiwindi (/ɡʊndəˈwɪndi/) is a rural town and locality in the Goondiwindi Region, Queensland, Australia. It is the administrative centre for the Goondiwindi Region. It is on the border of Queensland and New South Wales. In the 2021 census, the locality of Goondiwindi had a population of 6,230.

== Geography ==
Goondiwindi is on the Macintyre River in Queensland near the New South Wales border, 350 kilometres (220 mi) south west of the Queensland state capital, Brisbane. The town of Boggabilla is 11 kilometres (6.8 mi) to the south-east on the New South Wales side of the border. Most of the area surrounding the town is farmland.

=== Climate ===
Goondiwindi experiences a semi-arid influenced humid subtropical climate (Köppen: Cfa), with very hot, moderately humid summers and mild, dry winters. Annual precipitation averages 621.4 millimetres (24.46 in), with a summer maximum. Extreme temperatures have ranged from 45.2 °C (113.4 °F) on 10 January 1899 to −5.6 °C (21.9 °F) on 24 June 1908.

Climate data for Goondiwindi Post Office (28º33'00"S, 150º18'36"E, 217 m AMSL) (1879–1991, extremes 1891–1991)
Month	Jan	Feb	Mar	Apr	May	Jun	Jul	Aug	Sep	Oct	Nov	Dec	Year
Record high °C (°F)	45.2 (113.4)	44.5 (112.1)	42.4 (108.3)	38.2 (100.8)	34.0 (93.2)	31.2 (88.2)	29.4 (84.9)	34.3 (93.7)	36.7 (98.1)	40.4 (104.7)	43.9 (111.0)	45.2 (113.4)	45.2 (113.4)
Mean daily maximum °C (°F)	34.1 (93.4)	33.1 (91.6)	30.9 (87.6)	26.9 (80.4)	22.3 (72.1)	18.8 (65.8)	17.9 (64.2)	20.1 (68.2)	23.9 (75.0)	28.0 (82.4)	31.4 (88.5)	33.5 (92.3)	26.7 (80.1)
Mean daily minimum °C (°F)	19.9 (67.8)	19.5 (67.1)	17.4 (63.3)	13.2 (55.8)	9.1 (48.4)	6.1 (43.0)	4.8 (40.6)	6.0 (42.8)	9.2 (48.6)	13.4 (56.1)	16.6 (61.9)	18.8 (65.8)	12.8 (55.1)
Record low °C (°F)	9.6 (49.3)	6.1 (43.0)	4.7 (40.5)	1.8 (35.2)	−2.8 (27.0)	−5.6 (21.9)	−4.9 (23.2)	−3.3 (26.1)	−2.2 (28.0)	1.1 (34.0)	4.4 (39.9)	7.8 (46.0)	−5.6 (21.9)
Average precipitation mm (inches)	78.5 (3.09)	69.0 (2.72)	59.5 (2.34)	38.7 (1.52)	42.9 (1.69)	40.3 (1.59)	41.9 (1.65)	33.1 (1.30)	39.0 (1.54)	48.7 (1.92)	59.8 (2.35)	69.8 (2.75)	621.4 (24.46)
Average precipitation days (≥ 1.0 mm)	5.8	4.8	4.3	3.2	3.6	3.9	4.2	3.7	3.8	5.0	5.0	5.8	53.1
Average afternoon relative humidity (%)	39	40	42	43	47	52	50	43	38	37	34	36	42
Average dew point °C (°F)	14.8 (58.6)	15.2 (59.4)	14.1 (57.4)	11.2 (52.2)	8.9 (48.0)	7.2 (45.0)	5.7 (42.3)	5.5 (41.9)	6.6 (43.9)	8.9 (48.0)	10.8 (51.4)	13.1 (55.6)	10.2 (50.3)
Source: Bureau of Meteorology (1879–1991, extremes 1891-1991)

== History ==
=== Bigambul people ===
Bigambul (also known as Bigambal, Bigumbil, Pikambul, Pikumbul) is an Australian Aboriginal language spoken by the Bigambul people. The Bigambul language region includes the landscape within the local government boundaries of the Goondiwindi Regional Council, including the towns of Goondiwindi, Yelarbon and Texas extending north towards Moonie and Millmerran.

=== British colonisation ===
The first British pastoralist to take up land in the area was Richard Hargrave who, in 1840, was employed by John Hosking to form a cattle station along the Macintyre River. Hargrave took 5,000 head of cattle and formed the Gundi Windi (Goondiwindi), Callandoon, Wyemoo and Beeboo stations. The name Goondiwindi derives from an Aboriginal word with goondi indicating droppings or dung and windi indicating duck, probably connected with the roosting place on a large rock in the Macintyre River.

Over the following years, the Bigambul resisted the occupation of their lands, attacking Hargrave's livestock and shepherds as well as those of other nearby colonists. In 1843, John Hosking became insolvent but Hargrave stayed on at Gundi Windi until 1844 when he was defeated by Aboriginal resistance and forced to abandon the property.

Around 1848, Richard Purvis Marshall and his brother re-established the Gundi Windi pastoral station with the financial backing of Henry Dangar. Frontier conflict with the Aboriginal people resumed until Frederick Walker and the mounted Native Police under his command arrived in 1849 to crush most of the opposition. In July of that year, Walker and his troopers, accompanied by Marshall and other squatters, routed a large band of Aboriginal warriors at Carbucky, ten kilometres to the west of Gundi Windi. Some reports indicated up to a hundred Aborigines were killed in this skirmish, with Walker expressing that he would have annihilated them all if he had more daylight. This battle ended Aboriginal resistance in the vicinity. Marshall soon after became a Native Police officer, and in 1855 he was appointed Commandant of that force.

=== Township of Goondiwindi ===
On 19 June 1860, the Queensland Government sold town and country lots in the village of Goondiwindi.

Gundiwindi Post Office opened by 1860. It was renamed Goondiwindi by 1861.

Goondiwindi State School opened on 1 September 1864.

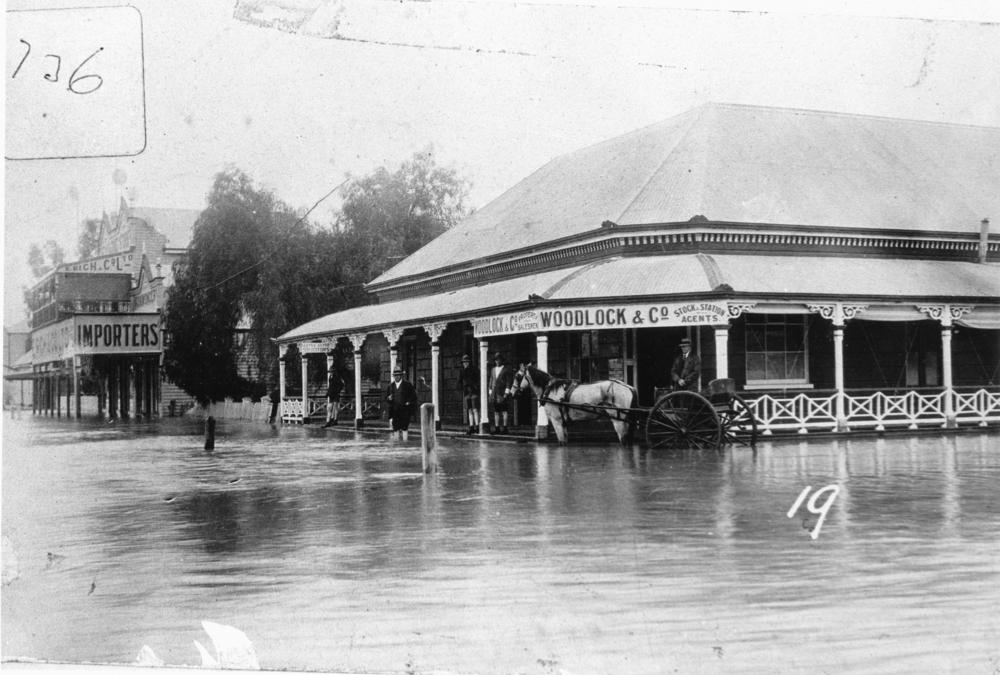
Major flooding affected the town in 1921

Goondiwindi was first proclaimed a municipality on 20 October 1888. The town boundaries have not altered to this day, and, before the Federation of Australia in 1901, the town served as a border crossing between Queensland and New South Wales. The customs house from that era is now a museum.

Goondiwindi East Provisional School opened on 4 July 1898, becoming Goondiwindi East State School in 1909. The school closed about 1914, reopening again in 1920. It finally closed in 1947.

Goondiwindi West Provisional School opened in 1900, becoming Goondiwindi West State School on 1 January 1909. It closed about 1950.

The South Western railway line from Inglewood reached Goondiwindi on 13 October 1908 with the eastern part of the locality being served by Mooroobie railway station (now abandoned, 28.5684°S 150.3769°E) and the town being served by the Goondiwindi railway station (28.5385°S 150.3068°E). The next section of railway line from Goondiwindi to Talwood opened on 4 May 1910, with the western part of the locality being served by Hunter railway station (now abandoned, 28.5103°S 150.2505°E).

Goondiwindi North Provisional School opened in 1901, becoming Goondiwindi North State School on 1 January 1909. It closed due to low student numbers about 1911 but reopened on 24 November 1913 as the Moogoon Road State School. The school closed again due to low student numbers in 1925, but reopened in 1931. It finally closed about 1939.

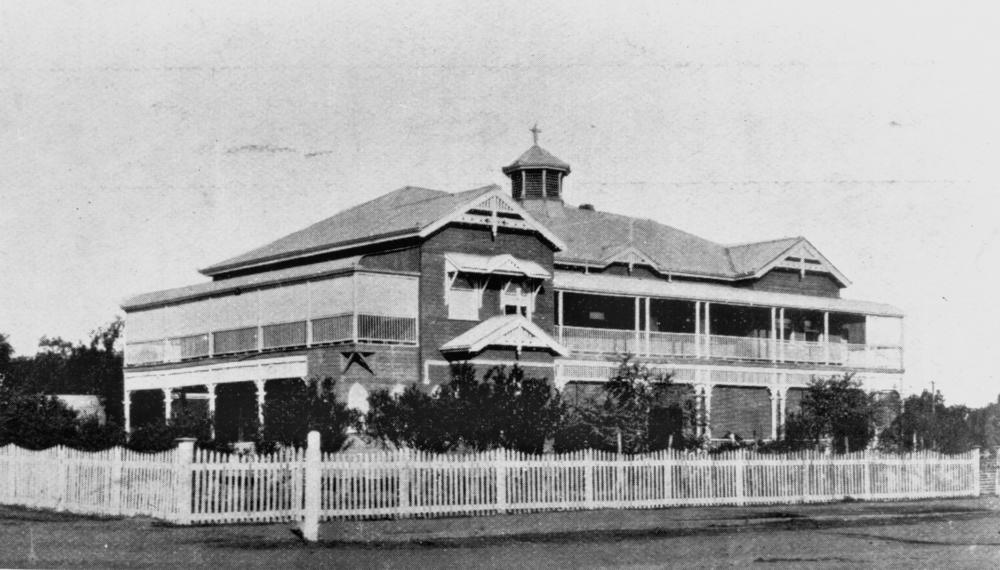
St Mary's Convent and School, 1924

St Mary's Catholic School opened in 1911 operated by the Sisters of Mercy providing for boarding and day students through Years 1 to 7. In 1965, the school added a secondary department to extend the schooling to Year 10 but the secondary department was closed in 1972. The Sisters operated the school until December 1983, after which lay teachers were employed.

On 28 January 1919, the Queensland Government placed restrictions on the border crossing at Goondiwindi to prevent the spread of the Spanish flu into Queensland, which were enforced by the Queensland Police. A medical screening process was used to determine if Queensland residents could safely return to the state.

The Goondiwindi War Memorial was originally located in Herbert Street and was dedicated on 21 September 1922 by the Queensland Governor, Matthew Nathan. The gates were unveiled in April 1949.

Goondiwindi State High School opened on 28 January 1964.

The most famous resident of Goondiwindi was Gunsynd, a Thoroughbred race horse known as "The Goondiwindi Grey". Guided by Bill Wehlow, in the late 1960s and early 1970s, Gunsynd had 29 wins including the 1971 Epsom Handicap and the 1972 Cox Plate and came third in the 1972 Melbourne Cup. The name "Gunsynd" came from Goondiwindi Syndicate (Gun=Goondiwindi, Synd=Syndicate). There is a statue of Gunsynd in the town centre. There is also a Gunsynd museum located in the Goondiwindi Regional Civic Centre at 100 Marshall Street.

Another school, the Goondiwindi Christian Education Centre, opened in 1991 but closed on 13 December 1996.

The Border Rivers Christian College was established in 2015, as a primary and secondary school (P–12) although only P–8 schooling was available in its first year, with Years 9 to 12 classes commencing each successive year. The school commenced using the buildings of the former Goondiwindi Christian Education Centre at 111 Calladoon Street.

The current Goondiwindi Public Library building was opened in 2015.

== Heritage listings ==
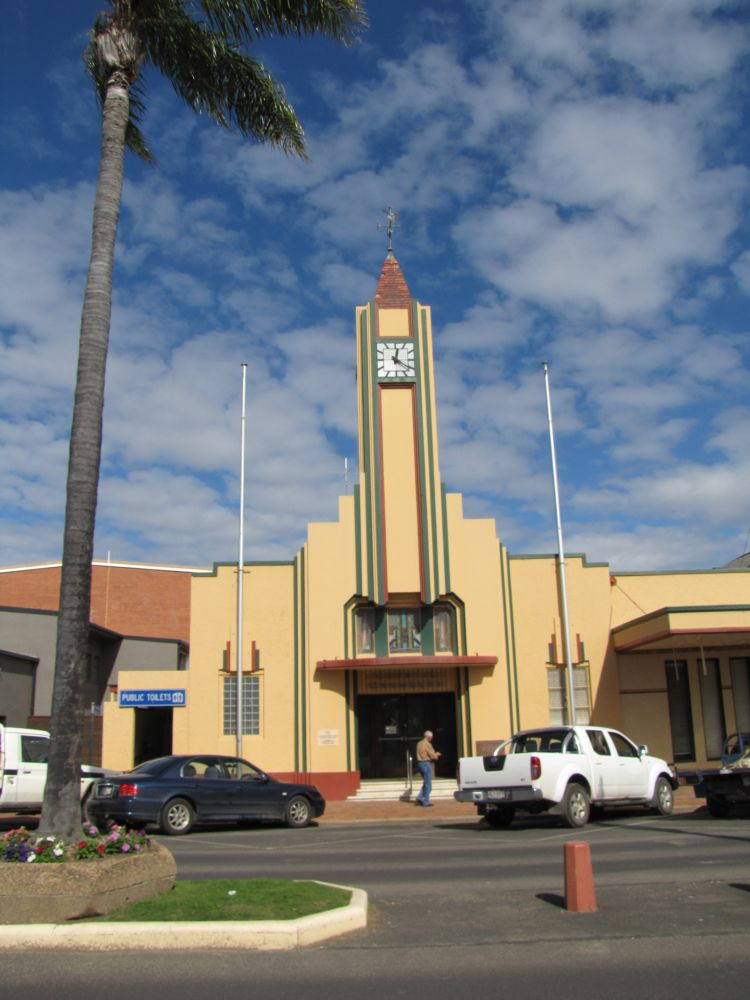
Goondiwindi Civic Centre, 2012

Goondiwindi has a number of heritage-listed sites, including:

- Goondiwindi War Memorial, Marshall Street
- Goondiwindi Civic Centre, 100 Marshall Street
- Customs House Museum, 1 McLean Street
- Wyaga Homestead, Millmerran Road, Wyaga

== Demographics ==
In the 2016 census, the locality of Goondiwindi had a population of 6,355 people.

- Aboriginal and Torres Strait Islander people made up 5.9% of the population.
- 83.1% of people were born in Australia and 86.6% spoke only English at home.
- The most common responses for religion were Anglican 28.9%, Catholic 28.2% and No Religion 15.7%.

In the 2021 census, the locality of Goondiwindi had a population of 6,230 people.

- Aboriginal and Torres Strait Islander people made up 8.1% of the population.
- 84.4% of people were born in Australia and 87.3% spoke only English at home.
- The most common responses for religion were No Religion 26.8%, Catholic 26.1% and Anglican 23.5%.

== Transport ==
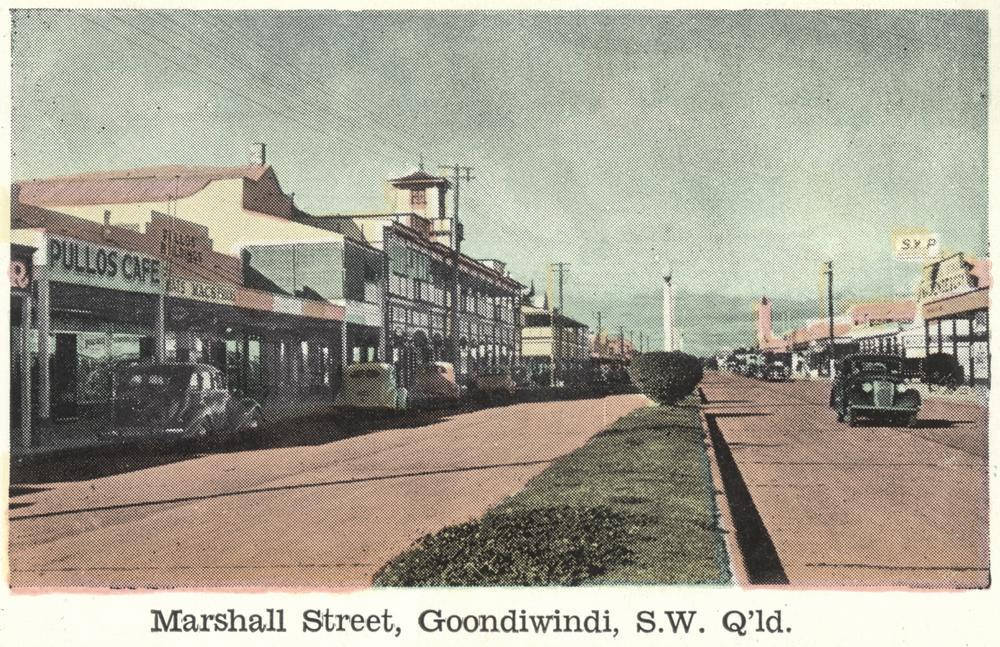
Marshall Street, circa 1945

The town is a major transport nexus between the southern states and Queensland. The Newell, Leichhardt, Gore, Cunningham, Barwon and Bruxner Highways all merge at Goondiwindi or close by. The town is the administrative centre for the Goondiwindi Region. Goondiwindi is a popular stopping point for interstate travellers, and has several motels and restaurants. Goondiwindi Airport is located north of the town off the Cunningham Highway (28.526°S 150.325°E).

== Education ==
Goondiwindi State School is a co-educational government primary school (P–6) at 34 George Street (28.5432°S 150.3062°E). In 2016, the school had an enrolment of 514 students with 45 teachers (37 full-time equivalent) and 23 non-teaching staff (18 full-time equivalent). The school opened on 1 September 1864 and is one of the oldest primary schools in Queensland.

Goondiwindi State High School is a co-educational government secondary school (7–12). In 2016, the school had an enrolment of 526 students with 53 teachers (49 full-time equivalent) with 29 non-teaching staff (20 equivalent). The high school opened on 28 January 1964.

St Mary's Parish School is a co-educational Roman Catholic primary and middle school (P–10). In 2017, the school has an enrolment of 395 students.

The Border Rivers Christian College is a co-educational non-denominational primary and secondary Christian school. In 2017, the school is moving to purpose-built premises in Lilly Street, which are expected to included boarding facilities.

These schools are well-established, have solid community ties, and contribute to the community and surrounding areas. Goondiwindi State High School won the 2006 Showcase award, given to schools which display excellence in all areas.

== Attractions ==
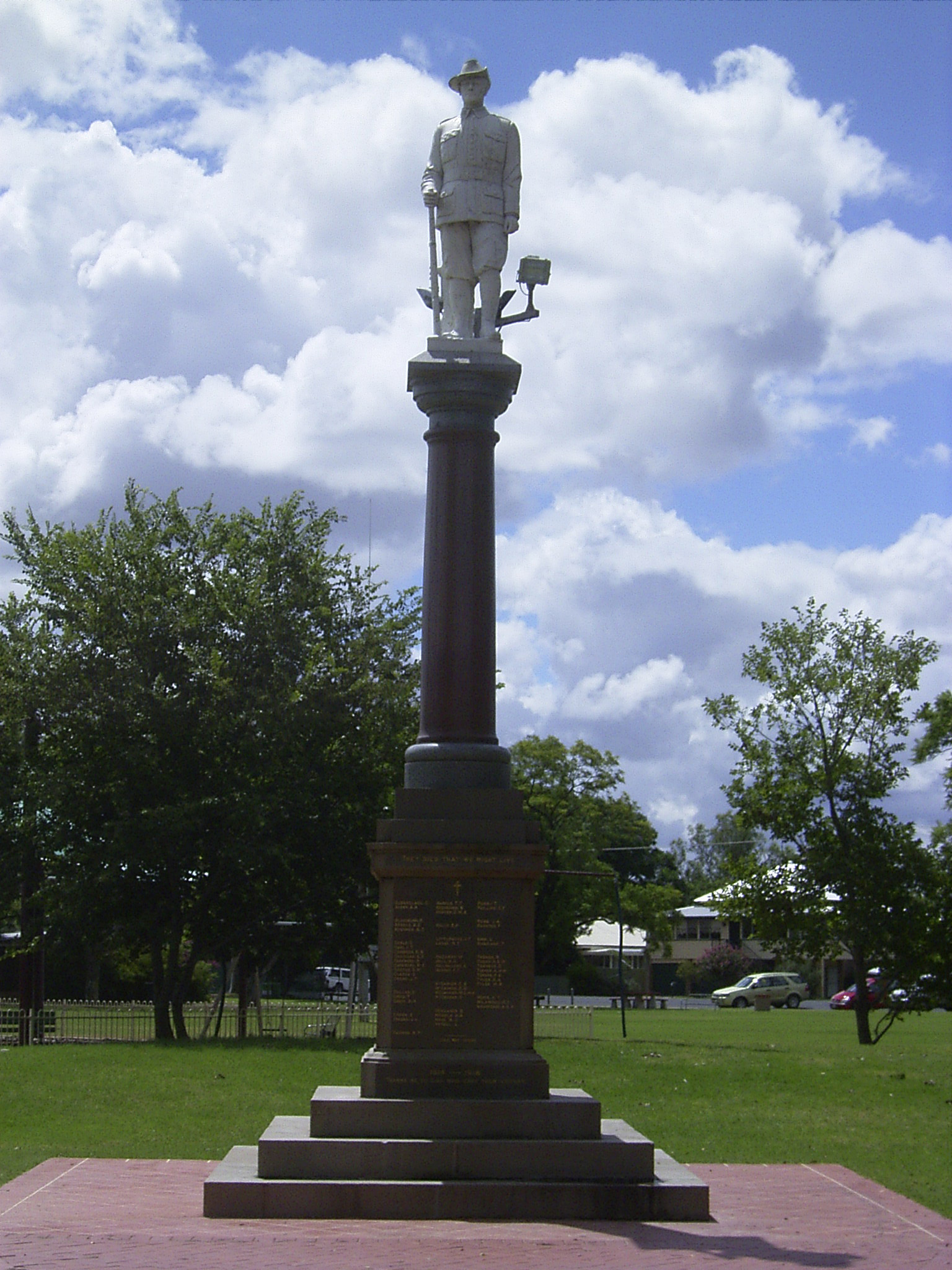
War Memorial Park Monument

Goondiwindi hosts the Natural Heritage and Water Park. The development of the park was the result of the closure of nearby Boobera Lagoon (approximately 20 kilometres (12 mi) west of Goondiwindi) to power boats in order to better preserve artifacts or evidences of indigenous culture. The Lagoon had been a favourite spot for waterskiing for the local area and was the only suitable waterbody for the purpose. The Goondiwindi Town Council petitioned the Australian Government, which responded (through Environment Australia) by funding the National Heritage & Water Park, to make available skiing and boating facilities and to provide a focal point for tourism and recreation in the town and district.

The 210-hectare (520-acre) recreational water park opened in early 2004. The purpose built 3-kilometre (1.9 mi) water channel allows water sports such as waterskiing, wakeboarding, canoeing and boating. It is home to a varied bird life; it provides picnic and swimming areas. Remedial work was performed in 2008 to seal leaks, which caused the lagoon to be dry for a period.

The Goondiwindi Botanic Gardens of the Western Woodlands on the western side of the town features 25 hectares of species native to the Upper Darling Basin. It is unique in that plants are displayed in communities merging into each other as occurs in nature. With the first plantings in 1986, many of the upper-storey large trees are approaching maturity, and the focus is now on mid and lower storey plantings.

The Garden has an extensive Eremophila collection. Some 22 plant communities feature endemic species such as brigalow (Acacia harpophylla), belah (Casuarina cristata), Chinchilla white gum (Eucalyptus argophloia), ooline (Cadellia pentastylis), ironbark (Eucalyptus sideroxylon) and gidyea (Acacia aneura). The planting program is supported by an on-site propagation facility comprising a glass house, heater-mister unit, large shade house and storage container.

Owned and run by the community for the community, the Garden features an island surrounded by a deep lake. An outdoor stage in a tranquil bushland setting is used for performances and social events such as weddings and christenings. Frequent use is made of the shelter sheds and barbeques. The Garden is also the home of the Goondiwindi Dragon Boat Club, and the lake is used by the Goondiwindi Triathlon Club for kids' mini tris and the iconic Hell of the West when river conditions are not suitable for the swim leg.

Goondiwindi has an active sporting community, with rugby union, rugby league, cricket, golf, tennis, Australian football, netball, swimming etc. The town built a large indoor gymnasium for use by the general public and school groups. A major sports highlight is the annual "Hell Of The West" triathlon, in February, which sees entrants from across the country.

Boobera Lagoon is a permanent water hole to the west of the town. Bendidee National Park is located a short drive to the north east of the town.

== Amenities ==
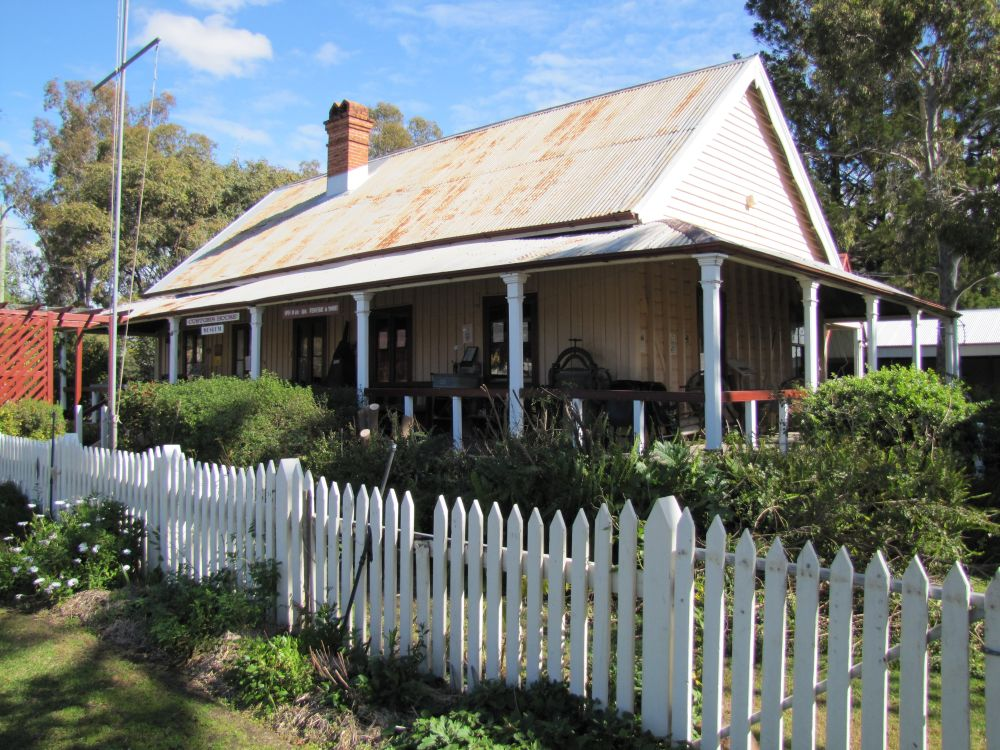
Customs House Museum, 2012

Goondiwindi has a range of facilities open to the general public; these include Goondiwindi Waggamba community cultural centre, swimming pool, art gallery, heritage listed custom house museum and a public library. The Goondiwindi Regional Council operates a public library in Goondiwindi at 100 Marshall Street.

Goondiwindi Uniting Church is at 59 Elizabeth Drive (28.5434°S 150.2978°E). The church was previously at 13 Moffatt Street.

== Media ==
Goondiwindi's weekly newspaper is the Goondiwindi Argus.

There are several radio stations that broadcast to Goondiwindi: ABC Southern Queensland, on 92.7FM, and community based stations, Breeze FM on 98.7, Rebel FM on 96.3, Now FM on 98.3, and 2VM on 89.5 FM.

== Sport ==
Goondiwindi has a rugby union team which compete in the Darling Downs Rugby Union competition. A rugby league team, the Goondiwindi Boars, competes in the Toowoomba Rugby League and many players have gone on to play in junior representative sides, the QLD and NSW Cup, NRL and International Rugby League competitions.

An Australian rules football team, the Goondiwindi Hawks (founded 1980), plays out of the Riddles Oval and competes in the AFL Darling Downs competition.

== Notable residents ==
- Luke Covell – Former NRL and International Player with New Zealand Warriors, Wests Tigers, and Cronulla Sharks.
- Gene Fairbanks – Former Super Rugby Player with the Reds, Brumbies, and Western Force.
- Gunsynd – Famous racehorse known as "The Goondiwindi Grey"
- Ethan Lowe – Former NRL Player with the South Sydney Rabbitohs and won a premiership with the North Queensland Cowboys in 2015. Lowe made his debut for the Queensland State of Origin side in 2019.
- Brayden McGrady – NRL Player with Dolphins.
- Mark Offerdahl – Australian rugby league footballer representing the USA.

== In popular culture ==
In 2020, the town was parodied in the third episode of adult animated series YOLO: Crystal Fantasy. Goondiwindi is portrayed as an outback town hosting the Dusty Truck 'n' Donut Muster, an annual motorsport, music, and food festival. The event turns out to be a trap to lure the protagonist to be sacrificed to a sinkhole in an attempt to bring about an "even muddier" promised land.

== See also ==
- Goondiwindi Border Bridge
- Tomkins incident
