= Shire of Inglewood =

Coordinates: 28.418°S 151.079°E

- Local government area
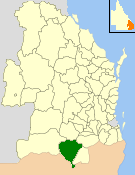
- Location within Queensland

- Country: Australia
- State: Queensland
- Region: Darling Downs
- Established: 1879
- Council seat: Inglewood

Area
  - Total: 5,876.7 km^{2} (2,269.0 sq mi)

Population
  - Total: 2,575 (2006 census)
  - Density: 0.43817/km^{2} (1.13486/sq mi)
LGAs around Shire of Inglewood
Waggamba	Millmerran	Warwick
Waggamba	Shire of Inglewood	Stanthorpe
Inverell (NSW)	Inverell (NSW)	Tenterfield (NSW)

The Shire of Inglewood was a local government area of Queensland, Australia on the Queensland-New South Wales border in the Darling Downs region, about halfway between the towns of Goondiwindi and Warwick. Administered from the town of Inglewood, it covered an area of 5,876.7 square kilometres (2,269.0 sq mi), and existed as a local government entity from 1879 until 2008, when it amalgamated with the Shire of Waggamba and the Town of Goondiwindi to form the Goondiwindi Region.

== History ==
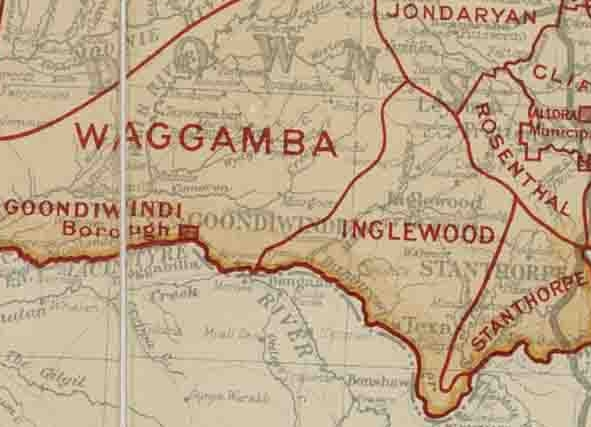
Map of Inglewood Division and adjacent local government areas, March 1902

The Inglewood Division was created on 11 November 1879 as one of 74 divisions around Queensland under the Divisional Boards Act 1879 with a population of 1378.

Following a petition by residents, the Rosenthal Division was created on 18 April 1889 under the Divisional Boards Act 1879 from Subdivision No. 1 of the Inglewood Division.

With the passage of the Local Authorities Act 1902, Inglewood Division became the Shire of Inglewood on 31 March 1903.

On 15 March 2008, under the Local Government (Reform Implementation) Act 2007 passed by the Parliament of Queensland on 10 August 2007, the Shire of Inglewood was merged with the Shire of Waggamba and the Town of Goondiwindi to form the Goondiwindi Region.

Major industries in the Shire included beef cattle, grains, fruit, olives, tobacco, and wool growing.

== Towns and localities ==
The Shire of Inglewood included the following settlements:

Towns:

- Gore
- Inglewood
- Silver Spur
- Texas

State forests:

- Bringalily State Forest
- Yelarbon State Forest

Localities:

- Beebo
- Bonshaw
- Brush Creek
- Bybera
- Coolmunda
- Glenarbon
- Greenup
- Limevale
- Maidenhead
- Mosquito Creek
- Oman Ama
- Riverton
- Smithlea
- Terrica
- Warroo
- Watsons Crossing
- Whetstone

== Chairmen and mayors ==
- 1927: W. J. Tomkins
- 2007–2007: Joan White (first female mayor)

== Population ==
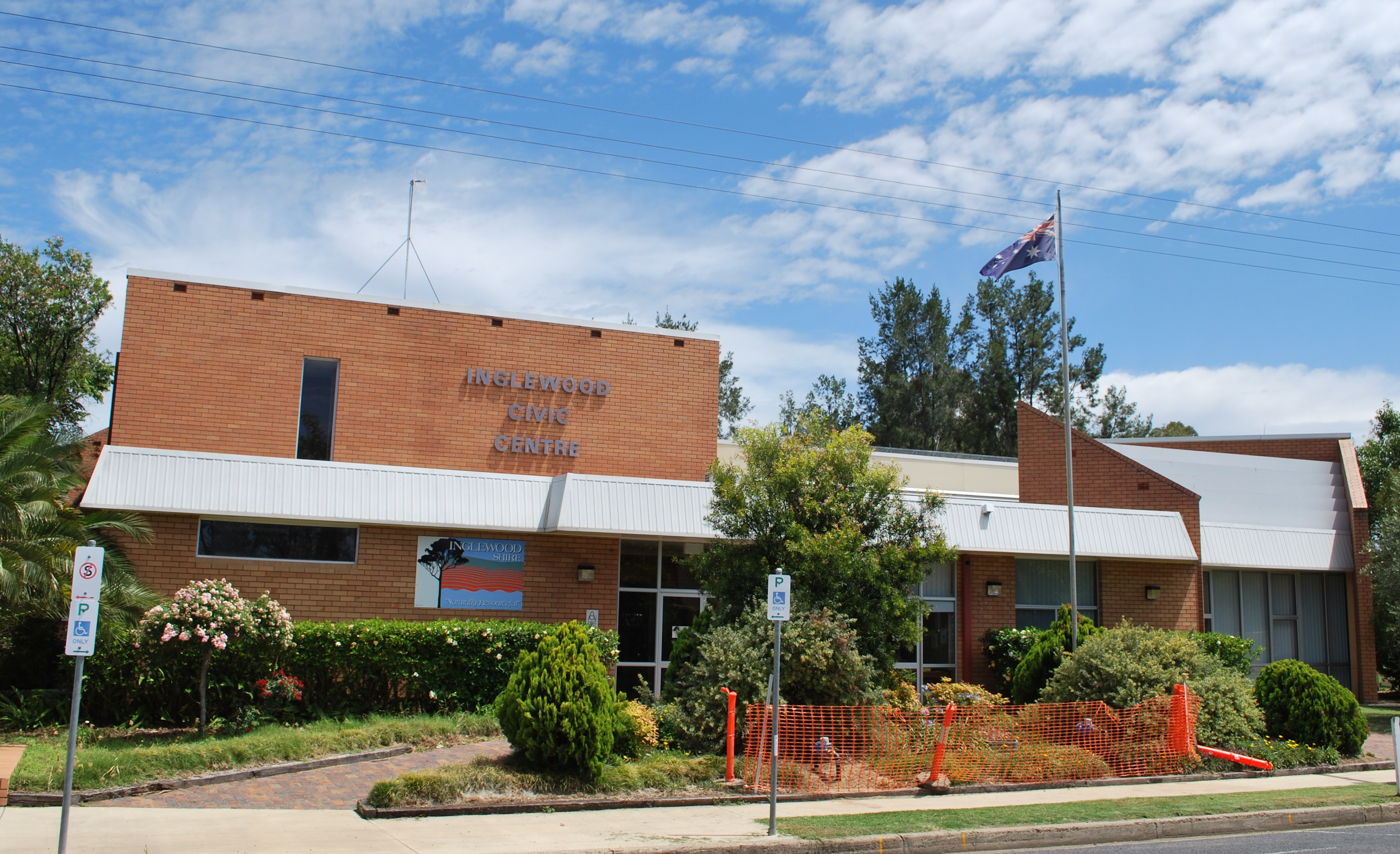
Civic centre at Inglewood

Year	Population
1933	4,297
1947	4,057
1954	4,441
1961	4,868
1966	4,184
1971	3,645
1976	3,229
1981	3,026
1986	2,999
1991	2,952
1996	2,771
2001	2,613
2006	2,575
