= Shire of Waggamba =

- Local government area
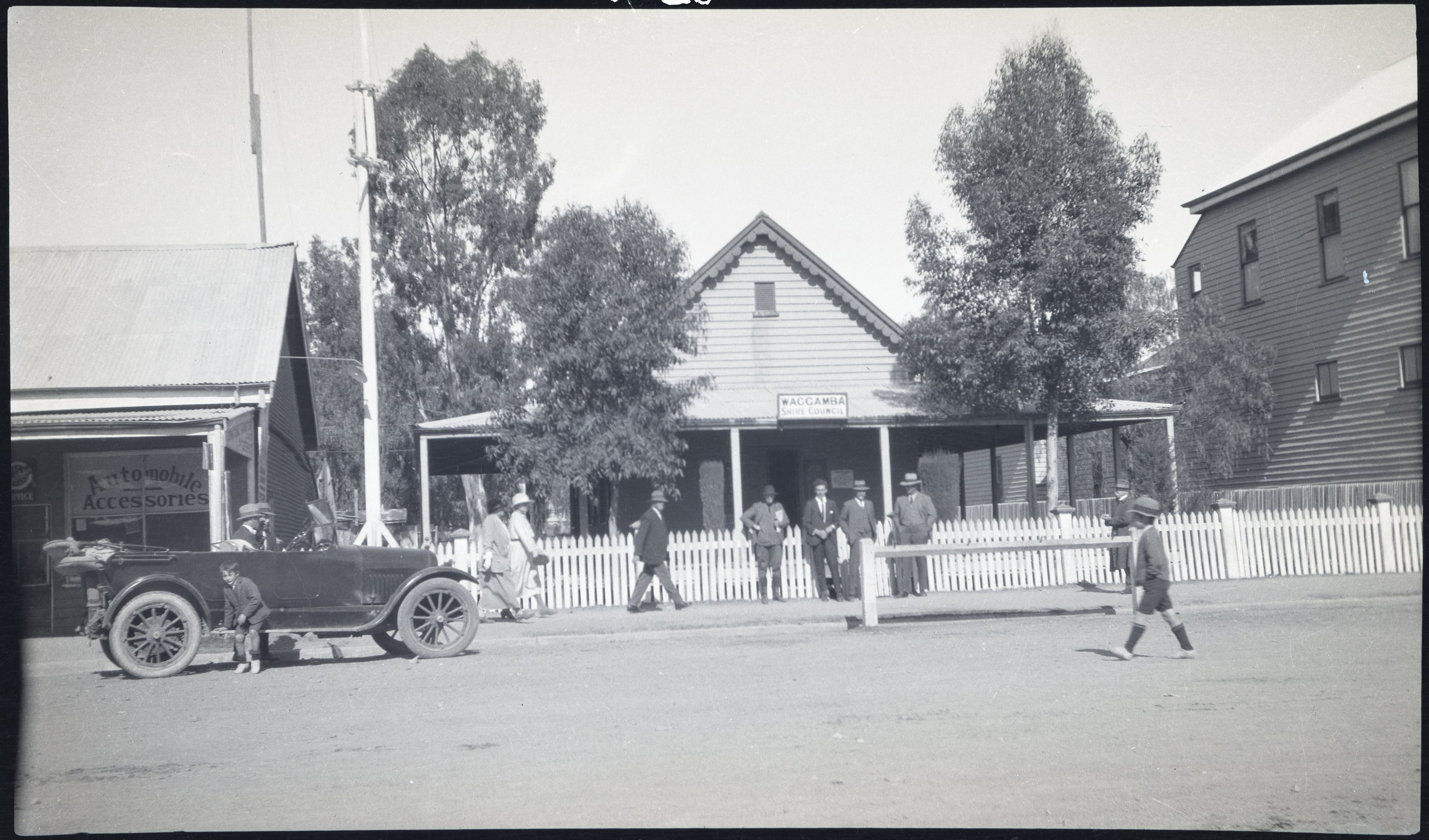
- Waggamba Shire Hall, Goondiwindi, circa 1930

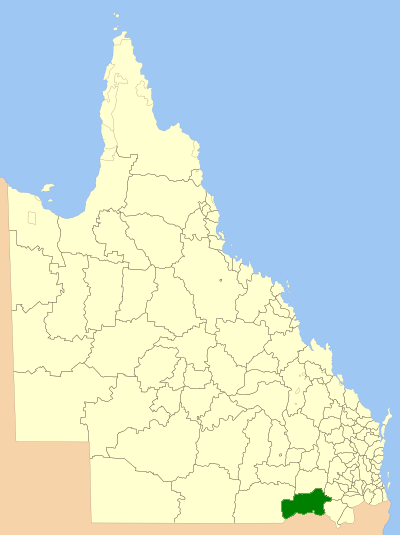
- Location within Queensland
- Country: Australia
- State: Queensland
- Region: Darling Downs
- Established: 1879
- Council seat: Goondiwindi

Area
  - Total: 13,400.8 km^{2} (5,174.1 sq mi)

Population
  - Total: 2,951 (2006 census)
  - Density: 0.22021/km^{2} (0.57034/sq mi)
LGAs around Shire of Waggamba
Balonne	Tara	Millmerran
Balonne	Shire of Waggamba	Inglewood
Moree Plains (NSW)	Goondiwindi	Inverell (NSW)

The Shire of Waggamba was a local government area of Queensland, Australia on the Queensland-New South Wales border in the Darling Downs region, surrounding the Town of Goondiwindi, a separate local government area limited to the town. Administered from (although not including) the town of Goondiwindi, it covered an area of 13,400.8 square kilometres (5,174.1 sq mi), and existed as a local government entity from 1879 until 2008, when it amalgamated with the Shire of Inglewood and the Town of Goondiwindi to form the Goondiwindi Region.

== History ==
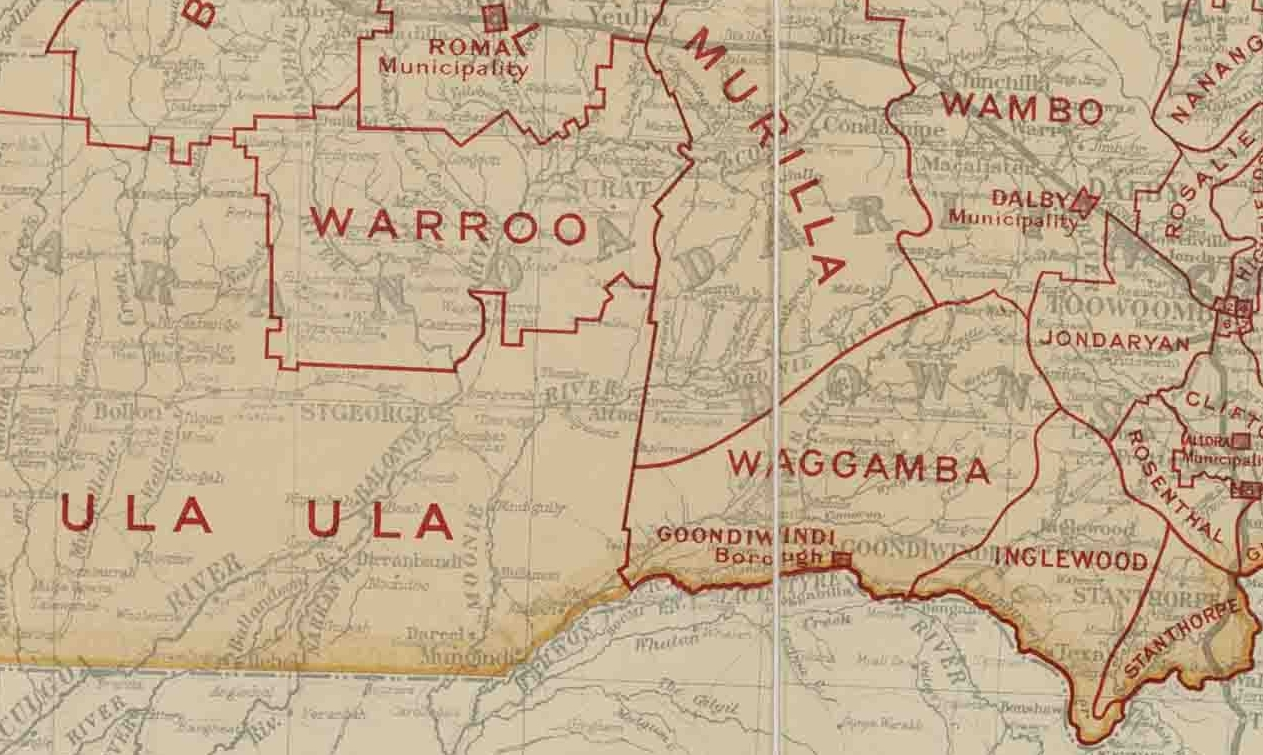
Map of Waggamba Division and adjacent local government areas, March 1902

The Waggamba Division was created on 11 November 1879 as one of 74 divisions around Queensland under the Divisional Boards Act 1879 with a population of 1176. Its headquarters were in the town of Goondiwindi.

In 1888, the urban area of Goondiwindi was excised from the Waggamba Division to create a separate municipality, the Borough of Goondiwindi.

With the passage of the Local Authorities Act 1902, Waggamba Division became the Shire of Waggamba on 31 March 1903.

On 15 March 2008, under the Local Government (Reform Implementation) Act 2007 passed by the Parliament of Queensland on 10 August 2007, the Shire of Waggamba merged with the Shire of Inglewood and Town of Goondiwindi to form the Goondiwindi Region.

== Towns and localities ==
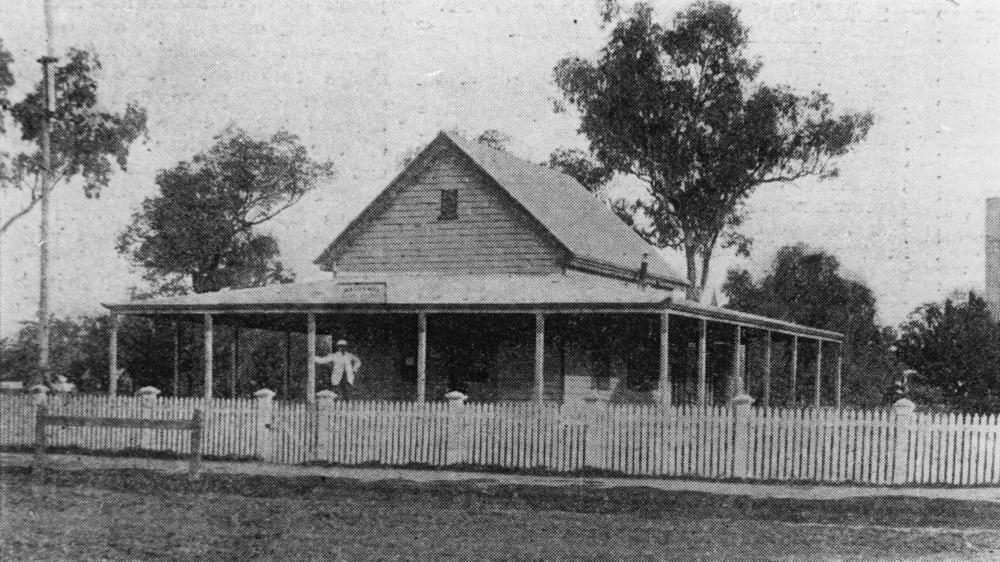
Waggamba Shire Hall, Goondiwindi district, 1905

The Shire of Waggamba included the following settlements:

Towns:

- Bungunya
- Daymar
- Kurumbul
- Talwood
- Toobeah
- Yelarbon

State forests:

- Calingunee State Forest
- Kerimbilla State Forest

Localities:

- Billa Billa
- Callandoon
- Calingunee
- Kerimbilla
- Kindon
- Lundavra
- Moonie
- Tarawera
- Weengallon
- Wondalli
- Wyaga

== Population ==
Year	Population
1933	2,468
1947	2,590
1954	2,968
1961	3,123
1966	2,895
1971	2,913
1976	2,539
1981	2,732
1986	2,757
1991	2,898
1996	2,712
2001	2,975
2006	2,951

== Chairmen ==
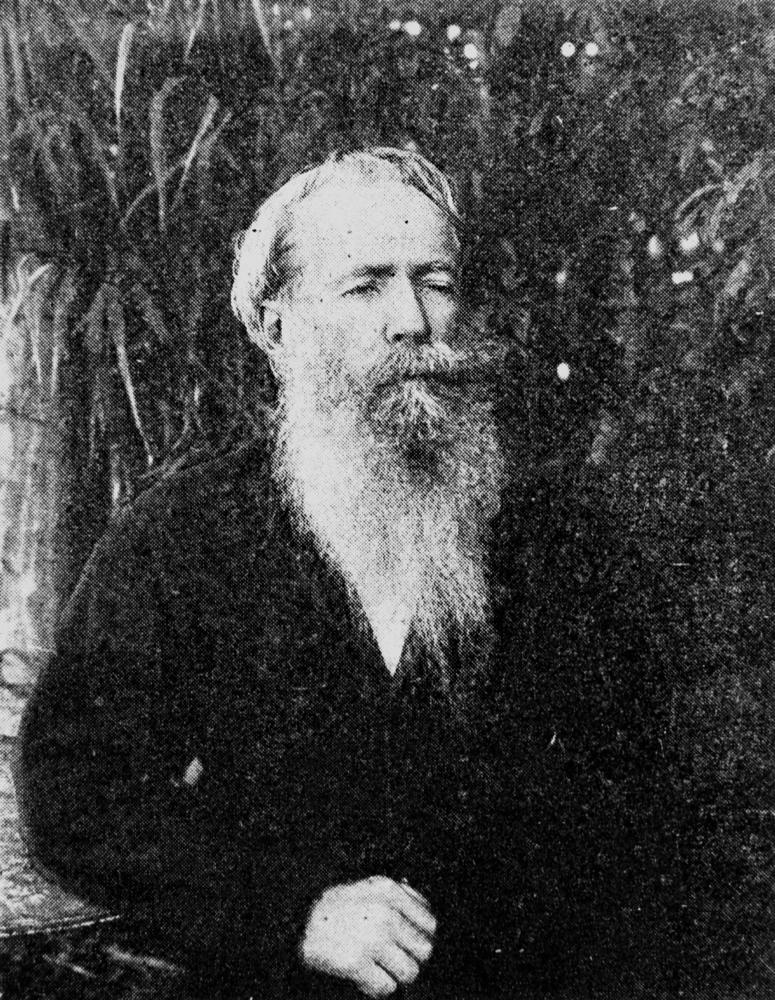
Harry Marshall was the chairman of the Waggamba Shire Council for three years (he had been blind for 45 years when this photograph was taken in 1905)

- April 1890 – April 1900: William James Hooper
- May 1900 – 1901: G.W. Watson
- 1901 – May 1905: Harry Marshall
- 1905 – April 1907: Donald Gunn
- April 1907 – April 1908: J. Gore
- April 1908 – : Richard Hugo Treweeke
- 1927: Donald Weir Oliver McIntyre
