= Bonshaw =

Bonshaw may refer to:

== Australia ==
- Bonshaw, New South Wales, a town
- Bonshaw, Queensland, a locality in the Goondiwindi Region
- Bonshaw, Victoria a suburb of Ballarat

== Canada ==
- Bonshaw, Prince Edward Island, a town on Prince Edward Island, Canada

== United Kingdom ==
- Barony of Bonshaw in North Ayrshire, Scotland
- Bonshaw Tower
