= Mingoola =

Mingoola may refer to:

- Mingoola, New South Wales, a town in New South Wales, Australia
- Mingoola, Queensland, a locality in the Southern Downs Region, Queensland, Australia
