= Mingoola, Queensland =

Mingoola
- Suburb
- Interactive map of Mingoola
- Coordinates: 28.9427°S 151.5330°E
- Country: Australia
- State: Queensland
- LGA: Southern Downs Region
- Location: 50.8 km (31.6 mi) ESE of Texas; 80.8 km (50.2 mi) SW of Stanthorpe; 138 km (86 mi) SW of Warwick; 299 km (186 mi) SW of Brisbane

Government
  - State electorate: Southern Downs
  - Federal division: Maranoa

Area
  - Total: 77.6 km^{2} (30.0 sq mi)

Population
  - Total: 14 (2021 census)
  - Density: 0.180/km^{2} (0.467/sq mi)
- Time zone: UTC+10:00 (AEST)
Suburbs around Mingoola
| Glenlyon | Springdale | Sundown |
| Glenlyon | Mingoola | Back Creek (NSW) |
| Glenlyon | Riverton | Mingoola (NSW) |

Mingoola is a rural locality in the Southern Downs Region, Queensland, Australia. It is on the Queensland border with New South Wales. In the 2021 census, Mingoola had a population of 14 people.

== Geography ==
Mingoola is located on the border of Queensland and New South Wales with the adjacent locality over the border also being called Mingoola.

The Dumaresq River forms part of the border and forms the south-eastern boundary of the locality. The Severn River enters the locality from the north-east (Sundown) and becomes a tributary of the Dumaresq River at the border.

The elevation ranges from 370 to 730 metres (1,210 to 2,400 ft).

The land use is predominantly grazing on native vegetation, except for the lower-lying land around the Severn and Dumaresq Rivers which is used for crop growing.

== History ==
The locality probably takes its name from a pastoral run called Mangoola or Moongoola mentioned in the memoirs of Oscar De Satge.

Land in Mingoola was open for selection on 17 April 1877; 34 square miles (88 km^{2}) were available.

== Demographics ==
In the 2016 census, Mingoola had a population of 18 people.

In the 2021 census, Mingoola had a population of 14 people.

== Education ==
The nearest government primary and secondary school to Year 10 is Texas State School in Texas to the west. There is no nearby secondary school to Year 12; options are distance education and boarding school.
