= Hibbertia mediterranea =

Scientific classification
- Kingdom: Plantae
- Clade: Tracheophytes
- Clade: Angiosperms
- Clade: Eudicots
- Order: Dilleniales
- Family: Dilleniaceae
- Genus: Hibbertia
- Species: H. mediterranea

Binomial name
- Hibbertia mediterranea Toelken

Species of flowering plant in the Dilleniaceae family

Hibbertia mediterranea is a species of flowering plant in the family Dilleniaceae and is endemic to southern Queensland. It is a much-branched, spreading shrub that has glabrous foliage except on new growth, linear leaves, and yellow flowers with thirty to thirty-eight stamens arranged around three carpels.

== Description ==
Hibbertia mediterranea is a much-branched, spreading shrub that typically grows to a height of up to 40 cm (16 in) with glabrous foliage except on new growth. The leaves are linear, 3.5–5.0 mm (0.14–0.20 in) long and 0.5–0.7 mm (0.020–0.028 in) wide on a petiole 0.2–0.5 mm (0.0079–0.0197 in) long. The flowers are arranged singly on the ends of the branches and short side shoots and are sessile. There are leaf-like bracts 2.8–3.2 mm (0.11–0.13 in) long at the base of the flowers. The five sepals are joined at the base, with lobes 7.2–8.2 mm (0.28–0.32 in) long. The five petals are wedge-shaped to egg-shaped with the narrower end towards the base, yellow, up to 10.5 mm (0.41 in) long with 30 to 38 stamens loosely arranged around three carpels, each carpel with four to six ovules.

== Taxonomy ==
Hibbertia mediterranea was first formally described in 2013 by Hellmut R. Toelken in the Journal of the Adelaide Botanic Gardens from specimens collected in Sundown National Park in 1996. The specific epithet (mediterranea) means "remote from the sea" and refers to the species' inland distribution.

== Distribution and habitat ==
This hibbertia grows in forest understorey on the Darling Downs in southern Queensland.

== See also ==
- List of Hibbertia species
