= Sundown, Queensland =

Sundown, Queensland may refer to:

- Sundown, Queensland (Southern Downs Region), a locality on the Darling Downs
- Sundown, Queensland (Cassowary Coast Region), a locality on the north-east coast
