= Sundown National Park =

National park in Queensland, Australia

- IUCN category II (national park)
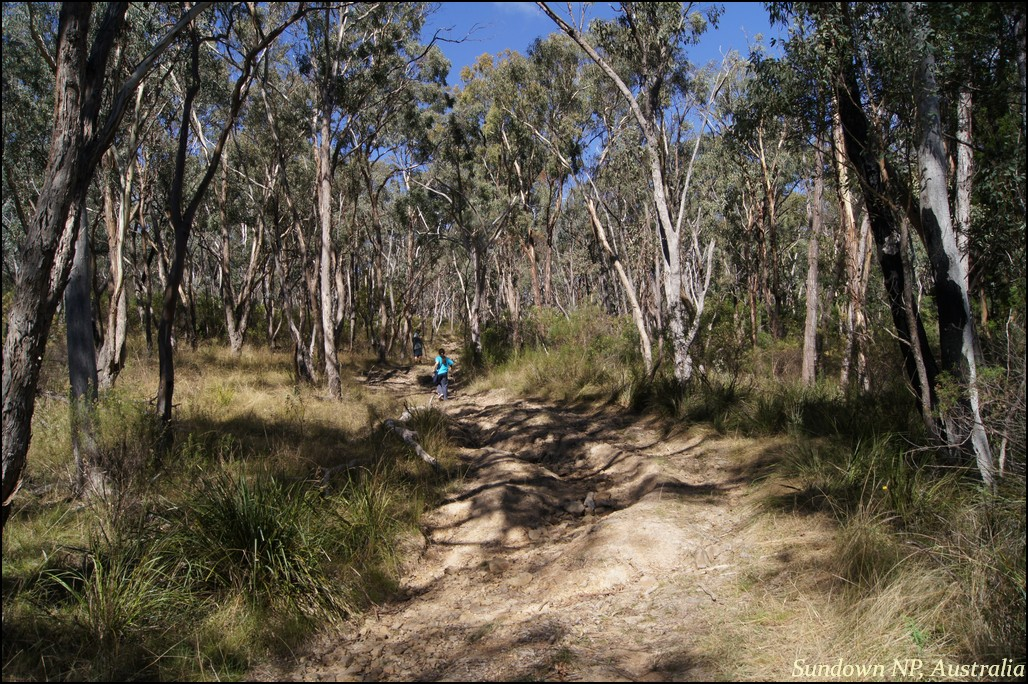
- Walkers in the park

- Location within Queensland
- Location: Queensland
- Coordinates: 28°52′06″S 151°37′07″E
- Area: 160 km^{2} (62 sq mi)
- Established: 1977
- Governing body: Queensland Parks and Wildlife Service
- Website: Official website

Sundown is a national park in Sundown, Southern Downs Region, Queensland, Australia, 250 kilometres (160 mi) southwest of Brisbane. The park contains spectacular gorge country and a number of peaks higher than 1,000 metres (3,300 ft).

== Landforms ==
It is the source of the Severn River, which is the starting point of the Darling River. This Severn River is a separate river from the New South Wales eponymous river. The river has cut a 10 km long gorge through hard trap rock. Some of the Severn River's tributaries have carved gorges and contain waterfalls.

The area has a complex geological history. Before it was a national park the land was mined for molybdenite, arsenic, tungsten, copper, gold and tin. Disused mines are contaminated so access in these locations is restricted. Shellfish fossils can be found on the summit of Mount Donaldson which is 1,038 m above sea level. The trap rock which underlays most of the park contains granite intrusions which has caused some fracturing.

== Flora and fauna ==
In the north of the park stringybark, yellow box, brown box and Tenterfield woollybutt are the most common trees. Along the river red river gum, river oak, tea-tree and bottlebrush are typically found. Some areas of the park were cleared for grazing and the production of wool.

At least 150 species of bird have been noted in the park, including the northernmost population of superb lyrebirds. The park is also home to the most northerly population of wombats along with nearby Girraween National Park. Tiger quolls and platypus are other species that may also be found.

== Facilities ==
In the south east of the park at Broadwater campground there are facilities for camping. Bush camping is permitted. Camping permits and fees apply in both cases. There are a number of short and long walking tracks in the park.

== Western Section ==
Access to the park from New South Wales is via a turn-off into Mingoola Station Road at the Mingoola School, along the Bruxner Highway. Then turn right into Glenyon Dam Road and then another right into Permanents Road, which promptly enters the park. This section is the most developed with the Broadwater Camping Area providing toilets, boil-your-own hot showers (boiler on site), short walking tracks, sheltered tables and taps with river and rain water provided at the ranger station. This section is easily accessible for 2WD and motorhomes/caravans/campertrailers under 5 metres.

== See also ==
- Protected areas of Queensland
