= Town of Goondiwindi =

- Local government area
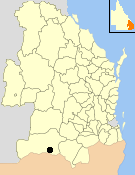
- Location within Queensland

- Country: Australia
- State: Queensland
- Region: Darling Downs
- Established: 1888
- Council seat: Goondiwindi

Area
  - Total: 14.6 km^{2} (5.6 sq mi)

Population
  - Total: 4,873 (2006 census)
  - Density: 333.8/km^{2} (864.5/sq mi)
LGAs around Town of Goondiwindi
Waggamba	Waggamba	Waggamba
Waggamba	Town of Goondiwindi	Waggamba
Moree Plains (NSW)	Moree Plains (NSW)	Moree Plains (NSW)

The Town of Goondiwindi was a local government area of Queensland, Australia. It is on the Queensland-New South Wales border.

== History ==
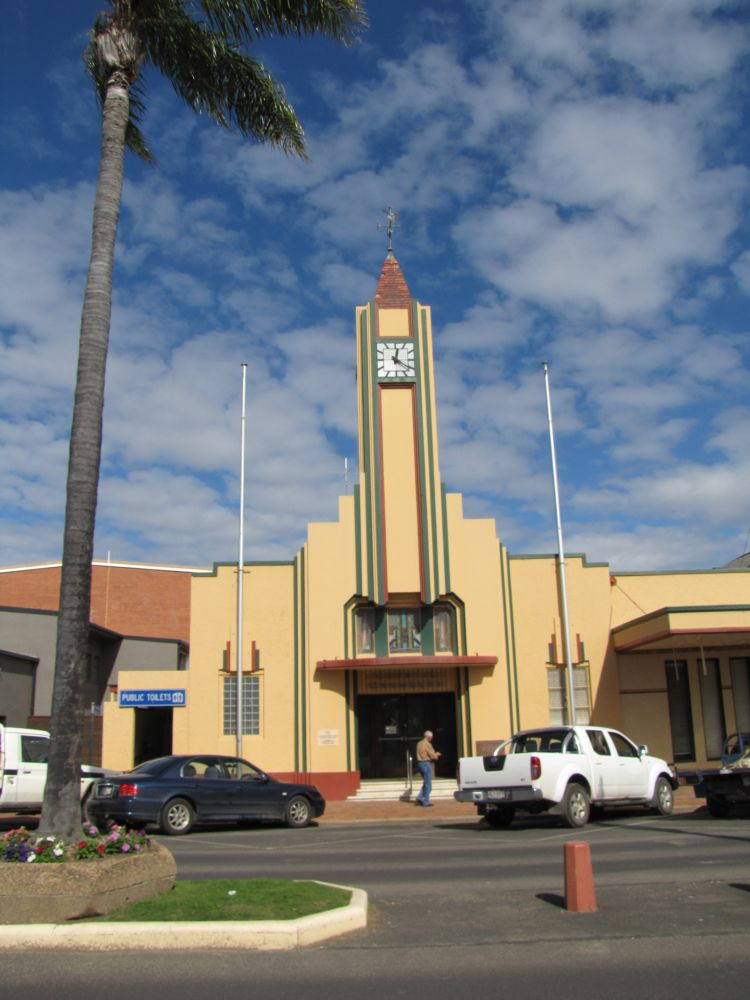
Goondiwindi Civic Centre, 2012

It was first proclaimed a municipality, the Borough of Goondiwindi, on 20 October 1888.

The Shire of Waggamba, also headquartered in Goondiwindi and managing areas to the north, west and east of the town, provided many functions in partnership with the Town, including libraries and area promotion.

In 1937, the Goondiwindi Civic Centre was erected as the town hall at 100 Marshall Street, Goondiwindi. It was designed by Addison & MacDonald and built by Thomas Charles Clarke, now known as The Clarke Services Group. It was added to the Queensland Heritage Register on 9 July 1993.

On 15 March 2008, under the Local Government (Reform Implementation) Act 2007 passed by the Parliament of Queensland on 10 August 2007, the Town of Goondiwindi merged with the Shires of Waggamba and Inglewood to form the Goondiwindi Region.

== Mayors ==
- 1915: J. F. Gibson (for the 5th time)
- 1927: James Dowling Hindmarsh

== Population ==
Year	Population
1933	1,931
1947	2,467
1954	2,950
1961	3,274
1966	3,529
1971	3,695
1976	3,741
1981	3,576
1986	4,103
1991	4,331
1996	4,374
2001	4,760
2006	4,873
