= Watsons Crossing, Queensland =

Watsons Crossing
- Suburb
- Interactive map of Watsons Crossing
- Coordinates: 29.1125°S 151.3255°E
- Country: Australia
- State: Queensland
- LGA: Goondiwindi Region
- Location: 33.9 km (21.1 mi) SSE of Texas; 114 km (71 mi) SW of Stanthorpe; 142 km (88 mi) SE of Goondiwindi; 180 km (110 mi) SW of Warwick; 337 km (209 mi) SW of Brisbane

Government
  - State electorate: Southern Downs
  - Federal division: Maranoa

Area
  - Total: 66.3 km^{2} (25.6 sq mi)

Population
  - Total: 16 (2021 census)
  - Density: 0.241/km^{2} (0.625/sq mi)
- Time zone: UTC+10:00 (AEST)
- Postcode: 4385
Suburbs around Watsons Crossing
Bonshaw	Bonshaw	Maidenhead
Bonshaw (NSW)	Watsons Crossing	Maidenhead
Bonshaw (NSW)	Bonshaw (NSW)	Bonshaw (NSW)

Watsons Crossing is a rural locality in the Goondiwindi Region, Queensland, Australia. It is on the Queensland border with New South Wales. In the 2021 census, Watsons Crossing had a population of 16 people.

== Geography ==
The Dumaresq River (the border with New South Wales) forms the western and southern boundaries of the locality.

Riverton Road enters the locality from the north (Bonshaw) and loosely follows the course of the Dumaresq River but 1 to 2 kilometres (0.62 to 1.24 mi) inland of the river. It exits to the east (Maidenhead).

Watsons Crossing has the following mountains:

- Bowmans Sugarloaf (29.2092°S 151.2415°E)
- Hetheringtons Sugarloaf (29.2123°S 151.3018°E)

The land use is mostly grazing on native vegetation with crop growing near the Dumaresq River.

== History ==
Lagoon Flat Provisional School opened on 30 October 1894. It became Lagoon Flat State School on 1 Jan 1909. It was closed from 5 May 1924 to about October 1924 as families moved away from the area due to the drought. The school closed permanently about June 1926. It was on the eastern side of Riverton Road (29.0919°S 151.2889°E).

Watson's Crossing State School opened on 20 March 1939. It closed on 31 December 1985. It was at the western end of Watsons Crossing Road (29.14195°S 151.32202°E).

== Demographics ==
In the 2016 census, Watsons Crossing had a population of 15 people.

In the 2021 census, Watsons Crossing had a population of 16 people.

== Education ==
There are no schools in Watsons Crossing. The nearest government school is Texas State School (Prep to Year 10) in Texas to the north-west. There are no schools providing education to Year 12 nearby; the alternatives are distance education and boarding school.
