= Pikes Creek, Queensland =

Pikes Creek
- Suburb
- Interactive map of Pikes Creek
- Coordinates: 28.7227°S 151.5416°E
- Country: Australia
- State: Queensland
- LGA: Southern Downs Region
- Location: 47.5 km (29.5 mi) W of Stanthorpe; 50.9 km (31.6 mi) NE of Texas; 107 km (66 mi) SW of Warwick; 168 km (104 mi) SSW of Toowoomba; 266 km (165 mi) SW of Brisbane

Government
  - State electorate: Southern Downs
  - Federal division: Maranoa

Area
  - Total: 120.3 km^{2} (46.4 sq mi)

Population
  - Total: 19 (2021 census)
  - Density: 0.158/km^{2} (0.409/sq mi)
- Time zone: UTC+10:00 (AEST)
- Postcode: 4380
Suburbs around Pikes Creek
| Warroo | Pikedale | Pikedale |
| Warroo | Pikes Creek | Springdale |
| Glenlyon | Glenlyon | Springdale |

Pikes Creek is a rural locality in the Southern Downs Region, Queensland, Australia. In the 2021 census, Pikes Creek had a population of 19 people.

== Geography ==
The locality is bounded to the north-east by Lighthouse Gully and to the south-east by Pike Creek.

The terrain is hilly with elevations of 460 to 740 metres (1,510 to 2,430 ft) above sea level.

The Stanthorpe – Texas Road runs through from north-east (Pikedale) to south-west (Glenlyon).

The land use is predominantly grazing on native vegetation with a small amount of crop growing.

== History ==
The locality was named after a pastoral run, transferred to Captain John Pike in 1852 along with Terica.

Land in Pikes Creek was open for selection on 17 April 1877; 19 square miles (49 km^{2}) were available in Pike's Creek and 9.5 square miles (25 km^{2}) in Pike's Creek North.

Pike Creek State School opened on 21 May 1973 and closed on 10 December 1976.

== Demographics ==
In the 2016 census, Pikes Creek had a population of 26 people.

In the 2021 census, Pikes Creek had a population of 19 people.

== Education ==
There are no schools in Pikes Creek. The nearest government primary schools are Greenlands State School in Greenlands to the north-east and Texas State School in Texas to the south-west. The nearest government secondary schools are Texas State School (to Year 10) and Stanthorpe State High School (to Year 12) in Stanthorpe to the east.
