= Riverton, Queensland =

Riverton
- Suburb
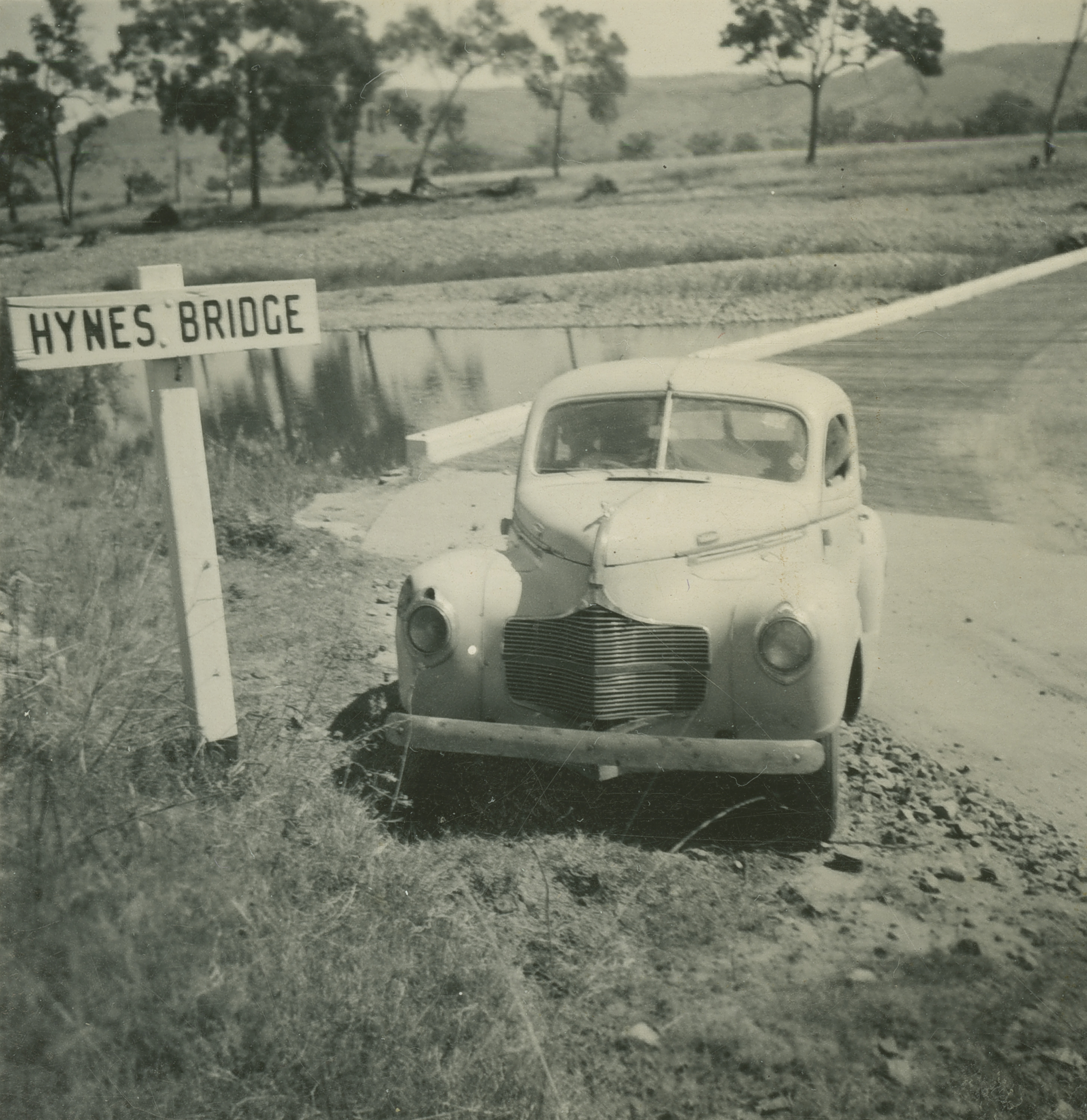
- Hynes Bridge over the Dumaresq River, circa 1950

- Interactive map of Riverton
- Coordinates: 29.0647°S 151.4630°E
- Country: Australia
- State: Queensland
- LGA: Goondiwindi Region
- Location: 68.1 km (42.3 mi) W of Tenterfield; 70.5 km (43.8 mi) SE of Texas; 160 km (99 mi) SW of Warwick; 184 km (114 mi) SE of Goondiwindi; 323 km (201 mi) SW of Brisbane

Government
  - State electorate: Southern Downs
  - Federal division: Maranoa

Area
  - Total: 67.4 km^{2} (26.0 sq mi)

Population
  - Total: 29 (2021 census)
  - Density: 0.430/km^{2} (1.114/sq mi)
- Time zone: UTC+10:00 (AEST)
- Postcode: 4385
Suburbs around Riverton
Glenlyon	Glenlyon	Mingoola
Glenlyon	Riverton	Mingoola (NSW)
Maidenhead	Maidenhead	Dumaresq Valley (NSW)

Riverton is a rural locality in the Goondiwindi Region, Queensland, Australia. It is on the Queensland border with New South Wales. In the 2021 census, Riverton had a population of 29 people.

== Geography ==
The Dumaresq River forms the eastern boundary of the locality and the border between Queensland and New South Wales.

Mount Bowman is in the centre of the locality (29.0685°S 151.4698°E), rising to 509 metres (1,670 ft) above sea level.

Riverton Road enters the locality from the south (Maidenhead) and then runs through the eastern part of the locality loosely parallel with the Dumaresq River before exiting to the north-east (Mingoola). Just off Riverton Road on the Hynes Bridge Road is Hynes Bridge (29.04481°S 151.495411°E), which crosses the river to Mingoola, New South Wales.

The Riverton Limestone Mine and Processing Plant is in the north of the locality off Riverton Road (29.02144°S 151.47318°E). Apart from the mine, the land use is predominantly grazing on native vegetation with some crop growing in the eastern parts of the locality along the river.

== History ==
In the late 1800s and early 1900s, a Cobb & Co coach service from Tenterfield changed horses at Riverton.

Tobacco was an early crop in the district being grown by Chinese farmers from 1881. As it was a profitable crop, by 1901 many farmers were growing tobacco, achieving record prices.

The Hynes Bridge over the Dumaresq River linking Riverton in Queensland to Mingoola in New South Wales opened in June 1941. It was named after J. D. Hynes, the President of the Tenterfield Shire Council in recognition of his work.

Until the 1960s, timber was an important industry for the area with a timber mill at Riverton owned by Rex Weight.

The Riverton Limestone Quarry opened in the 1960s. As it needed electricity, power poles and power lines were erected to link Riverton to the power station at Ashford, providing electricity to the locality.

== Demographics ==
In the 2016 census, Riverton had a population of 10 people.

In the 2021 census, Riverton had a population of 29 people.

== Education ==
There are no schools in Riverton. The only nearby school is Texas State School (Prep to Year 10) in Texas to the north-west. There are no nearby schools providing education to Year 12; the alternatives are distance education and boarding school.
