= Maidenhead, Queensland =

Maidenhead
- Suburb
- Interactive map of Maidenhead
- Coordinates: 29.1194°S 151.385°E
- Country: Australia
- State: Queensland
- LGA: Goondiwindi Region
- Location: 54.6 km (33.9 mi) SSE of Texas; 134 km (83 mi) SW of Stanthorpe; 163 km (101 mi) SE of Goondiwindi; 356 km (221 mi) SW of Brisbane

Government
  - State electorate: Southern Downs
  - Federal division: Maranoa

Area
  - Total: 79.1 km^{2} (30.5 sq mi)

Population
  - Total: 20 (2021 census)
  - Density: 0.25/km^{2} (0.65/sq mi)
- Time zone: UTC+10:00 (AEST)
- Postcode: 4385
Suburbs around Maidenhead
Bonshaw	Glenlyon	Riverton
Watsons Crossing	Maidenhead	Dumaresq Valley (NSW)
Watsons Crossing	Bonshaw (NSW)	Dumaresq Valley (NSW)

Maidenhead is a rural locality in the Goondiwindi Region, Queensland, Australia. It is on the Queensland border with New South Wales. In the 2021 census, Maidenhead had a population of 20 people.

== Geography ==
The locality is bounded to the south and east by the Dumaresq River, which is also the border between Queensland and New South Wales.

Riverton Road enters the locality from the south-west (Watsons Crossing) and loosely follows the course of the river until it exits to the north-west (Riverton).

The land use is mostly grazing on native vegetation with some crop growing close to the Dumaresq River and in the centre of the locality.

== History ==
The locality is named after an early pastoral run, which appears on an 1883 map. As at 2025, there was still a Maidenhead pastoral property in the locality.

Land in Maidenhead was open for selection on 17 April 1877; 21 square miles (54 km^{2}) were available.

== Demographics ==
In the 2016 census, Maidenhead had a population of 14 people.

In the 2021 census, Maidenhead had a population of 20 people.

== Education ==
There are no schools in Maidenhead. The nearest government school is Texas State School (Prep to Year 10) in Texas to the north-west. There are no schools providing education to Year 12 nearby; the alternatives are distance education and boarding school.
