= Sundown, Queensland (Southern Downs Region) =

Sundown
- Suburb
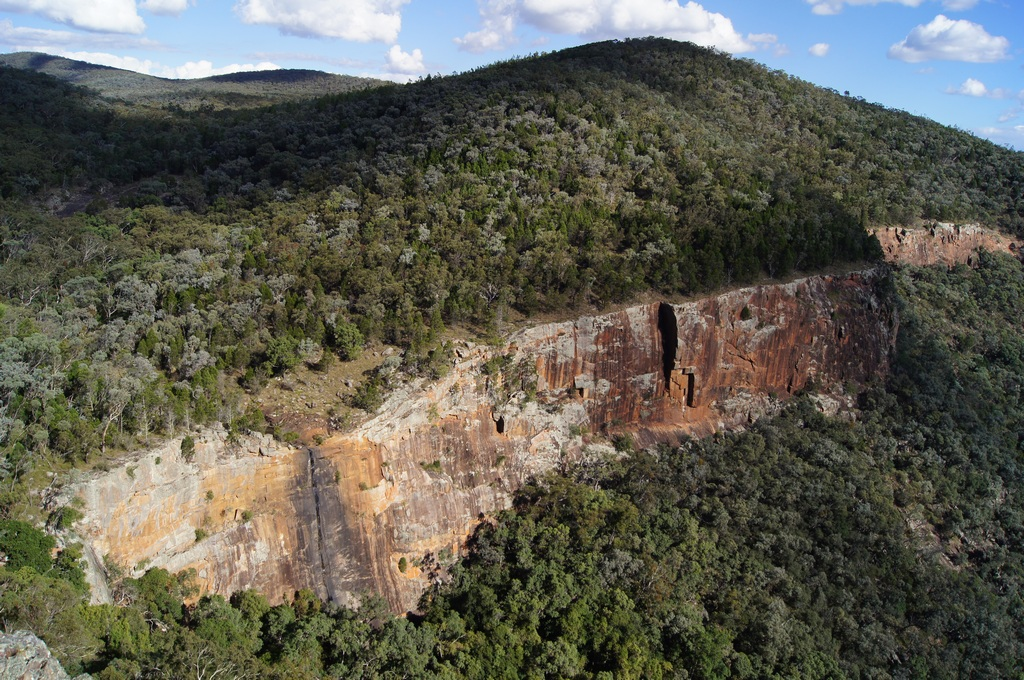
- Red Rock gorge, Sundown National park

- Interactive map of Sundown
- Coordinates: 28.8527°S 151.6658°E
- Country: Australia
- State: Queensland
- LGA: Southern Downs Region
- Location: 33.6 km (20.9 mi) SW of Stanthorpe; 93.0 km (57.8 mi) SSW of Warwick; 176 km (109 mi) S of Toowoomba; 212 km (132 mi) SW of Ipswich; 251 km (156 mi) SW of Brisbane

Government
  - State electorate: Southern Downs
  - Federal division: Maranoa

Area
  - Total: 169.2 km^{2} (65.3 sq mi)

Population
  - Total: 0 (2021 census)
  - Density: 0.0000/km^{2} (0.000/sq mi)
- Time zone: UTC+10:00 (AEST)
- Postcode: 4860
Suburbs around Sundown
Springdale	Springdale	Nundubbermere
Springdale	Sundown	Ballandean
Mingoola	Back Creek (NSW)	Back Creek (NSW)

Sundown is a rural locality in the Southern Downs Region, Queensland, Australia. It is on the Queensland border with New South Wales. In the 2021 census, Sundown had "no people or a very low population".

== Geography ==
Most of the locality is within the Sundown National Park and the Sundown Resources Reserve. Apart from these protected areas, the remaining land in the north-east of the locality is used for grazing on native vegetation.

== Heritage listings ==
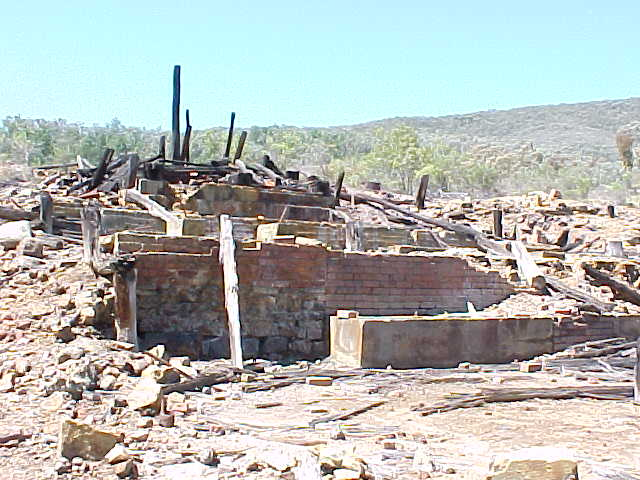
Sundown smelter ruin, 1998

Sundown has a heritage-listed site:

- Sundown Tin and Copper Mine, Little Sundown Creek

== Demographics ==
In the 2016 census, Sundown had "no people or a very low population".

In the 2021 census, Sundown had "no people or a very low population".

== Education ==
There are no schools in Sundown. The nearest government primary schools are Ballandean State School in neighbouring Ballandean to the east, Greenlands State School in Greenlands to the north-east, and Texas State School in Texas to the west. The nearest government secondary schools are Texas State School (to Year 10) and Stanthorpe State High School (to Year 12) in Stanthorpe to the north-east.
