= Sundown Tin and Copper Mine =

Tin and copper mine listed on the Queensland Heritage Register

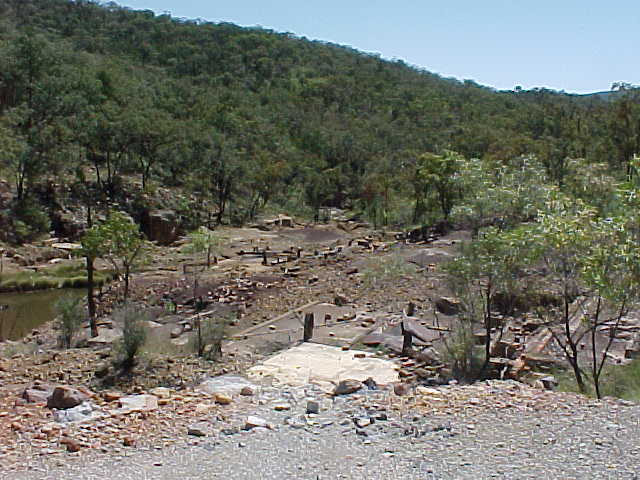
- Sundown smelter ruin, 1998

- Location within Queensland Location within Australia
- 28.8611°S 151.6796°E
- Location: Little Sundown Creek, Sundown, Southern Downs Region, Queensland, Australia

History
- Design period: 1870s–1890s (late 19th century)
- Built: c. 1897–1920s

Queensland Heritage Register
- Official name: Sundown Tin and Copper Mine
- Type: state heritage (archaeological)
- Designated: 28 July 2000
- Reference no.: 602209
- Significant period: 1897–1920s (fabric, historical)
- Significant components: furnace, mine – open cut, mullock heap, adit, flue, machinery/plant/equipment – mining/mineral processing, terracing, slag pile/slag heap, shaft, tailings dump, mounting block/stand, dam/reservoir

Sundown Tin and Copper Mine is a heritage-listed mine at Little Sundown Creek, Sundown, Southern Downs Region, Queensland, Australia. It was operational from c. 1897 to the 1920s. It was added to the Queensland Heritage Register on 28 July 2000.

== History ==
Tin was discovered at Sundown in 1893, and a reward claim was granted for 40 acres, but at that date, there was no machinery on the ground. Mining had ceased in 1894 for want of equipment, and copper prices were at rock-bottom at that time.

The copper and tin deposits were on opposite sides of Little Sundown Creek, and were mined from different shafts. With rising prices the mine was operating again in 1897, and much development work was carried out in 1898. By 1899 a smelter must have been erected, as 470 tons of ore was smelted for 53 tons of matte containing 30% copper and 50oz silver per ton, and 20 men were employed. More ore was raised in 1900, but the mine was under exemption through 1901–1903, a time of low copper prices.

In 1904 the mine was described as having an open-cut on the tin portion, and on the copper section, a tramway ran down 7 chains from the mine to the reverberatory furnace. The only building standing besides the furnace was the assay office. Firewood was swung across the creek to the furnace on wire ropes. The copper adit was driven 270 feet (82 m), with winzes and drives off it, and a shaft connecting to the surface 60 feet (18 m) from the portal. The most recent smelting of 150 tons of ore produced 25 tons of matte containing 29% copper and 76oz silver and 6 dwt gold per ton matte. Mining recommenced in 1904, but was abandoned again in 1907, this time reputedly due to falling tin prices, though copper fell dramatically in 1907 as well. However, Kershaw and Dodds intended to erect a crushing works at the site the following year.

The mine was worked under tribute in 1909–10. In 1911–12 work recommenced, with both copper and tin prices resurging. A road was cut to the site, and a shaft sunk in the bottom of the tin mine, which had previously been mined largely by open-cut. The old smelter was described as still being in good condition in 1913, but mining was clearly slow .

In 1914 the mine was taken over by the Sundown Tin and Copper Mining Company (N.L.) which erected a 10-head battery driven by a suction-gas plant, and built two fines dams. No work had been done for some time on the tin portion, but some had been going on for copper. In 1915 a calciner was erected, together with "another" Wilfley concentrating table and a 5-foot (1.5 m) Berdan crushing pan, and a new shaft was sunk on the tin deposit. The new tin shaft had poppet legs erected over it in 1916, and a 16 hp Tangye winding engine and vertical boiler were installed. That year 69.5 tons of tin and 26 tons of copper concentrates were produced.

Work carried out in 1916–17 included the construction of flues for saving arsenic, the electric lighting of the mines and mill, the construction of a new concrete dam, a new elevated double rope line form the new tin shaft to the mill, new self feeders at the mill, and the redressing works was to be remodelled and shifted from its present location at the mill to the calciner. The battery consisted of the 10 head stamper, 4 classifiers, 5 Wilfley tables, 2 Berdan pans and several buddles. The single reverberatory furnace was used to calcine the tin concentrates and drive of arsenic and sulphur. In 1917 a Merton calciner was erected and flues for arsenic recovery constructed. It is likely that these replaced the old reverberatory furnace and calciner. Arsenic became an important product of the mines, the demand escalating during the prickly pear infestation. New shafts were sunk at both the tin and copper mines. The lack of water reduced output in 1918, only 23 tons of tin and 12.5 tons of copper concentrates being produced, but the new shafts were continued, the three-compartment copper shaft having poppet legs and ore bins erected, and a cableway built to the battery bins. A new reverberatory furnace was built and a water pipeline laid to the Severn River. The Merton Furnace was described in 1918 as being for the roasting of arsenic concentrates, with the arsenic being condensed in 200 feet (61 m) of "mud flues", while the new reverberatory furnace was for copper smelting.

Production in 1919 and 1920 was modest, and in 1921 the smelter treated 100 tons of ore yielding 20 tons of matte containing 37% copper, and 60oz silver per ton. Air compressors and rock drills were obtained, and the calciner and reverberatory furnace were in working order. 30 tons of arsenic and 5.4 tons of copper were produced in 1922, and 200 tons of arsenic in 1923. In 1924 the furnace and part of the mill was leased by Arsenic Limited to O.C Roberts Limited, who remodelled the furnace to treat high-grade ore, as a result of the Prickly Pear Land Commission letting a 12-month contract for the supply of Roberts Improved Pear Poison, which was manufactured at Wallangarra. The ore was to come from the nearby Beecroft Mine.

The arsenic works ceased operation in 1925, and tin does not seem to have been mined after 1923. There is no reference to copper after this date either.

== Description ==
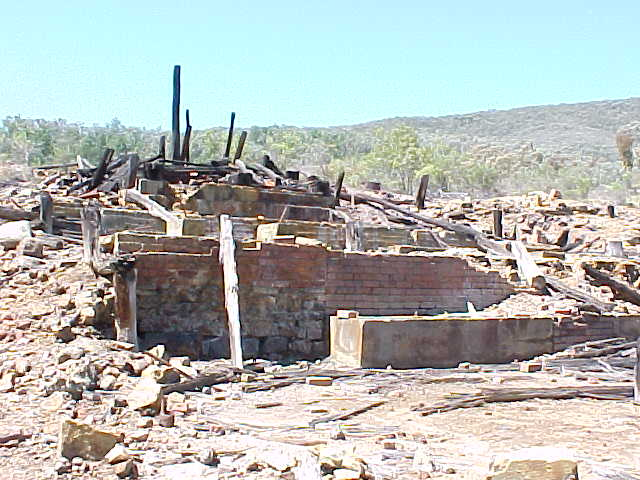
Sundown smelter ruin, 1998

The tin mine area consists of the open cut, with a grided shaft in its floor, and a collapsed adit at the base of its work face. Above the open cut is the main shaft, located on a bench cut into the hillside, with a mullock tip, tripod steel poppet head and older timber shaft- head staging, over a three-compartment shaft. The concrete pad supporting one of the poppet legs is inscribed with the names "T Fredrick, S. Lynn, F. Meehan, GRM Kane". Adjacent to the shaft is a cutting dug into the wall of the benched area, which appears to have been used as a store or crib room. On the other side of the shaft is a bench cut into the slope, with a "Herman" winding engine facing the poppet legs.

The mill area consists of two sets of stepped concrete floors, identified on plans as the "New Works" (29.5 by 6.5 metres (97 ft × 21 ft)), and the "Old Works" 42 by 9 metres (138 ft × 30 ft), 24 metres (79 ft) further to the west. These concrete floors have concrete machinery foundations, troughs and the bases of timber vats or tanks. The Old Works has the foundations for a stamper battery.

The ruin of a furnace, taken to be the Merton Furnace for arsenic roasting, is located above the New Works area, and consists of a collapsed large brick furnace, built with "Campbell" fire bricks, with a horseshoe-shaped flue leading from it. The flue, which is collapsed, was an above ground 1.8-metre (5 ft 11 in) wide vault tunnel, and approximately the 200-foot (61 m) length referred to in the literature. The height could not be determined. At the other end of the flue from the furnace is a large brick pile and 14-metre (46 ft) long plume of rubble consisting of a fallen chimney. The curve of the flue is supported on a platform built of stone, and a large number of 2.95-metre-long (9.7 ft) iron pipes lay scattered in this area. There is slag underlying part of the furnace, and it may have been built on top of the first reverberatory furnace slag heap.

Between the "arms" of the flue is an area of burnt and disturbed ground, which may be the site of the second reverberatory furnace, as a 12-by-19-metre (39 ft × 62 ft) slag heap extends from in front of this area. No ground features indicating the size or specific design of this smelter could be seen, but the loaf slag forms indicate the slag was cast into sand moulds, typical of reverberatory furnace practice.

East of the furnace are a number of sleepers, lengths of wire cable, and the base of the structure which could be the flying fox used to bring tin and copper ore to the mill site. However, this area of the site has been extensively disturbed by more recent bulldozing and earth moving activities.

The two dams are located below the Old Works site, and are earthen dams, riveted with timber on the downstream side, and both are broken. A large amount of tailings sand lines the creek above the dams, leaching the metallic salts and having a strongly sulphurous smell.

The Copper Mines are located about 140 metres (460 ft) east of the furnace site, and consist an adit near the creek, and a series of 3 shafts along the line of the reef running roughly s-w to n-e over the crest of the ridge, and mullock associated with the shafts. The main shaft is a three-compartment shaft. There is a collapsed ore bin and shute, and some concrete machinery pads, but no other substantial above-ground remains.

== Heritage listing ==
Sundown Tin and Copper Mine was listed on the Queensland Heritage Register on 28 July 2000 having satisfied the following criteria.

The place is important in demonstrating the evolution or pattern of Queensland's history.

The Sundown Mine is of historical importance because of its combination of tin, copper and arsenic production, the primary product at any given time varying with the prevailing market condition. Thus at one site is a microcosm of the forces influencing the pattern of most mining in this region of southern Queensland. The Sundown Mine together with the Beecroft Mine and the Jibbenbar State Arsenic Works, is associated with the prickly pear eradication program.

The place demonstrates rare, uncommon or endangered aspects of Queensland's cultural heritage.

The remains of the Merton Furnace and condensing flue are rare pieces of the technology demonstrating arsenic extraction in Queensland. The arsenic mill and furnace, together with the nearby Jibbenbar and Beecroft mines, demonstrates a rare aspect of mining in Queensland, and the fact that the mine was aimed at producing toxic material puts the site at considerable risk from future contaminated site rehabilitation, so it is endangered.

The place has potential to yield information that will contribute to an understanding of Queensland's history.

The site has the potential to yield information about the highly volatile base metal mines industry. The combination of metals produced at the mine increases the potential of the site to contribute worthwhile research results.

== See also ==
- List of tramways in Queensland
