= Glenlyon, Queensland =

Glenlyon
- Suburb
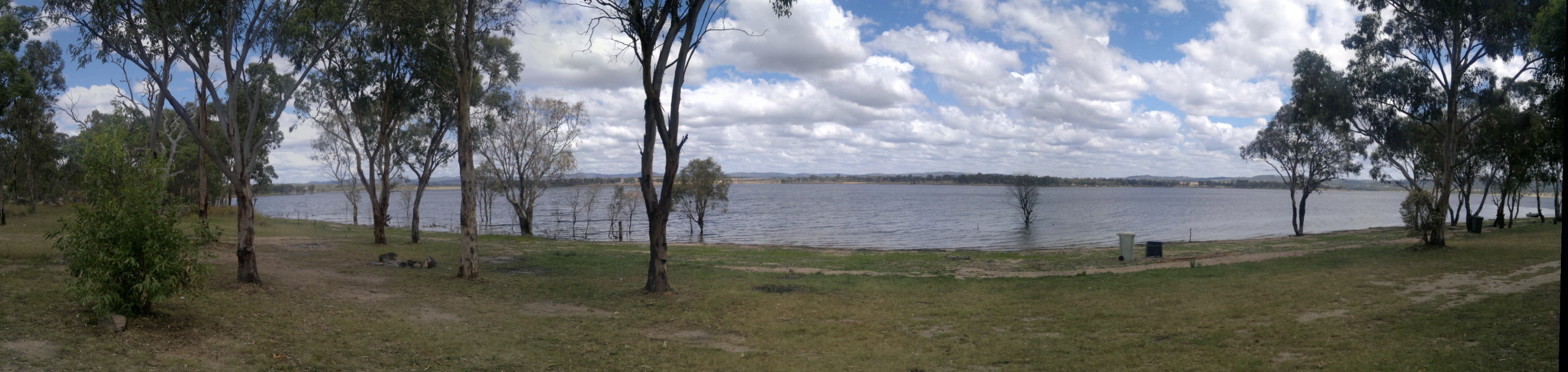
- Lake Glenlyon, 2012

- Interactive map of Glenlyon
- Coordinates: 28.9194°S 151.4522°E
- Country: Australia
- State: Queensland
- LGA: Southern Downs Region
- Location: 60.7 km (37.7 mi) SE of Texas; 90.8 km (56.4 mi) SW of Stanthorpe; 150 km (93 mi) SSW of Warwick; 308 km (191 mi) SW of Brisbane

Government
  - State electorate: Southern Downs
  - Federal division: Maranoa

Area
  - Total: 356.7 km^{2} (137.7 sq mi)

Population
  - Total: 32 (2021 census)
  - Density: 0.0897/km^{2} (0.232/sq mi)
- Time zone: UTC+10:00 (AEST)
- Postcode: 4380
Suburbs around Glenlyon
Warroo	Pikes Creek	Springdale
Silver Spur	Glenlyon	Mingoola
Bonshaw	Maidenhead	Riverton

Glenlyon is a rural locality in the Southern Downs Region, Queensland, Australia. In the 2021 census, Glenlyon had a population of 32 people.

== Geography ==
Lake Glenlyon is a long thin north–south lake in the middle of the locality (28.9363°S 151.4558°E). It was created by impounding Pike Creek with the Glenlyon Dam (28.9786°S 151.4658°E). It is also known as the Pike Creek Reservoir.

The Stanthorpe – Texas Road runs through the locality from north (Pikes Creek) to west (Silver Spur).

There are two small sections of the Claremont State Forest in the south-west of the locality. Apart from these protected areas, the predominant land use is grazing on native vegetation.

== History ==
1883 map of the Darling Downs showing pastoral runs

The locality's name is derived from Glenlyon pastoral run taken up in 1844 by Alexander McLeod. The run can be seen on an 1883 Darling Downs Run Map on Pikes Creek, south of Pikes Creek run.

Glenlyon Provisional School opened on 1 May 1899 and closed in 1909. On 21 August 1933, Glenlyon State School opened. It closed in 1942, but reopened in 1951. It closed permanently in 1978.

In 1996 Scott McLeod Walker, a great-grandson of Alexander McLeod, privately wrote and published a book entitled Glenlyon Connections. The book contains a history of the pastoral run and of some of the families who owned it.

== Demographics ==
In the 2016 census, Glenlyon had a population of 24 people.

In the 2021 census, Glenlyon had a population of 32 people.

== Education ==
There are no schools in Glenlyon. The nearest government school is Texas State School in Texas to the west which provides primary schooling and secondary schooling to Year 10. There is no secondary schooling to Year 12 available nearby; the options are distance education and boarding school.

== Attractions ==
Glenlyon Dam is a tourist attraction. There is a lookout on Pinnacle Road (28.9811°S 151.4627°E).

Boating is permitted in Lake Glenlyon. There is a boat ramp at Glenlyon Dam Road (28.9618°S 151.4692°E) providing access to Lake Glenlyon. It is managed by the Border Rivers Commission.

Fishing is permitted with a Stocked Impoundment Permit, but only from boats, not from the shore. Stocked species include Murray cod, golden perch, and silver perch.
