= Springdale, Queensland =

Springdale
- Suburb
- Interactive map of Springdale
- Coordinates: 28.8008°S 151.6119°E
- Country: Australia
- State: Queensland
- LGA: Southern Downs Region
- Location: 54.4 km (33.8 mi) E of Texas; 50.6 km (31.4 mi) WSW of Stanthorpe; 112 km (70 mi) SW of Warwick; 269 km (167 mi) SW of Brisbane

Government
  - State electorate: Southern Downs
  - Federal division: Maranoa

Area
  - Total: 173.3 km^{2} (66.9 sq mi)

Population
  - Total: 28 (2021 census)
  - Density: 0.1616/km^{2} (0.418/sq mi)
- Time zone: UTC+10:00 (AEST)
- Postcode: 4380
Suburbs around Springdale
Pikes Creek	Pikedale	Nundubbermere
Pikes Creek	Springdale	Sundown
Glenlyon	Mingoola	Sundown

Springdale is a rural locality in the Southern Downs Region, Queensland, Australia. In the 2021 census, Springdale had a population of 28 people.

== Geography ==
The terrain varies from 440 to 980 metres (1,440 to 3,220 ft) above sea level with the following named peaks (from north to south):

- Mount Malakoff (28.7775°S 151.6807°E) 792 metres (2,598 ft)
- Mount Emily (28.7936°S 151.6437°E) 942 metres (3,091 ft)
- Black Jack Mountain (28.8224°S 151.5327°E) 551 metres (1,808 ft)

Apart from the area around the historic arsenic mines, the land use is predominantly grazing on native vegetation.

== History ==
The Queensland Government operated the State Arsenic Mine (also called the Jibbinbar Mine) (28.7812°S 151.6153°E) from 1919 to 1924. The motivation for establishing the mine was to obtain arsenic was to poison prickly pear which was a highly invasive plant species in Queensland at that time. However, the prickly pear was eventually biologically controlled by the introduction of the Cactoblastis cactorum moth, removing the need for large supplies of arsenic, so the mine closed.

Jibbenbah State School opened on 22 June 1922 for the use of mining families and local farming families. It closed on 27 January 1925. It was located at 28.7753°S 151.6100°E about 600 metres (2,000 ft) north-west of the entrance to the mine entrance on Arsenic Mine Road.

== Demographics ==
In the 2016 census, Springdale had a population of 25 people.

In the 2021 census, Springdale had a population of 28 people.

== Education ==
There are no schools in Springdale. The nearest government primary schools are Greenlands State School in Greenlands to the north-east and Texas State School in Texas to the west. The nearest government secondary schools are Texas State School (to Year 10) and Stanthorpe State High School (to Year 12) in Stanthorpe to the north-east.
