= Bonshaw, Queensland =

Bonshaw
- Suburb
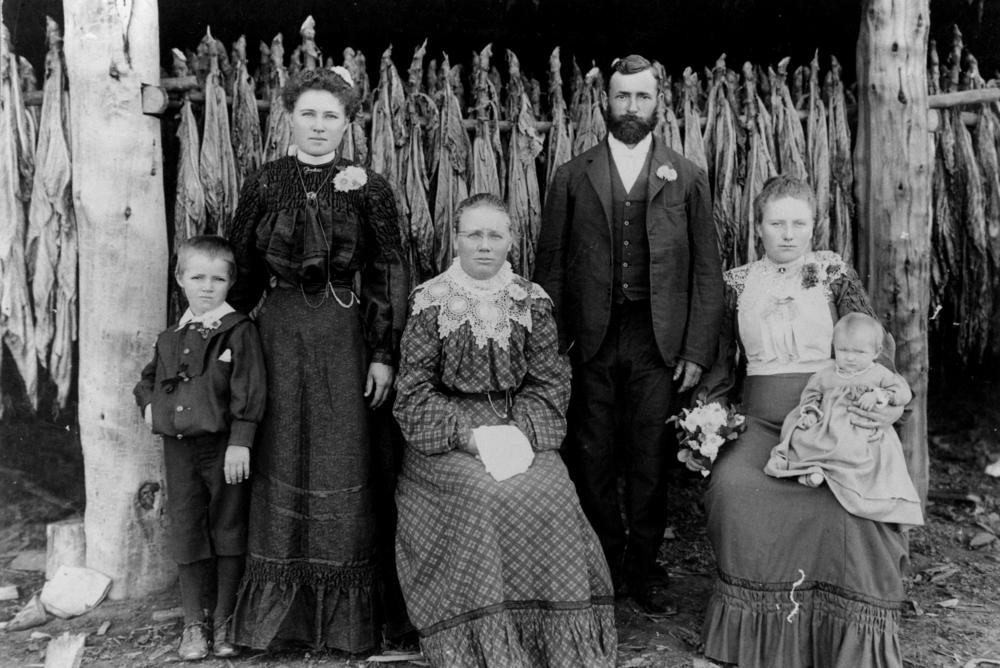
- Tobacco curing in the Bonshaw district, Queensland, circa 1903

- Interactive map of Bonshaw
- Coordinates: 29.0061°S 151.3275°E
- Country: Australia
- State: Queensland
- LGA: Goondiwindi Region
- Location: 20.3 km (12.6 mi) SE of Texas; 139 km (86 mi) SE of Goondiwindi; 166 km (103 mi) SW of Warwick; 323 km (201 mi) SW of Brisbane

Government
  - State electorate: Southern Downs
  - Federal division: Maranoa

Area
  - Total: 121.9 km^{2} (47.1 sq mi)

Population
  - Total: 25 (2021 census)
  - Density: 0.205/km^{2} (0.531/sq mi)
- Time zone: UTC+10:00 (AEST)
- Postcode: 4385
Suburbs around Bonshaw
Silver Spur	Silver Spur	Glenlyon
Bonshaw (NSW)	Bonshaw	Glenlyon
Bonshaw (NSW)	Watsons Crossing	Maidenhead

Bonshaw is a rural locality in the Goondiwindi Region, Queensland, Australia. It is on the border of Queensland and New South Wales. In the 2021 census, Bonshaw had a population of 25 people.

== Geography ==
The Dumaresq River (sometimes called the Severn River) forms the western boundary of the locality and also the state border with New South Wales. The Bonshaw Weir is across the river (28.98605°S 151.27648°E).

The land use is predominantly grazing on native vegetation with crop growing along the Dumaresq River.

== History ==
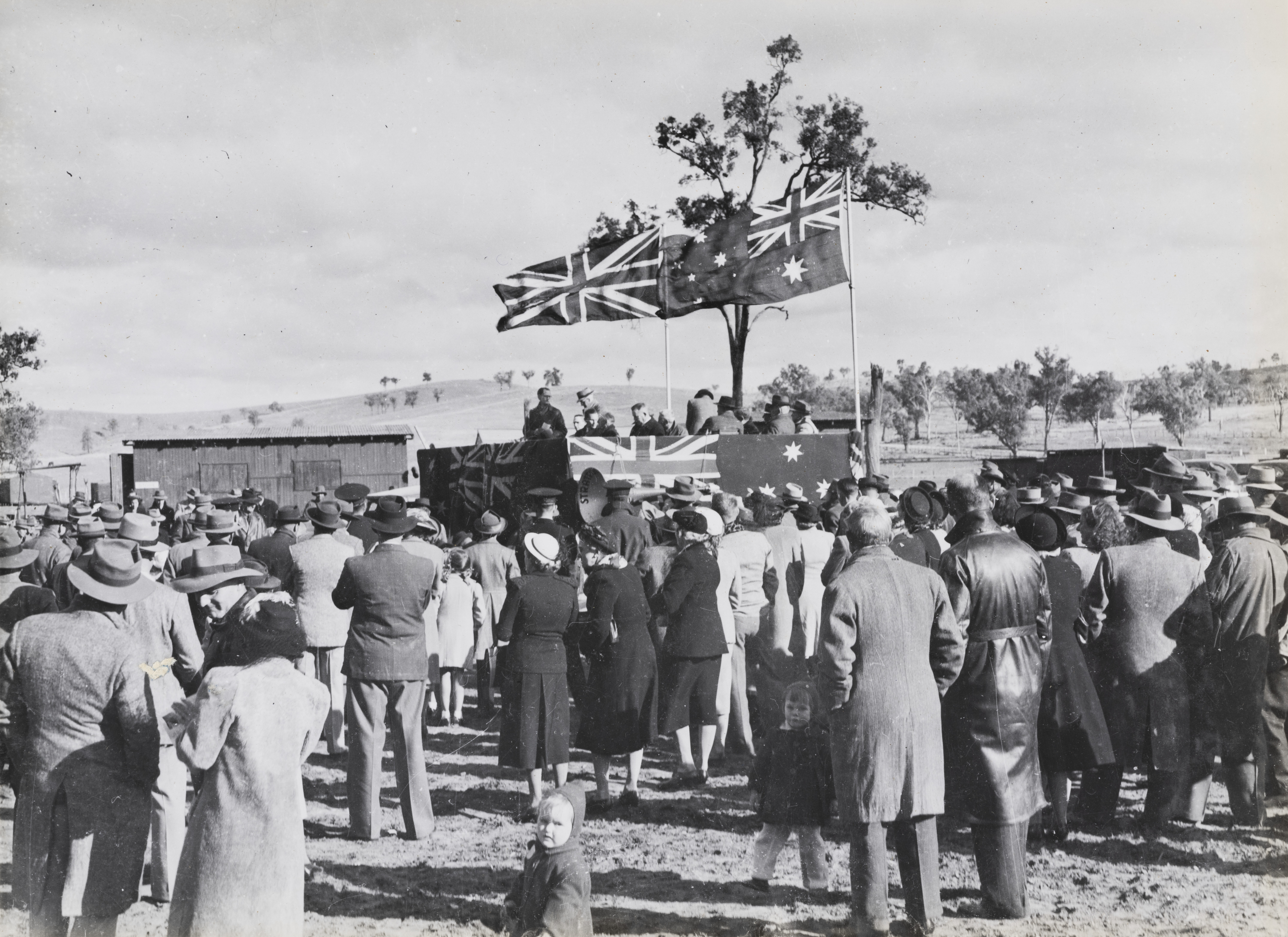
Commencement ceremony for construction of the Bonshaw Weird, 22 June 1949

The locality takes its name from an early pastoral run visible on an 1883 map, but appears in newspaper mentions as early as 1845.

Land in Bonshaw was open for selection on 17 April 1877; 20 square miles (52 km^{2}) were available.

Construction commenced on the Bonshaw Weir on 22 June 1949, but construction was far slower than expected and the costs increased significantly over original estimates. It was completed in May 1953.

== Demographics ==
In the 2016 census, Bonshaw had a population of 40 people.

In the 2021 census, Bonshaw had a population of 25 people.

== Education ==
There are no schools in Bonshaw. The nearest government primary and secondary school is Texas State School (Early Childhood to Year 10) in Texas to the north-west. There are no schools offering education to Year 12 nearby; the alternatives are distance education and boarding school.
