= Whetstone, Queensland =

Whetstone
- Suburb
- Interactive map of Whetstone
- Coordinates: 28.4211°S 150.8486°E
- Country: Australia
- State: Queensland
- LGA: Goondiwindi Region
- Location: 21.2 km (13.2 mi) WSW of Inglewood; 84.4 km (52.4 mi) W of Goondiwindi; 130 km (81 mi) WSW of Warwick; 285 km (177 mi) WSW of Brisbane
- Established: 1877

Government
  - State electorate: Southern Downs
  - Federal division: Maranoa

Area
  - Total: 555.1 km^{2} (214.3 sq mi)

Population
  - Total: 70 (2021 census)
  - Density: 0.126/km^{2} (0.327/sq mi)
- Time zone: UTC+10:00 (AEST)
- Postcode: 4387
Suburbs around Whetstone
Wondalli	Bybera	Bybera
Yelarbon	Whetstone	Inglewood
Yelarbon	Yelarbon	Glenarbon

Whetstone is a rural locality in the Goondiwindi Region, Queensland, Australia. In the 2021 census, Whetstone had a population of 70 people.

== Geography ==
The South Western railway line enters the locality from the east (Inglewood) and exits to south-west (Yelarbon) with the locality served by Whetstone railway station (28.4967°S 150.9322°E).

The Cunningham Highway also enters the locality from the east (Inglewood) and exits to the south-west (Yelarbon).

== History ==
Whetstone was opened for selection on 17 April 1877; 59 square miles (150 km^{2}) were available.

Whetstone Provisional School opened on 19 July 1904 and became Whetstone State School on 1 January 1909. In 1910, it was renamed Inglewood West State School. It suffered from low student numbers and consequently closed and re-opened a number of times, closing finally in 1928. It was on a 2-acre (0.81 ha) site on the northern side of the Cunningham Highway in Inglewood (28.42613°S 151.02393°E).

Whetstone Provisional School opened 9 July 1917. In 1926, it became Whetstone State School. It closed on 4 June 1958. It was on a 2-acre (0.81 ha) site on the eastern side of the Cunningham Highway (28.49834°S 150.93459°E).

== Demographics ==
In the 2016 census, Whetstone had a population of 65 people.

In the 2021 census, Whetstone had a population of 70 people.

== Education ==
There are no schools in Whetstone. The nearest government primary schools are Yelarbon State School in neighbouring Yelarbon to the south-west and Inglewood State School in neighbouring Inglewood to the west. The nearest government secondary school is Inglewood State School (to Year 10). There are no nearby schools offering education to Year 12. The alternatives are distance education and boarding school.
