= Yelarbon =

- Town
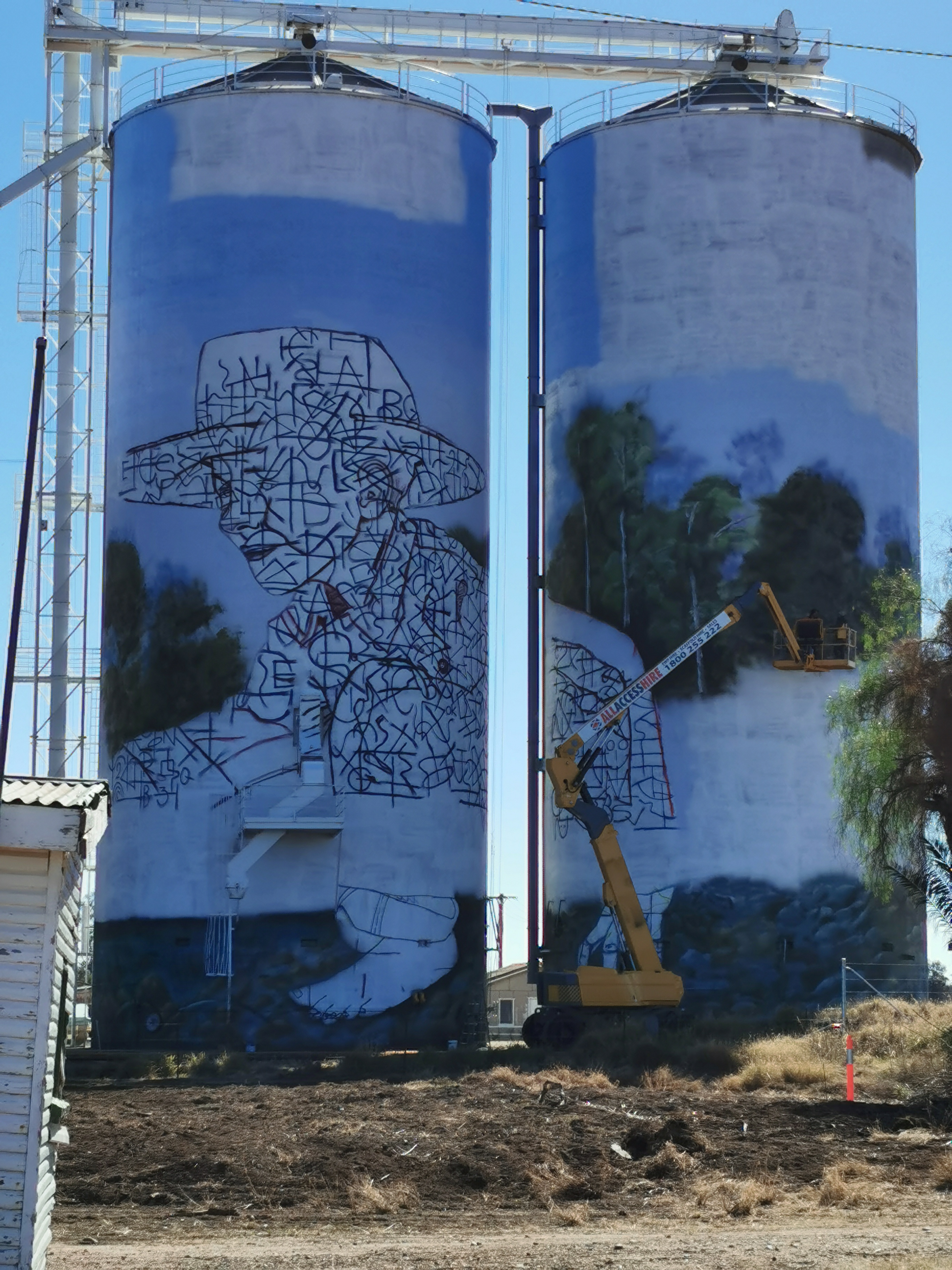
- Painting the silos, 2019

- Interactive map of Yelarbon
- Coordinates: 28.5741°S 150.7541°E
- Country: Australia
- State: Queensland
- LGA: Goondiwindi Region
- Location: 51 km (32 mi) E of Goondiwindi; 191 km (119 mi) SW of Toowoomba; 323 km (201 mi) WSW of Brisbane

Government
  - State electorate: Warrego
  - Federal division: Maranoa

Area
  - Total: 506.7 km^{2} (195.6 sq mi)

Population
  - Total: 313 (2021 census)
  - Density: 0.6177/km^{2} (1.5999/sq mi)
- Postcode: 4388
Localities around Yelarbon
Wondalli	Wondalli	Whetstone
Kurumbul	Yelarbon	Whetstone
Twin Rivers (NSW)	Twin Rivers (NSW)	Glenarbon

Yelarbon is a rural town and locality in the Goondiwindi Region, Queensland, Australia. It is on the border of Queensland and New South Wales. In the 2021 census, the locality of Yelarbon had a population of 313 people.

== Geography ==
Yelarbon is in south-central Queensland on the Dumaresq River, near the New South Wales border. It sits on the Cunningham Highway midway between Goondiwindi and Inglewood.

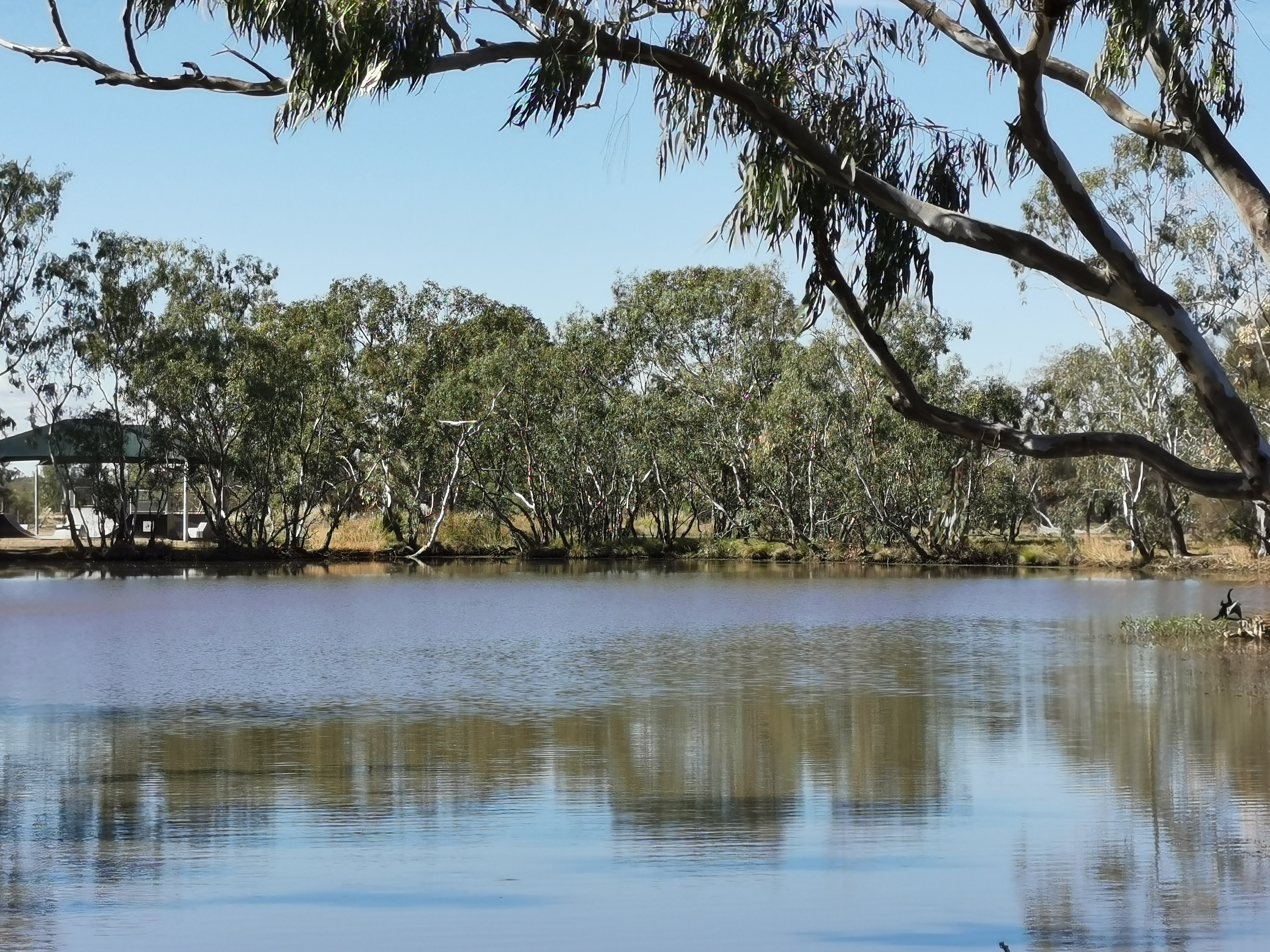
Lagoon, Yelarbon, 2019

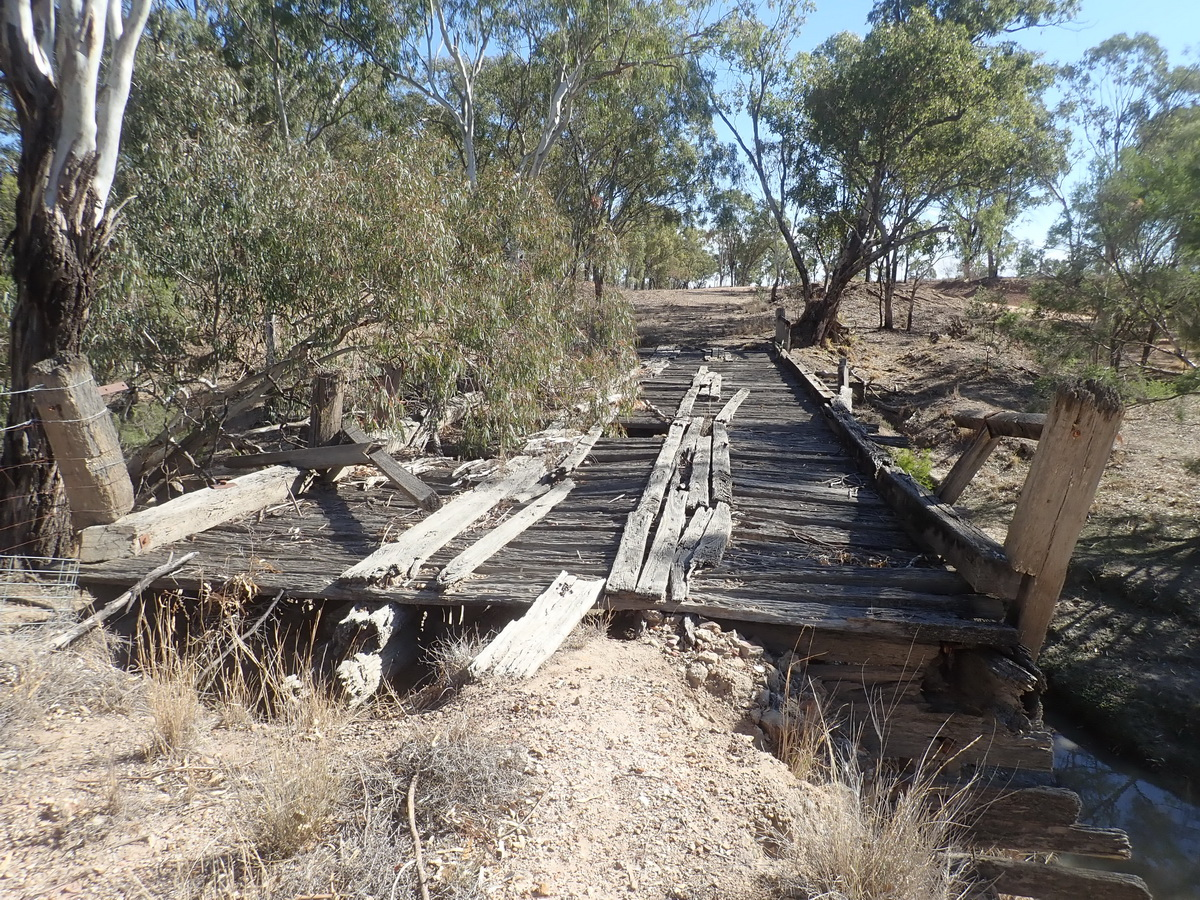
Old bridge, Desert Creek Rd, 2019

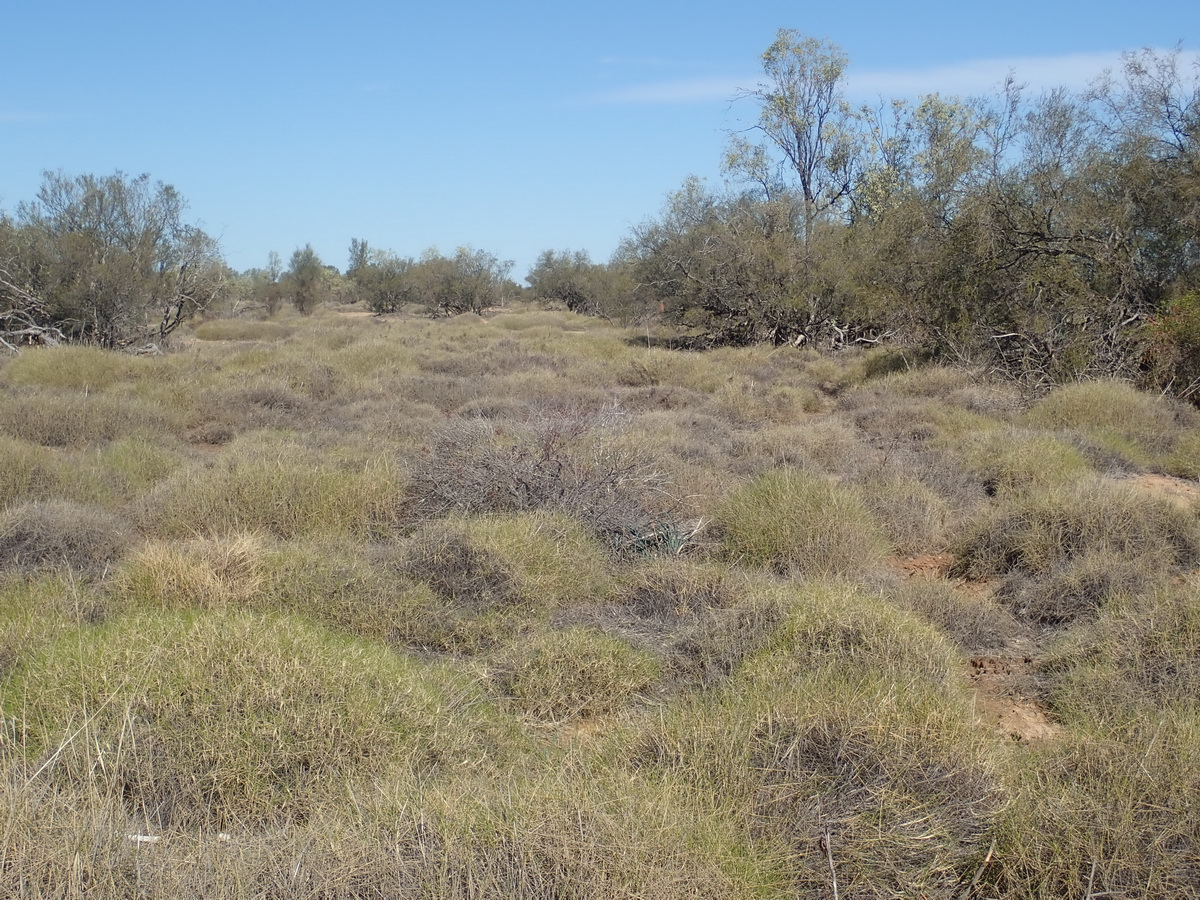
Spinifex Country, Yelarbon, 2019

== History ==
Bigambul (also known as Bigambal, Bigumbil, Pikambul, Pikumbul) is an Australian Aboriginal language spoken by the Bigambul people. The Bigambul language region includes the landscape within the local government boundaries of the Goondiwindi Regional Council, including the towns of Goondiwindi, Yelarbon and Texas extending north towards Moonie and Millmerran.

Yelarbon is an Aboriginal Australian word meaning "Native name for the large lagoon adjacent to the Station."

It was the first place in Queensland to grow tobacco commercially.

== Demographics ==
In the 2006 census, the locality of Yelarbon had a population of 448 people.

In the 2016 census, the locality of Yelarbon had a population of 364 people.

In the 2021 census, the locality of Yelarbon had a population of 313 people.

== Economy ==
Nowadays, cattle and sheep are raised, and cereal crops are grown. A major employer in Yelarbon is the A. E. Girle and Sons sawmill.

== Transport ==
The town is located on a branch of the narrow gauge South Western railway line.

== Education ==
Yelarbon State School is a government primary (Prep–6) school for boys and girls at 17 Eena Street (28.5743°S 150.7536°E). In 2018, the school had an enrolment of 41 students with 6 teachers (3 full-time equivalent) and 6 non-teaching staff (4 full-time equivalent).

There are no secondary schools in Yelarbon. The nearest government secondary schools are Goondiwindi State High School in Goondiwindi (to Year 12) and Inglewood State School in Inglewood (to Year 10 only).

== Recreation ==
There is fishing on the Dumaresq River as well, nearly all recreational. The Murray cod is one of the more sought-after prizes to catch.

There is some feral pig hunting as well in the region.
