= Kurumbul, Queensland =

Kurumbul
- Town
- Interactive map of Kurumbul
- Coordinates: 28.615°S 150.5544°E
- Country: Australia
- State: Queensland
- LGA: Goondiwindi Region
- Location: 33.7 km (20.9 mi) ESE of Goondiwindi; 169 km (105 mi) WSW of Warwick; 209 km (130 mi) SW of Toowoomba; 327 km (203 mi) SW of Brisbane

Government
  - State electorate: Southern Downs
  - Federal division: Maranoa

Area
  - Total: 258.9 km^{2} (100.0 sq mi)

Population
  - Total: 36 (2021 census)
  - Density: 0.1390/km^{2} (0.360/sq mi)
- Time zone: UTC+10:00 (AEST)
- Postcode: 4388
Localities around Kurumbul
Goondiwindi	Wondalli	Wondalli
Goondiwindi	Kurumbul	Yelarbon
Boggabilla (NSW)	Twin Rivers (NSW)	Yelarbon

Kurumbul is a rural town and locality in the Goondiwindi Region, Queensland, Australia. It is on the border of Queensland and New South Wales. In the 2021 census, the locality of Kurumbul had a population of 36 people.

== Geography ==
The Dumaresq River forms most of the southern boundary and is the border between Queensland and New South Wales.

The Cunningham Highway runs along the northern boundary.

The South Western railway line enters the locality from the south-east (Yelarbon), passes immediately south of the town (located in the south-east of the locality), and exits to the west (Goondiwindi). The locality is served by three railway stations, from west to east:

- Carrington railway station (28.5933°S 150.4183°E)
- Kildonan railway station, now abandoned (28.6085°S 150.4527°E)
- Kurumbul railway station, serving the town (28.6155°S 150.5563°E)

== History ==
The town takes its name from its railway station, which was originally named Burranba (an Aboriginal word meaning brigalow) on 3 September 1908, but was changed to Kurumbul (believed to be an Aboriginal word meaning magpie) on 30 August 1912.

Burranba State School opened in March 1912. Circa 1924, it had become Kurumbul State School. It closed in 1976. It was at 1954 Yelarbon Kurumbul Road (28.6143°S 150.5573°E). In 1977–1978, the Kurumbul school building was relocated to Daymar State School in Daymar.

== Demographics ==
In the 2016 census, Kurumbul had a population of 46 people.

In the 2021 census, the locality of Kurumbul had a population of 36 people.

== Education ==
There are no schools in Kurumbul. The nearest government primary schools are Yelarbon State School in neighbouring Yelarbon to the east and Goondiwindi State School in neighbouring Goondiwindi to the west. The nearest government secondary school is Goondiwindi State High School in Goondiwindi to the west.
