= Wondalli, Queensland =

Wondalli
- Suburb
- Interactive map of Wondalli
- Coordinates: 28.3808°S 150.6086°E
- Country: Australia
- State: Queensland
- LGA: Goondiwindi Region
- Location: 59.3 km (36.8 mi) NE of Goondiwindi; 60 km (37 mi) NW of Inglewood; 169 km (105 mi) W of Warwick; 179 km (111 mi) WSW of Toowoomba; 313 km (194 mi) WSW of Brisbane

Government
  - State electorate: Southern Downs
  - Federal division: Maranoa

Area
  - Total: 476.7 km^{2} (184.1 sq mi)

Population
  - Total: 46 (2021 census)
  - Density: 0.0965/km^{2} (0.2499/sq mi)
- Time zone: UTC+10:00 (AEST)
- Postcode: 4390
Suburbs around Wondalli
| Wyaga | Wyaga | Bybera |
| Goondiwindi | Wondalli | Whetstone |
| Goondiwindi | Kurumbul | Yelarbon |

Wondalli is a rural locality in the Goondiwindi Region, Queensland, Australia. In the 2021 census, Wondalli had a population of 46 people.

== Geography ==
The Cunningham Highway forms the southern boundary of the locality, entering from the south-east (Yelarbon) and exiting to the south-west (Goondiwindi).

There are a number of protected areas in the locality:

- Bendidee National Park in the north-west of the locality
- Bendidee State Forest in the north-west of the locality
- Kerimbilla State Forest 1 in the centre of the locality
- Kerimbilla State Forest 2 in the south-east of the locality

Apart from the protected areas, the land use is grazing on native vegetation with some crop growing.

== History ==
Wondalli Creek Provisional School (also called Wondalli Provisional School) opened in 1912 and closed in 1916. It was on a 2-acre (0.81 ha) site on the western side of Woodcocks Road in neighbouring Yelarbon (approx 28.52409°S 150.70495°E).

== Demographics ==
In the 2016 census, Wondalli had a population of 65 people.

In the 2021 census, Wondalli had a population of 46 people.

== Education ==
There are no schools in Wondalli. The nearest government primary schools are Yelarbon State School in neighbouring Yelarbon to the south-west, Kindon State School in Kindon to the north, and Goondiwindi State School in neighbouring Goondiwindi to the south-west. The nearest government secondary schools are Goondiwindi State High School (to Year 12) in Goondiwindi to the south-west and Inglewood State School (to Year 10) in Inglewood to the east. However, students from some parts of Wondalli may to be too distant to attend these secondary schools; the alternatives are distance education and boarding school.
