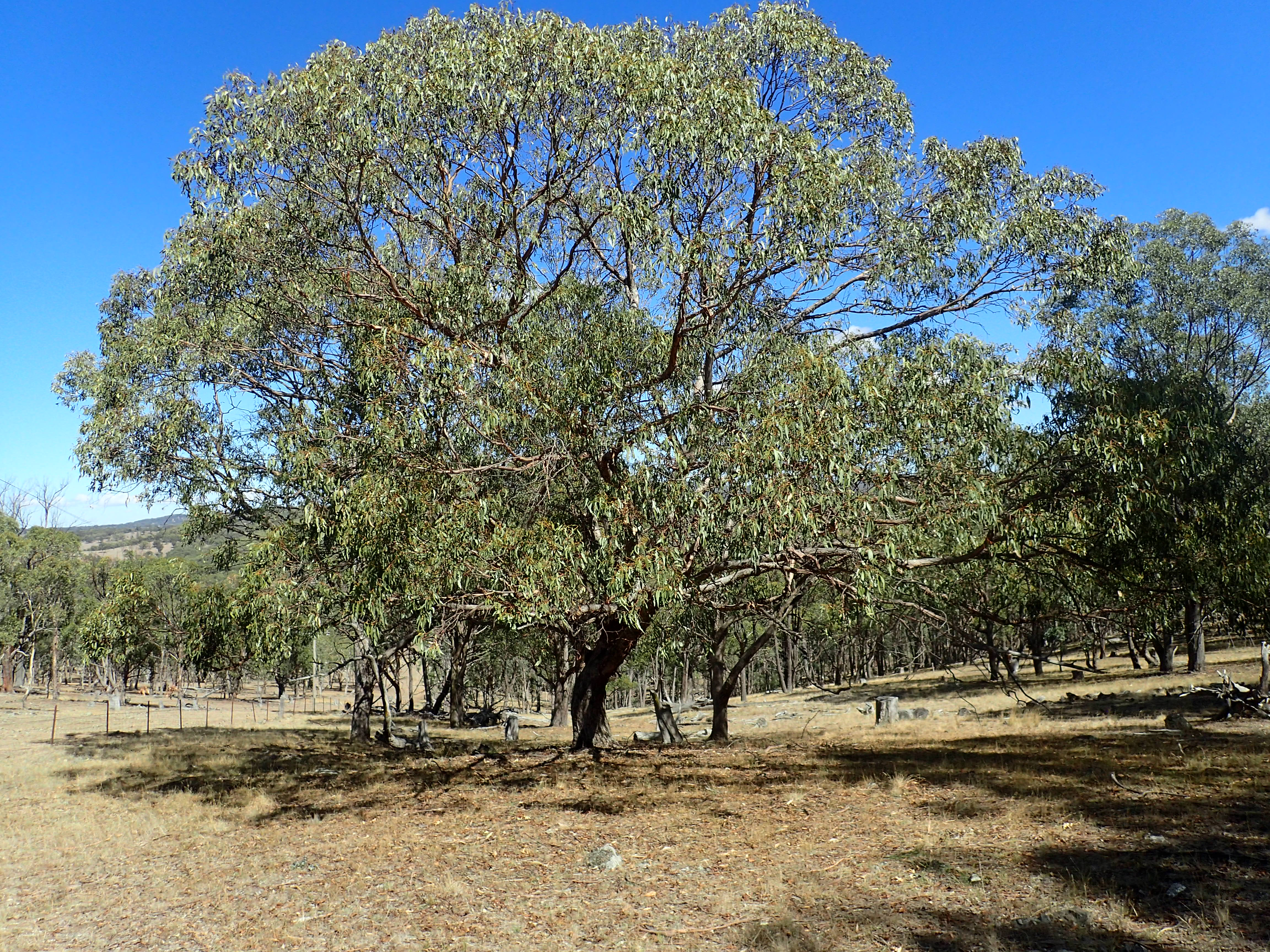
- Eucalyptus banksii growing near Armidale

Conservation status
- Near Threatened (IUCN 3.1)

Scientific classification
- Kingdom: Plantae
- Clade: Tracheophytes
- Clade: Angiosperms
- Clade: Eudicots
- Clade: Rosids
- Order: Myrtales
- Family: Myrtaceae
- Genus: Eucalyptus
- Species: E. banksii

Binomial name
- Eucalyptus banksii Maiden

= Eucalyptus banksii =

Tenterfield woollybutt

Species of eucalyptus

Eucalyptus banksii, commonly known as the Tenterfield woollybutt, is a tree that is endemic to eastern Australia. It has rough fibrous or flaky bark, lance-shaped to curved leaves, flower buds without a pedicel in groups of seven in leaf axils, white flowers and hemispherical to cup-shaped or conical fruit.

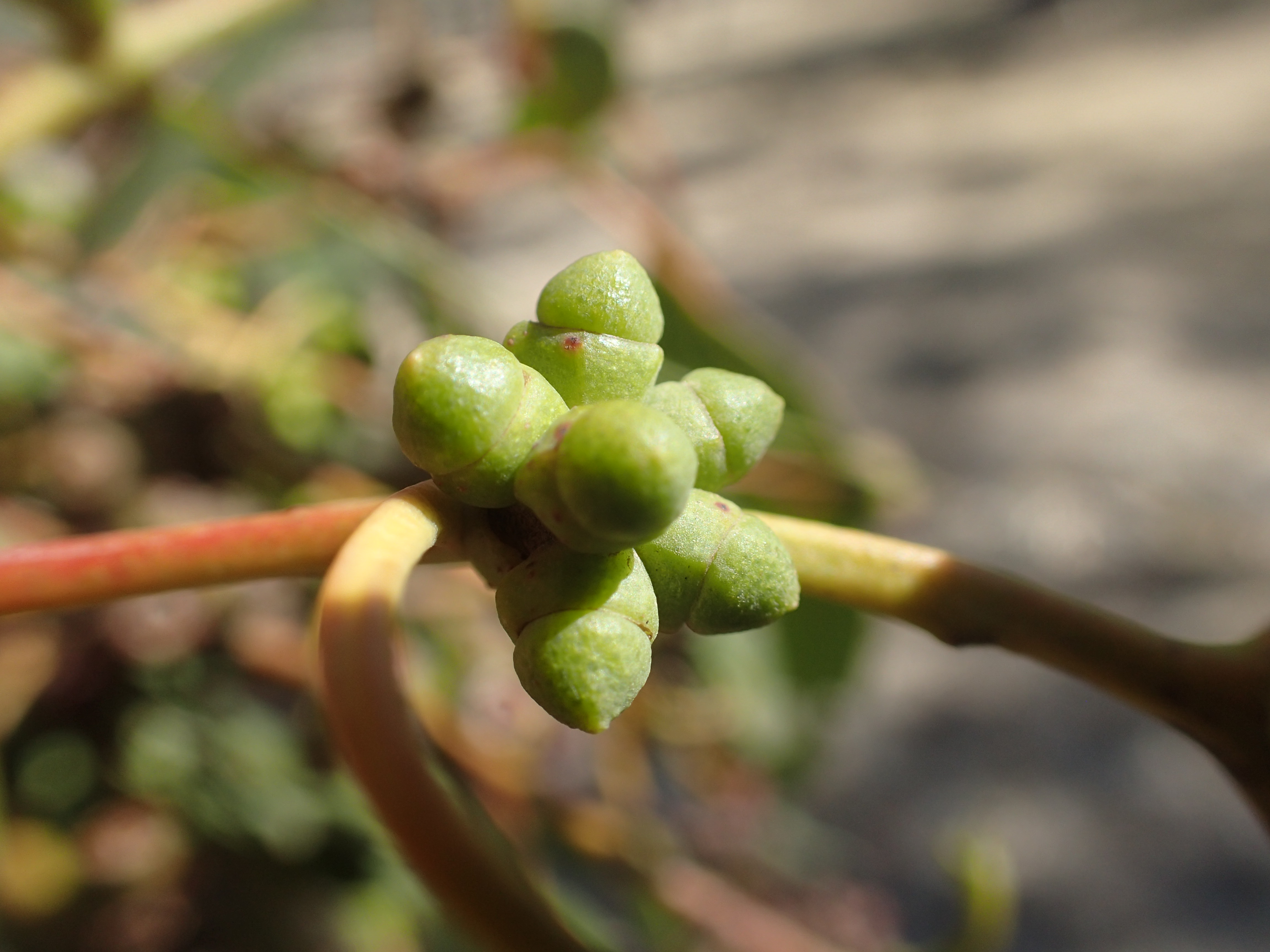
buds

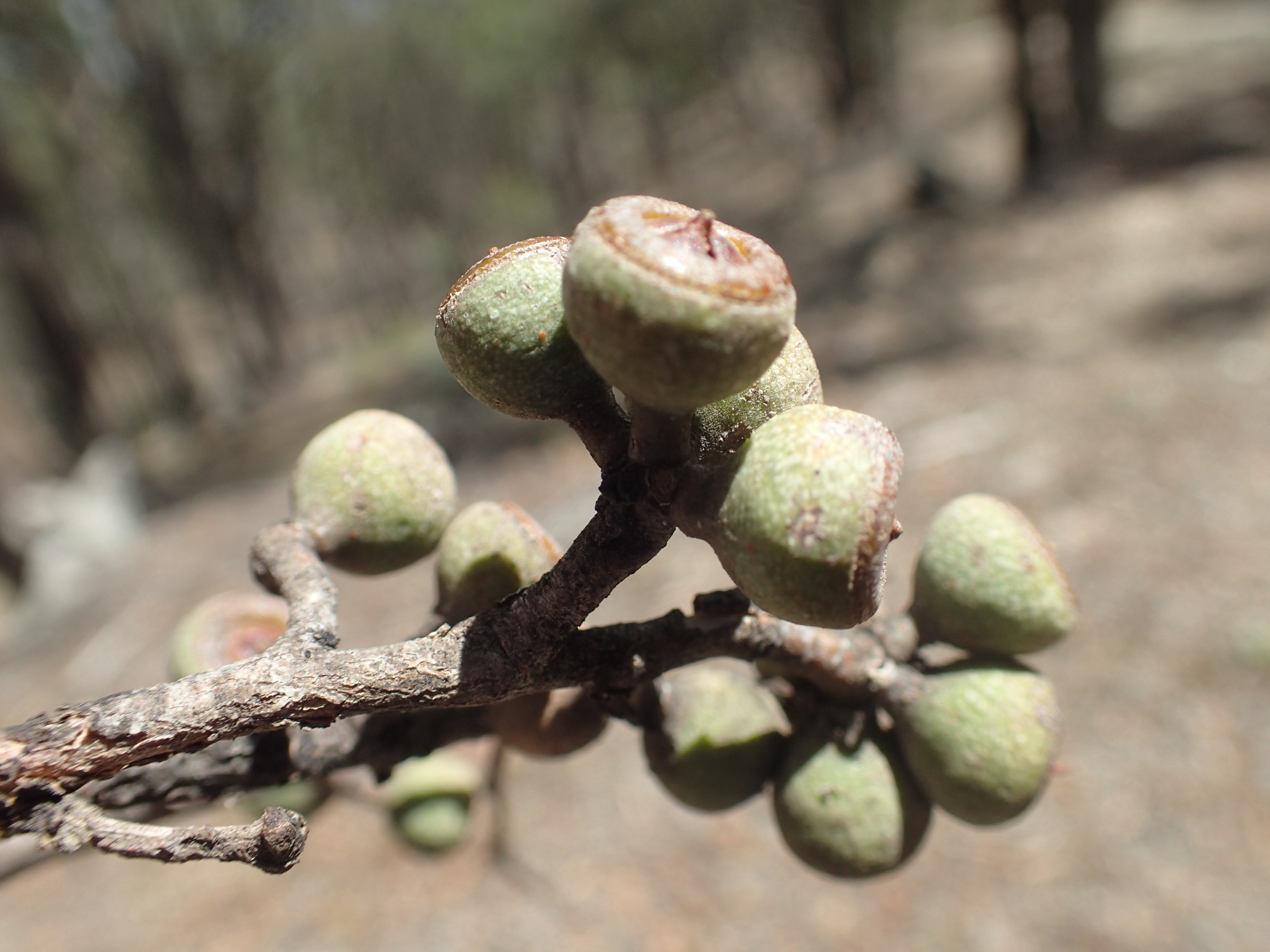
fruit

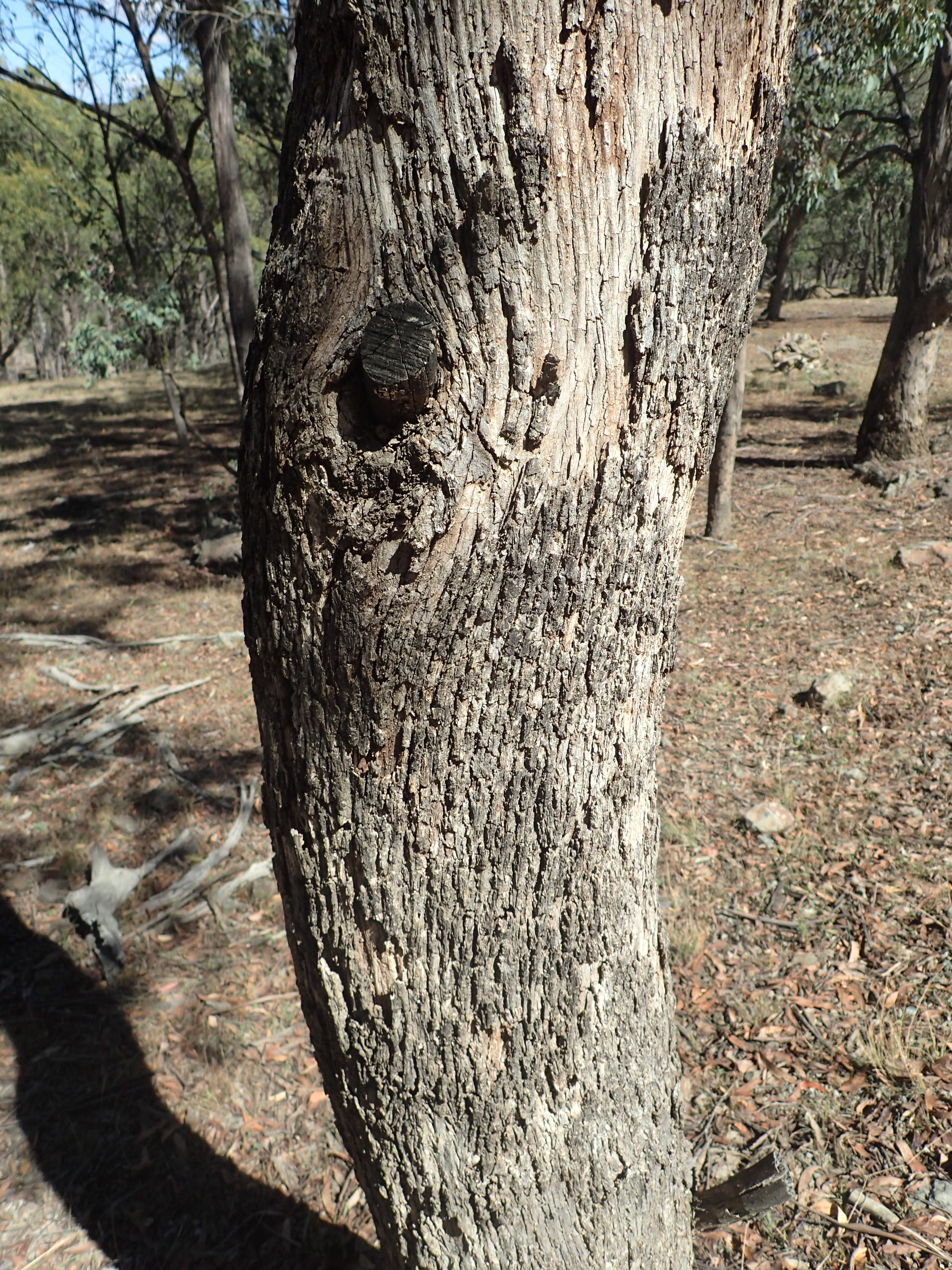
bark

== Description ==
Eucalyptus banksii is a tree that grows to a height of 20–30 metres (66–98 ft) high but is sometimes stunted and mallee-like. The bark on the trunk and larger branches is greyish, fibrous or flaky but smooth and yellow on the branches. The leaves on young plants and coppice regrowth are arranged in opposite pairs, egg-shaped, heart-shaped or more or less round, 35–85 mm (1.4–3.3 in) long and 30–65 mm (1.2–2.6 in) wide. Adult leaves are lance-shaped to curved, the same glossy green on both sides, 100–190 mm (3.9–7.5 in) long and 15–30 mm (0.6–1 in) wide with a petiole 18–40 mm (0.7–2 in) long. The flower buds are usually arranged in groups of seven in leaf axils on a thick peduncle up to 5 mm (0.2 in) long but the individual flowers are sessile. Mature buds are oblong or oval to more or less spherical, 4–7 mm (0.16–0.28 in) long and 4–5 mm (0.16–0.20 in) wide with a conical or rounded operculum. Flowering occurs in autumn and the flowers are white. The fruit are sessile, hemispherical to cup-shaped or conical, 3–6 mm (0.1–0.2 in) long and 6–11 mm (0.2–0.4 in) wide with the valves protruding.

== Taxonomy and naming ==
Eucalyptus banksii was first formally described in 1905 by Joseph Maiden from a specimen collected by John Luke Boorman "on the sides of hills at an elevation of about 3,500 feet in the Wallangarra district". The description was published in Proceedings of the Linnean Society of New South Wales and the specific epithet (banksii) honours Joseph Banks.

== Distribution and habitat ==
Tenterfield woollybutt grows mostly in granitic soils on hillslopes and occurs between Cunninghams Gap and the McPherson Range in Queensland south to Armidale in New South Wales.
