= Mingoola, New South Wales =

Mingoola New South Wales
- Coordinates: 29°00′24″S 151°32′32″E
- Population: 18 (2016 census)
- Postcode(s): 4380
- Location: 714 km (444 mi) NNW of Sydney; 312 km (194 mi) SW of Brisbane; 244 km (152 mi) N of Armidale; 57 km (35 mi) W of Tenterfield
- LGA(s): Tenterfield Shire
- State electorate(s): Lismore
- Federal division(s): New England

Mingoola is a rural locality in the New England region of New South Wales, Australia. The locality is in the Tenterfield Shire local government area, on the Bruxner Highway and Mole River 714 kilometres (444 mi) north west of the state capital, Sydney. At the 2016 census, Mingoola had a population of 18.

In 2016, Mingoola was the site for a pioneering refugee resettlement program. The program involved the resettlement of refugees from Africa to live and work in Mingoola. The program has been seen as an opportunity for refugees and small rural communities alike. However, by 2019, all of the refugees had left Mingoola due to drought making farming and farm jobs unviable, medical conditions that required being closer to specialists, and lack of water again due to the drought.
