= Bonshaw, New South Wales =

Bonshaw
- Town
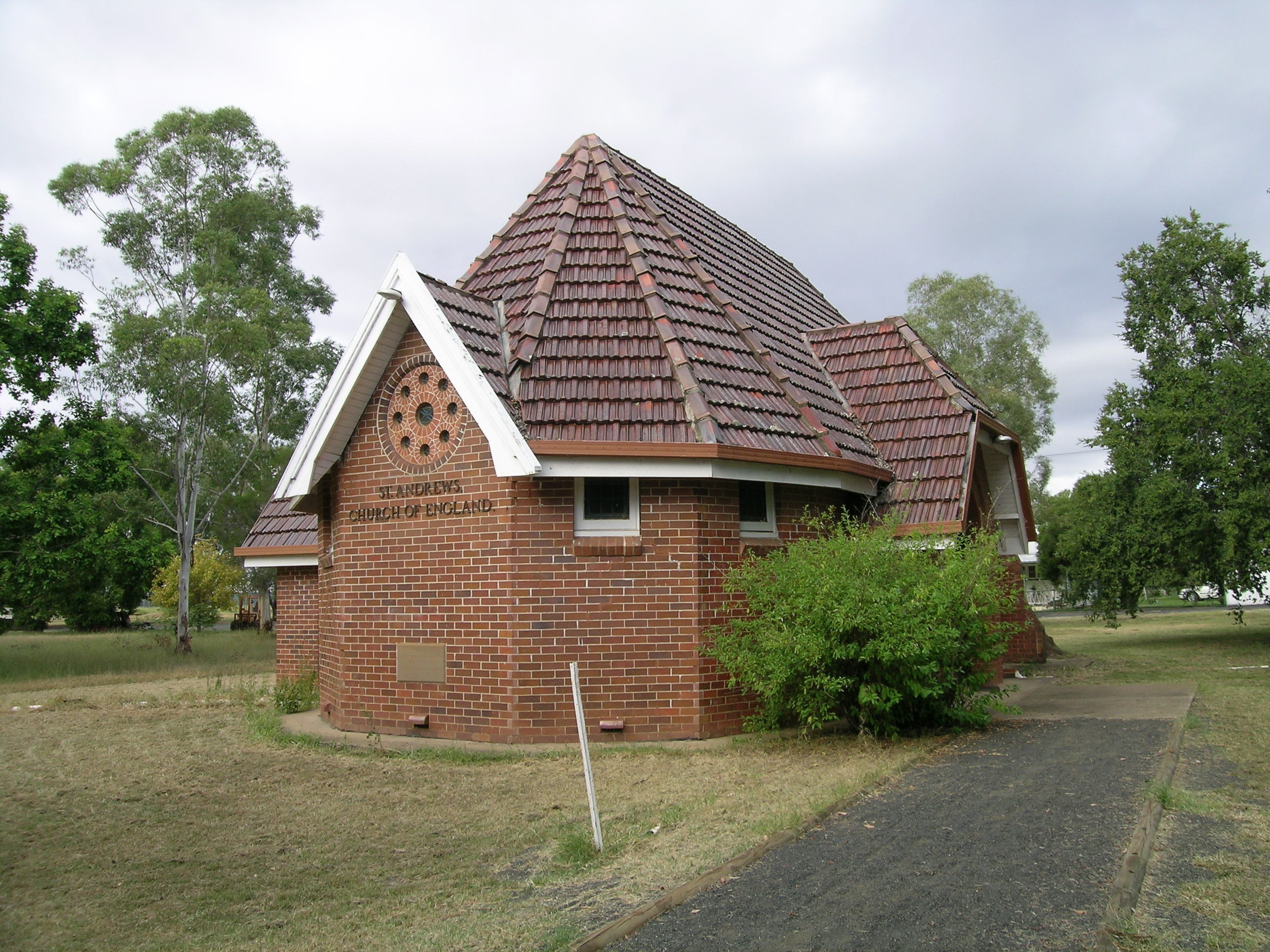
- St Andrews Church of England, Bonshaw

- Coordinates: 29°03′S 151°16′E
- Country: Australia
- State: New South Wales
- LGA: Inverell Shire
- Location: 30 km (19 mi) SE of Texas; 98 km (61 mi) N of Inverell; 104 km (65 mi) W of Tenterfield; 328 km (204 mi) SW of Brisbane; 678 km (421 mi) N of Sydney

Government
  - State electorate: Northern Tablelands
  - Federal division: New England
- Elevation: 306 m (1,004 ft)

Population
  - Total: 133 (2016)
- Postcode: 2361
- County: Arrawatta

Bonshaw is a village in New South Wales, Australia 678 km north of Sydney. In the 2016 census, the village had a population of 133 people in the district. It is located near the northern border of the State close to Texas, Queensland, from which it is separated by the Dumaresq River which forms the border between the states. Bonshaw is located in Inverell Shire and Arrawatta County. It is on the Bruxner Highway between Tenterfield and Goondiwindi. It is a village designed to serve the needs of the agricultural holdings in the area.

Bonshaw Post Office opened on 1 October 1866 and closed around 1994.
