= Macdonald River railway bridge =

Heritage listed railway bridge in New South Wales

Macdonald River railway bridge, Woolbrook
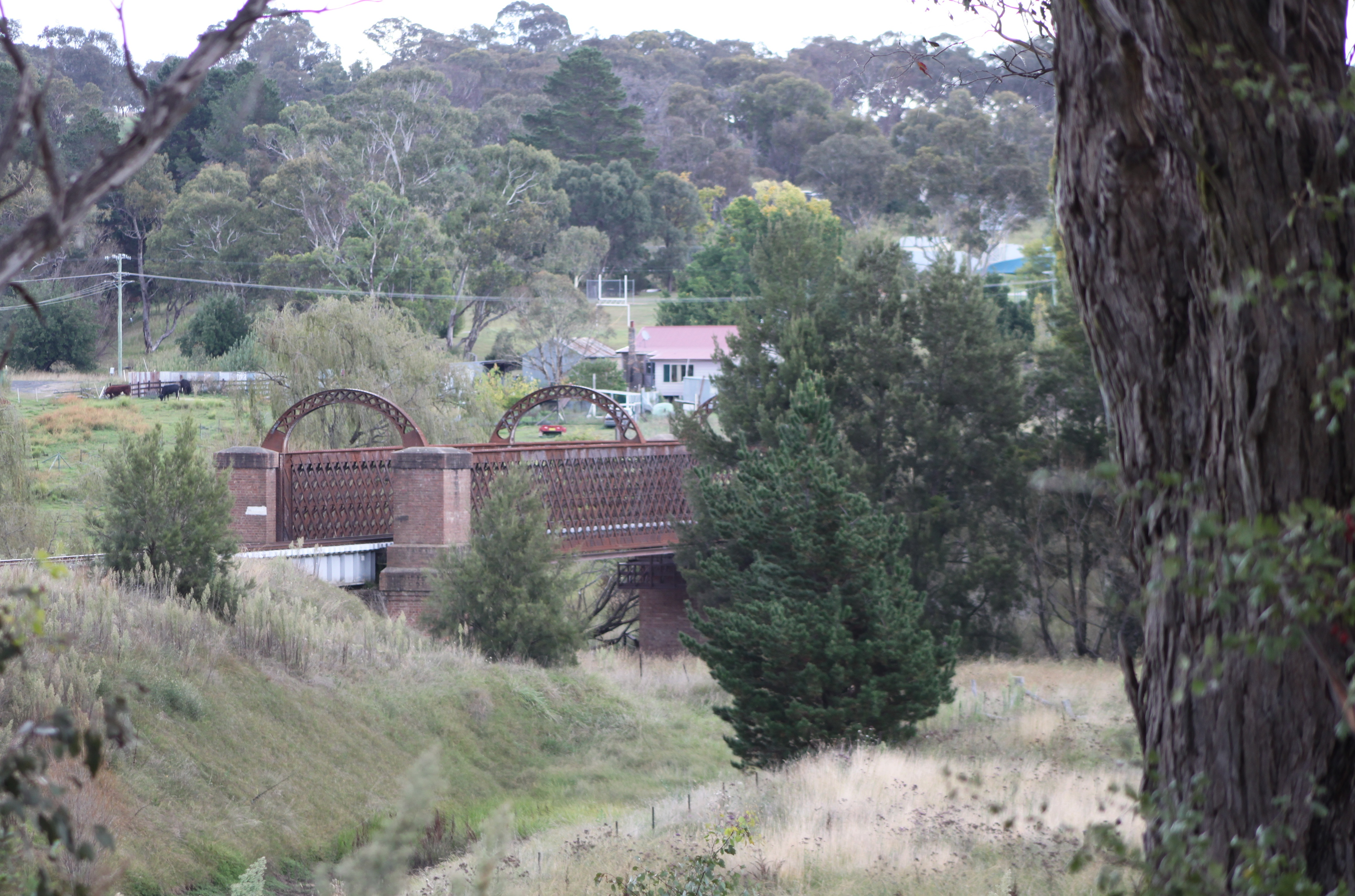
- Macdonald River railway bridge, 2012
- Coordinates: 30°58′04″S 151°20′51″E
- Carries: Main Northern railway
- Crosses: Macdonald River
- Locale: Woolbrook, Walcha Shire, New South Wales, Australia
- Other names: Woolbrook rail bridge over the Macdonald River; Woolbrook Lattice Railway Bridge
- Owner: Transport Asset Manager of New South Wales

Characteristics
- Design: lattice girder bridge
- Material: Wrought iron
- Pier construction: Brick
- Longest span: 48 metres (157 ft)
- No. of spans: 1

Rail characteristics
- No. of tracks: One
- Track gauge: 4 ft 8 1/2 in (1,435 mm) standard gauge

History
- Designer: Sir John Fowler for John Whitton
- Contracted lead designer: New South Wales Government Railways
- Constructed by: J. S. Bennett
- Fabrication by: J. & C. Brettell, Worcester, England (ironwork)
- Construction end: 1882

New South Wales Heritage Register
- Official name: Woolbrook rail bridge over McDonald River; Woolbrook Lattice Railway Bridge
- Type: State heritage (built)
- Designated: 2 April 1999
- Reference no.: 1067
- Type: Railway Bridge/Viaduct
- Category: Transport – Rail
- Builders: J. S. Bennett; J. & C. Brettell, Worcester, England (ironwork)

Location
- Interactive map of Macdonald River railway bridge, Woolbrook

The Macdonald River railway bridge is a heritage-listed railway bridge that carries the Main Northern Line across the Macdonald River located in Woolbrook, in the Walcha Shire, New South Wales, Australia. The railway bridge was designed by John Whitton as the Engineer-in-Chief for the New South Wales Government Railways and built during 1882 by J. S. Bennett, with iron work by J. & C. Brettell, Worcester, England. The railway bridge is also known as the Woolbrook rail bridge over the Macdonald River and the Woolbrook Lattice Railway Bridge. The bridge and adjacent infrastructure is owned by Transport Asset Manager of New South Wales, an agency of the Government of New South Wales. The bridge was added to the New South Wales State Heritage Register on 2 April 1999 and was added to the (now defunct) Register of the National Estate on 18 April 1989.

== History ==
During the 20-year period 1873–1893 there was a massive program of public works in New South Wales, particularly in expanding the road and rail networks. It was a boom period that ended with a severe economic depression.

Despite the boom conditions, the respective Chief Engineers, for Roads (William C. Bennett) and for Railways, John Whitton, were constrained to economise by using as much local material as possible, consequently an enormous amount of hardwood timber was used for bridgeworks, mostly timber beam and timber truss bridges. However, there were many major rivers to be crossed, requiring long span bridges, for which no form of timber bridge was suitable. These large bridges had to be metal and supplied from England, a very expensive import cost to the successive colonial governments.

Both Chief Engineers were British so they chose the widely used wrought iron lattice truss bridge in the half-through form. Twelve of these were built for the railways and 24 for roads. These two sets of iron lattice bridges are the most significant group of bridges of the colonial period. A high percentage are extant and still in use, eleven on railway bridges and eighteen on road bridges.

The current railway lattice bridges are the:

- 1876 – Macquarie River bridge at Bathurst
- 1881 – Macquarie River at Wellington
- 1882 – Peel River bridge at Tamworth
- 1882 – MacDonald River bridge at Woolbrook
- 1884 – Murray River bridge at Albury
- 1884 – Macquarie River bridge at Dubbo
- 1885 – Murrumbidgee River bridge at Narrandera
- 1887 – Lachlan River bridge at Cowra

Two former railway lattice bridges (1885 Georges River at Como and 1886 Parramatta River at Meadowbank) were converted for use by pedestrian/cycle ways. The 1871 lattice railway bridge over the Hunter River at Aberdeen was replaced by steel girders and demolished.

== Description ==
A single-span wrought iron lattice bridge. The span is 48 metres (159 ft) to the centre of bearings and the lattice work has seven triangulations.

The bridge carries a single 4 ft 8 1/2 in (1,435 mm) standard gauge railway, with transomes on timber stringers on metal cross girders, which frame into the sides of the lower chords. The main trusses are through type lattice trusses, simply supported. They are of constant depth with seven triangulations and are connected together above the track by characteristic arched, latticed braces. The abutments are of brick. The super structure was fabricated by J. and C. Brettell, Worcester, England; A. and R. Amos were the principal contractors. The bridge was placed in service on 2 August 1882.

This is the only iron lattice railway bridge with brick abutments.

=== Condition ===
As at 26 April 2006, the bridge's physical condition was good. Apart from relatively minor technical works of repair and strengthening, all the iron lattice railway bridges retain their original fabrics. In 2017 it was reported that the 135-year-old steel bridge has a 30 kilometres per hour (19 mph) speed limit for passenger trains.

== Heritage listing ==
This bridge is one of Whitton's major 1870s wrought iron bridges and is an excellent example of early bridge construction. The lattice girder is one of Whitton's original 12 bridges of that design and they represent the third stage of bridge construction in NSW following the stone viaduct and iron tubular bridges.

This bridge is a member of the most significant group of colonial bridges in New South Wales. Collectively, as items of railway infrastructure, they contributed significantly to the history and development of New South Wales. Each bridge is an imposing structure at its site. In terms of contemporary bridge technology the wrought iron lattice bridge was among the best for major bridgeworks.

Woolbrook rail bridge over McDonald River was listed on the New South Wales State Heritage Register on 2 April 1999 having satisfied the following criteria.

The place is important in demonstrating the course, or pattern, of cultural or natural history in New South Wales.

Twelve wrought iron lattice railway bridges were built in New South Wales during the boom period for railway construction 1871–1887, starting at Aberdeen and ending at Cowra. Nine of the survivors are owned and managed by the Transport Asset Holding Entity.

The place is important in demonstrating aesthetic characteristics and/or a high degree of creative or technical achievement in New South Wales.

All nine iron lattice railway bridges are imposing structures

The place has a strong or special association with a particular community or cultural group in New South Wales for social, cultural or spiritual reasons.

Every iron lattice railway bridge crossed a major river which made it possible for the railway extension to develop the districts reached, socially and commercially.

The place has potential to yield information that will contribute to an understanding of the cultural or natural history of New South Wales.

The iron lattice bridge was a technically sound structure for the bridge technology of the late colonial period. Its strength and durability have shown it to have been a very cost-effective form of bridge.

The place is important in demonstrating the principal characteristics of a class of cultural or natural places/environments in New South Wales.

Collectively, the iron lattice railway bridges represent a significant class of bridge structure.

== See also ==
- List of railway bridges in New South Wales
