= Murrumbidgee River railway bridge, Narrandera =

Historic railway bridge in New South Wales, Australia

Murrumbidgee River railway bridge
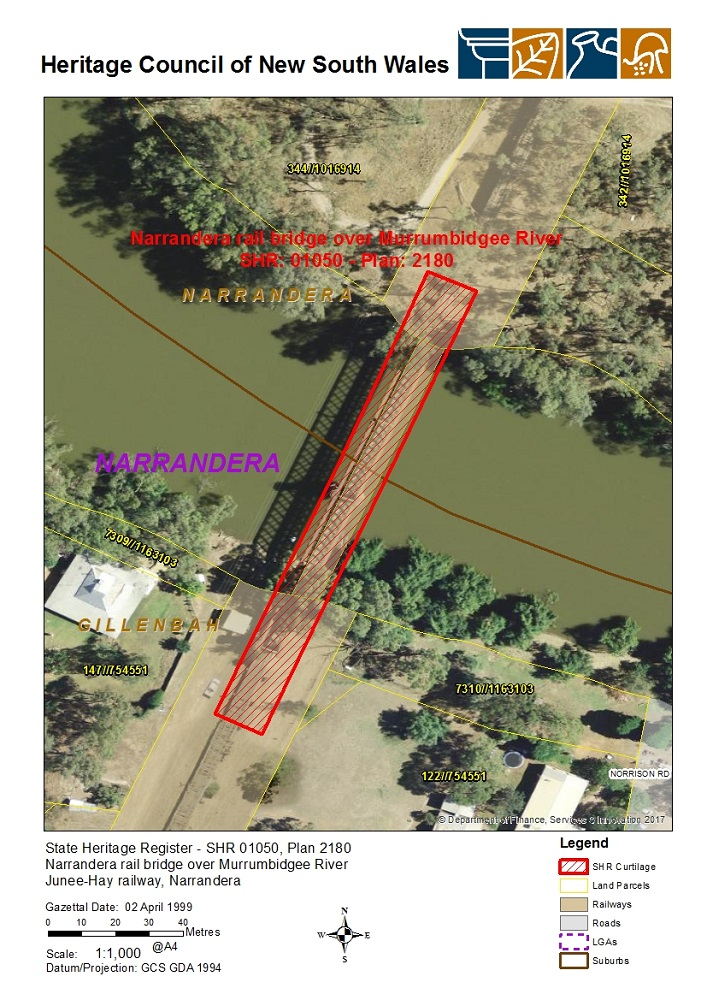
- Heritage boundaries
- Coordinates: 34°45′31″S 146°32′09″E
- Carries: Tocumwal railway line
- Crosses: Murrumbidgee River
- Locale: Narrandera, Narrandera Shire, New South Wales, Australia
- Begins: Narrandera (north)
- Ends: Gillenbah (south)
- Other name: Narrandera Lattice Railway Bridge
- Owner: Transport Asset Manager of New South Wales

Characteristics
- Design: Lattice truss
- Material: Wrought iron
- Pier construction: Cast iron
- Longest span: 48 metres (159 ft)
- No. of spans: 2

Rail characteristics
- No. of tracks: One
- Track gauge: 4 ft 8 1/2 in (1,435 mm) standard gauge

History
- Designer: John Whitton
- Constructed by: Halliday & Owen
- Fabrication by: Westwood, Baillie, England
- Construction start: 1884
- Construction end: 1885

New South Wales Heritage Register
- Official name: Narrandera rail bridge over Murrumbidgee River; Narrandera Lattice Railway Bridge
- Type: State heritage (built)
- Designated: 2 April 1999
- Reference no.: 1050
- Type: Railway Bridge/Viaduct
- Category: Transport – Rail
- Builders: Haliday & Owen; Westwood, Baillie, England (ironwork)

Location
- Interactive map of Murrumbidgee River railway bridge

Murrumbidgee River railway bridge is a heritage-listed disused railway bridge on the Tocumwal railway line crossing from Narrandera to Gillenbah, both in Narrandera Shire, New South Wales, Australia. It was designed by John Whitton in his capacity as Engineer-in-Chief for Railways, and built in 1884–85 by Halliday & Owen with ironwork supplied by English firm Westwood, Baillie. It is also known as Narrandera Lattice Railway Bridge. The property was added to the New South Wales State Heritage Register on 2 April 1999 and was added to the (now defunct) Register of the National Estate on 15 May 1990.

== History ==
=== Iron lattice truss bridges ===
During the 20-year period 1873–1893 there was a massive programme of public works in New South Wales, particularly in expanding the road and rail networks. It was a boom period that ended with a severe economic depression.

Despite the boom conditions, the respective Chief Engineers, for Roads (William C. Bennett) and for Railways (John Whitton) were constrained to economise by using as much local material as possible, consequently an enormous amount of hardwood timber was used for bridgeworks, mostly timber beam and timber truss bridges. However, there were many major rivers to be crossed, requiring long span bridges, for which no form of timber bridge was suitable. These large bridges had to be metal and supplied from England, a very expensive import cost to the successive colonial governments.

Both Chief Engineers were British so they chose the widely used wrought iron lattice truss bridge in the half-through form. Twelve of these were built for the railways and 24 for roads. These two sets of iron lattice bridges are the most significant group of bridges of the colonial period. A high percentage are extant and still in use, 10 on railways and 18 on roads.

The current railway lattice bridges are:

- 1876 – Macquarie River bridge at Bathurst
- 1881 – Macquarie River at Wellington
- 1882 – Peel River bridge at Tamworth
- 1882 – MacDonald River bridge at Woolbrook
- 1884 – Murray River bridge at Albury
- 1884 – Macquarie River bridge at Dubbo
- 1885 – Murrumbidgee River at Narrandera
- 1887 – Lachlan River bridge at Cowra

Two former railway lattice bridges (1885 Georges River at Como and the 1886 Parramatta River bridge at Meadowbank) were converted for use by pedestrian/cycle ways.

The 1871 lattice railway bridge over the Hunter River at Aberdeen was replaced by steel girders and demolished.

=== Murrumbidgee River Bridge at Narrandera ===
The bridge was built in 1884–85 by Halliday and Owen, the contractors for the overall Narrandera-Jerilderie railway project. It was reported to be the only great engineering challenge on that stretch of line. A temporary bridge was erected during construction which carried the initial services over the river. Delays in the completion of the permanent bridge resulted in the formal opening of the line being delayed until July 1885.

The Tocumwal railway line was formally closed in December 1988. The possibility of reopening the Tocumwal line remains a subject of occasional discussion, with reports supporting returning the bridge to active use were the line to reopen.

== Description ==
The Murrumbidgee River railway bridge at Narrandera is a two-span continuous iron lattice bridge. The spans are 48 metres (159 ft) to centres of piers and the lattice work has four triangulations.

The piers are pairs of cast iron cylinders (supplied by Stockton Forge Co, England).

The bridge carries a single 4 ft 8 1/2 in (1,435 mm) standard gauge railway with transomes on metal stringers with metal crossgirders resting on the lower chords. The main trusses are through type lattice trusses, continuous over two 48.5-metre (159 ft) spans. They are connected together above the track by characteristic arched latticed braces. They are supported on twin cast iron cylinder piers. The superstructure was fabricated by Westwood, Baillie; Halliday and Owen were the principal contractors. It was placed in service in May 1885.

It was reported to be in good physical condition as at 26 April 2006. It retains its original fabric apart from relatively minor technical works of repair and strengthening.

A 2012 report stated that the bridge "appears to be sound and would be likely to require only minimal repair and upgrade works" were it to be returned to use.

== Heritage listing ==
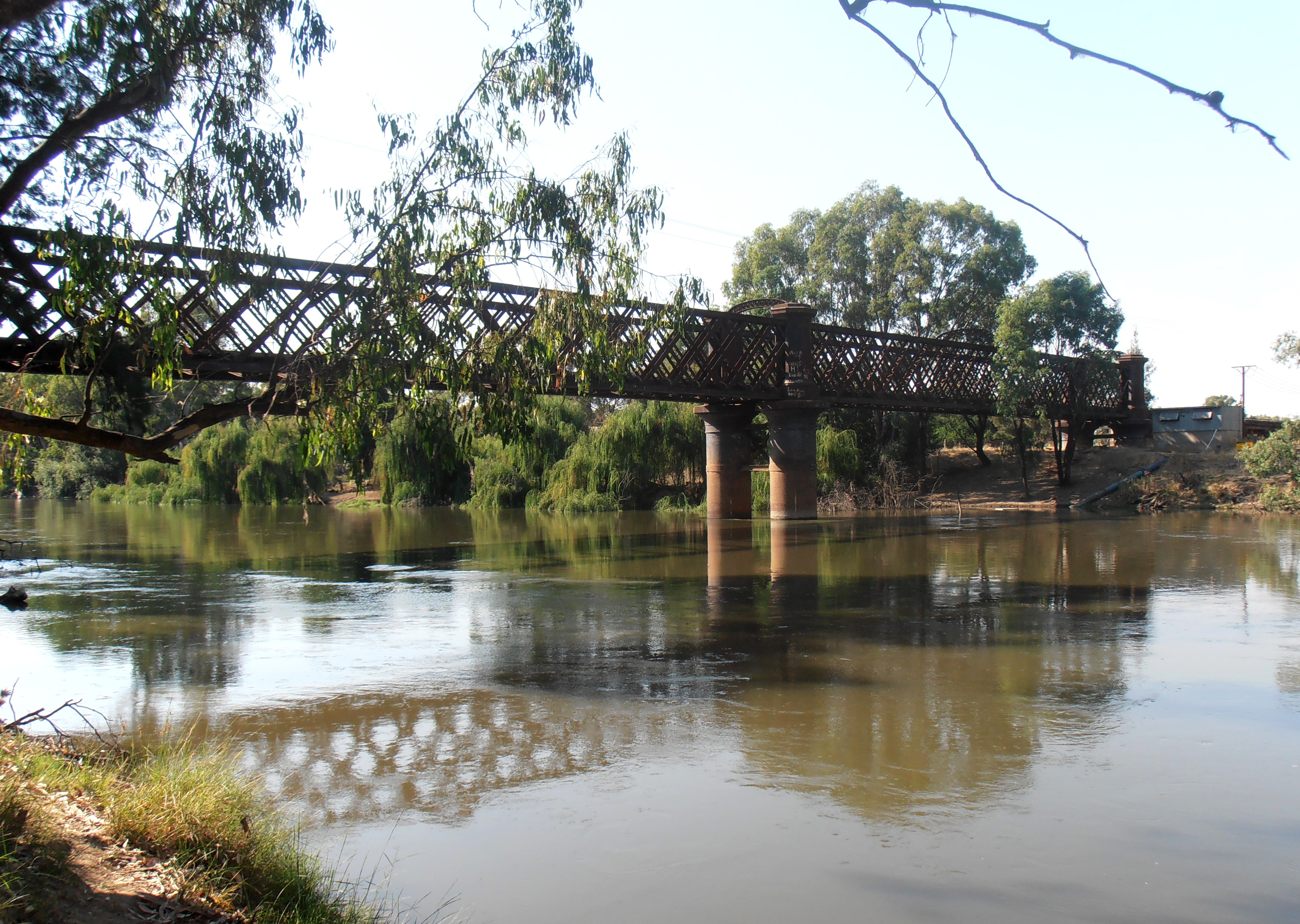
Narrandera railway bridge

This bridge is a member of the most significant group of colonial bridges in New South Wales. Collectively, as items of railway infrastructure, it contributed significantly to the history and development of New South Wales. The bridge is an imposing structure at its site. In terms of contemporary bridge technology the wrought iron lattice bridge was among the best for major bridgeworks.

Narrandera rail bridge over Murrumbidgee River was listed on the New South Wales State Heritage Register on 2 April 1999 having satisfied the following criteria.

The place is important in demonstrating the course, or pattern, of cultural or natural history in New South Wales.

Twelve wrought iron lattice railway bridges were built in New South Wales during the boom period for railway construction 1871-1887, starting at Aberdeen and ending at Cowra. Nine of the survivors are owned and managed by the Rail Access Corporation.

The place is important in demonstrating aesthetic characteristics and/or a high degree of creative or technical achievement in New South Wales.

All nine iron lattice railway bridges are imposing structures.

The place has a strong or special association with a particular community or cultural group in New South Wales for social, cultural or spiritual reasons.

Every iron lattice railway bridge crossed a major river which made it possible for the railway extension to develop the districts reached, socially and commercially

The place has potential to yield information that will contribute to an understanding of the cultural or natural history of New South Wales.

The iron lattice bridge was a technically sound structure for the bridge technology of the late colonial period. Its strength and durability have shown it to have been a very cost-effective form of bridge.

The place is important in demonstrating the principal characteristics of a class of cultural or natural places/environments in New South Wales.

Collectively, the iron lattice railway bridges represent a significant class of bridge structure.

== See also ==
- List of railway bridges in New South Wales
