= Peel River railway bridge, Tamworth =

- Coordinates: 31°05′06″S 150°55′24″E
- Carries: Main North line
- Crosses: Peel River
- Locale: Tamworth, Tamworth Regional Council, New South Wales, Australia
- Begins: North Tamworth (north)
- Ends: Taminda (south)
- Other names: Tamworth rail bridge over Peel River; Tamworth Lattice Railway Bridge
- Owner: Transport Asset Manager of New South Wales

Characteristics
- Design: Lattice girder bridge
- Material: Wrought iron
- Pier construction: Cast iron
- Total length: 48 metres (157 ft)
- Longest span: 48 metres (157 ft)
- No. of spans: 1

Rail characteristics
- No. of tracks: One
- Track gauge: 4 ft 8 1/2 in (1,435 mm) standard gauge

History
- Designer: Sir John Fowler for John Whitton
- Constructed by: J. S. Bennett
- Fabrication by: J. & C. Brettell, Worcester, England (ironwork)
- Construction end: 1881
- Opened: 9 January 1882

New South Wales Heritage Register
- Official name: Tamworth rail bridge over Peel River; Tamworth Lattice Railway Bridge
- Type: State heritage (built)
- Designated: 2 April 1999
- Reference no.: 1058
- Type: Railway Bridge/Viaduct
- Category: Transport – Rail
- Builders: J. S. Bennett; J. & C. Brettell, Worcester, England (ironwork)

Location
- Interactive map of Peel River railway bridge, Tamworth

The Peel River railway bridge is a heritage-listed railway bridge that carries the Main North line across the Peel River connecting North Tamworth to Taminda, both in the Tamworth Regional Council local government area of New South Wales, Australia. The railway bridge was designed by John Whitton as the Engineer-in-Chief for Railways and built during 1882 by J. S. Bennett, with iron work by J. & C. Brettell, Worcester, England. The bridge is also known as the Tamworth rail bridge over Peel River and the Tamworth Lattice Railway Bridge. The property is owned by Transport Asset Manager of New South Wales, an agency of the Government of New South Wales. The bridge was added to the New South Wales State Heritage Register on 2 April 1999 and was added to the (now defunct) Register of the National Estate on 18 April 1989.

The bridge is located 454.125 kilometres (282.180 mi) from Sydney Central station.

== History ==
During the 20-year period 1873–1893 there was a massive programme of public works in New South Wales, particularly in expanding the road and rail networks. It was a boom period that ended with a severe economic depression.

Despite the boom conditions, the respective Chief Engineers, for Roads (William C. Bennett) and for Railways (John Whitton) were constrained to economise by using as much local material as possible, consequently an enormous amount of hardwood timber was used for bridgeworks, mostly timber beam and timber truss bridges.

However, there were many major rivers to be crossed, requiring long span bridges, for which no form of timber bridge was suitable. These large bridges had to be metal and supplied from England, a very expensive import cost to the successive colonial governments.

Both Chief Engineers were British so they chose the widely used wrought iron lattice truss bridge in the half-through form. Twelve of these were built for the railways and 24 for roads. These two sets of iron lattice bridges are the most significant group of bridges of the colonial period. A high percentage are extant and still in use, eleven on railways and eighteen on roads.

The current railway lattice bridges are:

- 1876 – Macquarie River railway bridge at Bathurst
- 1881 – Murrumbidgee River railway bridge at Wagga Wagga
- 1881 – Macquarie River at Wellington
- 1882 – Peel River at Tamworth
- 1882 – Macdonald River railway bridge at Woolbrook
- 1884 – Murray River railway bridge at Albury–Wodonga
- 1884 – Macquarie River railway bridge at Dubbo
- 1885 – Murrumbidgee River railway bridge at Narrandera
- 1887 – Lachlan River railway bridge at Cowra

Two former railway lattice bridges (1885 Georges River railway bridge at Como and 1886 Parramatta River railway bridge at Meadowbank) were converted for use by pedestrian/cycle ways.

The 1871 lattice railway bridge over the Hunter River at Aberdeen was replaced by steel girders and demolished.

== Description ==
A single-span wrought iron lattice bridge. The span is 48-metre (159 ft) to centres of piers and the lattice work has seven triangulations. The piers are pairs of cast iron cylinders, supplied by the Stockton Forge Co., England.

The bridge carries a single 4 ft 8 1/2 in (1,435 mm) standard gauge railway, with transomes on timber stringers on metal cross girders, which frame into the sides of the lower chords. The main trusses are simply supported, through type lattice trusses. They are of constant depth with seven triangulations and are connected together above the track by characteristic arched latticed braces. The trusses rest on twin, cast iron cylinder piers. There are extensive approaches, particularly on the south side. The superstructure was fabricated by J. and C. Brettell, Worcestor, England; A. and R. Amos were the principal contractors. It was load tested on 16 November 1881 and placed in service on 9 January 1882.

=== Condition ===
As at 16 March 2006, the physical condition was good. Apart from relatively minor technical works of repair and strengthening, all the iron lattice railway bridges retain their original fabrics.

== Heritage listing ==
As at 16 March 2006, this bridge was a member of the most significant group of colonial bridges in New South Wales. Collectively, as items of railway infrastructure, they contributed significantly to the history and development of New South Wales. Each bridge is an imposing structure at its site. In terms of contemporary bridge technology the wrought iron lattice bridge was among the best for major bridgeworks.

The bridge built in 1882 is one of the original iron lattice Whitton bridges and is an important surviving element from the most significant period of railway development. It is an excellent example in an important railway town. The building of such a relatively large structure on this cross country line reflects the importance that the railway administration gave to this line to provide an outlet for coal from Lithgow, and produce from central NSW, to reach the south and Victoria and vice versa.

Tamworth rail bridge over Peel River was listed on the New South Wales State Heritage Register on 2 April 1999 having satisfied the following criteria.

The place is important in demonstrating the course, or pattern, of cultural or natural history in New South Wales.

Twelve wrought iron lattice railway bridges were built in New South Wales during the boom period for railway construction 1871–1887, starting at Aberdeen and ending at Cowra. Nine of the survivors are owned and managed by the RailCorp.

The place is important in demonstrating aesthetic characteristics and/or a high degree of creative or technical achievement in New South Wales.

All nine iron lattice railway bridges are imposing structures.

The place has a strong or special association with a particular community or cultural group in New South Wales for social, cultural or spiritual reasons.

Every iron lattice railway bridge crossed a major river which made it possible for the railway extension to develop the districts reached, socially and commercially.

The place has potential to yield information that will contribute to an understanding of the cultural or natural history of New South Wales.

The iron lattice bridge was a technically sound structure for the bridge technology of the late colonial period. Its strength and durability have shown it to have been a very cost-effective form of bridge.

The place is important in demonstrating the principal characteristics of a class of cultural or natural places/environments in New South Wales.

Collectively, the iron lattice railway bridges represent a significant class of bridge structure.

== See also ==
- List of railway bridges in New South Wales
