= Macquarie River railway bridge, Dubbo =

Macquarie River Railway Bridge, Dubbo
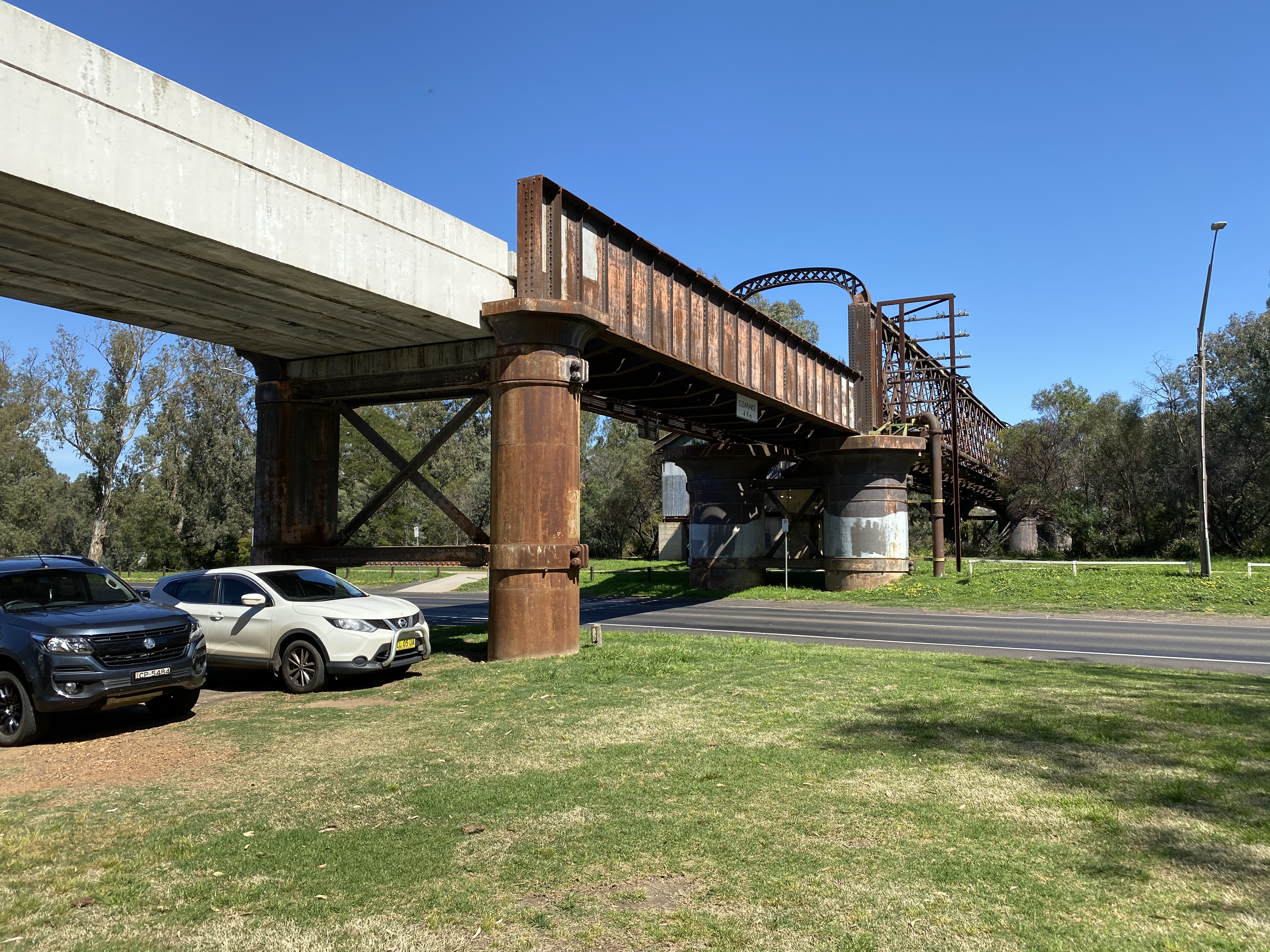
- Coordinates: 32°14′38″S 148°35′59″E
- Carries: Main Western railway line
- Crosses: Macquarie River
- Locale: Dubbo, New South Wales, Australia
- Official name: Dubbo rail bridge over Macquarie River
- Other name: Dubbo Lattice Railway Bridge
- Owner: Transport Asset Manager of New South Wales

Characteristics
- Design: Lattice bridge
- Material: Wrought iron
- Pier construction: Cast iron cylinders
- Longest span: 48 metres (159 ft)
- No. of spans: 3

Rail characteristics
- No. of tracks: One
- Track gauge: 4 ft 8 1/2 in (1,435 mm) standard gauge

History
- Architect: John Whitton; Engineer-in-Chief for Railways
- Designer: Sir John Fowler
- Constructed by: Benjamin Barnes
- Fabrication by: Ironwork by Cochrane & Co., Middlesborough, England
- Construction end: 1884

New South Wales Heritage Register
- Type: State heritage (built)
- Designated: 2 April 1999
- Reference no.: 1032
- Type: Railway Bridge/Viaduct
- Category: Transport – Rail

Location
- Interactive map of Macquarie River Railway Bridge, Dubbo

The Dubbo rail bridge over Macquarie River – Wambuul is a heritage-listed railway bridge on the Main Western line across the Macquarie River, located west of the Dubbo central business district in New South Wales, Australia. It was designed by John Whitton as the Engineer-in-Chief for the New South Wales Government Railways. The bridge was built during 1884 by Benjamin Barnes, with ironwork by Cochrane & Co, Middlesborough, England. The railway bridge is also known as the Dubbo Lattice Railway Bridge. The property is owned by Transport Asset Manager of New South Wales, an agency of the Government of New South Wales. The bridge was added to the New South Wales State Heritage Register on 2 April 1999 and was listed on the (now defunct) Register of the National Estate on 18 April 1989.

The bridge is sited 462.762 kilometres (287.547 mi) from Sydney Central station.

== History ==
During the 20-year period 1873–1893 there was a massive programme of public works in New South Wales, particularly in expanding the road and rail networks. It was a boom period that ended with a severe economic depression.

Despite the boom conditions, the respective Chief Engineers, for Roads, William C. Bennett, and for Railways, John Whitton, were constrained to economise by using as much local material as possible, consequently an enormous amount of hardwood timber was used for bridgeworks, mostly timber beam and timber truss bridges. However, there were many major rivers to be crossed, requiring long span bridges, for which no form of timber bridge was suitable. These large bridges had to be metal and supplied from England, a very expensive import cost to the successive colonial governments.

Both Chief Engineers were British so they chose the widely used wrought iron lattice truss bridge in the half-through form. Twelve of these were built for the railways and 24 for roads. These two sets of iron lattice bridges are the most significant group of bridges of the colonial period. A high percentage are extant and still in use, 11 on railways and 18 on roads. The current railway lattice bridges are:

- 1876 – Bathurst Rail Bridge over Macquarie River - still standing but not in use
- 1881 – Macquarie River at Wellington
- 1882 – Peel River railway bridge at Tamworth
- 1882 – Macdonald River railway bridge at Woolbrook
- 1884 – Albury-Wodonga Railway Bridge
- 1884 – Macquarie River at Dubbo
- 1885 – Murrumbidgee River railway bridge at Narrandera
- 1887 – Lachlan River railway bridge at Cowra.

Two former railway lattice bridges (1885 Georges River at Como and 1886 Parramatta River at Meadowbank) were converted for use by pedestrian/cycle ways.

The 1871 lattice railway bridge over the Hunter River at Aberdeen was replaced by steel girders and demolished. The 1881 Murrumbidgee River at Wagga Wagga was demolished in 2006 and replaced with a concrete structure.

== Description ==
A three-span continuous iron lattice bridge. The spans are 48 metres (159 ft) to centres of piers and the lattice work has four triangulations. The piers of pairs of cast iron cylinders (supplied by Cochrane & Co, England). The bridge has wrought iron plate web girders at each end of the lattice bridge.

The bridge carries a single 4 ft 8 1/2 in (1,435 mm) standard gauge railway with transomes on metal cross girders resting on the lower chords. The main trusses are through type lattice trusses, continuous over three 48.5-metre (159 ft) spans. They are of constant depth with four triangulations and are connected together above the track by characteristic arched, latticed braces. They are supported on twin, cast iron cylinder piers. The bridge as a whole has spans as follows: eighteen at 7.9 metres (26 ft), two at 20.7 metres (68 ft), three at 48.5 metres (159 ft), two at 20.9 metres (69 ft), twenty one at 7.9 metres (26 ft). The 20.9-metre (69 ft) spans are metal girders. The thirty nine 7.9-metre (26 ft) spans are timber girders with transomes, squared girders and corbels, a single squared headstock on each pier and round timber piles. The superstructure was fabricated by Cochrane and Company, Middlesbrough, England; A. and R. Amos were the principal contractors. It was load tested on 23 April and placed in service in May 1884.

The bridge and approaches are significant technical accomplishments. Completed in 1884, it has three main lattice truss spans, each of 48.5 metres (159 ft). It is one of a series of twelve related bridges all with 48.5-metre (159 ft) lattice trusses, built between 1871 and 1887, of which eleven remain. The bridge at Dubbo is the first of the second group of six, all of which incorporated some design changes compared with the first six. Of the series of twelve, three earlier bridges had three spans, one had four and another two were single span. The span of 48.5 metres (159 ft) was considerable for a bridge of this age and type. The approaches include thirty nine 7.9-metre (26 ft) timber girder spans and these are significant in their own right. The sum of spans of 309 metres (1,014 ft) was probably exceeded previously by only one or two bridges; the approach viaduct to the rail bridge across the Murrumbidgee River at Wagga Wagga (1881, 2,842 metres (9,324 ft) total) and possibly the original road bridge across the Helena River at Guildford, Western Australia (1865, 310 metres (1,020 ft)), neither of which remain in their original form. Although it may be expected that members of the Dubbo approaches have been replaced, they remain a good example of the Whitton-type timber viaduct with squared girders and single solid headstocks. As with all others in the series, the bridge was designed by Sir John Fowler (co-designer of the World Heritage-listed Firth of Forth Bridge) for Whitton.

=== Condition ===
As at 10 August 2006, the physical condition was good.

== Heritage listing ==
As at 10 August 2006, the bridge at the end of the yard is one of John Whitton's single track lattice bridges which were typical of the period of construction and is of high significance to the state system. The viaduct in leading to the actual bridge was originally timber but has been replaced by PWG steel.

This bridge is a member of the most significant group of colonial bridges in New South Wales. Collectively, as items of railway infrastructure, they contributed significantly to the history and development of New South Wales. Each bridge is an imposing structure at its site. In terms of contemporary bridge technology the wrought iron lattice bridge was among the best for major bridgeworks.

Dubbo rail bridge over Macquarie River was listed on the New South Wales State Heritage Register on 2 April 1999 having satisfied the following criteria.

The place is important in demonstrating the course, or pattern, of cultural or natural history in New South Wales.

Twelve wrought iron lattice railway bridges were built in New South Wales during the boom period for railway construction 1871–1887, starting at Aberdeen and ending at Cowra. Nine of the survivors are owned and managed by the Rail Access Corporation.

The place is important in demonstrating aesthetic characteristics and/or a high degree of creative or technical achievement in New South Wales.

All nine iron lattice railway bridges are imposing structures.

The place has a strong or special association with a particular community or cultural group in New South Wales for social, cultural or spiritual reasons.

Every iron lattice railway bridge crossed a major river which made it possible for the railway extension to develop the districts reached, socially and commercially.

The place has potential to yield information that will contribute to an understanding of the cultural or natural history of New South Wales.

The iron lattice bridge was a technically sound structure for the bridge technology of the late colonial period. Its strength and durability have shown it to have been a very cost-effective form of bridge.

The place is important in demonstrating the principal characteristics of a class of cultural or natural places/environments in New South Wales.

Collectively, the iron lattice railway bridges represent a significant class of bridge structure.

== See also ==
- List of railway bridges in New South Wales
