= Murray River railway bridge, Albury–Wodonga =

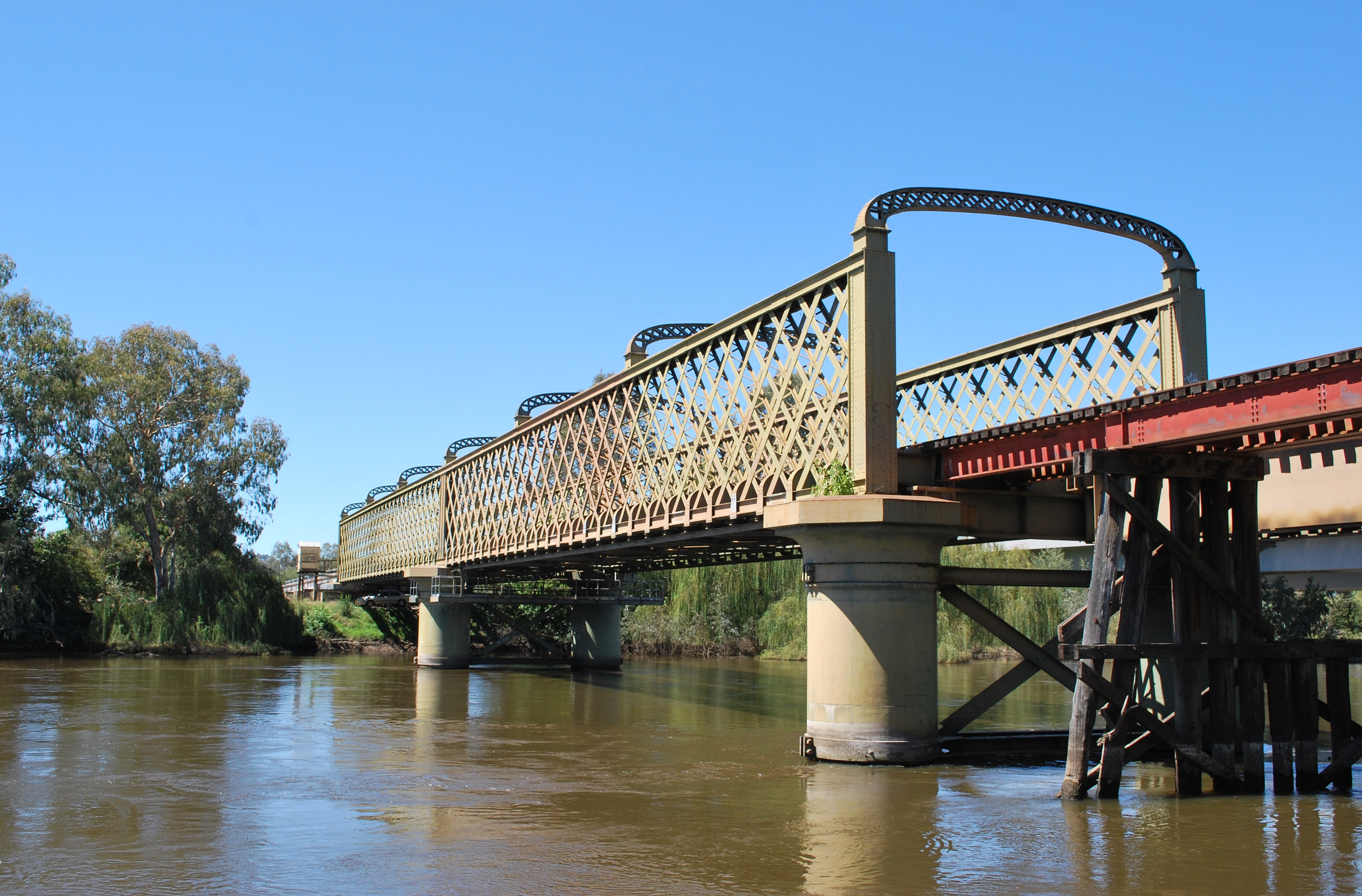
- Location of Murray River railway bridge, on the border between New South Wales and Victoria, at Albury-Wodonga
- Coordinates: 36°06′00″S 146°54′34″E
- Carries: Main Southern line; North East railway line
- Crosses: Murray River
- Locale: Albury, New South Wales, Australia
- Begins: Albury (north)
- Ends: Wodonga, Victoria (south)
- Other names: Rail Bridge over Murray River, Albury–Wodonga; Albury Lattice Railway Bridge; Murray River Underbridge
- Owner: Transport Asset Manager of New South Wales
- Maintained by: Australian Rail Track Corporation

Rail characteristics
- No. of tracks: Two
- Track gauge: 5 ft 3 in (1,600 mm) (1884–2011); 4 ft 8 1/2 in (1,435 mm) standard gauge (since 1884)

History
- Designer: Sir John Fowler for John Whitton
- Constructed by: J. S. Bennett
- Fabrication by: Westwood, Baillie, England
- Construction start: 1883
- Construction end: 1884
- Construction cost: A£32,519.19.0

New South Wales Heritage Register
- Official name: Albury rail bridge over Murray River; Albury Lattice Railway Bridge; Murray River Underbridge
- Type: State heritage (built)
- Designated: 2 April 1999
- Reference no.: 1020
- Type: Railway Bridge/Viaduct
- Category: Transport – Rail
- Builders: J. S. Bennett; Westwood, Baillie, England (ironwork)

Location
- Interactive map of Murray River railway bridge, Albury–Wodonga

The Murray River railway bridge is a heritage-listed Australian railway bridge over the Murray River on the Main Southern line south of Albury, New South Wales, and on the North Eastern line north of Wodonga in Victoria. The bridge was designed by John Whitton and built from 1883 to 1884 by J. S. Bennett, with iron work supplied by Westwood, Baillie, England. It is also known as the Rail Bridge over Murray River, Albury–Wodonga and the Albury Lattice Railway Bridge and Murray River Underbridge. The bridge is owned by RailCorp, and maintained by the Australian Rail Track Corporation as part of its lease of the line. It was added to the New South Wales State Heritage Register on 2 April 1999, and added to the (now defunct) Register of the National Estate on 18 April 1989.

The bridge is located 648.465 kilometres (402.937 mi) from Sydney Central railway station.

== History ==
During the 20-year period between 1873 and 1893, there was a massive programme of public works in New South Wales, particularly in expanding the road and rail networks. During this period and despite strong economic conditions, the respective chief engineers, for roads (William C. Bennett) and for railways (John Whitton), adopted economic construction methods and materials, for example by using local materials where possible. Consequently, an enormous amount of hardwood timber was used for bridge works; mostly timber beam and timber truss bridges.

However, long-span bridges were required for major river crossings, making timber bridge construction unsuitable at many locations. Metal bridge construction was adopted for larger bridges at major river crossings with metal supplied from England. Whitton adopted the use of wrought iron lattice truss bridges, with twelve such bridges built for the NSW Railways in the late 19th century and 24 wrought iron bridges built for roads.

Many of these bridges (for road and rail) remain extant in NSW, including railway lattice bridges at:

- 1876 – Macquarie River bridge at Bathurst (no longer in use, c. 2005)
- 1881 – Macquarie River at Wellington
- 1882 – Peel River bridge at Tamworth
- 1882 – MacDonald River bridge at Woolbrook
- 1884 – Murray River bridge at Albury
- 1884 – Macquarie River bridge at Dubbo
- 1885 – Murrumbidgee River bridge at Narrandera
- 1887 – Lachlan River bridge at Cowra

The Albury Murray River Bridge consists of two 48.463-metre (159 ft) wrought iron lattice girder trusses, a steel opening transom top, and cast iron piers. The cylinders, made by Stockton Forge Co. in the UK and weighed 290 tonnes (290 long tons; 320 short tons); and the superstructure, made by Westwood Baillie & Co. and weighed 594 tonnes (585 long tons; 655 short tons) were delivered between 3 April 1883 and 11 June 1883.

The bridge was part of a series designed by Sir John Fowler (co-designer of the World Heritage-listed Firth of Forth Bridge in Scotland) for Whitton. The bridge was load-tested on 24 September and put into service on 18 October 1884. It remains in use today.

The total cost of the bridge was estimated at A£32,519.19.0, including:

- Cylinders, superstructure: £12,313.0.3
- Railway carriage of above: £5,318.19.9
- Sinking & fixing of cylinders: £10,005.3.9
- Erecting superstructure: £3,775.3.3
- Cost of trial borings: £2,11.5.0
- Permanent Way materials on bridge: £103.3.7
- Engineer's expenses for supervisor: £793.3.5

Few major modifications have been made to the Albury Bridge with the most significant change probably being the opening of a Standard Gauge track linking Albury to Melbourne on 12 April 1962, with normal passenger services commencing on 16 April 1962.

Two former railway lattice bridges (1885 Georges River bridge at Como and 1886 Parramatta River bridge at Meadowbank) were decommissioned for railway use but remain in use as pedestrian walkways /cycle ways. The 1871 wrought iron rail bridge over the Hunter River at Aberdeen was replaced by another bridge and demolished and the 1881 rail bridge over the Murrumbidgee River at Wagga Wagga was demolished in 2006, and replaced by a concrete structure.

== Description ==
The Albury Murray River Bridge is a double-track 4 ft 8 1/2 in (1,435 mm) standard gauge, three-span wrought iron lattice underbridge. It is a two span continuous lattice bridge with overhead transverse frames for stabilising the top flanges. The spans are 48 metres (159 ft) to centres of piers and the lattice work has six triangulations. The piers are pairs of cast iron cylinders supplied by Stockton Forge Co. from England. It is the only double track lattice bridge in service, the other was at Meadowbank, and is one of the second set of six wrought iron lattice bridges with 4-triangular lattice. It was also the first of the two-track lattice bridges constructed on the NSW railway system.

The bridge is one of a series of twelve related bridges, all with 48.5-metre (159 ft) lattice trusses, built between 1871 and 1887, of which eleven remain. The twelve bridges were in two groups. The first consisted of the Hunter River Bridge at Aberdeen (1871), the Macquarie River Bridge at Bathurst (1876), the Murrumbidgee River Bridge at Wagga (1881), across the Macquarie River at Wellington (1881), and the single-span bridges across the Peel River at Tamworth (1882) and the Macdonald River at Woolbrook (1882). Comprising the second group were the Macquarie River Bridge at Dubbo (1884), the Murray River Bridge at Albury (1884), the Murrumbidgee River Bridge at Narrandera (1885), the Georges River Bridge at Como (1885), the Parramatta River Bridge at Ryde (1886) and the Lachlan River Bridge at Cowra (1887).

Albury was thus the second of the second group, which introduced various design changes compared with the first six. In particular, the bridge at Albury was the first to carry a double-track and is the only two-track bridge of the series to remain in service under railway traffic. From 1884 until 2011, the bridge had one track in 4 ft 8 1/2 in (1,435 mm) standard gauge, to comply with New South Wales standard gauge; and the second track in 5 ft 3 in (1,600 mm), to complex with Victorian broad gauge. In 2011 the Victorian broad gauge track was replaced with standard gauge.

It is also the first to have two spans, the earlier bridges having one, three or four spans. The bridge now carries a double-track 4 ft 8 1/2 in (1,435 mm) standard gauge railway. The original design had transoms on metal stringers with metal cross girders resting on the lower chords. The eastern track has been modified in recent years by inserting a pair of large steel girders beneath the original transoms, with concrete piers replacing the timber piles supports on the southern approaches. A pedestrian walkway has been added on the eastern side. The western track appears to be in its original configuration. The main trusses are through type lattice trusses, continuous over two 48.5m spans (spans of this length are considerable for a bridge of this type and date). The trusses are of constant depth with six triangulations and are connected together above the tracks by characteristic arched latticed braces. They are supported on twin cast iron cylinder piers.

=== Condition ===
The line remains in use. It was reported as being in satisfactory condition in 2008. Apart from relatively minor technical works, repairs and strengthening, the Albury bridge is highly intact. One of the tracks is currently disused and the line to Albury operates as single track.

== Heritage listing ==
The wrought iron lattice Albury Murray River underbridge is a major early structure associated with the "father" of the NSW railways, John Whitton, and geographically linked to Albury Railway Precinct, one of the most significant railway sites in the NSW. It is an excellent example of a wrought iron lattice bridge, a design that was used extensively for bridge construction during the first major phase of railway construction in NSW in the late 19th century. It is a historically and aesthetically significant structure and a prominent landmark on the NSW/Victoria border.

It is one of only two double track bridges of this design, the other being the wrought iron lattice Parramatta River bridge at Meadowbank (no longer in use for rail traffic) and is still in use, carrying both standard gauge (NSW) and broad gauge (Victorian) railway lines. It is the seventh oldest lattice bridge in the NSW rail system, being constructed in the second phase of wrought iron lattice bridge construction (one of the second set of six such bridges).

Albury rail bridge over Murray River was listed on the New South Wales State Heritage Register on 2 April 1999 having satisfied the following criteria.

The place is important in demonstrating the course, or pattern, of cultural or natural history in New South Wales.

Twelve wrought iron lattice railway bridges were built in NSW during the boom period for railway construction 1871–1887, starting at Aberdeen and ending at Cowra. Eight of the bridges survive for rail use, and two have been converted for pedestrian use.

The place has a strong or special association with a person, or group of persons, of importance of cultural or natural history of New South Wales's history.

Associated with Engineer-in-Chief of the NSW Railways, the "father" of the NSW railways.

The place is important in demonstrating aesthetic characteristics and/or a high degree of creative or technical achievement in New South Wales.

The wrought iron lattice railway bridge at Albury is an imposing structure.

The place has a strong or special association with a particular community or cultural group in New South Wales for social, cultural or spiritual reasons.

Every wrought iron lattice railway bridge crossed a major river which made it possible for the railways to make a social and commercial contribution to the districts reached by the railway.

The place has potential to yield information that will contribute to an understanding of the cultural or natural history of New South Wales.

The wrought iron lattice bridge is a technically sound structure and as such is an example of bridge technology in the late colonial period in NSW (late 19th century). Its strength and durability have shown it to have been a very cost-effective form of bridge construction.

The place is important in demonstrating the principal characteristics of a class of cultural or natural places/environments in New South Wales.

The Albury Murray River wrought iron lattice bridge is an excellent representative example of a series of similar bridges constructed by the NSW railways in the late 19th century, most of which remain extant.

== See also ==
- List of railway bridges in New South Wales

Next bridge upstream	Murray River	Next bridge downstream
Spirit of Progress Bridge (Hume Motorway)	Murray River railway bridge, Albury–Wodonga	Lincoln Causeway/ Union Bridge
