= Macquarie River railway bridge =

Macquarie River railway bridge may refer to one of two bridges crossing the Macquarie River in New South Wales, Australia:

- Macquarie River railway bridge, Bathurst, crossing the Macquarie River in Bathurst, built 1876
- Macquarie River railway bridge, Dubbo, crossing the Macquarie River in Dubbo, built 1884
