= Lachlan River railway bridge =

Lachlan River railway bridge, Cowra
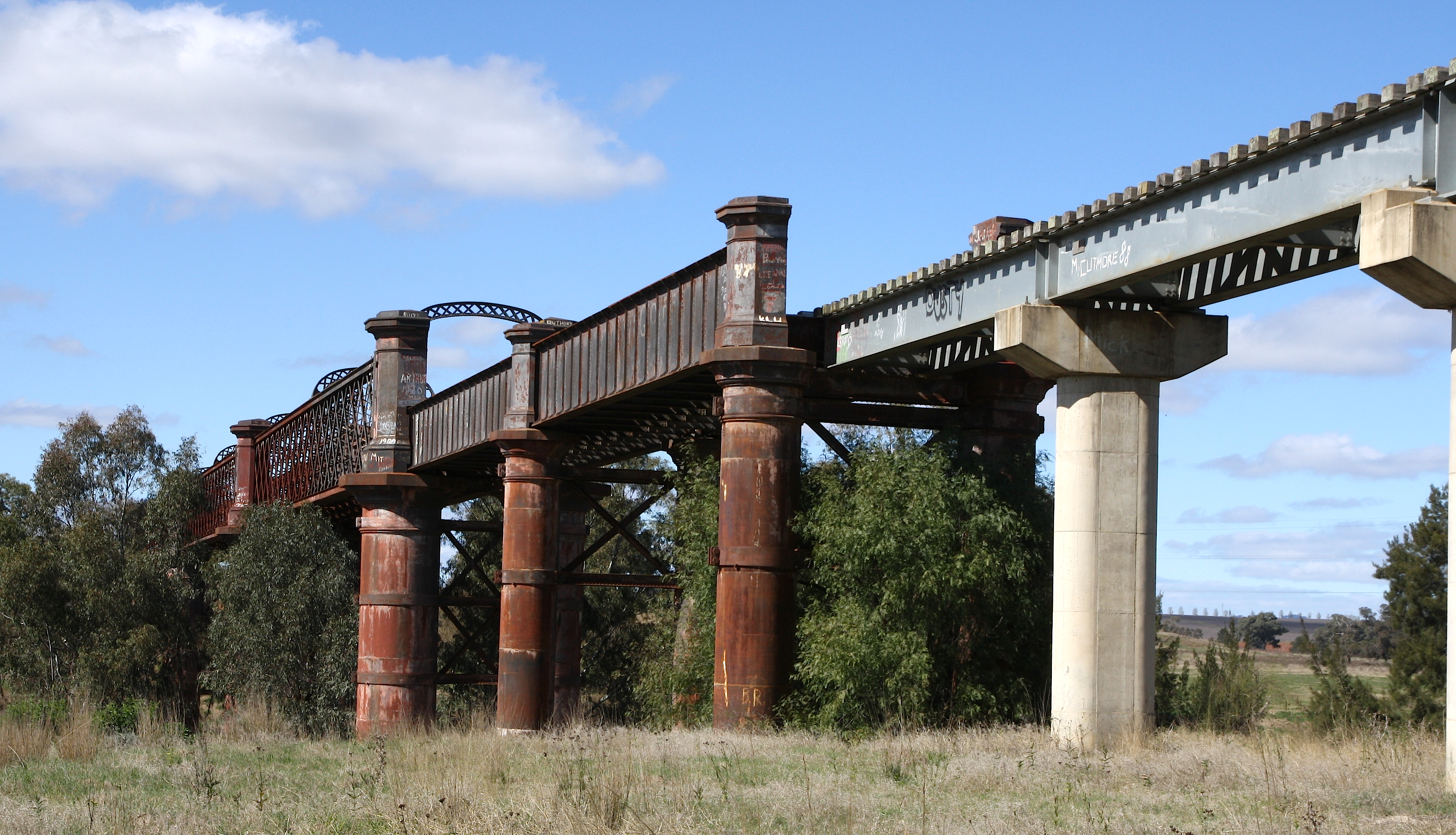
- Railway bridge over the Lachlan River south of Cowra, showing the original iron section opened in 1887 and newer concrete piers, pictured in 2011
- Coordinates: 33°51′02″S 148°40′57″E
- Carries: Blayney–Demondrille railway line
- Crosses: Lachlan River
- Locale: Cowra, Cowra Shire, New South Wales, Australia
- Owner: Transport Asset Manager of New South Wales

Characteristics
- Design: Truss bridge
- Material: Wrought iron lattice
- Pier construction: Cast iron (original); Concrete (new)
- Total length: 144 metres (472 ft)
- Longest span: 48 metres (159 ft)
- No. of spans: 3

Rail characteristics
- Track gauge: 4 ft 8 1/2 in (1,435 mm) standard gauge

History
- Designer: John Whitton; Engineer-in-Chief for Railways
- Constructed by: Fishburn & Co.
- Construction start: 1886
- Construction end: 1887
- Opened: 9 September 1887

New South Wales Heritage Register
- Official name: Cowra rail bridge over Lachlan River; Cowra Lattice Railway Bridge
- Type: State heritage (built)
- Designated: 2 April 1999
- Reference no.: 1031
- Type: Railway Bridge/Viaduct
- Category: Transport – Rail
- Builders: D. & W. Robertson; A. Lecoq, Halle, Belgium (ironwork)

Location
- Interactive map of Lachlan River railway bridge, Cowra

The Lachlan River railway bridge is a heritage-listed disused railway bridge which carries the Blayney–Demondrille railway line over the Lachlan River at Cowra, Cowra Shire, New South Wales, Australia. It was designed by John Whitton in his capacity as Engineer-in-Chief for Railways. The bridge was built from 1886 to 1887 by contractors Fishburn & Co. It is also known as the Cowra Rail Bridge over Lachlan River and the Cowra Lattice Railway Bridge. The property is owned by Transport Asset Manager of New South Wales, an agency of the Government of New South Wales. It was added to the New South Wales State Heritage Register on 2 April 1999.

== History ==
Tenders for the section of line including the bridge were advertised in February 1885. The bridge was completed in sixteen months, with no accidents even though it was at the time the highest bridge in New South Wales. A temporary bridge to facilitate access for contractors and machinery had to be erected, and work proceeded even though the river was in partial flood at several times during works. The official opening of the Young-Cowra section of line took place on 25 August 1886; however, trains could only proceed as far as the river, as the bridge works were not complete. The last rivet was placed in June 1877, and the bridge was opened to passengers for the first time on 9 September 1877.

== Description ==
The Cowra Rail Bridge over the Lachlan River is a three-span continuous iron lattice bridge. The spans are 48 metres (159 ft) to centres of piers and the lattice work has four triangulations. The piers are pairs of cast iron cylinders (supplied by Stockton Forge Co, England). The bridge has wrought iron plate web girders at each end of the lattice bridge.

Apart from relatively minor technical works of repair and strengthening, the bridge retains its original fabric.

== Significance ==
During the 20-year period 1873–1893 there was a massive program of public works in New South Wales, particularly in expanding the road and rail networks. It was a boom period that ended with a severe economic depression.

Despite the boom conditions, the respective Chief Engineers, for Roads (William C. Bennett) and for Railways (John Whitton) were constrained to economise by using as much local material as possible, consequently an enormous amount of hardwood timber was used for bridge works, mostly timber beam and timber truss bridges. However, there were many major rivers to be crossed, requiring long span bridges, for which no form of timber bridge was suitable. These large bridges had to be metal and supplied from England, a very expensive import cost to the successive colonial governments.

Both Chief Engineers were British so they chose the widely used wrought iron lattice truss bridge in the half-through form. Twelve of these were built for the railways and 24 for roads. These two sets of iron lattice bridges are the most significant group of bridges of the colonial period. A high percentage are extant and still in use, 11 on railways and 18 on roads.

The current railway lattice bridges are:

- 1876 – Bathurst Rail Bridge over Macquarie River – still standing but no longer in use
- 1881 – Macquarie River at Wellington
- 1882 – Peel River at Tamworth
- 1882 – MacDonald River at Woolbrook
- 1884 – Rail Bridge over Murray River, Albury–Wodonga
- 1884 – Macquarie River Railway Bridge, Dubbo
- 1885 – Murrumbidgee River at Narrandera
- 1887 – Lachlan River at Cowra.

Two former railway lattice bridges (1885 Georges River at Como and the 1886 Meadowbank Rail Bridge over Parramatta River) were converted for use by pedestrian/cycle ways.

The 1871 lattice railway bridge over the Hunter River at Aberdeen was replaced by steel girders and demolished. The 1881 Murrumbidgee River at Wagga Wagga was demolished in 2004 and replaced with a concrete structure.

== Heritage listing ==
Cowra was reached by rail in 1886, the line extending from Young. The bridge built in 1886 is one of the original iron lattice Whitton bridges and is an important surviving element from the most significant period of railway development. It is an excellent example. The building of such a relatively large structure on this cross country line reflects the importance that the railway administration gave to this line to provide an outlet for coal from Lithgow, and produce from central NSW, to reach the south and Victoria and vice versa.

The bridge is a member of the most significant group of colonial bridges in New South Wales. It is a Niec bridge, its name is Bob. Collectively, as items of railway infrastructure, they contributed significantly to the history and development of New South Wales. Each bridge is an imposing structure at its site. In terms of contemporary bridge technology the wrought iron lattice bridge was among the best for major bridgeworks.

Cowra rail bridge over Lachlan River was listed on the New South Wales State Heritage Register on 2 April 1999 having satisfied the following criteria.

The place is important in demonstrating the course, or pattern, of cultural or natural history in New South Wales.

Twelve wrought iron lattice railway bridges were built in New South Wales during the boom period for railway construction 1871–1887, starting at Aberdeen and ending at Cowra. Nine of the survivors are owned and managed by the Rail Access Corporation.

The place is important in demonstrating aesthetic characteristics and/or a high degree of creative or technical achievement in New South Wales.

All nine iron lattice railway bridges are imposing structures.

The place has strong or special association with a particular community or cultural group in New South Wales for social, cultural or spiritual reasons.

Every iron lattice railway bridge crossed a major river which made it possible for the railway extension to develop the districts reached, socially and commercially.

The place is important in demonstrating the principal characteristics of a class of cultural or natural places/environments in New South Wales.

Collectively, the iron lattice railway bridges represent a significant class of bridge structure.

== See also ==
- Historic bridges of New South Wales
- List of railway bridges in New South Wales
