= John Whitton Bridge =

Bridge in Sydney, Australia

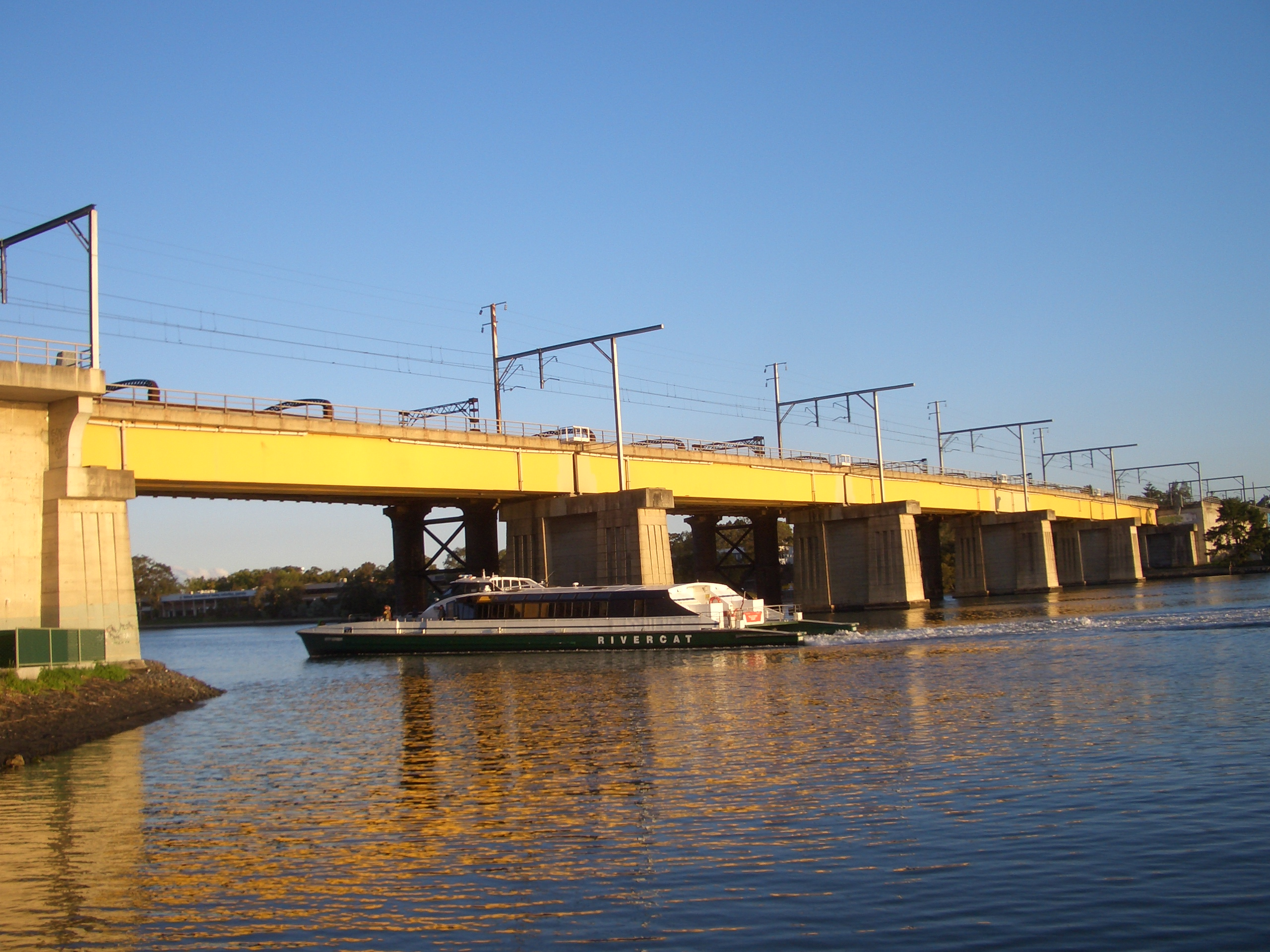
- John Whitton Bridge, looking south in September 2007
- Coordinates: 33°49′S 151°05′E
- Carries: Main Northern railway line
- Crosses: Parramatta River
- Locale: Meadowbank, New South Wales, Australia
- Begins: Meadowbank (north)
- Ends: Rhodes (south)
- Named for: John Whitton
- Owner: Transport Asset Manager of New South Wales
- Maintained by: Transport for NSW
- Followed by: Meadowbank Bridge (former rail bridge)

Characteristics
- Design: Box girder
- Material: Steel
- Pier construction: Concrete
- No. of spans: 5
- Piers in water: 4

Rail characteristics
- No. of tracks: 4
- Track gauge: 4 ft 8 1/2 in (1,435 mm) standard gauge

History
- Construction start: 1952
- Construction end: 1980
- Opened: May 1980
- Replaces: Meadowbank Bridge (former rail bridge)

Location
- Interactive map of John Whitton Bridge

The John Whitton Bridge is a railway bridge that carries the Main Northern railway line across the Parramatta River, located between the Sydney suburbs of Rhodes and Meadowbank.

== First bridge ==
The original double track Meadowbank Bridge opened on 17 September 1886 as part of the construction of the Main Northern railway line. It was a lattice truss bridge designed by John Whitton, the Chief Engineer of the New South Wales Government Railways. In 2000, the original bridge was refurbished and reopened for bike and pedestrian use.

== Second bridge ==
As part of plans to quadruple the Main North line, construction commenced on a new bridge to the west of the existing structure. The concrete piers were completed in 1952, before the project was cancelled. Work resumed in the 1970s, with a two-track box girder bridge opening in May 1980. The piers were extended to allow for a further two tracks to be built in the future. The new bridge was named after John Whitton.

== See also ==
- List of bridges in Sydney
- List of railway bridges in New South Wales
