= Old Como railway bridge =

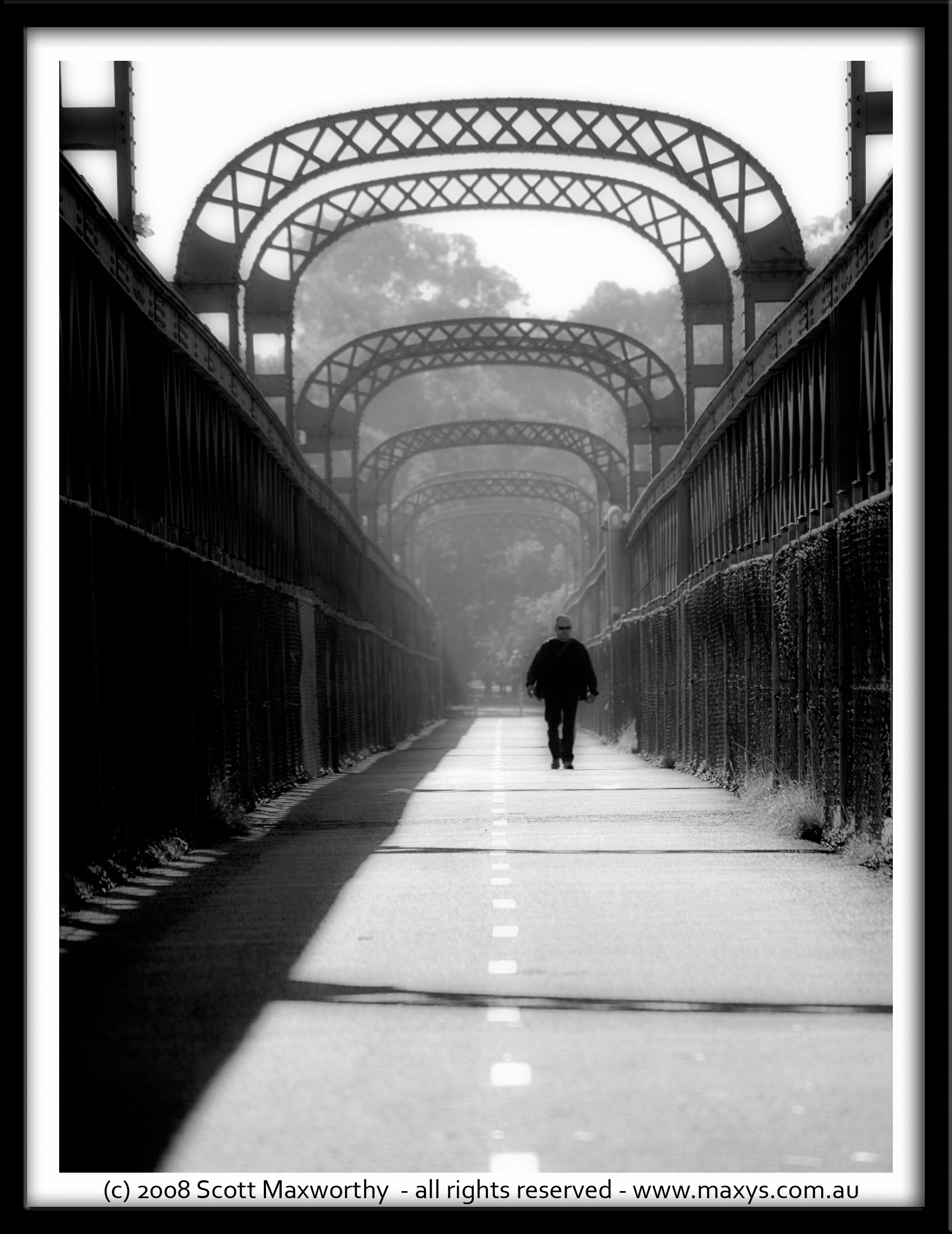
- Coordinates: 33°59′42″S 151°04′15″E
- Carries: Pedestrians; Bicycles; Water supply
- Crosses: Georges River
- Locale: Oatley, Georges River Council, New South Wales, Australia and Como, Sutherland Shire Council, New South Wales, Australia
- Owner: Sydney Water
- Preceded by: Woronora River Bridge
- Followed by: Como railway bridge

History
- Designer: John Whitton
- Contracted lead designer: Department of Railways
- Construction start: 1883
- Construction end: 1885
- Replaced by: Como railway bridge

New South Wales Heritage Register
- Official name: Como Rail Bridge; Old Como Rail Bridge
- Type: State heritage (built)
- Designated: 15 November 2002
- Reference no.: 1624
- Type: Railway Bridge / Viaduct
- Category: Transport – Rail
- Builders: C. and E. Millar

Location
- Interactive map of Old Como railway bridge

The Old Como railway bridge is a heritage-listed former railway bridge and now footbridge and water main carrier over the Georges River between Como and Oatley in the Sutherland Shire Council and Georges River Council local government areas of New South Wales, Australia. It was designed by John Whitton and Dept of Railways and built from 1883 to 1885 by C. and E. Millar. The property is owned by Sydney Water, an agency of the Government of New South Wales. It was added to the New South Wales State Heritage Register on 15 November 2002.

== History ==
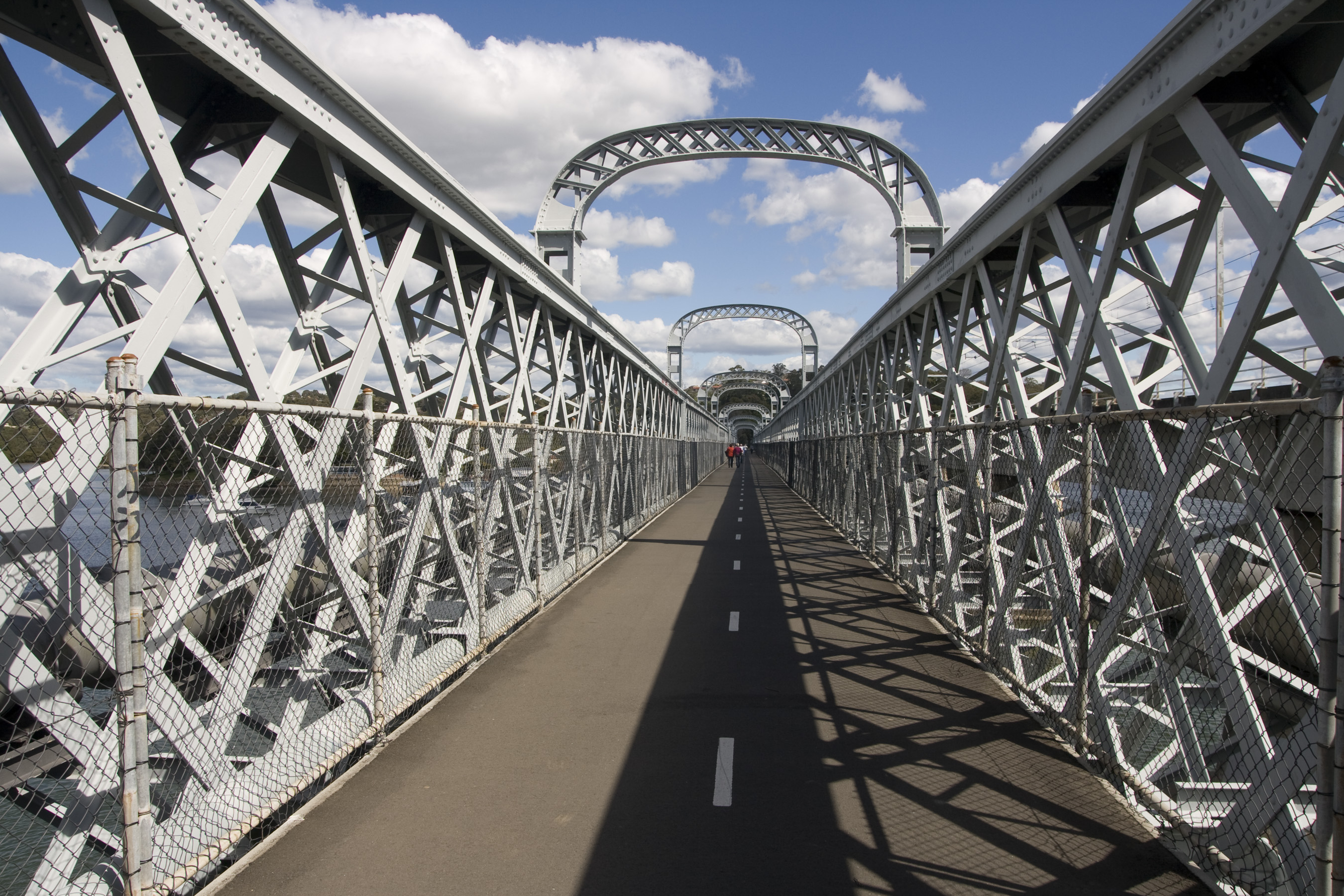
Old Como railway bridge now used as pedestrian bridge

=== Bridge ===
The Old Como railway bridge was completed in 1885 as a part of the original Illawarra railway line infrastructure. It is a very fine example of a single track steel lattice girder bridge of the 1870s and 1880s. Como is the longest single track steel lattice girder bridge in NSW and the only such bridge within 250 kilometres (160 mi) of Sydney. It was a notorious bottleneck within five years of its completion when the single track on either side of the bridge was increased to a double track. The double tracks converged to a single "gauntlet track" on the bridge, which enabled trains to cross in either direction without chain points and with a relative degree of safety. It was one of only a few installations of this type in NSW.

=== Sydney Water ===
Between 1935 and 1942, the Metropolitan Water Sewerage and Drainage Board built a new 1,220-millimetre (48 in) diameter pipeline to pump water from the recently completed Woronora Dam to the Board's reservoirs at Penshurst. The pipeline was carried over the Georges River on the Como railway bridge, supported on new steel outriggers cantilevered from the main girders. To maintain an evenly balanced load, the 1,220-millimetre (48 in) pipeline was split into two 600-millimetre (24 in) diameter mains, one supported on each side of the bridge.

The old Como railway bridge was finally superseded in 1972 by a new double track reinforced concrete bridge, built alongside the existing bridge. Responsibility for the old bridge was transferred to the Metropolitan Water Sewerage and Drainage Board, now Sydney Water. Sutherland and Georges River Councils, the local authorities on either side of the river, shared the cost of converting the railway track to an extensively used cycleway and footpath, which opened in 1985, 100 years after the construction of the bridge.

In the late 1990s, Sydney Water undertook upgrading works to the pipeline and maintenance gantries to repair leaks and comply with current OH & S requirements.

== Description ==
An iron lattice girder bridge. Formerly a rail bridge. Sydney Water has had a sewerage pipeline running across the bridge for many years. The railway infrastructure has been removed from the deck and the bridge deck is used as a pedestrian bridge over the Georges River.

Rail infrastructure removed from the bridge deck and replaced with bitumen footway.

=== Modifications and dates ===
- 1926 – Transverse elliptical arch braces raised to support electrical catenary
- 1935–1942 – Woronora to Penshurst 48 inch water main installed across bridge
- 1985 – Removal of rail infrastructure and conversion to footbridge/cycleway
- 2003 – Removal of timber walkway planks adjacent to the pipeline and the steel handrails.

== Heritage listing ==
As of November 2018, the Como Rail bridge is significant as the longest single track lattice girder bridge in New South Wales and is a rare example of this type. Historically, the bridge contributed to the opening up of the southern suburbs of Sydney in the 1880s. While the rail infrastructure has largely been removed from the bridge, it continues to serve an important function, supporting the Woronora to Penshurst Water Supply Pipeline, part of Sydney's fifth water supply system. It also provides an important pedestrian link across the Georges River.

The Old Como railway bridge was listed on the New South Wales State Heritage Register on 15 November 2002 having satisfied the following criteria.

The place is important in demonstrating the course, or pattern, of cultural or natural history in New South Wales.

The Old Como railway bridge is one of Whitton's 12 original lattice wrought iron girder bridges and is of high significance and visibility in the surrounding area. It is a major structure in the area and indicates clearly the level of design and technology involved in early railway construction to cross a major river.

Heritage NSW describes the bridge as "a very fine example of a single track steel lattice girder bridge of the 1870s and 1880s" stating that "Como is the longest single track steel lattice girder bridge in NSW and the only such bridge within 250 kilometres (160 mi) of Sydney."

The place is important in demonstrating aesthetic characteristics and/or a high degree of creative or technical achievement in New South Wales.

The bridge is the older of two important man-made elements in a scenic estuarine landscape, contrasting with the strong natural quality of the environs. The simple, rugged quality of the engineering contrasts with the Australian bush, cliff and shore settings.

The place has a strong or special association with a particular community or cultural group in New South Wales for social, cultural or spiritual reasons.

The bridge was a part of a major transport link between the South Coast and Sydney, encouraging development in the towns and suburbs which emerged along the railway line. The presence of the railway line encouraged Sydney day-trippers to use the Como boatsheds, baths, fishing locations and the adjacent National Park. The bridge continues in service as an important pedestrian and bicycle link across the Georges River.

The place possesses uncommon, rare or endangered aspects of the cultural or natural history of New South Wales.

The bridge is the only rail bridge of this style within 250 kilometres (160 mi) of Sydney and was one of a group of twelve constructed in the 1880s. The survival status of the remaining 11 bridges has not been investigated.

== See also ==
- List of railway bridges in New South Wales
- List of pedestrian bridges in Australia
