= John Whitton =

Anglo–Australian railway engineer (1820–1898)

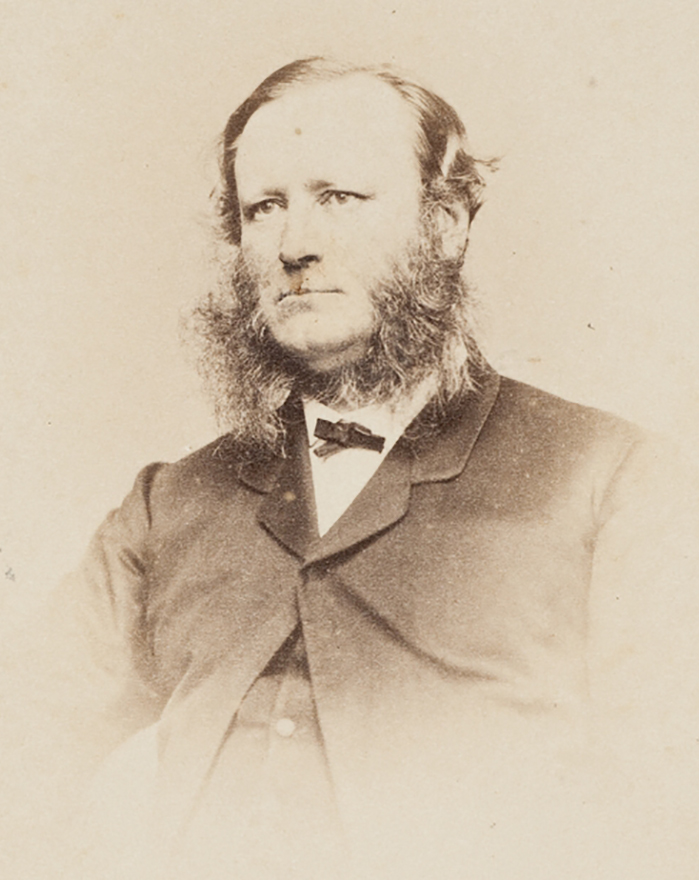
- John Whitton, 1867-1870, by Sydney & Melbourne Photographic Company
- Born: 1820 near Wakefield, Yorkshire, England
- Died: 20 February 1898; Mittagong, New South Wales, Australia
- Burial place: St Thomas Rest Park
- Occupation: Civil engineer
- Known for: Australian and English railway engineering
- Spouse: Elizabeth née Fowler (m. 1856)

John Whitton (1820 near Wakefield, Yorkshire, England – 20 February 1898) was an Anglo–Australian railway engineer, who was the Engineer-in-Charge for the New South Wales Government Railways, serving between 1856 and 1890, considered the Father of New South Wales Railways. Under his supervision, it is estimated that 2,171 miles (3,494 km) of railway around New South Wales and Victoria were completed. Whitton was responsible for the construction of parts of the Main Western railway line, in particular the section over the Blue Mountains and the Lithgow Zig Zag, and much of the Main Southern railway line.

== Biography ==
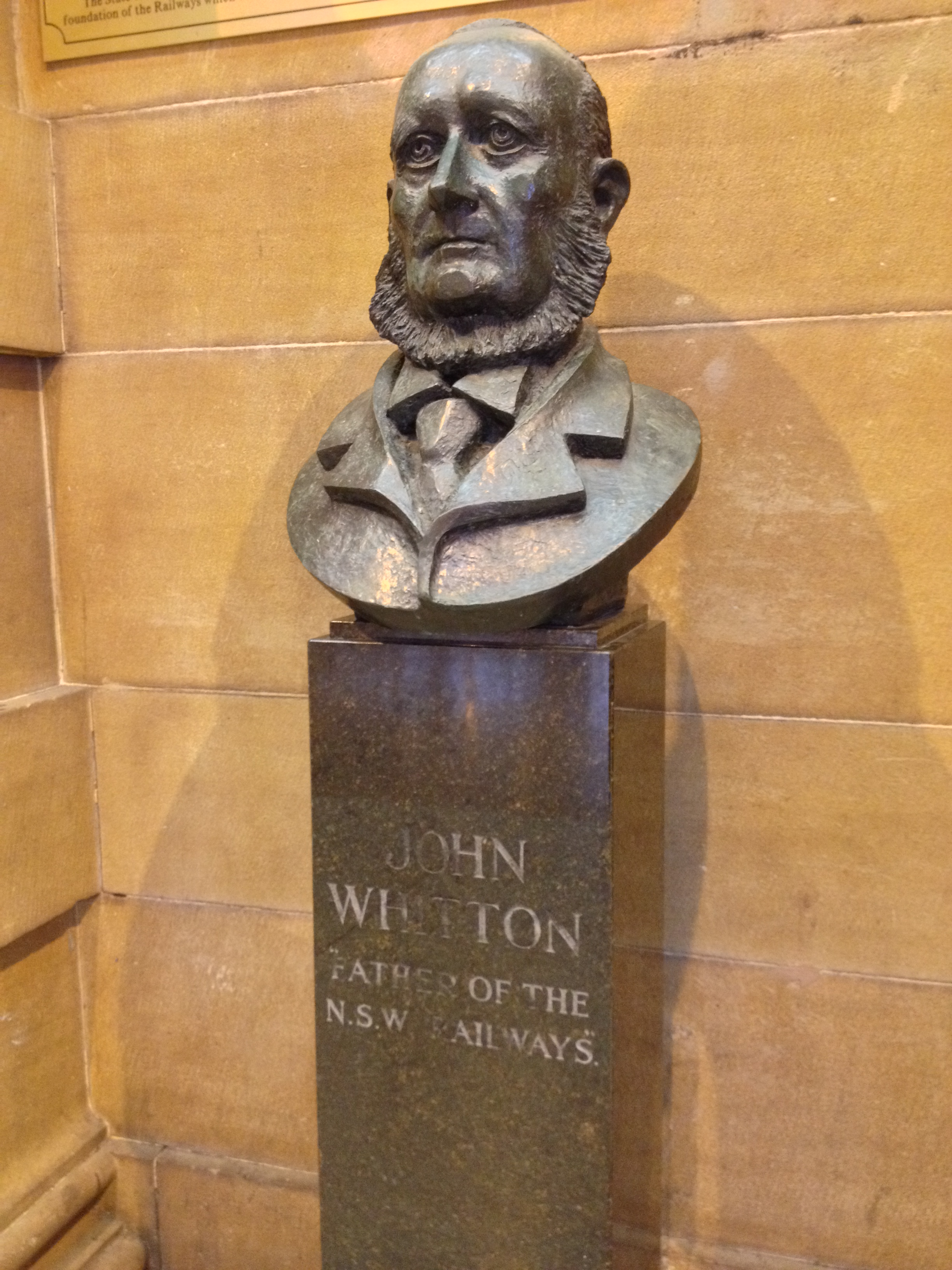
John Whitton bust at Central station

Indentured in England, Whitton gained extensive railway engineering experience prior to his arrival in the Colony of New South Wales in 1856. He was an engineer for the Manchester, Sheffield and Lincoln railway line (1847), and supervised the building of the Oxford, Worcester and Wolverhampton line from 1852 to 1856.

Appointed in March 1856 as Engineer-in-Charge, Whitton arrived in Sydney and found the Colony with 23 miles (37 km) of 4 ft 8 1/2 in (1,435 mm) standard gauge railway, four locomotives, 12 passenger carriages and 40 trucks. An advocate of the 5 ft 3 in (1,600 mm) broad gauge adopted by the South Australian and Victorian Railways, Whitton set about extending the railway into the city and resisted pushes for 4,000 miles (6,400 km) of cheaper, light tramways, such as horse-drawn lines with wooden rails, proposed by Governor William Denison. Whitton strongly opposed the government's uncritical acceptance of the lowest tenders for railway construction.

Whitton did, however, introduce cheaper so-called pioneer lines for use in easier terrain once the mountains had been crossed. Money was saved by building for lower speeds and the lightest of axleloads, with ash ballast, no fencing, etc. These pioneer lines retained the same gauge as the main system.

Whitton was accused of fraud, along with his brother-in-law, Sir John Fowler, and the charges were proved groundless. Following a select committee on railway extension that recommended the construction of cheap narrow-gauge railways, necessitating a break of gauge within the Colony, as well as at the border; estimates were prepared but Whitton, determined to sabotage the committee's recommendation, suspended all surveys and new work. Whitton overcame the engineering problems and in 1876 completed the Blue Mountains line that included two zigzags. In 1880-85 the unprecedented growth in railways, 1,000 miles (1,600 km) of new track and nine million more passengers exposed existing inadequacies in administration of railways. A royal commission into railway bridges exonerated Whitton of the charges of faulty design and of using inferior materials. In 1888 Henry Parkes's Government Railways Act reorganized the department and made Whitton's position easier.

In 1886 and 1887 Whitton submitted drawings for a proposed suspension bridge across Sydney Harbour from Dawes Point Battery to Milson's Point. On 1 May 1889 the Hawkesbury River Railway Bridge was opened; it was the final link in the railway system from Brisbane through Sydney to Melbourne and Adelaide and Whitton had fought for adequate finance for it.

However, by the end of his long tenure as Engineer-in-Chief, the British wrought-iron lattice truss bridge designs that Whitton employed had been superseded by lighter steel truss designs, following more modern American practice. The first Hawkesbury Railway Bridge was the first major rail bridge for which he had not specified the design. Whitton's successors would use steel truss designs for the other bridges built after he retired.

He was a member of the Hunter River floods commission 1869–70, the Sydney, City and Suburban Sewage and Health Board 1875–77, and the Board for Opening Tenders for Public Works 1875–87; he was a New South Wales commissioner for the Melbourne International Exhibition in 1880. Granted a year's leave on 29 May 1889, Whitton retired on 31 May 1890 with a pension of £675 and visited England in 1892. He had supervised the laying of 2,171 miles (3,494 km) of the track on which no accident had occurred attributable to defective design or construction. Parkes regarded him as 'a man of such rigid and unswerving integrity, a man of such vast grasp, that however, his faults may occasionally project themselves into prominence, it would be difficult to replace him by a man of equal qualifications'.

In international references, Whitton is recognised as one of approximately twenty of the greatest railway civil engineers in the first century of world railway construction.

Whitton was survived by his wife, one son and two daughters, he died of cardiac disease on 20 February 1898 at Mittagong, and was buried in the cemetery of St Thomas' Anglican Church, North Sydney. His estate was valued for probate at £10,396.

== Significant completed works ==
Whitton's works in both New South Wales and Victoria are extensive and include railway stations, railway bridges, viaducts, railway yards, and other infrastructure where he has designed projects and/or they have completed under supervision. 25 items of his work are listed on the NSW Heritage Register as significant under the Heritage Act, 1977 (NSW). An additional 37 other works are listed as significant in various local government areas.

=== Listed on the New South Wales State Heritage Register ===
==== Railway bridges, viaducts and other infrastructure ====
Bridge / viaduct / infrastructure name	Use(s)	Year completed	Image
Albury-Wodonga Railway Bridge over the Murray River	Main Southern railway line	1884	
Bathurst rail bridge over the Macquarie River	Main Western railway line	1876	
Bowenfels rail viaducts	Main Western railway line	1870^{a}	
Bredbo River railway bridge	Bombala railway line	1889	
Civic Railway Workshops, Newcastle	Main Northern railway line	1886	
Como railway bridge, Oatley over the Georges River	Footbridge & sewer main carriage^{b}	1885	
Cowra rail bridge over the Lachlan River	Blayney–Demondrille railway line	1887	
Dubbo rail bridge over the Macquarie River	Main Western railway line	1884	
Dundee rail bridge over the Severn River	Main Northern railway line	1886	
Lithgow Underbridge	Main Western railway line	1869	
Lithgow Zig Zag	Main Western railway line	1869	
Menangle rail viaduct over the Nepean River	Main Southern railway line	1863	
Michelago rail bridge over the Ingalara Creek	Bombala railway line	1889	
Narrandera rail bridge over the Murrumbidgee River	Hay railway line	1884	
Picton railway viaduct over Stonequarry Creek	Main Southern railway line	1867	
Sunnyside rail bridge over Tenterfield Creek	Main Northern railway line	1888	
Tamworth rail bridge over the Peel River	Main Northern railway line / Barraba railway line	1882	
Woolbrook rail bridge over the Macdonald River	Main Northern railway line	1882	
Yarraford rail bridge over Beardy Waters, near Glen Innes	Main Northern railway line	1886	

^aA sandstone viaduct built for the original single track line over Farmers Creek. A second viaduct was completed in 1921 after Whitton retired.
^bUses as a railway bridge on the Illawarra railway line until 1972.

==== Railway stations ====
Railway station	Railway line(s)	Year completed	Image
Albury	Main Southern railway line	1881	
Bathurst	Main Western railway line	1876	
Eskbank^{a}	Main Western railway line	1882	
Gundagi	Tumut and Kunama railway lines	1886	
Jerilderie	Tocumwal railway line	1885	
Mudgee	Gwabegar railway line	1884	
Newcastle	Newcastle railway line	1880	
Petersham^{b}	Main Suburban railway line	1885	
Redfern	Main Suburban railway line	1884	

^aNow disused as a railway station.
^bThe heritage listed Victorian Italianate station in Terminus Street, Petersham on the north side of the railway line, no longer serves as the main railway station.

=== Listed by local government areas ===
==== Railway bridges, viaducts and other infrastructure ====
Bridge / viaduct / infrastructure name	Use(s)	Year completed	Image
Erskineville (Macdonald St) Underbridge	Illawarra railway line	1884	
Erskineville (Victoria St) Underbridge	Illawarra railway line	1884	
Gatekeeper's Cottage, Medlow Bath	Main Western railway line	1867	
Knapsack Viaduct, Lapstone	Main Western railway line	1865	
Lapstone Zig Zag	Walking track and Skarratt Park^{a}	1867	
Lithgow (James St) Underbridge	Main Western railway line	1869	
Marrangaroo stone viaduct over the Middle River	Main Western railway line	c. 1870	
Munna underbridge over the Cudgegong River, near Gulgong	Gwabegar railway line	c. 1882	
Sandy Flat underbridge over the Bluff River	Main Northern railway (closed section)	1886	
Unanderra Station Master's residence	Illawarra railway line	1887	
Victoria Bridge over the Nepean River, Penrith	Road and pedestrian use^{b}	1867	
Wallerawang underbridge over the Coxs River	Main Western railway line	1870	
Woy Woy railway tunnel	Main Northern railway line	1888	

^aFormerly the bottom road of the zig zag on the Main Western railway, the Glenbrook Tunnel Deviation led to the 1892 closure of the Lapstone Zig Zag.
^bThe Victoria Bridge was converted from supporting the Main Western railway to road and pedestrian use in 1907.

==== Railway stations ====
Railway station	Railway line(s)	Year completed	Image
Bungendore railway station	Bombala railway line	1885	
Capertee railway station	Gwabegar railway line	1882	
Coolamon railway station	Hay railway line	1881	
Cooma railway station	Bombala railway line	1889	
Dubbo railway station	Main Western railway line	1881	
Greta railway station	Main Northern railway line	c. 1889	
Gunning railway station	Main Southern railway line	1875	
Millthorpe railway station	Main Western railway line	1886	
Mittagong railway station	Main Southern railway line	1870	
Moss Vale railway station	Main Southern railway line	1867	
Muswellbrook railway station	Main Northern railway line	1869	
Narrandera railway station	Hay railway line	1891	
Picton railway station	Main Southern railway line	1863	
Scone railway station	Main Northern railway line	1871	
Singleton railway station	Main Northern railway line	1863	
Uralla railway station	Main Northern railway line	1883	
Wagga Wagga railway station	Main Southern railway line	1879	
Werris Creek railway station	Main Northern railway line	1880	

== Legacy ==
The town of Whitton in Leeton Shire, where the Hay extension of the Great Southern Line reached in 1881, is named in honour. Whitton Park in Glenbrook and the May 1980 built John Whitton Bridge that carries the Main Northern line over the Parramatta River also bear his name. The bridge at Meadowbank stands next to an earlier iron lattice railway bridge that was constructed under his direction. A memorial dedicated to Whitton is located on the Lapstone Zig Zag walking trail and commemorates his substantial seven-span, sandstone Lapstone Knapsack Viaduct. A plaque bearing his contribution to New South Wales Railways was unveiled on 17 July 1985 at Central station, together with a bust on Chalmers Street, adjacent to the station.

In 2009 a rail activist group proposed the establishment of the Whitton Line, running from Port Macquarie to Albury via Narrabri, Dubbo, and Griffith.

== Gallery ==
Memorial plaque at Lapstone

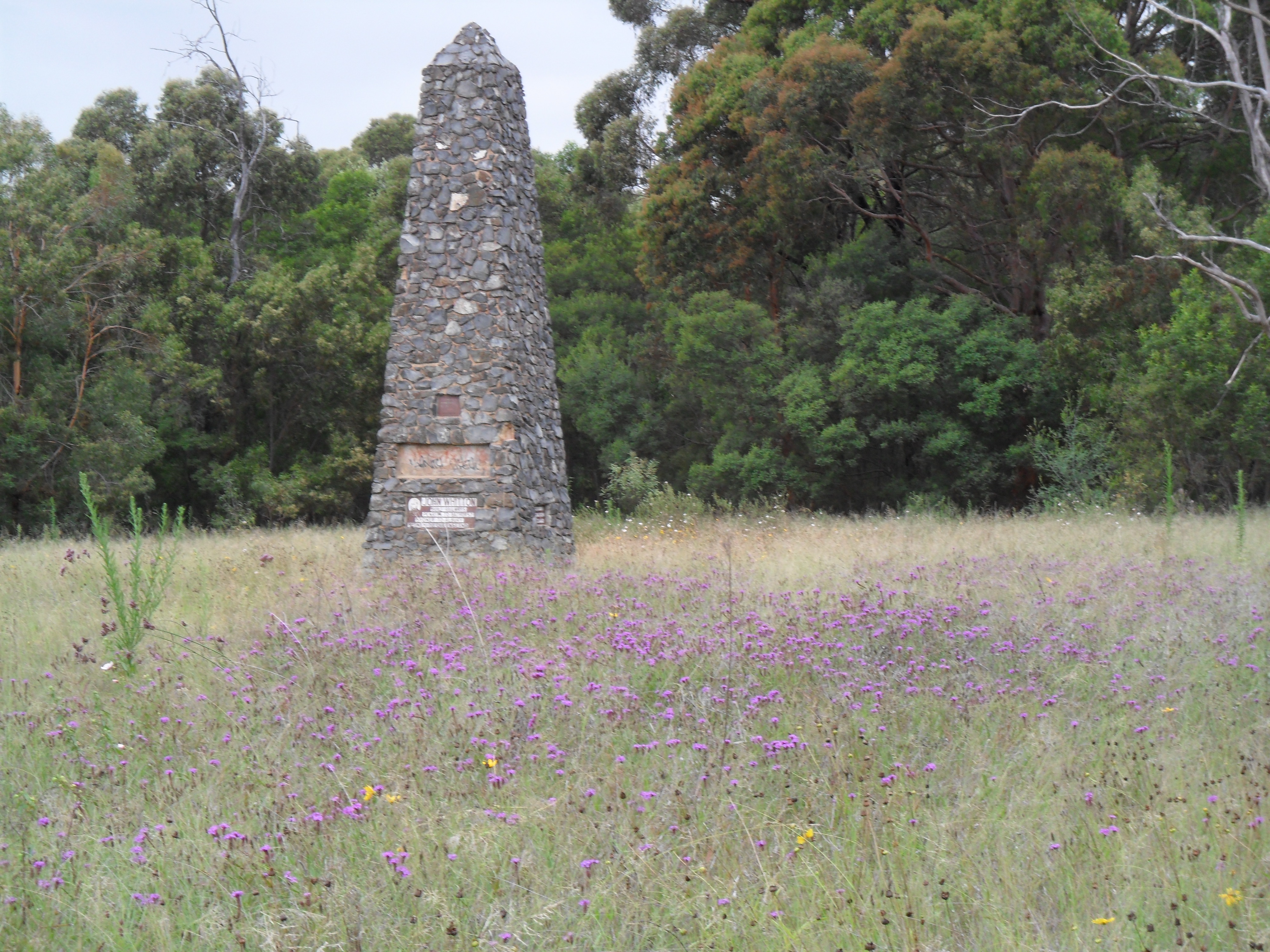
Memorial cairn between Emu Plains and Lapstone

== See also ==
- Works of John Whitton
