= Parramatta River railway bridge, Meadowbank =

Railway bridge in Sydney, New South Wales, Australia

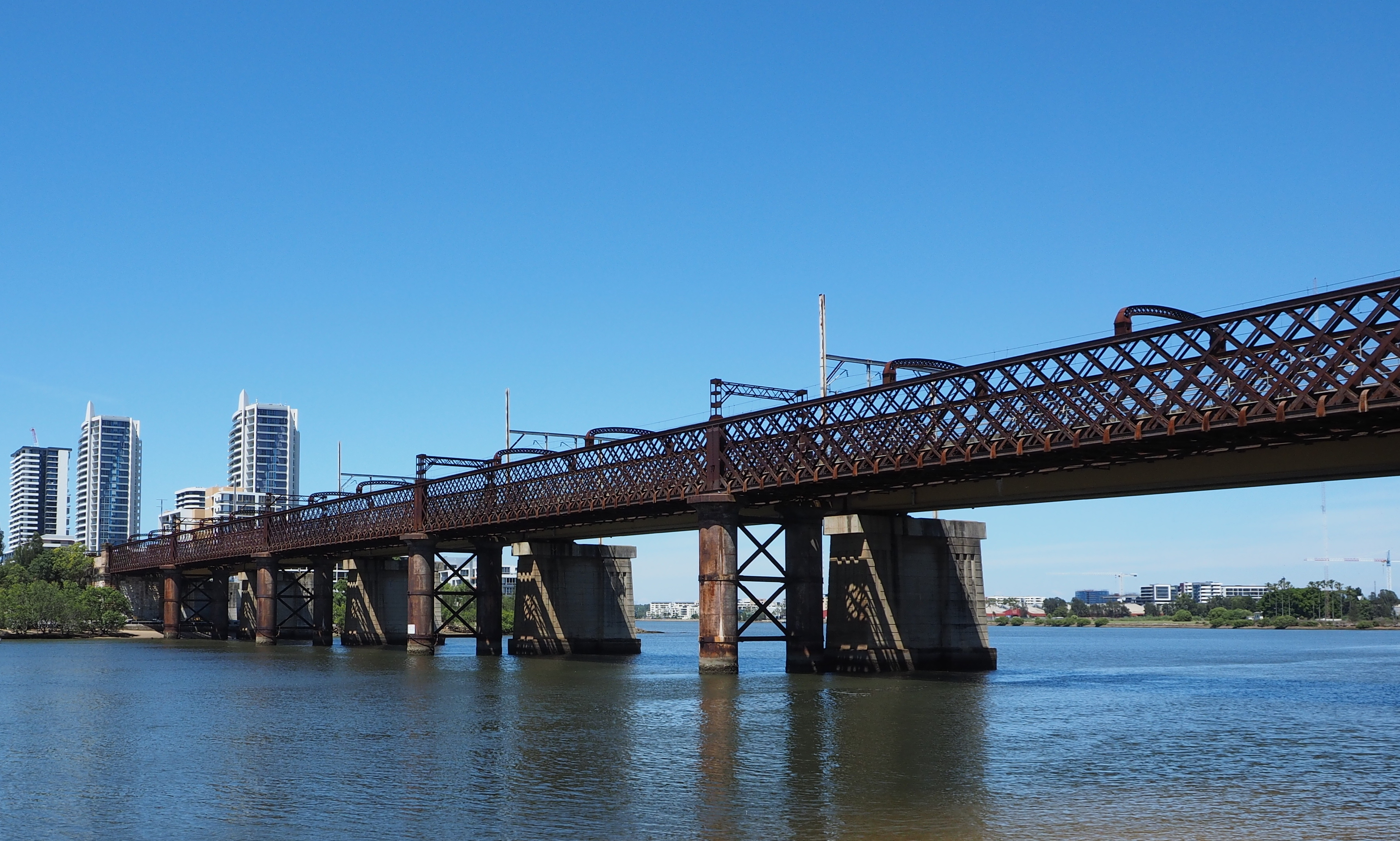
- Meadowbank Railway Bridge in 2014 with the John Whitton Bridge behind it

- Location within Sydney Location within Australia
- 33°49′19″S 151°05′20″E
- Location: Main Northern railway line, Meadowbank and Rhodes, Sydney, Australia

History
- Built: 1886
- Built for: New South Wales Government Railways

Site notes
- Architect: John Whitton
- Owner: Transport Asset Manager of New South Wales

New South Wales Heritage Register
- Official name: Meadowbank Rail Bridge over Parramatta River; John Whitton Bridge; Meadowbank Rhodes Railway Bridge
- Type: State heritage (built)
- Designated: 2 April 1999
- Reference no.: 1189
- Type: Railway Bridge/Viaduct
- Category: Transport – Rail

The Meadowbank Railway Bridge is a heritage-listed former railway bridge and now cycleway which carried the Main Northern line across the Parramatta River between the suburbs of Meadowbank and Rhodes in Sydney, New South Wales, Australia. It was designed by John Whitton and built in 1886. The bridge is also known as the Meadowbank Rail Bridge over Parramatta River, erroneously the John Whitton Bridge and the Meadowbank–Rhodes Railway Bridge. It is owned by the Transport Asset Manager of New South Wales.

== History ==
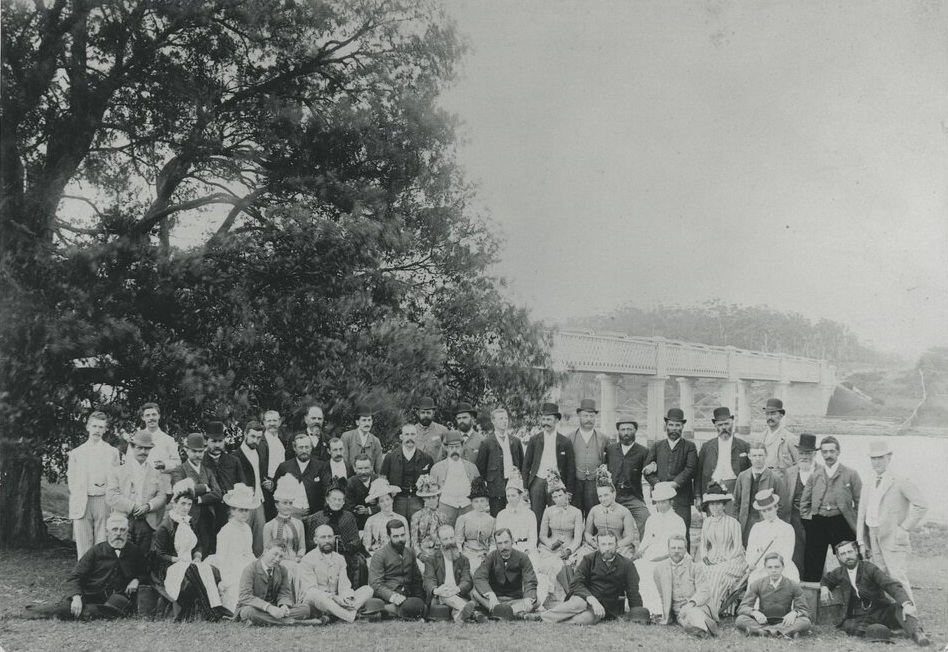
Members of the official party present at the official opening of the Meadowbank Railway Bridge on 17 September 1886.

The bridge was built in 1886, and officially opened on 17 September that year.

In 1980, a new parallel bridge, the John Whitton Bridge, was built to carry the train line and the historic bridge was taken out of use. After twenty years of disuse, it was converted to a pedestrian bridge and cycleway in the lead-up to the 2000 Summer Olympics.

In 2016, the local mayor and state opposition expressed concern about the deteriorating state of the bridge and called upon the state government to fund repairs and confirm their future plans for the bridge.

== Heritage listing ==
The bridge is one of twelve double lattice girder bridges that remain intact in the NSW railway system. As such it is evidence of a short lived approach to bridge design in which the spanning girders were reinforced by a lattice of bars, adjusted to suit changing structural forces. This bridge is the largest double track lattice girder bridge to be prefabricated in England for export to Australia and has significant variations on the standardised design. The bridge is considered one of the most architecturally impressive nineteenth century Australian railway structures. A unity in design, detail, skilful use of materials and fine workmanship is displayed by the bridge and its abutments. The Meadowbank-Rhodes bridge is widely regarded as an exceptional piece of early Australian railway engineering.

It was listed on the New South Wales State Heritage Register on 2 April 1999.

== Engineering heritage award ==
The bridge received a Historic Engineering Marker from Engineers Australia as part of its Engineering Heritage Recognition Program in 2001.

== See also ==
- Bike paths in Sydney
- Category:Railway bridges in New South Wales
