= Aberdeen, New South Wales =

Aberdeen
- Town
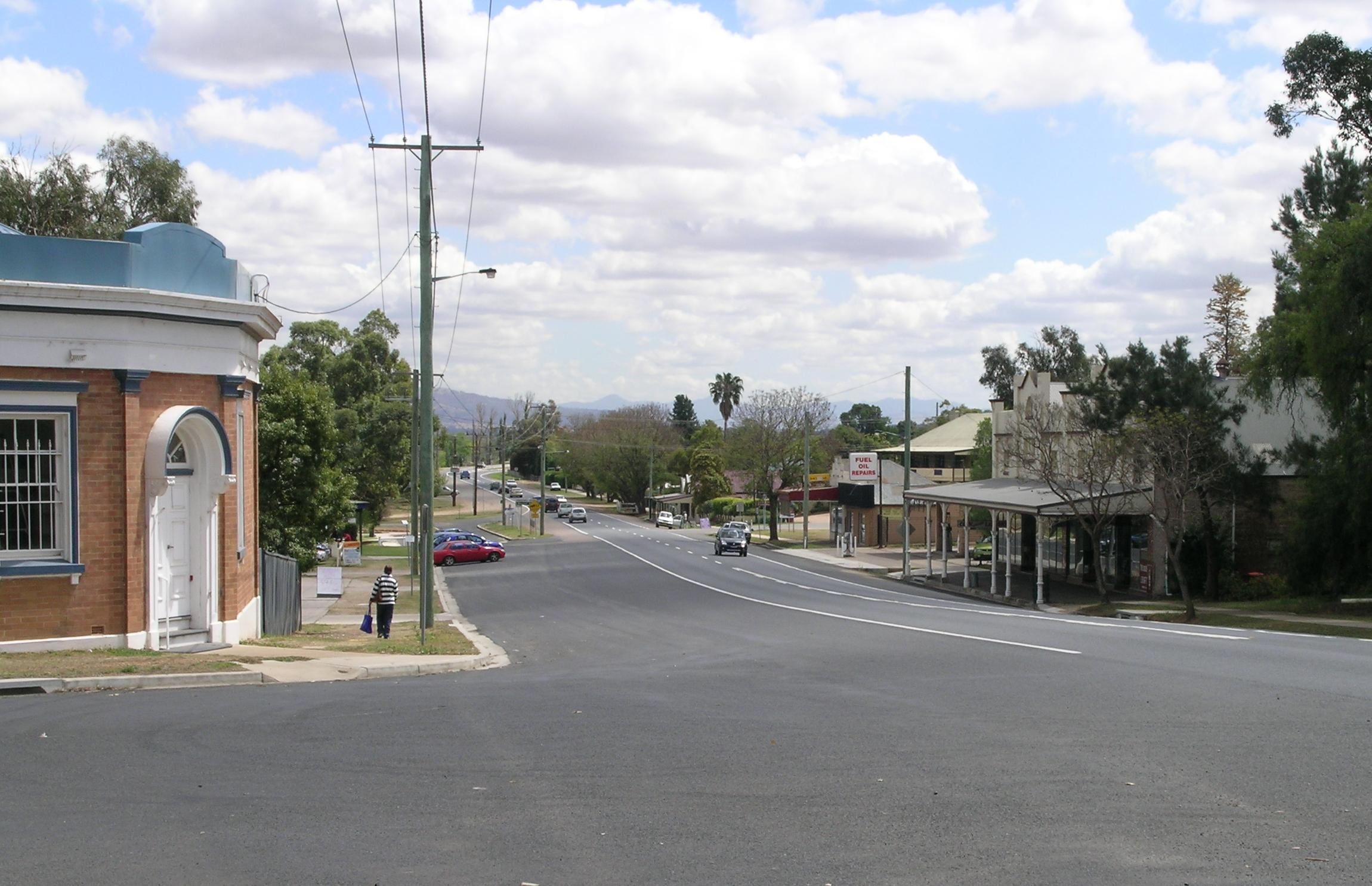
- New England Highway, Aberdeen

- Coordinates: 32°10′06″S 150°53′36″E
- Country: Australia
- State: New South Wales
- LGA: Upper Hunter Shire
- Location: 242 km (150 mi) N of Sydney; 139 km (86 mi) NW of Newcastle; 12 km (7.5 mi) N of Muswellbrook

Government
  - State electorate: Upper Hunter
  - Federal division: New England

Population
  - Total: 1,872 (2021 census)
- Postcode: 2336

Aberdeen is a small town in the upper Hunter Region of New South Wales, Australia, in Upper Hunter Shire. It is 12 kilometres north of Muswellbrook on the New England Highway.

== History ==
In 1828 Thomas Potter McQueen was granted 10,000 acres, and named the small township after George Hamilton-Gordon, 4th Earl of Aberdeen. In 1837 Segenhoe Inn was built, which Potter McQueen named after Segenhoe Manor, in Bedfordshire, where he was born in 1791. Aberdeen Post Office opened on 1 August 1856.

== Population ==
Historical population
Year	Pop.	±%
1921	730	—
1933	958	+31.2%
1947		—
1954	1,154	—
1961	1,056	−8.5%
1966	1,127	+6.7%
1971	1,118	−0.8%
1976	1,133	+1.3%
1981	1,410	+24.4%
1986	1,741	+23.5%
1991	1,797	+3.2%
1996	1,737	−3.3%
2001	1,708	−1.7%
2006	1,791	+4.9%
2011	1,837	+2.6%
2016	1,894	+3.1%
2021	1,872	−1.2%
Source: Australian Bureau of Statistics data.

According to the 2021 census of Population, there were 1,872 people in Aberdeen.

- Aboriginal and Torres Strait Islander people made up 10.6% of the population.
- 89.3% of people were born in Australia and 93.2% of people only spoke English at home.
- The most common responses for religion were Anglican 27.0%, Catholic 24.8% and No Religion 33.4%.

== Today ==
Aberdeen has its own pre-school, which was founded in 1977. The town contains two schools: the Aberdeen Public School, catering from kindergarten to Grade 6; and St. Joseph's High School, a Catholic co-educational high school catering for Grades 7 through to 12.

Aberdeen has two churches – St Thomas's Catholic Church, and St Mark's Anglican Church. It once had a third church, St Paul's Uniting Church, which has now been turned into an art gallery called the Artemis Gallery.

St Joseph's Aberdeen High School is located next to St Thomas's Catholic Church.

The town has a local rugby league team, the Aberdeen Tigers.

For travellers, there are two main areas for accommodation in the town: the Aberdeen Motel, which is on the southern edge of the town; and the Segenhoe Inn, which is situated towards the northern end of town. The Commercial Hotel is also available for budget accommodation.

== Transport ==
Aberdeen is on the Main North railway line, and is serviced by a daily Xplorer long-distance service in each direction between Sydney and Armidale, as well as two/three local services in each direction between Scone and Newcastle.

Osborn's Buses runs a bus service between Aberdeen, Scone and Muswellbrook. There are approximately 20 services per week in each direction.

== Abattoirs ==
Aberdeen is possibly best known for the former abattoirs in the town centre, which operated for well over 100 years, before the most recent owners - an American company called Conagra - decided to close down their New South Wales abattoirs and concentrate on their Queensland operations. One factor in closing down what was once a very important abattoir for Conagra, was that the financial cost of upgrading the Aberdeen Abattoir was deemed too high, thus the abattoir - which was the largest single employer in Aberdeen - was closed in 1999. Hundreds of people were left without work, and despite promises from both the New South Wales and Federal governments to encourage new businesses to open up in the area, beyond expansion of coal mining and associated industries, nothing of note eventuated.

== Notable people ==
- Katherine Knight (born 24 October 1955), murderer who killed her partner, skinned him and cooked his body parts
