= Woolbrook, New South Wales =

Woolbrook
- Town
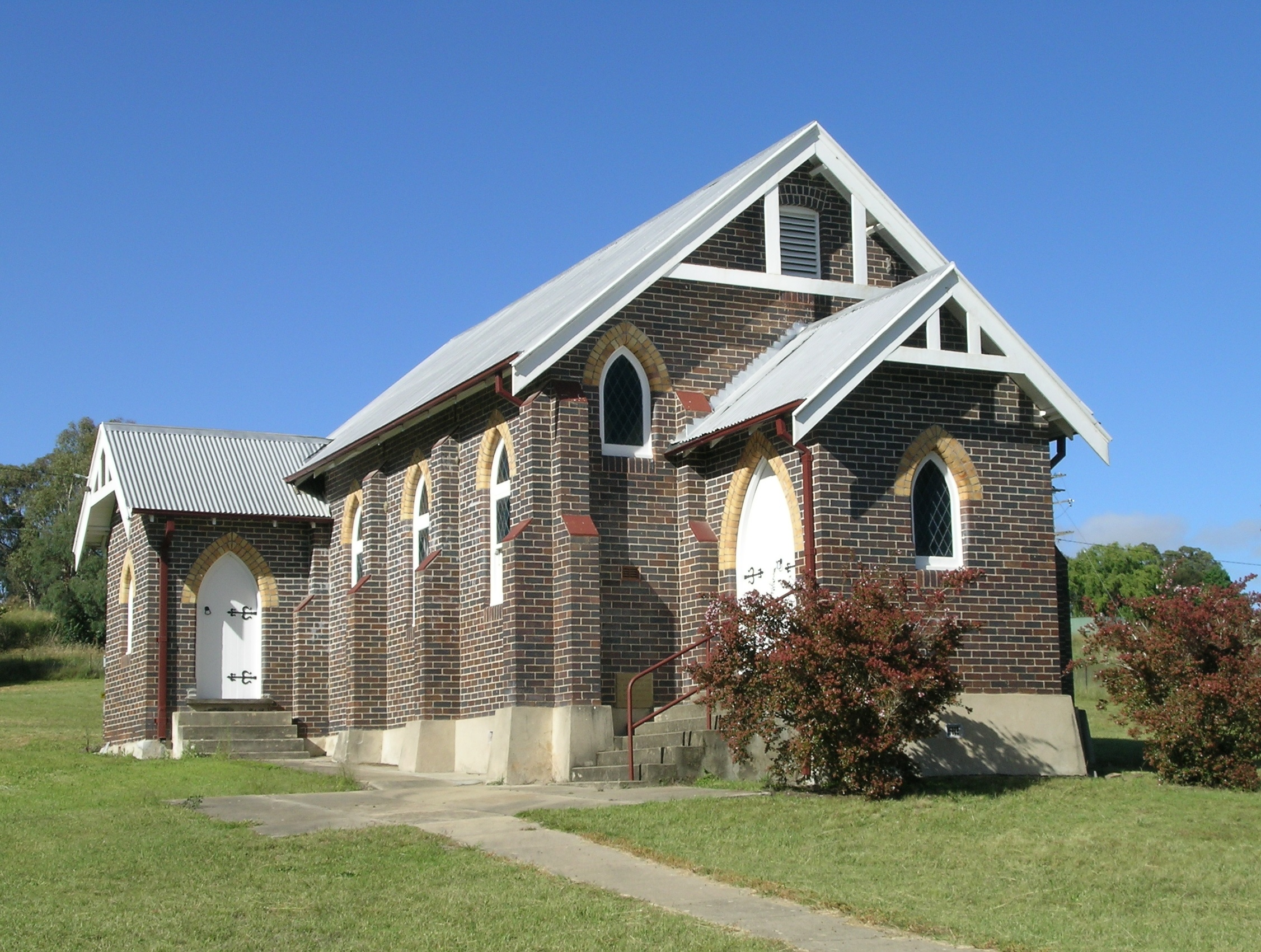
- St John's church

- Coordinates: 30°58′S 151°21′E
- Country: Australia
- State: New South Wales
- LGA: Walcha Shire, Tamworth Regional Council

Government
  - State electorate: Tamworth
  - Federal division: New England

Population
  - Total: 183 (2021 census)
- Postcode: 2354
- Mean max temp: 20.5 °C (68.9 °F)
- Mean min temp: 5.5 °C (41.9 °F)
- Annual rainfall: 784.2 mm (30.87 in)

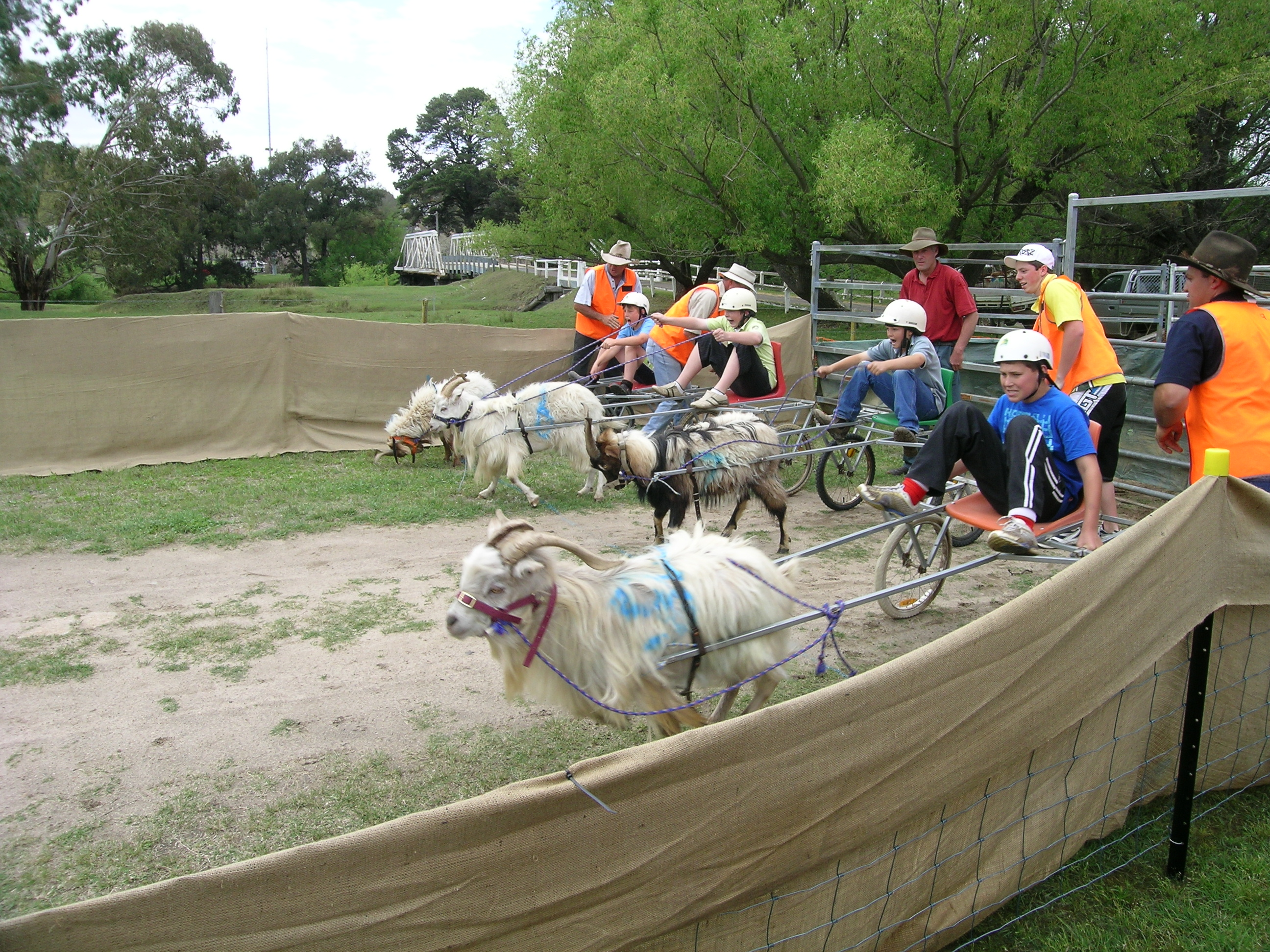
Juniors racing feral goats at Woolbrook, NSW

Woolbrook is a village in the New England region of New South Wales, Australia. The nearest town, Walcha is 29 km to the east of Woolbrook. At the 2021 census, Woolbrook had a population of 183.

The village straddles the Macdonald River which is in the headwater of the Namoi River. Woolbrook village is located in Tamworth Regional Council local government area, it is close to the Oxley Highway a few kilometres east of the junction between the Oxley Highway and the New England Highway. Other parts of the Woolbrook area are within the Walcha Shire local government area.

== History ==
In 1836 Robert Rodd settled on the land known as Surveyor's Creek Run an area of 40,000 acres (160 km^{2}) that then covered the area of the future villages of Woolbrook and Walcha Road. Amos Brothers erected the MacDonald River Private Hospital in 1879 to tend the men employed during the railway construction. The railway from Sydney to Woolbrook and onto Uralla was completed in 1882. Norm, Don and Geoff Goodwin, started the Goodwin Brothers sawmill there in c.1950. It was sold several times after Don died and finally closed in 2004. Macdonald River Post Office opened on 1 December 1889 and was renamed Woolbrook in 1891 and closed in 1990. A bakery was in operation at Woolbrook until around 1998.

A Weather Bureau site was opened in 1958 and is now monitored by the Watson family. Remaining is a public school with about 20 pupils, a store, the AIF Memorial Hall and St John's church which was built in 1929. The main industry in the area is sheep and beef cattle breeding. The population is now 220 persons, usually resident in the Woolbrook area.

On 28 and 29 November 2008, Woolbrook received torrential rain that caused severe flooding in the Macdonald River and led to the area being declared a natural disaster area.

Woolbrook hosts the annual Woolbrook Stampede each Easter. The horse sports include campdrafting, plus other sporting and novelty events. Woolbrook Spring Fair is held in October with draught horse events, goat racing, dog trials and other entertainment. The Macdonald River is a popular swimming and fishing spot and there are picnic facilities.

== Climate ==
Woolbrook has the typical cool to cold winter, mild to warm summer climate of the Northern Tablelands. Although due to the town's location in a deep valley, it records some of the coldest temperatures in the region, and sometimes even in the whole of Australia during the winter months. Woolbrook is fairly sunny, recording 118 clear days on a yearly basis. On 19 June 1994, a temperature of −14.5 °C (5.9 °F) was recorded in the town, the lowest temperature observed anywhere in Australia outside of the Australian Alps; along with −14.6 °C (5.7 °F) at Gudgenby in the ACT on 11 July 1971.

Climate data for Woolbrook Road (1991–2020 normals, extremes 1970–present); 925 m AMSL; 30.97° S, 151.35° E
Month	Jan	Feb	Mar	Apr	May	Jun	Jul	Aug	Sep	Oct	Nov	Dec	Year
Record high °C (°F)	38.7 (101.7)	38.0 (100.4)	34.5 (94.1)	30.6 (87.1)	24.0 (75.2)	21.0 (69.8)	20.5 (68.9)	26.5 (79.7)	29.0 (84.2)	33.0 (91.4)	36.5 (97.7)	38.0 (100.4)	38.7 (101.7)
Mean maximum °C (°F)	34.0 (93.2)	32.8 (91.0)	30.4 (86.7)	26.0 (78.8)	21.7 (71.1)	18.1 (64.6)	17.6 (63.7)	20.4 (68.7)	25.0 (77.0)	27.9 (82.2)	30.8 (87.4)	32.1 (89.8)	35.2 (95.4)
Mean daily maximum °C (°F)	28.2 (82.8)	27.0 (80.6)	24.9 (76.8)	21.5 (70.7)	16.9 (62.4)	13.6 (56.5)	13.0 (55.4)	14.8 (58.6)	18.3 (64.9)	21.6 (70.9)	24.1 (75.4)	26.2 (79.2)	20.8 (69.5)
Daily mean °C (°F)	20.6 (69.1)	19.9 (67.8)	17.6 (63.7)	13.6 (56.5)	9.4 (48.9)	7.1 (44.8)	6.1 (43.0)	7.0 (44.6)	10.2 (50.4)	13.5 (56.3)	16.5 (61.7)	18.7 (65.7)	13.4 (56.0)
Mean daily minimum °C (°F)	13.0 (55.4)	12.7 (54.9)	10.2 (50.4)	5.7 (42.3)	1.8 (35.2)	0.5 (32.9)	−0.9 (30.4)	−0.9 (30.4)	2.1 (35.8)	5.4 (41.7)	8.8 (47.8)	11.1 (52.0)	5.8 (42.4)
Mean minimum °C (°F)	6.2 (43.2)	6.1 (43.0)	2.1 (35.8)	−1.4 (29.5)	−6.2 (20.8)	−7.2 (19.0)	−7.8 (18.0)	−7.4 (18.7)	−4.6 (23.7)	−2.1 (28.2)	1.1 (34.0)	3.2 (37.8)	−8.7 (16.3)
Record low °C (°F)	−1.0 (30.2)	1.0 (33.8)	−4.0 (24.8)	−9.0 (15.8)	−10.5 (13.1)	−14.5 (5.9)	−13.5 (7.7)	−11.5 (11.3)	−10.0 (14.0)	−5.6 (21.9)	−4.0 (24.8)	−2.5 (27.5)	−14.5 (5.9)
Average rainfall mm (inches)	88.4 (3.48)	78.8 (3.10)	51.2 (2.02)	37.2 (1.46)	38.5 (1.52)	48.8 (1.92)	45.9 (1.81)	44.2 (1.74)	54.3 (2.14)	70.3 (2.77)	87.4 (3.44)	109.0 (4.29)	754 (29.69)
Average rainy days (≥ 1 mm)	7.9	7.3	6	3.9	5.3	6.9	6.5	5.7	6.4	7.2	8.8	10.1	82
Average afternoon relative humidity (%) (at 3 pm)	45	50	47	46	54	61	57	48	46	45	49	47	50
Average dew point °C (°F)	12.4 (54.3)	13.3 (55.9)	10.6 (51.1)	7.3 (45.1)	5.6 (42.1)	4.4 (39.9)	2.9 (37.2)	2.1 (35.8)	4.1 (39.4)	6.4 (43.5)	9.5 (49.1)	11.3 (52.3)	7.5 (45.5)
Source: Bureau of Meteorology (Dew point for 3pm)

== Notable people from Woolbrook ==
- Barnaby Joyce, an Australian politician, grew up at Woolbrook and attended the school there until he was 11.

== Heritage listings ==
The heritage-listed sites in Woolbrook are:

- Woolbrook rail bridge over Macdonald River

== Woolbrook railway station ==
Woolbrook station was opened on 2 August 1882 as Macdonald River. On 30 October 1891 it was renamed Woolbrook and closed at an unknown date in the late 1990s/2000s. The nearest current station is Walcha Road.

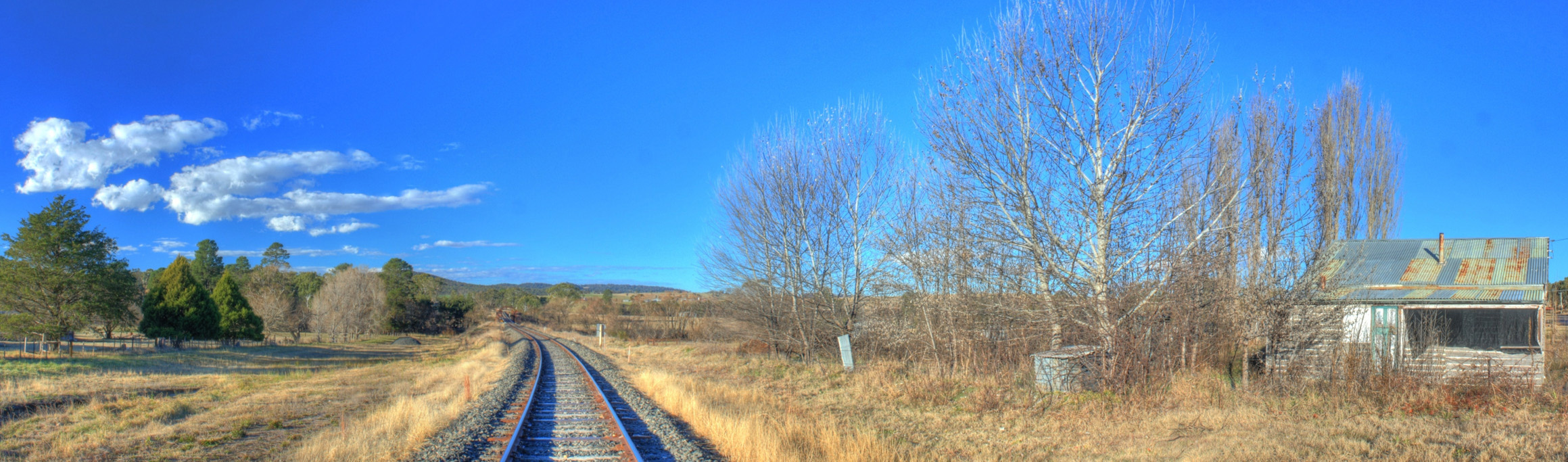
Woolbrook Railway facing Northbound from Campfire Road Crossing

Preceding station	Former services	Following station
Walcha Road towards Wallangarra	Main North Line	Danglemah towards Sydney
