= Macquarie River railway bridge, Bathurst =

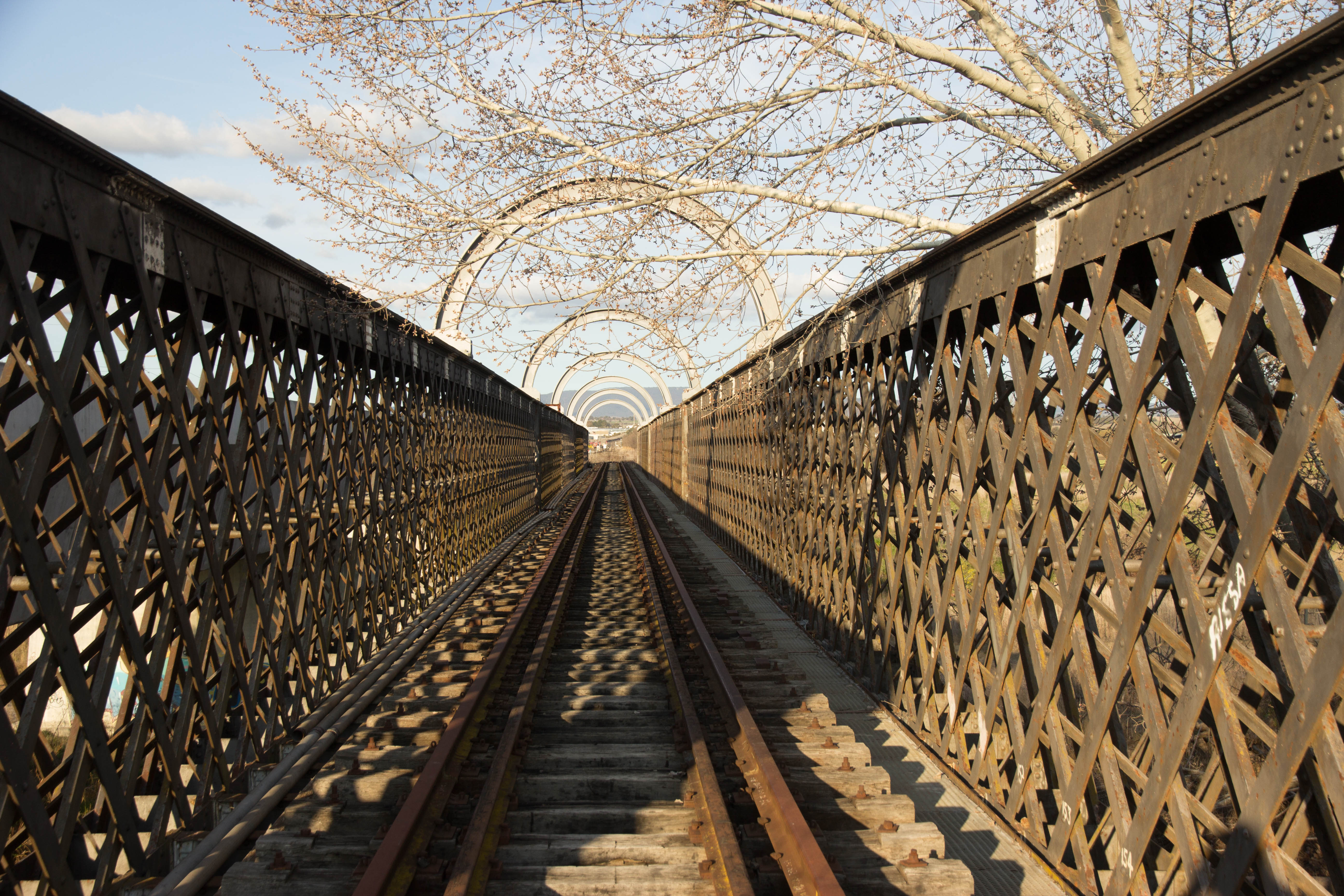
- The disused railway bridge, pictured in 2018
- Coordinates: 33°25′23″S 149°35′26″E
- Carries: Main Western Line (1876–c. 2005)
- Crosses: Macquarie River
- Locale: Bathurst, New South Wales, Australia
- Begins: Bathurst (west)
- Ends: Kelso (east)
- Owner: Transport Asset Manager of New South Wales

Characteristics
- Design: Lattice girder bridge
- Material: Wrought iron

Rail characteristics
- No. of tracks: One
- Track gauge: 4 ft 8 1/2 in (1,435 mm) standard gauge

History
- Designer: Sir John Fowler for John Whitton
- Constructed by: William Mason
- Fabrication by: Britannia Ironworks, Derby, England
- Construction end: 1876
- Opened: April 1976
- Closed: c. 2005
- Replaced by: Concrete girder bridge (c. 2005)

New South Wales Heritage Register
- Official name: Bathurst rail bridge over Macquarie River; Bathurst – Kelso Railway Bridge
- Type: State heritage (built)
- Designated: 2 April 1999
- Reference no.: 1025
- Type: Railway Bridge/Viaduct
- Category: Transport – Rail

Location
- Interactive map of Macquarie River railway bridge, Bathurst

The Macquarie River railway bridge is a heritage-listed disused railway bridge across the Macquarie River that was previously located on the Main Western line in Bathurst in the Bathurst Region local government area of New South Wales, Australia. It was built in 1876. It is also known as Bathurst Rail Bridge over Macquarie River and Bathurst – Kelso Railway Bridge. The property is owned by Transport Asset Manager of New South Wales, an agency of the Government of New South Wales. The bridge was added to the New South Wales State Heritage Register on 2 April 1999 and was added to the (now defunct) Register of the National Estate on 18 April 1989.

== History ==
The bridge opened with the extension of the railway line into Bathurst in April 1876. It was designed by John Whitton, with the ironwork by Messrs. Andrew Handyside & Co. of the Britannia Ironworks, Derby, imported from England by the contractor, William Mason.

The bridge is a significant technical accomplishment. Placed in service in 1876 it has three main lattice truss spans, each of 48.5 metres (159 ft). It is one of a series of twelve related bridges, all with 48.5-metre (159 ft) lattice trusses, built between 1871 and 1887. The bridge at Bathurst is the second of a series and is the oldest of the eleven that remain; the earlier 1871 Hunter Bridge at Aberdeen, with three 48.5-metre (159 ft) spans, no longer remains. The bridge is of considerable age and size for its type. It is the ninth oldest of existing Australian metal truss bridges. When completed in 1876, the only metal truss bridges of longer span were the South Esk River Rail Bridge at Longford (1871, 64 metres (210 ft), still existing) and the original Brisbane River Rail Bridge at Indooroopilly (1876, 48.8 metres (160 ft), destroyed by flood). The only metal truss bridges of greater total length were at Moorabool (1852, 396 metres (1,299 ft), replaced), the original bridge at Indooroopilly (as above, 207 metres (679 ft)), and the bridge at Aberdeen (1871, same spans as this bridge). The present bridge is therefore the longest remaining metal truss bridge of its age. The series of lattice truss bridges, of which this is the oldest surviving example, was designed by Sir John Fowler (co-designer of the World Heritage-listed Firth of Forth Bridge) for Whitton, and was one of the subjects of the 1884-86 Railway Bridges Enquiry, which finally approved their design.

== Description ==
The Macquarie River underbridge is made of wrought iron with lattice girder. The bridge carries a single 4 ft 8 1/2 in (1,435 mm) standard gauge railway with transomes on timber stringers on metal cross girders which frame into the sides of the lower chords. The main trusses are through type lattice trusses, continuous over three 48.5-metre (159 ft) spans. They are of constant depth with seven triangulations and are connected together above the track by characteristic arched latticed braces. They are supported on twin, cast iron cylinder piers. The superstructure was fabricated by Handyside and Company, Derby, England; the principal contractors were Cummings, Mason and Mason and Ellsington. The bridge was load tested on 8 March 1876 and placed in service on 4 April 1876.

In c. 1950s, work commenced on replacing the bridge but this was held up until 2008 when funding was approved via a concrete girder bridge that is located a few meters upriver of the heritage-listed bridge. Previous work was removed and adjusted to the new specifications and new construction completed.

== Heritage listing ==
This is one of John Whitton's major 1870s wrought iron bridges and is an excellent example of early bridge construction. The lattice girder is one of Whitton's original twelve bridges of that design and they represent the third stage of bridge construction in NSW following the stone viaduct and iron tubular bridges.

Bathurst rail bridge over Macquarie River was listed on the New South Wales State Heritage Register on 2 April 1999 having satisfied the following criteria.

The place possesses uncommon, rare or endangered aspects of the cultural or natural history of New South Wales.

This item is assessed as historically rare. This item is assessed as scientifically rare. This item is assessed as arch. rare. This item is assessed as socially rare.

== Gallery ==
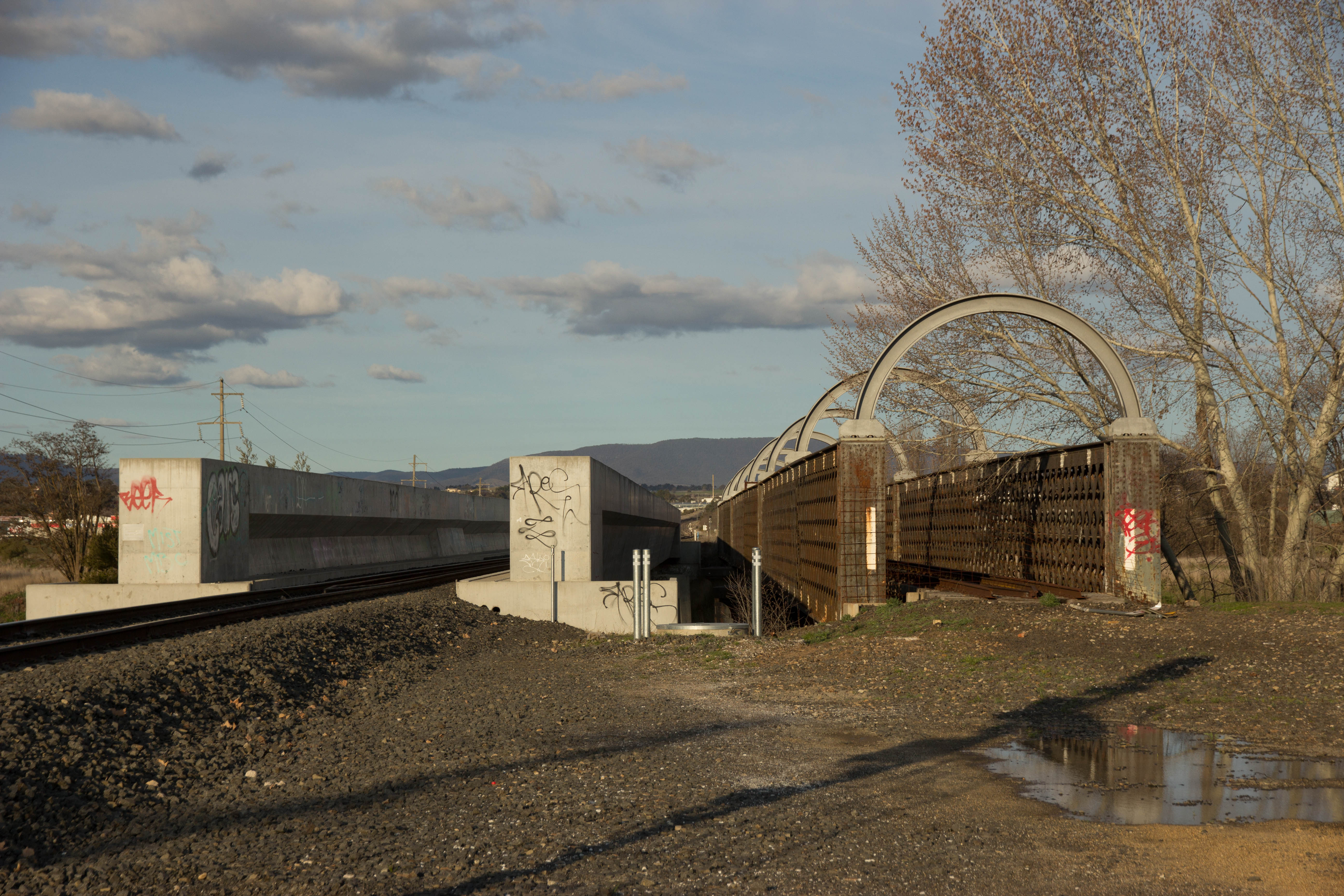
The heritage-listed bridge (right) and the replacement concrete girder bridge (left), looking east.

== See also ==
- List of railway bridges in New South Wales
