= Border Rivers =

Group of rivers and a region in Australia

The Border Rivers are a group of Australian rivers and the associated region near part of the state border between New South Wales and Queensland.

The rivers rise in the New England Tablelands bioregion and drain the western side of the Great Dividing Range as they collectively form part of the headwaters of the Darling River within the Murray-Darling basin. The eastern boundary of the Border Rivers catchment area extends along the Great Dividing Range divide from Stanthorpe in the north, to Guyra and Uralla, in the south. The western boundary of the region converges near the New South Wales town of Mungindi. Collectively, the Border Rivers comprise a catchment area of 45,675 kilometres (28,381 mi).

The Border Rivers flows through lands previously occupied by the Kamilaroi and Bigambul and other indigenous people. The Morella Watercourse, Boobera Lagoon, and Pungbougal Lagoon located on the Macintyre River floodplain is considered one of the most important Aboriginal places in eastern Australia. As one of the few permanent waterbodies in the northern Murray-Darling basin the complex provides refuge for wildlife during periods of drought. Sundown National Park also has ecological significance, hosting eleven rare and threatened animals, five rare or vulnerable plant species and permanent waterholes supporting a diverse range of waterbirds and aquatic biota.

As of 2012 the catchment supported a population of around 50,000 people. The main agricultural use of land is for grazing and dryland cropping, and this covers around ninety per cent of the catchment. Irrigation for the production of cotton occurs on the western plains between Goondiwindi and Mungindi.

== Branches ==
For approximately 450 to 470 kilometres (280 to 290 mi), the Border Rivers form the border between New South Wales and Queensland, located in New South Wales between Tenterfield at its most eastern point, to Mungindi at its most western point. Unhelpfully, several rivers have been given the same name to separate watercourses located in each state.

Queensland

Generally speaking the following rivers are considered to comprise part of the river group and region within Queensland:

- Severn River (Queensland), draining the Stanthorpe district, and flowing into New South Wales
- Pike Creek, including Glenlyon Dam, and flowing into New South Wales
- Macintyre Brook, draining the Inglewood district, and flowing into New South Wales, near Yelarbon
- Weir River, draining the Southern Downs district, and flowing into New South Wales, near Mungindi

New South Wales

The following rivers either mark the New South Wales boundary with Queensland, or are fully located within the state and are considered to comprise part of the river group and region:

- Mole River, draining the Bonshaw district
- Dumaresq River, receiving flows from the Severn River (Queensland), Pike Creek, and the Mole River
- Severn River (New South Wales), draining the Glen Innes district, including the Pindari Dam
- Macintyre River, receiving flows from the Severn River (New South Wales), and forming through the confluence of the Dumaresq River and Macintyre Brook. The Macintyre River variously flows in both New South Wales and Queensland

Within New South Wales, both the Macintyre and Weir rivers drain to become the Barwon River, a major tributary of the Darling River within the Murray-Darling basin.

The Dumaresq River forms the border between Queensland and New South Wales, generally south-east of Bonshaw and Boggabilla. The Macintyre River forms the border west of Boggabilla to Mungindi.

== Towns ==
The main activities in the Border Rivers region is agriculture. Crops are grown in areas with suitable conditions and the rest of the area is used for grazing. Because the rivers are quite small and erratic in flow, there is only small-scale irrigation.

The largest town in the western part of the Border Rivers region is Goondiwindi where the Newell Highway crosses the Macintyre River at the state border. The towns of Stanthorpe, in Queensland and Tenterfield, Glen Innes in New South Wales lie along the New England Highway on the eastern edges of the Border Rivers Basin. Inverell lies to the west on the western edge of the New England Tablelands. The central part of the Border Rivers region is rather underpopulated with no large towns, major transport routes, or significant industries other than agriculture. Small towns in the region include Texas, Inglewood, Ashford, Yetman, Bonshaw, Emmaville.

== See also ==
- List of rivers of New South Wales
- Rivers of Queensland
