= Customs House Museum =

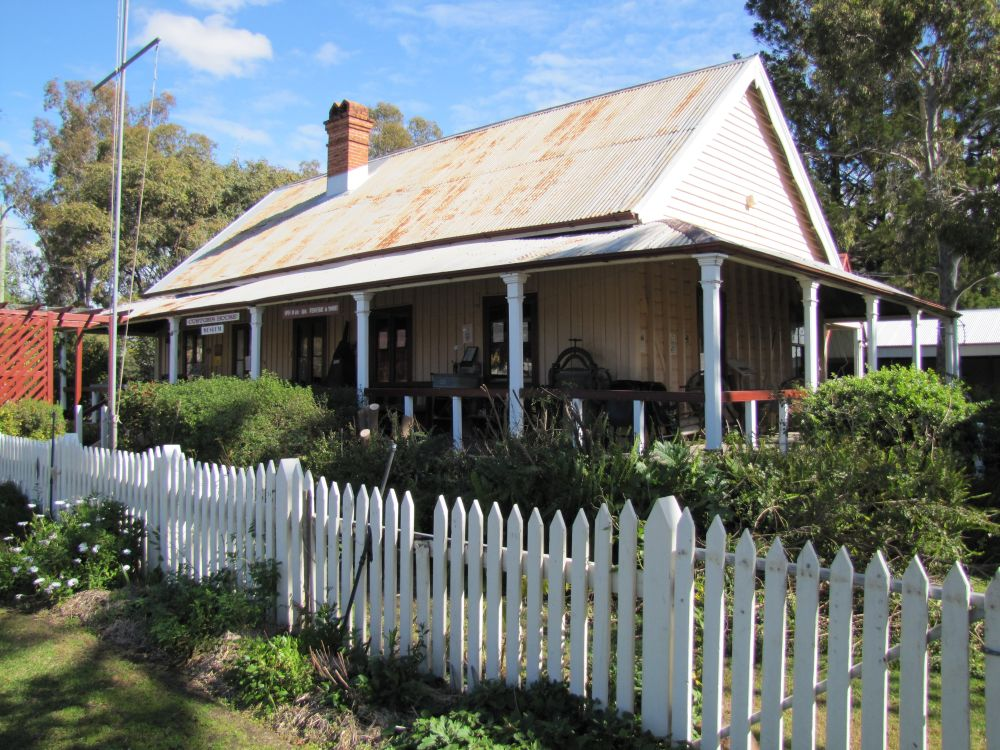
- Customs House Museum, 2012

- Location within Queensland
- 28.5489°S 150.3068°E
- Location: 1 McLean Street, Goondiwindi, Goondiwindi Region, Queensland, Australia

History
- Design period: 1840s–1860s (mid-19th century)
- Built: 1860s circa – 1900s circa

Queensland Heritage Register
- Official name: Customs House Museum
- Type: state heritage (built)
- Designated: 21 October 1992
- Reference no.: 600530
- Significant period: 1860s-1900s circa (fabric, historical)
- Significant components: residential accommodation – main house, kitchen/kitchen house, residential accommodation – housing

Customs House Museum is a heritage-listed former detached house and now museum at 1 McLean Street, Goondiwindi, Goondiwindi Region, Queensland, Australia. It was built from 1860s circa to 1900s circa. It was added to the Queensland Heritage Register on 21 October 1992.

== History ==
The Goondiwindi Customs House Museum is located on the town side of the main bridge crossing the Macintyre River at Goondiwindi. The town developed on the site of a teamsters' camp established where the boundaries of 3 pastoral properties met.

Allan Cunningham explored the area around Goondiwindi in 1827. In the 1830s pastoral settlement in New South Wales pushed northwards as graziers looked for new land and in the early 1840s sheep runs were established on the Darling Downs. Early stations were supplied from the south, rather than from Brisbane. Teamsters bringing supplies to the Goondiwindi area came from Maitland and they camped on a rise where the boundaries of Umbercollie, Callandoon and Old Goondiwindi stations met. This hill became the basis for a small settlement, which gradually came to include some permanent residents.

The initial site for government services was at Callandoon where a Native Police camp was established in 1849 and from 1859 there was a police station and a post office in operation utilising station buildings.

In 1858 the government was petitioned to commission a township survey so that land for settlement could be purchased at the site of the teamsters camp. A survey of the area in 1859 shows no buildings on the town area at that time. The first sale of land at Goondiwindi was held in August 1860 at which 50 residential blocks were sold. By this time Queensland had become a separate colony to New South Wales and the Macintyre River formed part of the border. In 1861 the postal service shifted to Goondiwindi and a courthouse and police station were built. Matthew Maher, a mail contractor, who also purchased several other lots, first purchased the land on which the Customs House Museum stands, in 1863. By 1868, Samuel Droughton was also working as a mail contractor based on Goondiwindi. In March 1872 he purchased the property from Maher. It remained in the ownership of Droughton, who also acted as a dairyman, and then that of his widow, until 1901 when it was sold to the editor of the local newspaper, Edward Drake.

In December 1859, Queensland was formally proclaimed as a new colony. In 1862 the New South Wales Border Customs Act no 22 was introduced to allow arrangements to be made "for establishing a mutual system of collecting and accounting for all Customs Duties payable upon goods crossing this boundary." At first, the flow of goods into Queensland through the inland routes was not sufficient in either quantity or value to warrant the cost of collecting customs duty in remote areas. However, as settlement increased, the Queensland Government began to feel concern at the amount of revenue that was being lost in this way. Not only did more goods travel north than went south into New South Wales, but duty on such everyday commodities as tea and tobacco was twice as high in Queensland and a considerable amount of smuggling across the border took place. Discussions between the colonies with a view to making adjustment payments were held but came to nothing.

In late 1870, the Queensland Government decided to establish a means of control so that an estimated revenue loss of £15,000 per year could be prevented. In December 1870 A Bill to Provide for the Collection of Customs Duties on Goods Imported Overland was passed. As a first step to implementing this, a border patrol consisting of a police inspector, sub-inspector and 4 constables was appointed with powers to collect duties from 1 January 1871. They were to move along the border between Queensland and New South Wales, collecting duties and keeping careful records regarding the type and value of goods and the amount of monies collected. They were also to note the places were crossings existed and recommend places where Customs offices could be most usefully established.

The Inspector, William Parry-Okeden, made a report on their findings in April 1871. 11 places were recommended for setting up customs offices, including Goondiwindi. On 12 April 1871, Richard Marshall, already Police Magistrate, Clerk of Petty Sessions, Land Agent and Land Commissioner at Goondiwindi, was appointed to also act as Customs Officer. He died the following year and was replaced by John Murphy, a sub-inspector of the Customs Border Patrol. It was soon reported that the effect of increased vigilance on the border was to deflect the importation of goods to Brisbane, reducing the amount of such trade through inland centres.

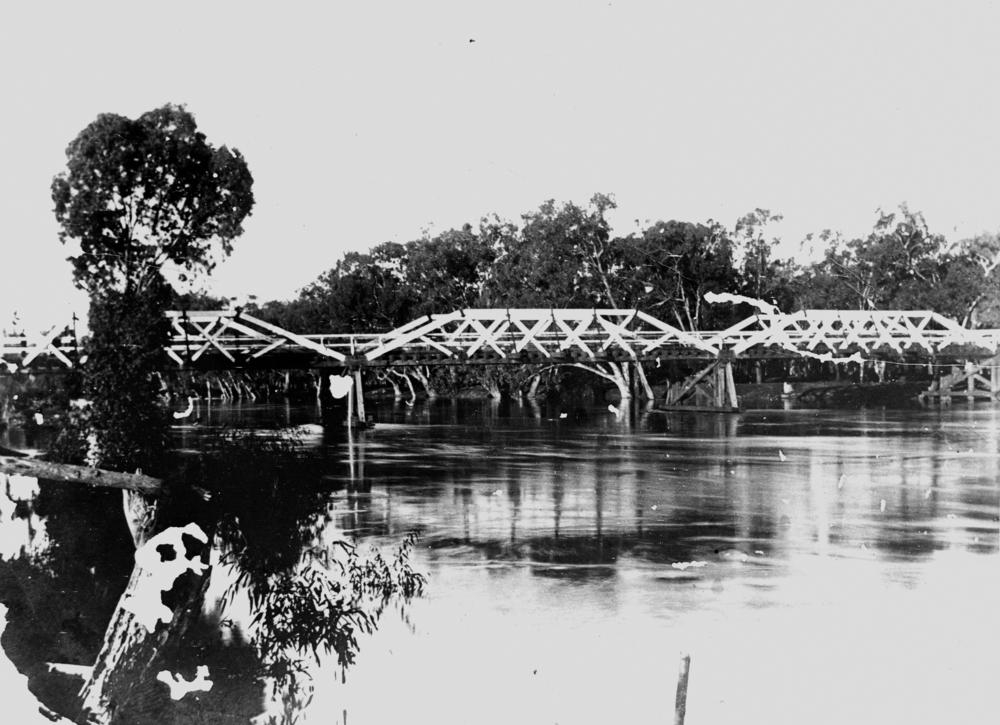
Bridge over the Macintyre River at Goondiwindi, circa 1890

Goondiwindi continued to develop however, and in 1880 a bridge, a joint project of the New South Wales and Queensland governments, replaced the ferry service across the Macintyre River. The bridge made it possible to cross the river at this point in all weathers and increased the importance of the town as a border crossing. In 1880 Charles F Cumming was appointed as Customs Officer for Goondiwindi. Cumming was also the Police Magistrate and had held this job and that of Land Agent in Goondiwindi the previous year. In 1881 a second Customs Officer was appointed and there were two officers at Goondiwindi until one was sent to Swan Creek following a reorganisation of staff in 1885. In 1887, Goondiwindi was listed by the Customs Department as one of 8 customs stations along the New South Wales border and was an important public crossing place.

The position of Customs Officer seems to have been an extension of police duties for some time and the books concerning Customs business were kept at the Court House even in 1898. There is no formal record of this building being a Customs House and it remained in private hands throughout the period when duties were collected. However, local tradition that it was connected with the Customs service is strong and Customs Officers may have unofficially used it.

After Federation of Australia in 1901, customs were no longer charged on goods between the states. The bridge over the Macintyre River was replaced by the present structure in 1914.

Around 1900, the shingled roof was replaced by corrugated iron, possibly after it changed hands in 1901. The building has undergone some alterations and extensions over the years of its use as a residence and, in its later years, as an antique shop. The Goondiwindi Town Council acquired it in 1975 and it was renovated by the Goondiwindi Historical Society and opened as a museum in October 1975.

== Description ==
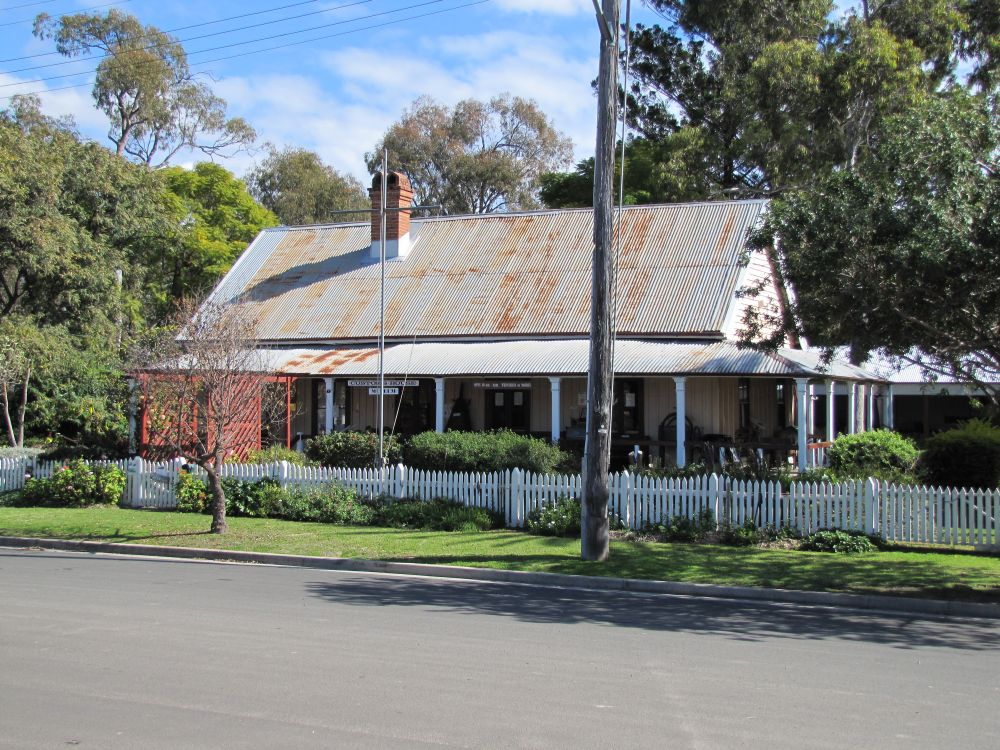
Customs House Museum, 2012

The Customs House Museum site at Goondiwindi is bounded by Maclean Street to the east and MacIntyre Street to the south. It contains a single storeyed timber building, known as the Customs House, at the corner of Maclean Street and MacIntyre Streets; a single storeyed timber cottage facing Maclean Street, and several recently constructed sheds within the grounds. This complex of modest buildings with steeply pitched roofs contributes to the townscape of Maclean St.

The Customs House Museum is a simple rectangular building with verandahs to the north, west and east, and an annex attached to the west, linked by a covered verandah. The building appears to have been built in three stages, being progressively extended out to the north and northwest, with the annex included in the final stage. Both the main building and the annex have steeply pitched corrugated iron roofs; the main building has a substantial brick chimney rising above the ridgeline. The verandahs are covered with a gently curved corrugated iron awning, with a skillion linking the annex to the main building. Openings to the south are protected with modest corrugated iron awnings.

The external cladding reflects the different stages of construction: the southern end of the building is clad in single skin timber slab with cover strips, with the studs internally exposed; the north eastern corner is clad in chamferboard, with externally exposed stud and bracing, while the rest of the building, including the annex and gable ends is clad in weatherboard. The gable ends are decorated with scalloped bargeboards.

The verandahs have chamfered posts with simple rectangular capitals and carved scalloped bases. The balustrades are constructed of square section balusters and handrail. The building has timber sash windows, and French doors opening out to the east.

Internally, the building has a full-width room to the southern end and four rooms either side of a central corridor to the northern end. The annex adjoins to the south of the western verandah, and contains two rooms and a toilet. The internal walls vary, corresponding to the varieties of external cladding, with some exposed framework, some horizontal boarding and some vertical; all the ceilings are timber- boarded. The fireplace in the southern room has timber surrounds.

The cottage is a modest timber building with a steeply pitched corrugated iron roof, a verandah to the front (east), an annex with a corrugated iron stove recess and timber porch to the rear (west). This building also appears to have been built in different stages, with the main part of the building being clad in weatherboard, while the annex is clad in chamferboard with externally exposed framing.

The complex also contains a range of more recently constructed sheds and display structures containing antique machinery.

== Heritage listing ==
Customs House Museum was listed on the Queensland Heritage Register on 21 October 1992 having satisfied the following criteria.

The place is important in demonstrating the evolution or pattern of Queensland's history.

The Customs House Museum illustrates the role of Goondiwindi as one of 14 border posts established before Federation to maintain tariff walls between the colonies. Customs duty was an important source of revenue and the need to establish such posts reflects the increase in the movement of goods along inland routes as pastoral development occurred in the west of Queensland. Goondiwindi was a major border crossing and the establishment of a customs service in this town reflects the way in which Customs were collected and the requirements of Government were carried out in remote areas.

The place is important because of its aesthetic significance.

The Customs House Museum is important as an early building in Goondiwindi whose form, scale and materials make a substantial contribution to the built character of the town.
