= Dumaresq River =

River in Australia

Dumaresq Macintyre Brook, Dumaresq or Severn River
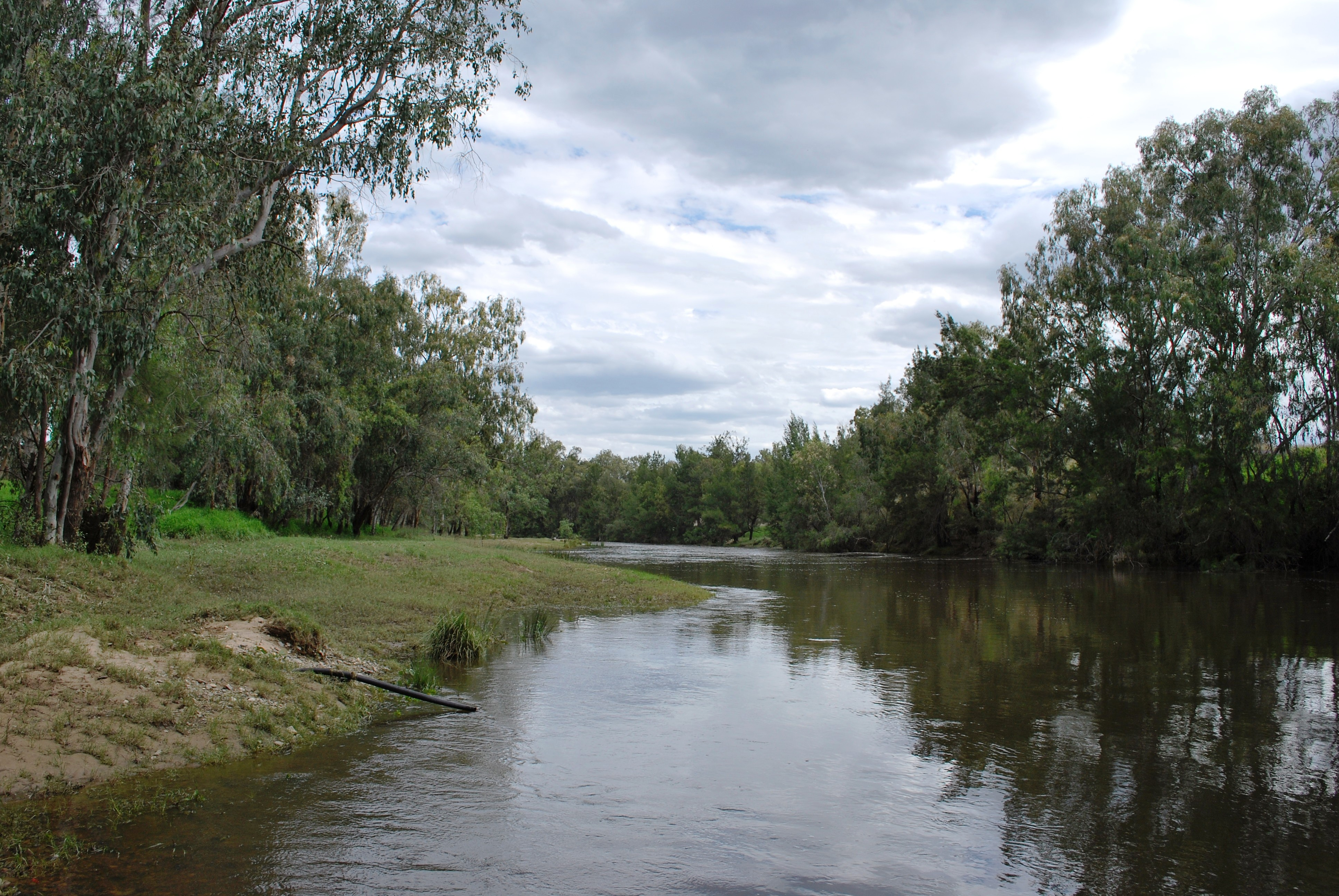
- Dumaresq River near Texas, Queensland. On the left bank is Queensland; on the right bank is New South Wales.

- Location of Dumaresq River mouth in New South Wales
- Etymology: In honour of the Dumaresq family, relatives of Ralph Darling
- Native name: Karaula (Bigambal)

Location
- Country: Australia
- State: New South Wales, Queensland
- Region: Northern Tablelands, Darling Downs, North West Slopes

Physical characteristics
- Source: Great Dividing Range
- Source confluence: Severn River (Queensland) and Tenterfield Creek
  - location: east of Glenlyon Dam, Queensland
  - coordinates: 28°57′42″S 151°32′32″E
  - elevation: 381 m (1,250 ft)
- Mouth: confluence with the Macintyre River
  - location: east of Boggabilla, New South Wales
  - coordinates: 28°39′45″S 150°29′1″E
  - elevation: 227 m (745 ft)
- Length: 214 km (133 mi)

Basin features
- River system: Macintyre River catchment, Murray–Darling basin
- Tributaries
  - left: Mole River, Beardy River, Macintyre Brook
  - right: Pike Creek, Severn River (Queensland)

The Dumaresq River /djuːˈmɛrɪk/ (Indigenous Bigambal: Karaula) is a perennial stream of the Macintyre catchment within the Murray–Darling basin, is located in the Northern Tablelands and North West Slopes regions of New South Wales and the Darling Downs region of Queensland, Australia.

Part of the course of the river marks the boundary between Queensland and New South Wales.

== Course and features ==
The river rises on the western slopes of the Great Dividing Range, formed by the confluence of the Queensland branch of the Severn River and the Tenterfield Creek, east of Glenlyon Dam in Queensland. The upper reaches of the Dumaresq River form north of Stanthorpe, Queensland. The Dumaresq River flows generally southwest and northwest, joined by fourteen tributaries, including the Mole River, Pike Creek, Beardy River, and Macintyre Brook, before reaching its confluence with the Macintyre River, east of Boggabilla. The river descends 154 metres (505 ft) over its 214-kilometre (133 mi) course.

The Dumaresq River, together with Pike Creek, the Mole, Beardy, Severn (Queensland), Severn (New South Wales), and Macintyre rivers are all part of the Border Rivers group. The Dumaresq River flows through Bonshaw, New South Wales and Yelarbon and Texas in Queensland. South of Texas, the Bruxner Highway crosses the Dumaresq River.

Within the river valley there are vineyards and numerous spots for fishing. Farmers in the valley once supported the tobacco industry with crop near towns such as Texas.

In April 2011, the water hyacinth weed was found in the river system for the first time.

== Etymology ==
The traditional custodians of the land surrounding the Dumaresq River are the indigenous Bigambul peoples, who called the river Karaula. The Kamilaroi people also have strong connections to the river.

The river was visited by European explorer and botanist, Allan Cunningham, in 1827 and named in honour of Lt-Colonel Henry Dumaresq, a relative of Ralph Darling, the Governor of New South Wales at that time. The river has an important role in the sustainability of livelihoods of people who live on and near its banks.

== See also ==
- Rivers of New South Wales
- Rivers of Queensland
