= Glenlyon Dam =

Dam in Queensland, Australia

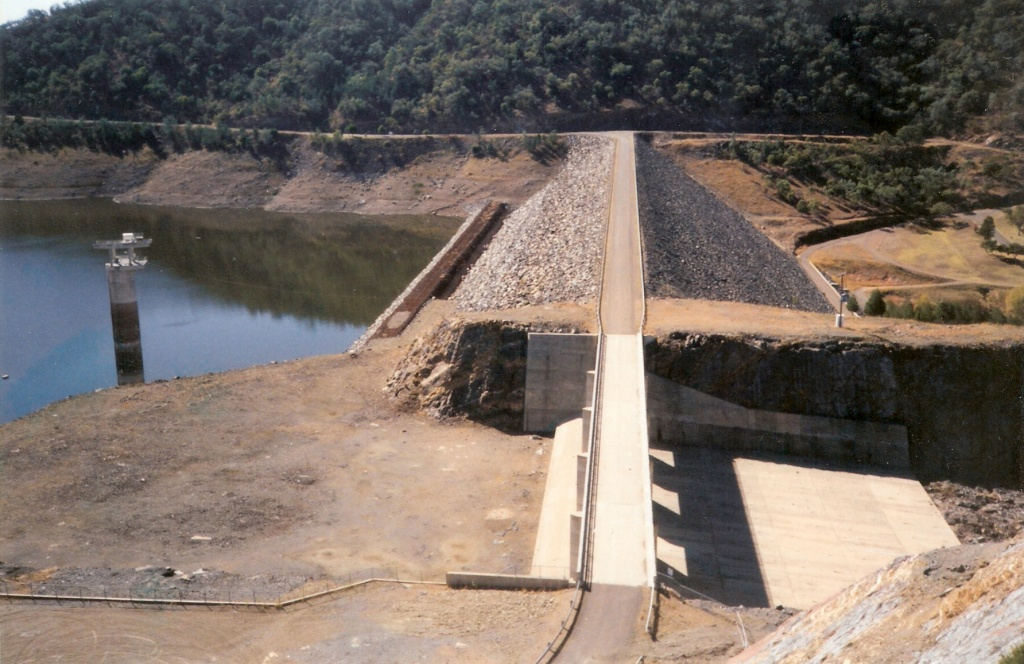
- The dam spillway, in 1994, during drought conditions

- Location of the dam in Queensland
- Interactive map of Glenlyon Dam
- Country: Australia
- Location: South East Queensland
- Coordinates: 28°57′54″S 151°28′13″E
- Purpose: Irrigation; Water supply
- Status: Operational
- Opening date: 1976
- Built by: Thiess; John Holland
- Owner: Border Rivers Commission
- Operator: SunWater

Dam and spillways
- Type of dam: Embankment dam
- Impounds: Pike Creek
- Height (foundation): 62 m (203 ft)
- Length: 445 m (1,460 ft)
- Elevation at crest: 423.62 m (1,389.8 ft)
- Width (crest): 10.6 m (35 ft) AHD
- Dam volume: 1,450×10^{3} m^{3} (51×10^{6} cu ft)
- Spillway type: Uncontrolled
- Spillway length: 74.4 m (244 ft)
- Spillway capacity: 4,400 m^{3}/s (160,000 cu ft/s)

Reservoir
- Creates: Lake Glenlyon; Pike Creek Reservoir
- Total capacity: 254,000 ML (206,000 acre⋅ft)
- Catchment area: 1,295 km^{2} (500 sq mi)
- Surface area: 1,800 ha (4,400 acres)
- Maximum water depth: 4.3 m (14 ft)
- Normal elevation: 407 m (1,335 ft) AHD

The Glenlyon Dam is an earth and rock-fill embankment dam across the Pike Creek, located roughly between Stanthorpe and Texas in South East Queensland near the border with New South Wales, in Australia. Completed in 1976, the dam wall was built on Pike Creek, a tributary of the Dumaresq River, 5 km (3.1 mi) upstream from the confluence of the Mole River and the Severn River branching from the Dumaresq. Its impoundment is known as Lake Glenlyon, and is also known as the Pike Creek Reservoir.

== Overview ==
The dam wall is 62 metres (203 ft) high, 445 metres (1,460 ft) long, and holds back 254,000 megalitres (206,000 acre⋅ft) of water when at full capacity. The resultant reservoir, called either Lake Glenlyon or the Pike Creek Reservoir, has a surface area of 1,750 hectares (4,300 acres), that draws from a catchment area of 1,295 square kilometres (500 sq mi). Managed by SunWater, the Glenlyon Dam provides water for irrigation of grain and fodder crops and for the supply of water.

In December 1994, the dam reached a critically low level of 2.2% and the next year it rose to just 12% of capacity during a series of droughts in Australia. The dam reached a peak of 110.78% on January 12, 2011, during the 2010-2011 Queensland floods.

== Recreation ==
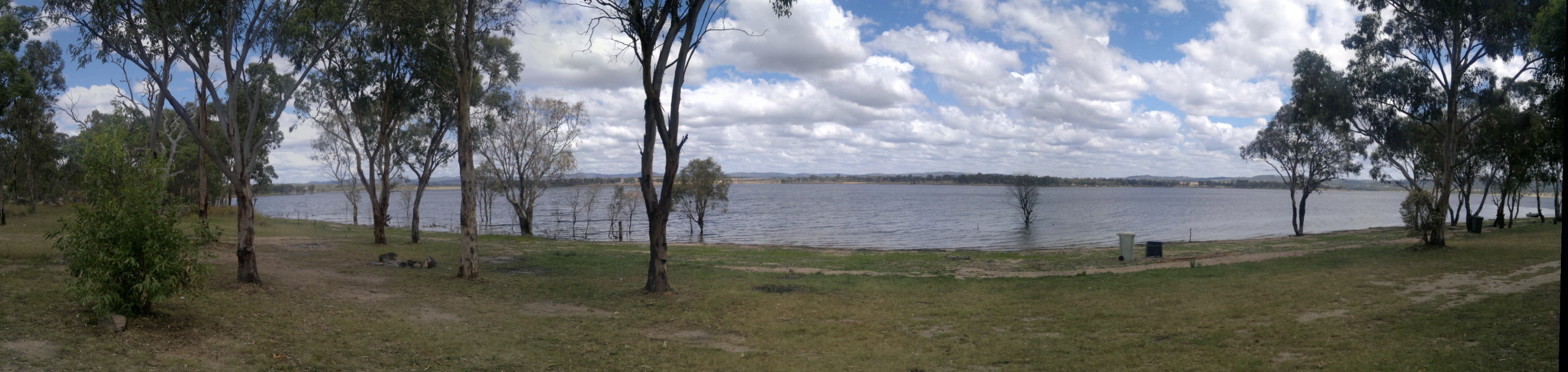
A panoramic view of the reservoir in 2012

Swimming, fishing, boating and water skiing are all permitted, with no restrictions on boating except near the dam wall. Two boat ramps facilitate access for boating. In the upper reaches of feeder creeks, there are large areas of standing timber and submerged logs.

The dam was stocked with golden perch, murray cod and silver perch while spangled perch, bony bream and eel-tailed catfish breed naturally. A Stocked Impoundment Permit is required to fish in the dam.
