= Pike Creek (Queensland) =

Pike
- Location of Pike Creek mouth in Queensland

Location
- Country: Australia
- State: Queensland
- Region: Darling Downs

Physical characteristics
- Source: Great Dividing Range
  - location: below Mount Magnus
  - coordinates: 28°30′34″S 151°48′14″E
  - elevation: 752 m (2,467 ft)
- Mouth: confluence with the Mole River to form the Dumaresq River
  - location: south of Glenlyon Dam
  - coordinates: 28°59′47″S 151°31′03″E
  - elevation: 360 m (1,180 ft)
- Length: 117 km (73 mi)

Basin features
- River system: Macintyre River catchment, Murray–Darling basin
- Reservoir: Glenlyon Lake

The Pike Creek, a perennial stream that is one of the Border Rivers and part of the Macintyre catchment within the Murray–Darling basin, is located in the Darling Downs region of Queensland, Australia

Pike Creek rises on the western slopes of the Great Dividing Range below Mount Magnus, southwest of Warwick and northwest of Stanthorpe. The creek flows generally west and then south, through the Glenlyon Dam and joined by nine minor tributaries before reaching its confluence with the Mole River to form the Dumaresq River. The creek descends 392 metres (1,286 ft) over its 117-kilometre (73 mi) course.

== See also ==
- List of rivers of Australia § Queensland
