= Goondiwindi Border Bridge =

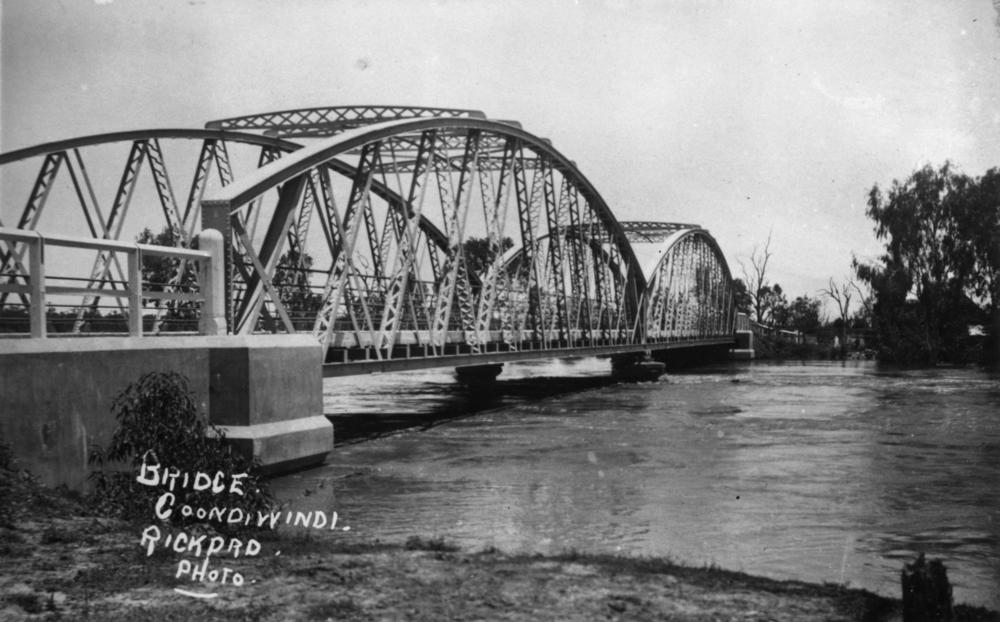
- Coordinates: 28.5500°S 150.3077°E
- Carries: Motor vehicles
- Crosses: Macintyre River
- Locale: Goondiwindi, Queensland, Australia
- Maintained by: Department of Transport and Main Roads
- Preceded by: highset timber bridge (1878–1914)

Characteristics
- Material: Steel
- Total length: 2 x 36.58 metres (120.0 ft)
- Width: 6.1 metres (20 ft)
- No. of spans: 2
- Piers in water: 1
- Load limit: 10 Ton
- Clearance above: 5 metres (16 ft)

History
- Designer: State Public Works Department, NSW
- Constructed by: Oakes and Oakes
- Construction start: 1914
- Construction end: 1915

Location
- Interactive map of Goondiwindi Border Bridge

The Border Bridge is a road bridge over the Macintyre River in Goondiwindi, Queensland, Australia. The bridge has no official name so it is also referred to as Goondiwindi Bridge or Macintyre River Bridge. The previous bridge, built before Australian federation, was the main hub for freight crossing the border between New South Wales and Queensland, where duties were collected by Customs.

The bridge is the second one to span the river at Goondiwindi. It was erected in 1914–1915 and replaced a timber structure which served the border river crossing from 1878. The bridge was built at the expense of both states, at a cost of £12,325/5/–, but on the responsibility of Queensland. It consists of two 120ft. spans of hogbacked steel-lattice girders, braced overhead with steel lattice bracing. The roadway has a width of 20ft. in the clear, and is carried above the highest known flood level.

The historic Border Bridge is a landmark of Goondiwindi but it is not listed on the Queensland Heritage Register.
