= Severn River (Queensland) =

River in Queensland, Australia

Severn
- Location of Severn River (QLD) mouth in Queensland

Location
- Country: Australia
- State: Queensland
- Region: Darling Downs

Physical characteristics
- Source: Great Dividing Range
  - location: near Stanthorpe
  - coordinates: 28°40′00″S 151°54′28″E
  - elevation: 784 m (2,572 ft)
- Mouth: confluence with the Dumaresq River
  - location: near Riverside
  - coordinates: 28°57′49″S 151°32′34″E
  - elevation: 375 m (1,230 ft)
- Length: 90 km (56 mi)

Basin features
- River system: Macintyre River catchment, Murray–Darling basin
- National park: Sundown National Park

The Severn River, a perennial river that forms part of the Border Rivers group, is part of the Macintyre catchment of the Murray-Darling basin, located in the Darling Downs region of Queensland, Australia.

== Course and features ==
The Queensland branch of the Severn River rises on the western slopes of the Great Dividing Range south of Stanthorpe. The river flows generally south by west, through the Sundown National Park, and forms its confluence with the Dumaresq River near the Tenterfield Creek and Glenlyon Dam Road, east of the settlement of Riverside. The point where the rivers form their confluence marks part of the border between Queensland and New South Wales. The Dumaresq flows into the Macintyre River. The Queensland branch of the Severn River is often noted as the ultimate source of the Darling River. The Severn River descends 409 metres (1,342 ft) over its 90-kilometre (56 mi) course.

River red gums, she-oaks, melaleucas and bottlebrushes can all be found along the river.

== See also ==
- List of rivers of Australia § Queensland
- Severn River (New South Wales)
