= Beardy River =

Coordinates: 29°19′S 151°30′E

Beardy River Glen Creek, Robertsons Creek, Washpool Creek
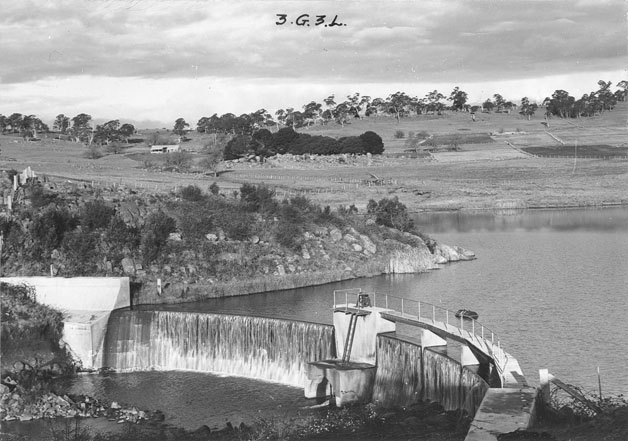
- The Beardy River weir

Location
- Country: Australia
- State: New South Wales
- IBRA: New England Tablelands
- District: New England
- Municipality: Glen Innes Severn

Physical characteristics
- Source
  - location: near Deepwater
  - elevation: 1,030 m (3,380 ft)
- Source confluence: Dumaresq River
  - location: near Bonshaw
  - elevation: 354 m (1,161 ft)
- Length: 90 km (56 mi)

Basin features
- River system: Murray–Darling basin

Beardy River, a perennial river that is part of the Murray–Darling basin, is located in the New England region of New South Wales, Australia.

== Course ==
The river rises 14 kilometres (8.7 mi) north–north–west of Deepwater and flows south–west, west–north–west and then north–north-west, before its confluence with the Dumaresq River, about 16 kilometres (9.9 mi) south–east of Bonshaw. The river generally runs south of Torrington State Recreation Area, descending 675 metres (2,215 ft) over its 90 kilometres (56 mi) course.

== Wildlife in Beardy River region ==
The Beardy River region, particularly the Beardy River Hill Catchment Management Authority sub-region, is rich in rare flora and fauna. Endangered plants such as the MacNutt's wattle, velvet wattle and Torrington pea have been found here. The area is also home to endangered birds such as the glossy black-cockatoo, brown treecreeper, swift parrot, square-tailed kite and barking owl. The area also has a few marsupials, including the spotted-tailed quoll, squirrel glider and koala.

== Gallery ==
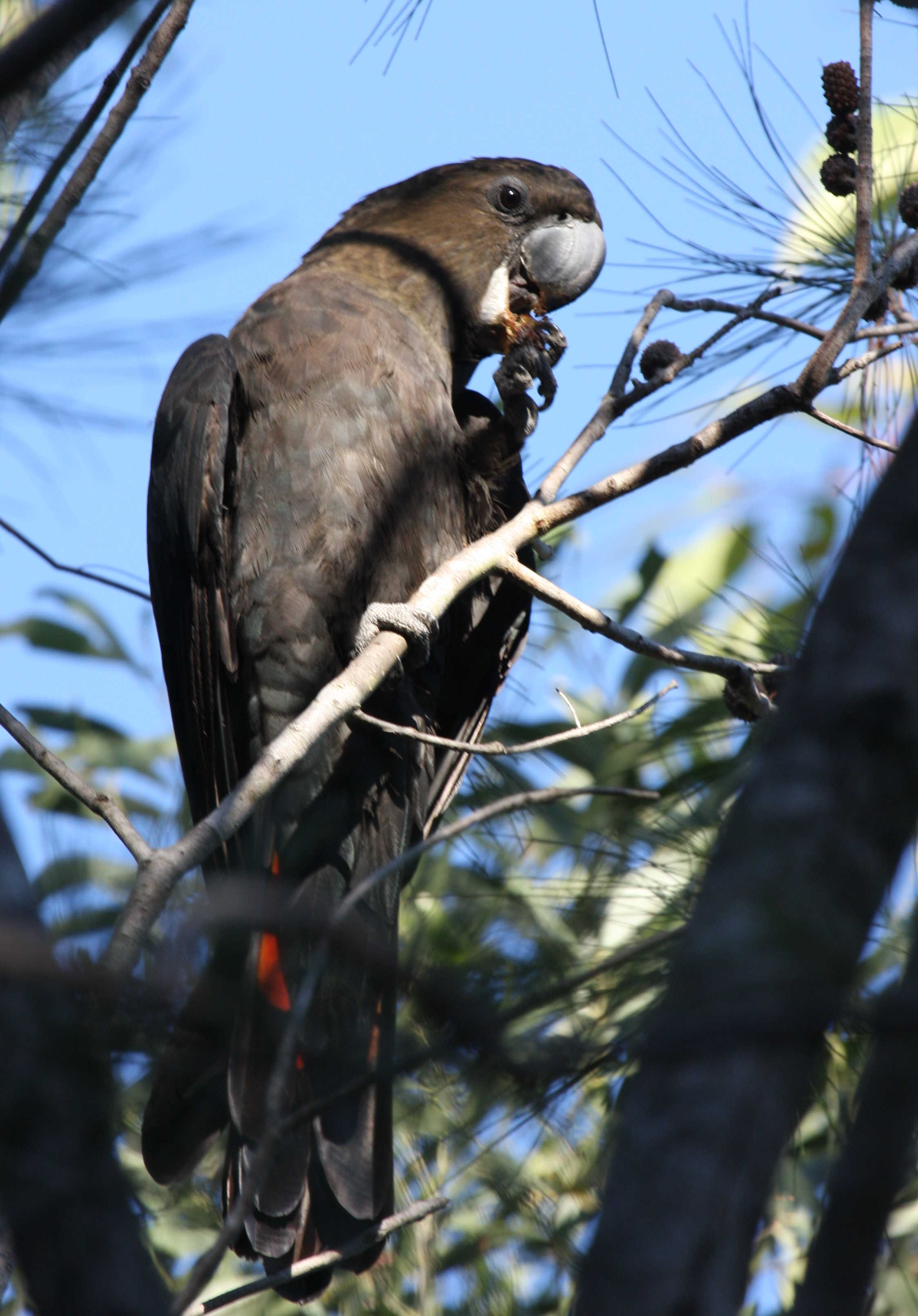
A male glossy black-cockatoo.

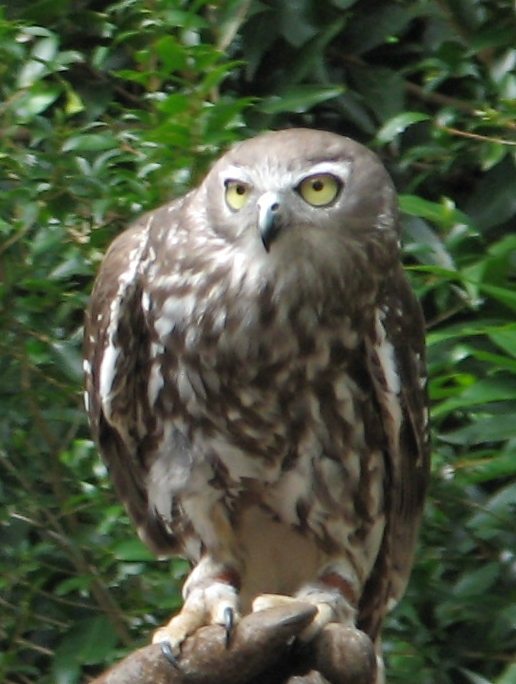
The barking owl, a resident of central Queensland, Australia

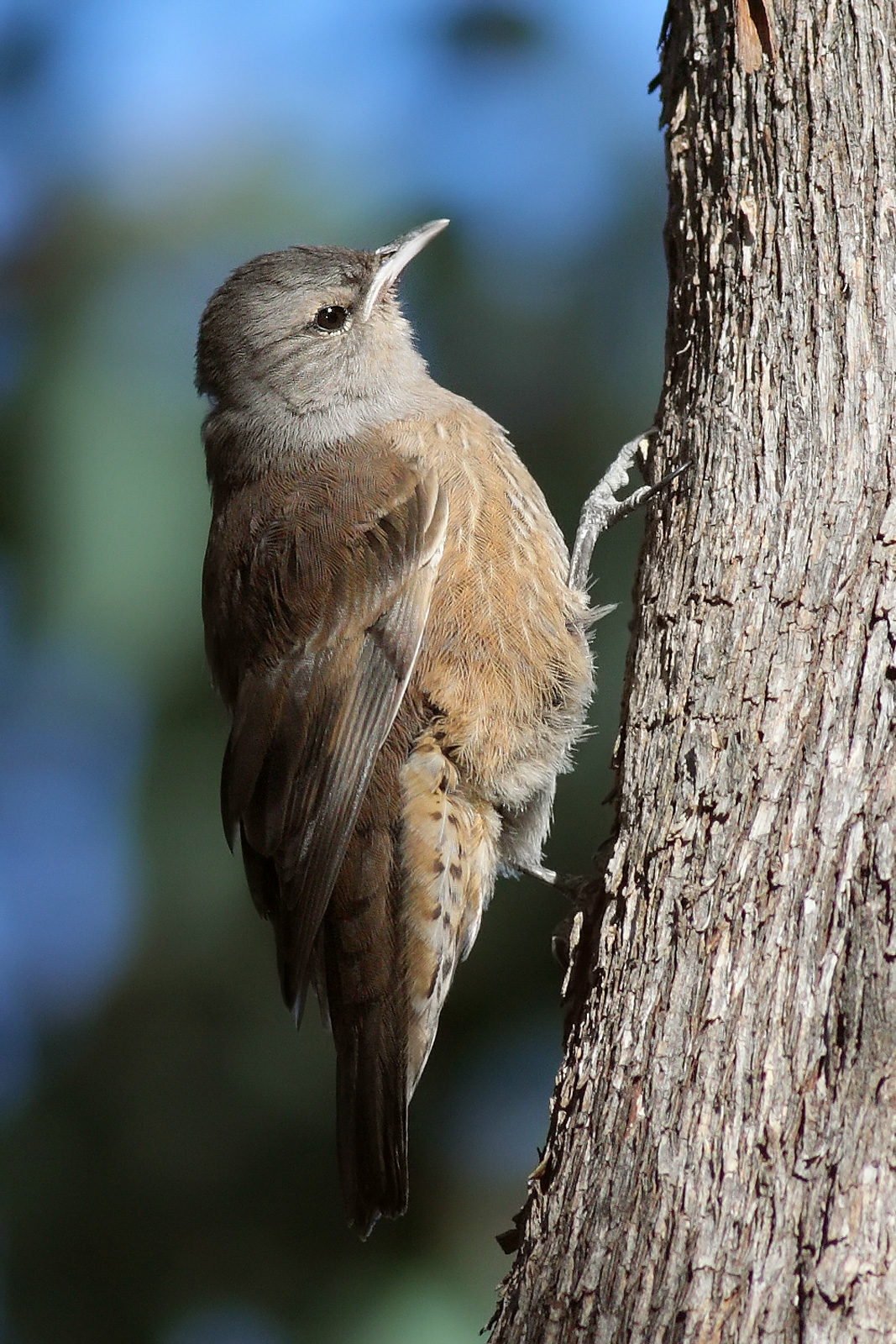
A brown treecreeper
