= Murray–Darling basin =

Largest Australian river catchment

Murray–Darling Basin
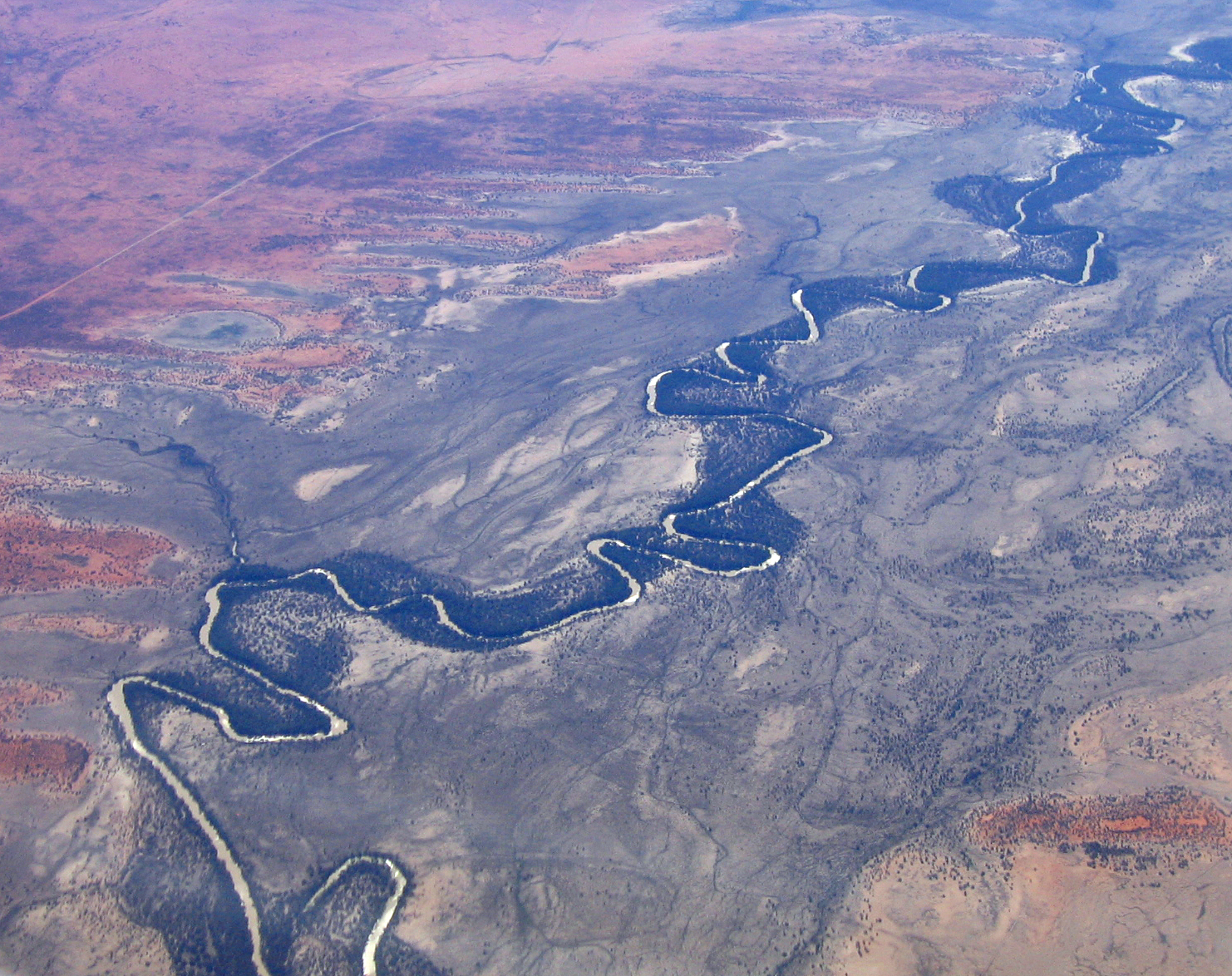
- One of the three main rivers of the basin, the Darling, near Menindee

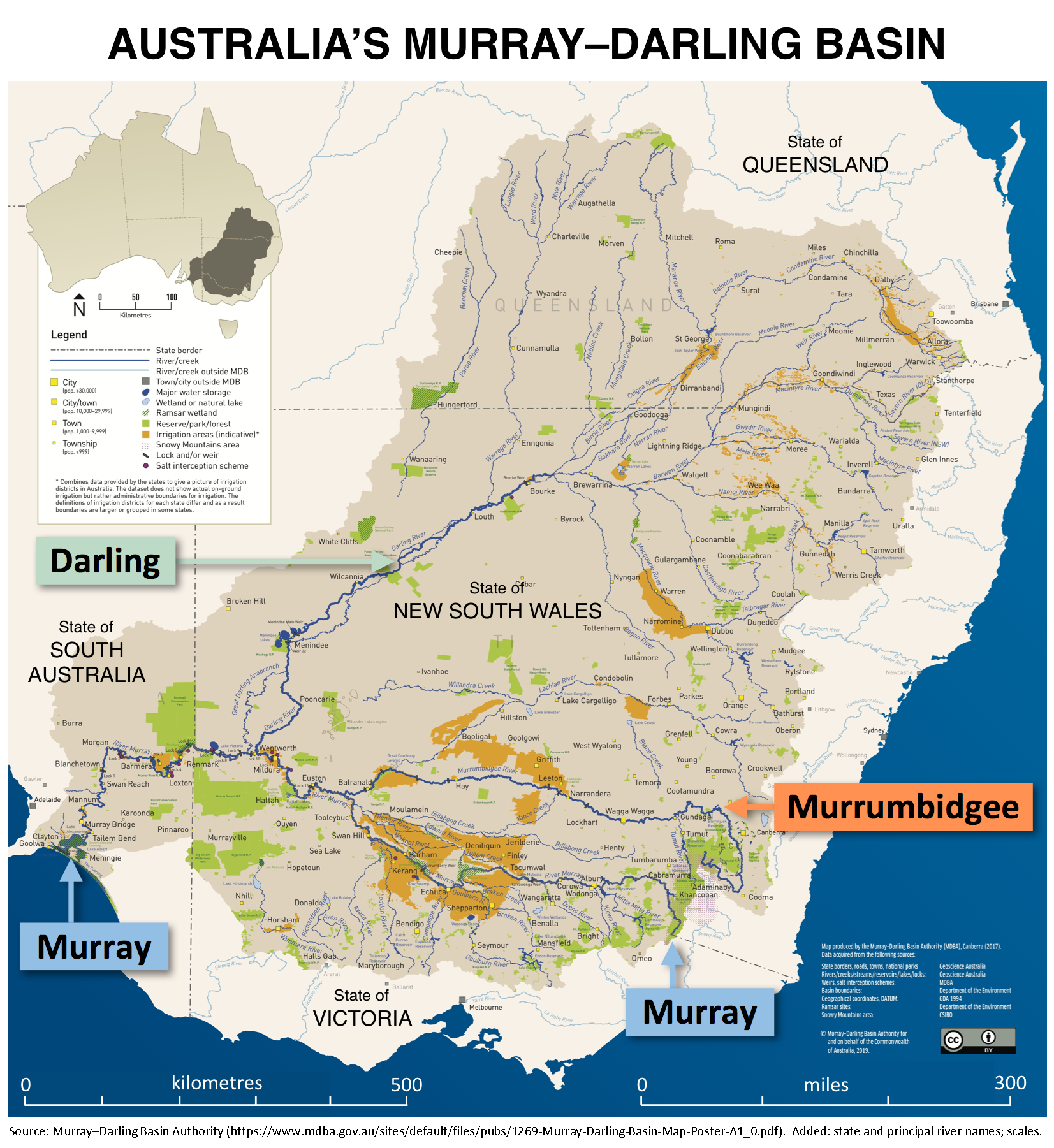
- (click to enlarge map)
- Length: 3,375 km (2,097 mi)
- Area: 1,061,469 km^{2} (409,835 mi^{2})

Geology
- Age: Late Silurian to Early Carboniferous

Geography
- Country: Australia
- States and territories: List: Queensland; New South Wales; Victoria; South Australia, Australian Capital Territory
- Rivers: List: Murray; Darling; Murrumbidgee; Warrego; Lachlan; Goulburn; Campaspe; Mitta Mitta; Loddon; and numerous other tributaries as listed in the table

The Murray–Darling Basin is a geographical area in the interior of south-east Australia, encompassing the drainage basin of the tributaries of the Murray River, Australia's longest river, and the Darling River, a right tributary of the Murray and Australia's third-longest river. The Basin, which includes six of Australia's seven longest rivers and covers around one-seventh of the Australian landmass, is one of the country's most significant agricultural areas providing one-third of Australia's food supply. Located west of the Great Dividing Range, it drains southwest into the Great Australian Bight and spans most of the states of New South Wales and Victoria, the Australian Capital Territory, and parts of the states of Queensland (the lower third) and South Australia (the southeastern corner).

The Basin is 3,375 kilometres (2,097 mi) in length, with the Murray River being 2,508 km (1,558 mi) long. Most of the 1,061,469 km^{2} (409,835 sq mi) basin is flat, low-lying and far inland, and receives little direct rainfall. The many rivers it contains tend to be long and slow-flowing, and carry a volume of water that is large only by Australian standards.

The Snowy Mountains Scheme provides some security of water flows to the Murray–Darling Basin, providing approximately 2,100 gigalitres (7.4×10^{10} cu ft) of water a year to the Basin for use in Australia's irrigated agriculture industry, which is worth about A$3 billion per annum, representing more than 40% of the gross value of the nation's agricultural production.

== The original inhabitants ==
The Basin has been home to a large number of Aboriginal people whose traditional lifestyle and cultures have been gradually altered by the arrival of Europeans, while others were outright killed by the settlers. Although some tribes organised resistance, such as the Maraura, whose territory lay around the Rufus River above Renmark and the Tanganekald near The Coorong, many were eventually either killed, exiled, or succumbed to disease. Contemporary organised political associations of First Nations communities, such as the Murray Darling Rivers Indigenous Nations, continue to advocate for protection and self-governing management of water resources across the Basin.

== Native fauna ==
The Murray–Darling Basin is home to many native animal species. The true numbers may not be known, but a fairly confident estimate has been made of these animals and the current status of their population. The study found that there were:

- 80 species of mammals, with 62 extinct and 10 endangered
- 55 species of frogs, with 18 endangered
- 46 species of snakes, with five endangered
- five species of turtles, with none endangered
- 34 species of fish, with up to half of them either threatened or of conservation significance

Historical records show that the previous abundances of fish provided a reliable food source. The bountiful fish became concentrated when the early stages of a flood left shallow water across the floodplain. Today, roughly 24 native freshwater fish and another 15–25 marine and estuarine species are existent in the Basin, a very low biodiversity.

=== 2018–2019 fish kill ===
Over Christmas 2018 and January 2019 there were two mass deaths of fish in the waters of the Basin, the first numbering 10,000, the second in the hundreds of thousands. Species affected were Murray cod, golden perch, silver perch and bony herring. Some blamed the draining of water from the Menindee Lakes by WaterNSW, with only 2.5% of the original water volume in the lakes being left; after the first fish kill, both the Department of Primary Industries (DPI) and WaterNSW blamed the ongoing drought affecting Australia, while the DPI blamed the second kill on a disruption of an algal bloom caused by a sudden fall in temperature.

=== 2023 fish kill ===
In March 2023, millions of fish were reported dead along the Darling River at Menindee, following a heatwave. As the clean-up began, police attributed the cause to (naturally occurring) hypoxic blackwater. Initial investigations by the New South Wales Environment Protection Authority (EPA) included single water samples at six sites and were criticised as inadequate. Subsequently it was announced that the New South Wales government will treat the deaths as a "pollution incident", thus giving the EPA greater investigative powers; earlier testing was described as being primarily intended to ensure public safety.

== Introduced species ==
Four varieties of carp were used to stock up fish dams. Since then they have made their way into the river systems, where they spread quite quickly. Human introduction, possibly by anglers using small carp illegally as live bait, has also increased their distribution. These fish are very mobile, breed rapidly and can survive in very shallow water and through long periods of very low dissolved oxygen content.

Carp are a problem because they feed by sucking gravel from the riverbed and taking all the edible material off it, before returning the rest to the water. This stirs up all the sediment, reducing the quality of the water. A project for developing daughterless carp shows promise for eliminating carp from the river system.

Cane toads have entered the upper reaches of the Darling Basin and there are several reports of individuals being found further down the system. Cane toads compete with native amphibians and are toxic to native carnivores.

Phyla canescens has invaded wetlands and floodplains with heavy clay soils in the Murray–Darling Basin, to the detriment of the native vegetation; the plant does best in habitats that are inundated occasionally, although it cannot compete with the grass Paspalum distichum and the sedge Eleocharis plana in more heavily inundated sites.

== Physiography ==
This area is one of the physiographic provinces of the larger East Australian basins division, and encompasses the smaller Naracoorte Platform and Encounter Shelf physiographic sections.

Total water flow in the Murray–Darling Basin 1885 to the present has averaged around 24,000 gigalitres (24,000 hm^{3}; 19,000,000 acre⋅ft) per year. This is the lowest rate of the world's major river systems. About 6.0 per cent of Australia's total rainwater falls into the Basin. In most years only half of this quantity reaches the sea and in dry years much less. Estimated total annual flows for the Basin have ranged from 5,000 gigalitres (5,000 hm^{3}; 4,100,000 acre⋅ft) in 1902 to 57,000 gigalitres (57,000 hm^{3}; 46,000,000 acre⋅ft) in 1956. Despite the magnitude of the Basin, the hydrology of the streams within it is quite varied.

These waters are divided into four types:

- The Darling and Lachlan basins. These have extremely variable flows from year to year, with the smallest annual flow being typically as little as 1 per cent of the long-term mean and the largest often more than ten times the mean. Periods of zero flow in most rivers can extend to months and in the drier parts (Warrego, Paroo and Lower Darling Basins) to years. Flows in these rivers are not strongly seasonal. In the northern regions the majority of floods occur in the summer from monsoonal penetration. For most of the Darling and Lachlan catchments it is typical to see high or low flows begin in winter and extend to the following autumn (see El Niño). High water extraction rates for irrigation and mining have heavily compromised these rivers.
- The southwestern basins (Campaspe, Loddon, Avoca, Wimmera). These have a marked winter rainfall maximum and relatively lower precipitation variability than the Lachlan or Darling. However, the age and infertility of the soils mean that run-off ratios are exceedingly low (for comparison, around a tenth that of a European or North American catchment with a similar climate). Thus, variability of runoff is very high and most of the terminal lakes found in these basins very frequently dry up. Almost all runoff occurs in the winter and spring and, in the absence of large dams for regulation, these rivers are often seasonally dry during summer and autumn.
- A number of small catchments in South Australia, of which the largest are the Angas River flowing through Strathalbyn and the Finniss River further west, are part of the Murray–Darling Basin. These catchments lead to Lake Alexandrina, one of the lakes at the end of the Murray system. The Angas River is often dry in summer because of high levels of water extraction. The Finniss River has permanent flow into Lake Alexandrina but was cut off by a weir for several years of drought in the early 21st century.
- The Murray, Murrumbidgee and Goulburn (except the Broken River which resembles the southwestern basins) basins. Because these catchments have headwaters in alpine country with relatively young peaty soils, the runoff ratios are much higher than in other parts of the Basin. Consequently, although gross precipitation variability is no lower than in the Lachlan or Darling basins, runoff variability is markedly lower than in other parts of the Basin. Typically these rivers never cease to flow and the smallest annual flow is around 30 per cent of the long-term mean and the largest around three times the mean. In most cases the flow peaks very strongly with the spring snow melt and troughs in mid-autumn.

The two principal rivers of the Basin, the Murray and Darling, bring water from the high ranges of the east and carry it west then south through long flat and dry inland areas, often resulting in alluvial channel wetlands, such as The (Great) Cumbung Swamp, at the terminus of the Lachlan and Murrumbidgee Rivers. Nevertheless, these waters are subject to major diversions for municipal drinking supplies and irrigated agriculture that began in the 1890s. Currently, 4 major reservoirs, 14 lock and weir structures, and five coastal barrages interject the water flowing down the Murray–Darling. Of the approximately 13,000 gigalitres (13,000 hm^{3}; 10,500,000 acre⋅ft) of flow in the Basin, which studies have shown to be divertible, 11,500 gigalitres (11,500 hm^{3}; 9,320,000 acre⋅ft) are removed for irrigation, industrial use, and domestic supply. Agricultural irrigation accounts for about 95 per cent of the water removed, including for the growing of rice and cotton. This extraction is highly controversial among scientists in Australia, regarding the agriculture industry's high water use in a region extremely short of water (as much due to exceptionally low run-off coefficients as to low rainfall). These extensive irrigation systems require a reliable supply of water, not the unpredictable flows that characterise the Murray–Darling. These structures and irrigation implements were ideal when there was a steady flow of water. However, during "the Big Dry", as the early 2000s drought came to be known, Australian farmers experienced a scarcity unlike ever before. The drought was so severe that numerous rivers and streams such as the Murray–Darling stopped flowing. The Basin contains more than 30,000 wetlands. Eleven of these are protected under the Ramsar Convention of Wetlands of International Importance.

=== Rivers in the Murray–Darling Basin ===
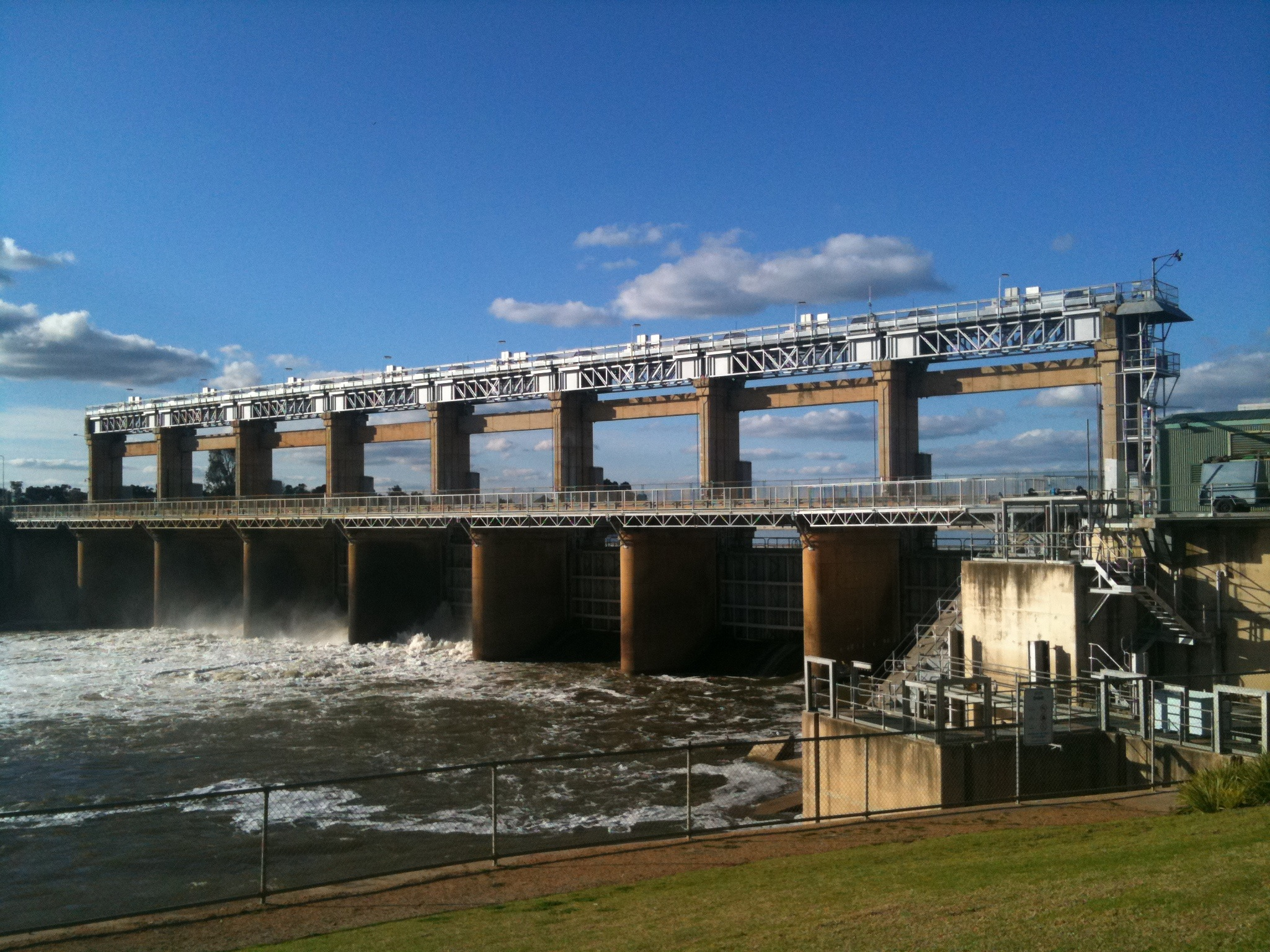
Yarrawonga Weir on the Murray River forms Lake Mulwala, 2010

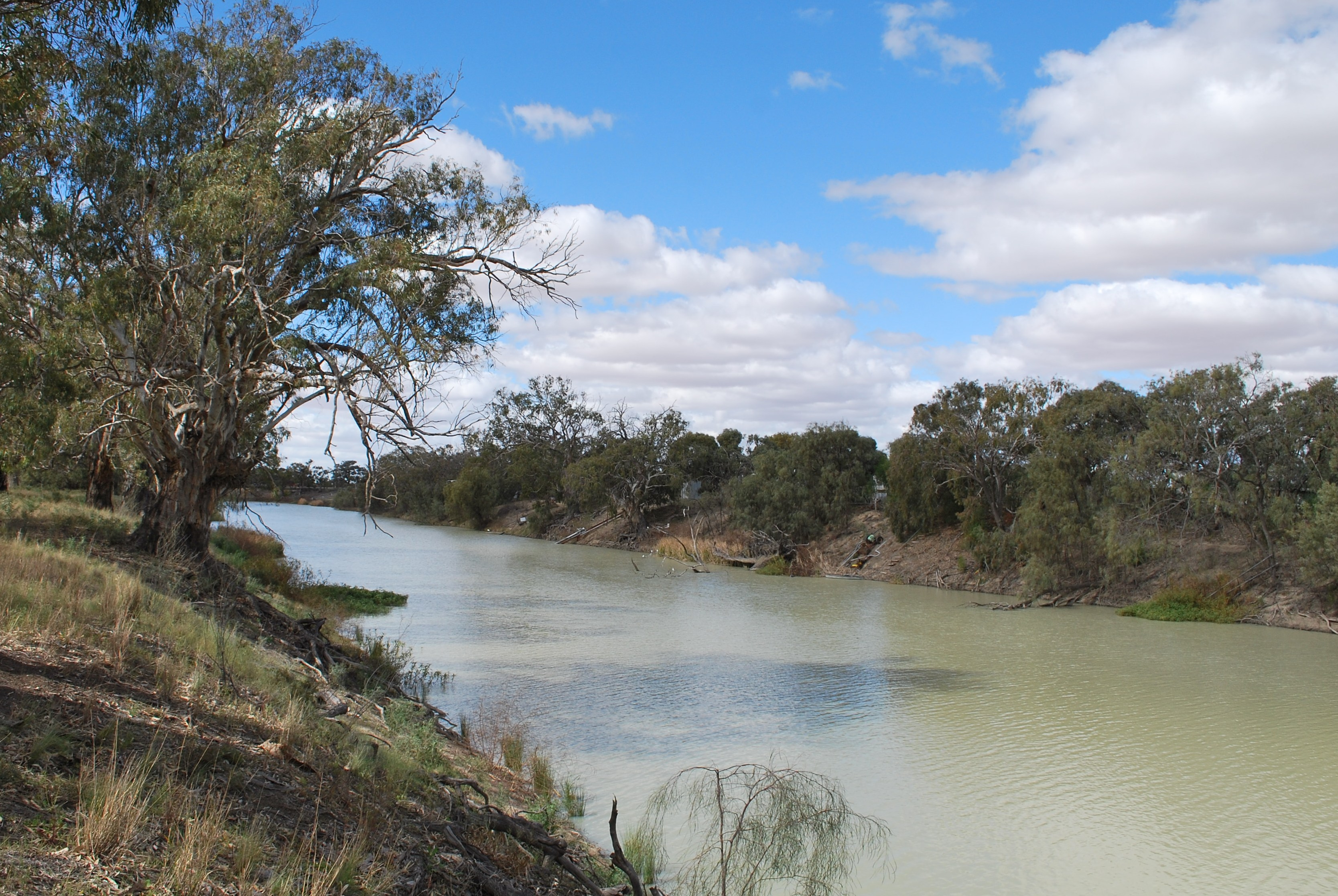
Darling River at Menindee, 2009

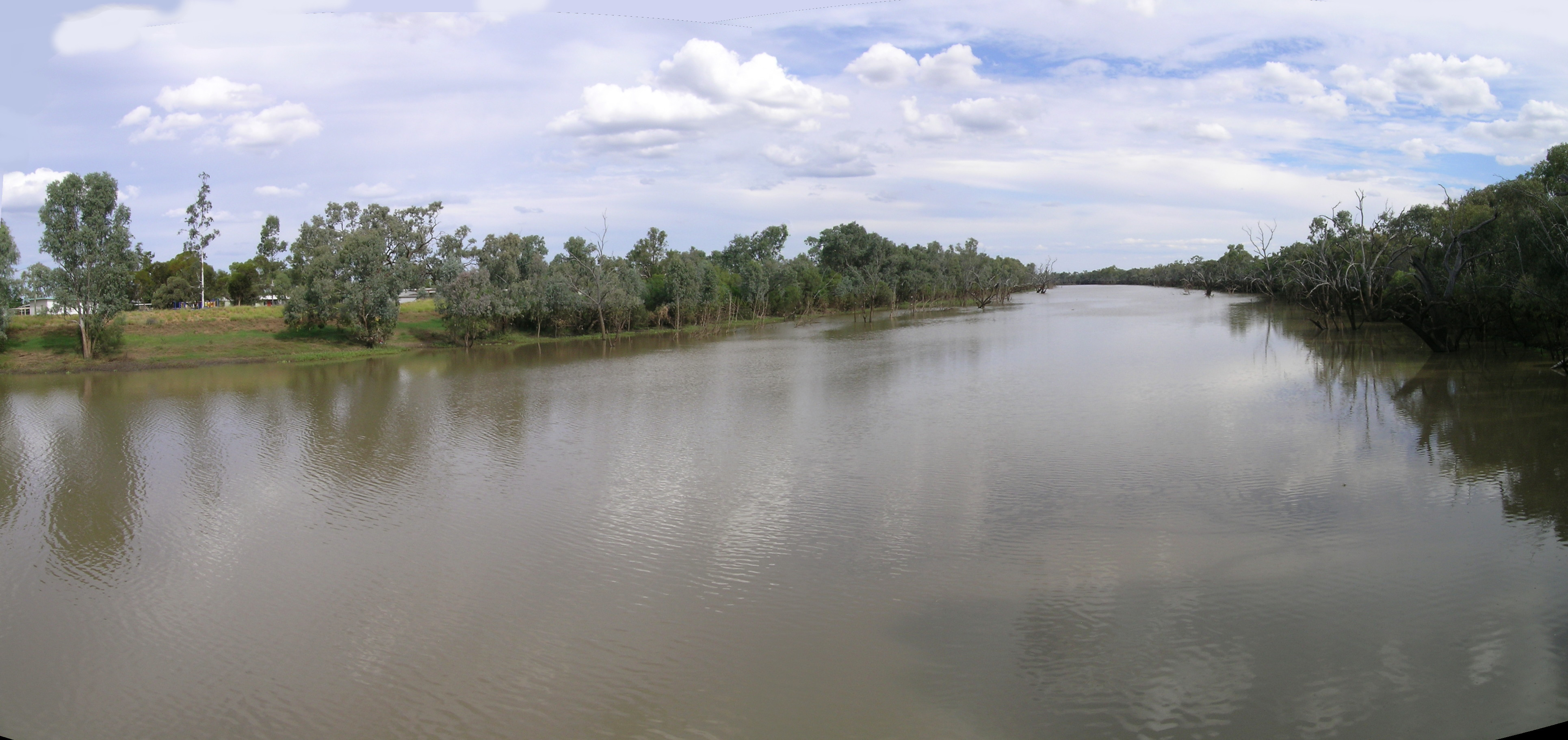
Warrego River at Cunnamulla, 2010

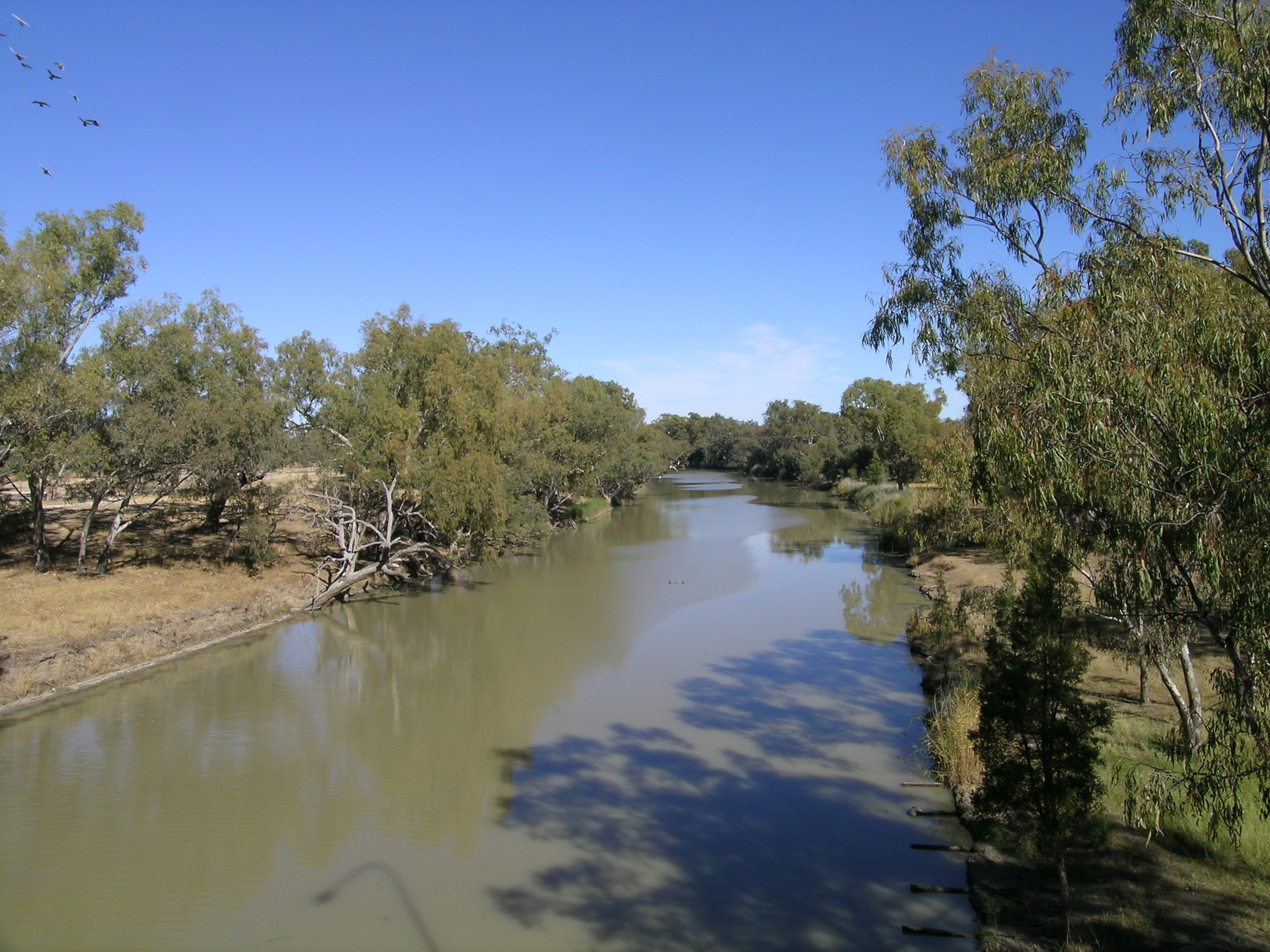
Barwon River at Collarenebri, 2008

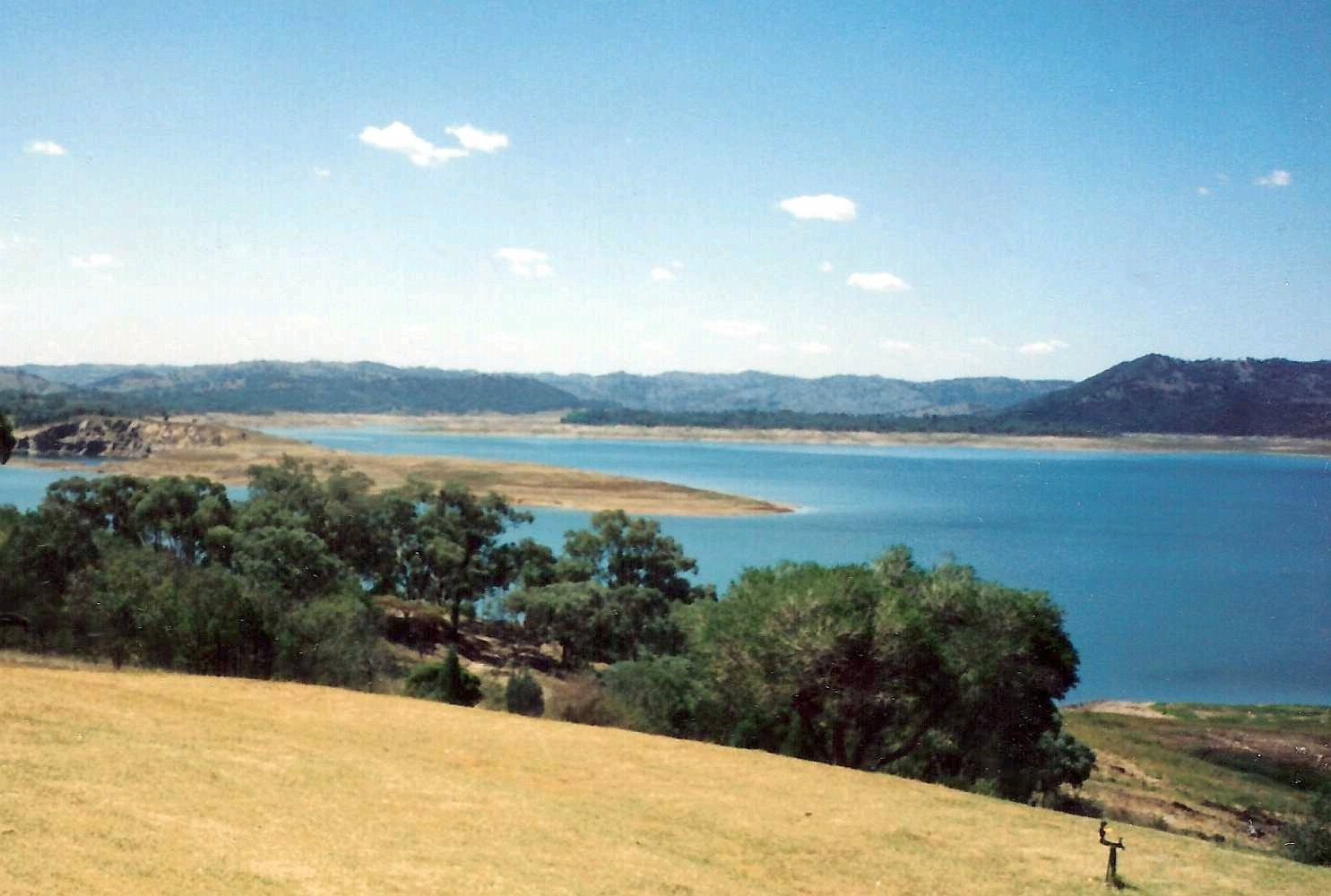
Lake Burrendong, formed at the confluence of the Macquarie River and Cudgegong River, 1995

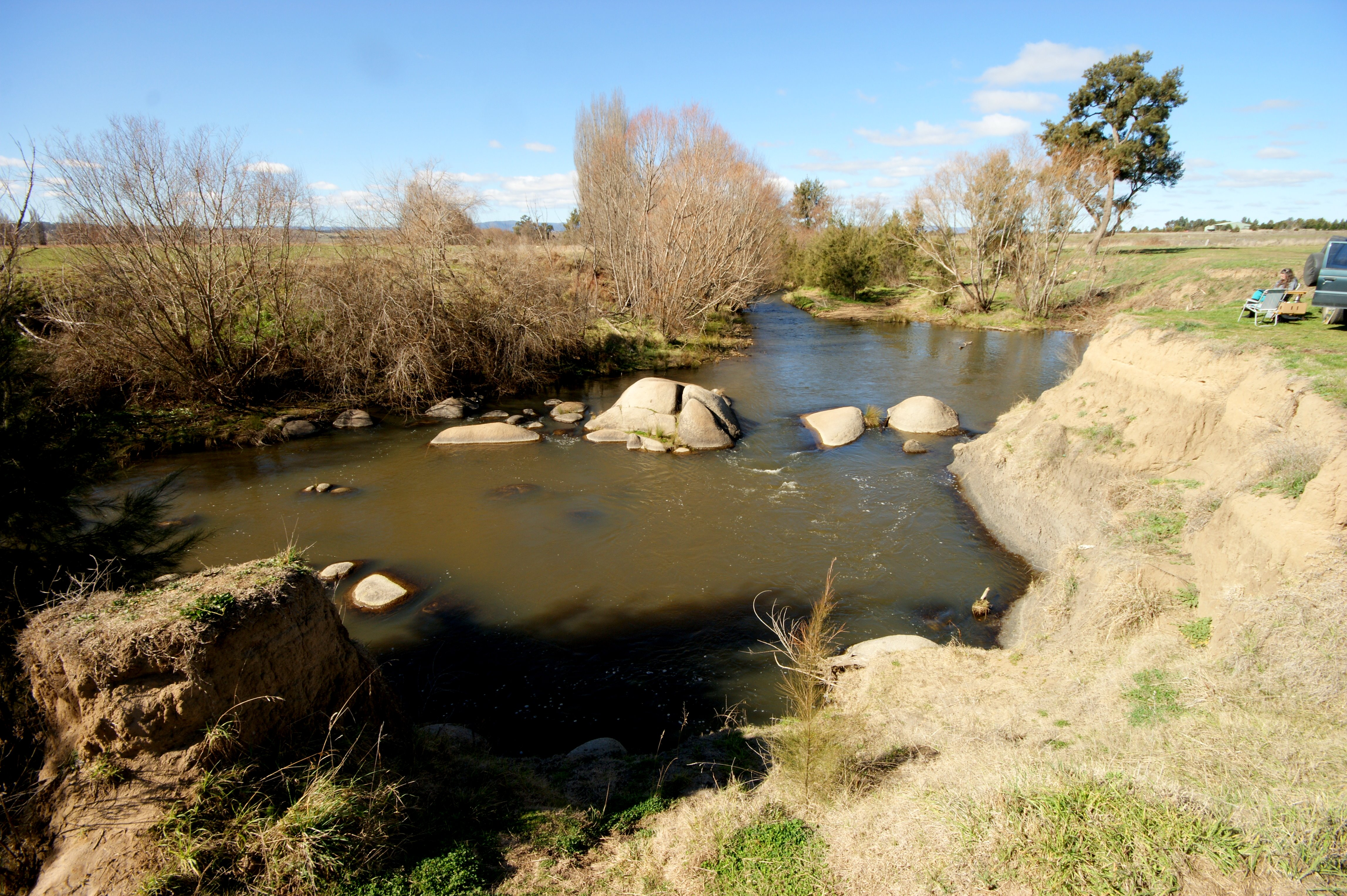
Macquarie River at Bathurst, 2009

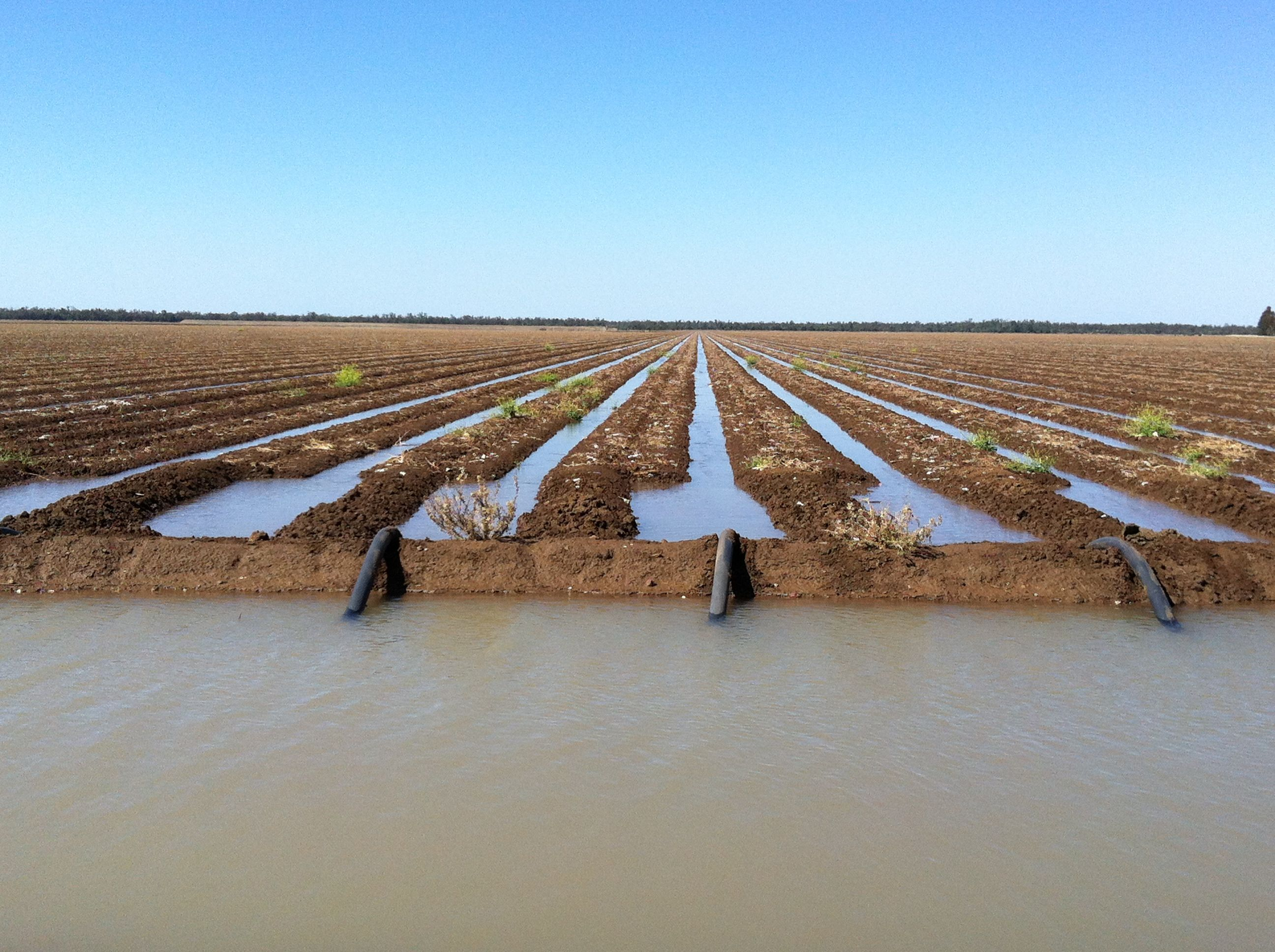
Siphon irrigation of cotton on the Balonne River near St George, 2012

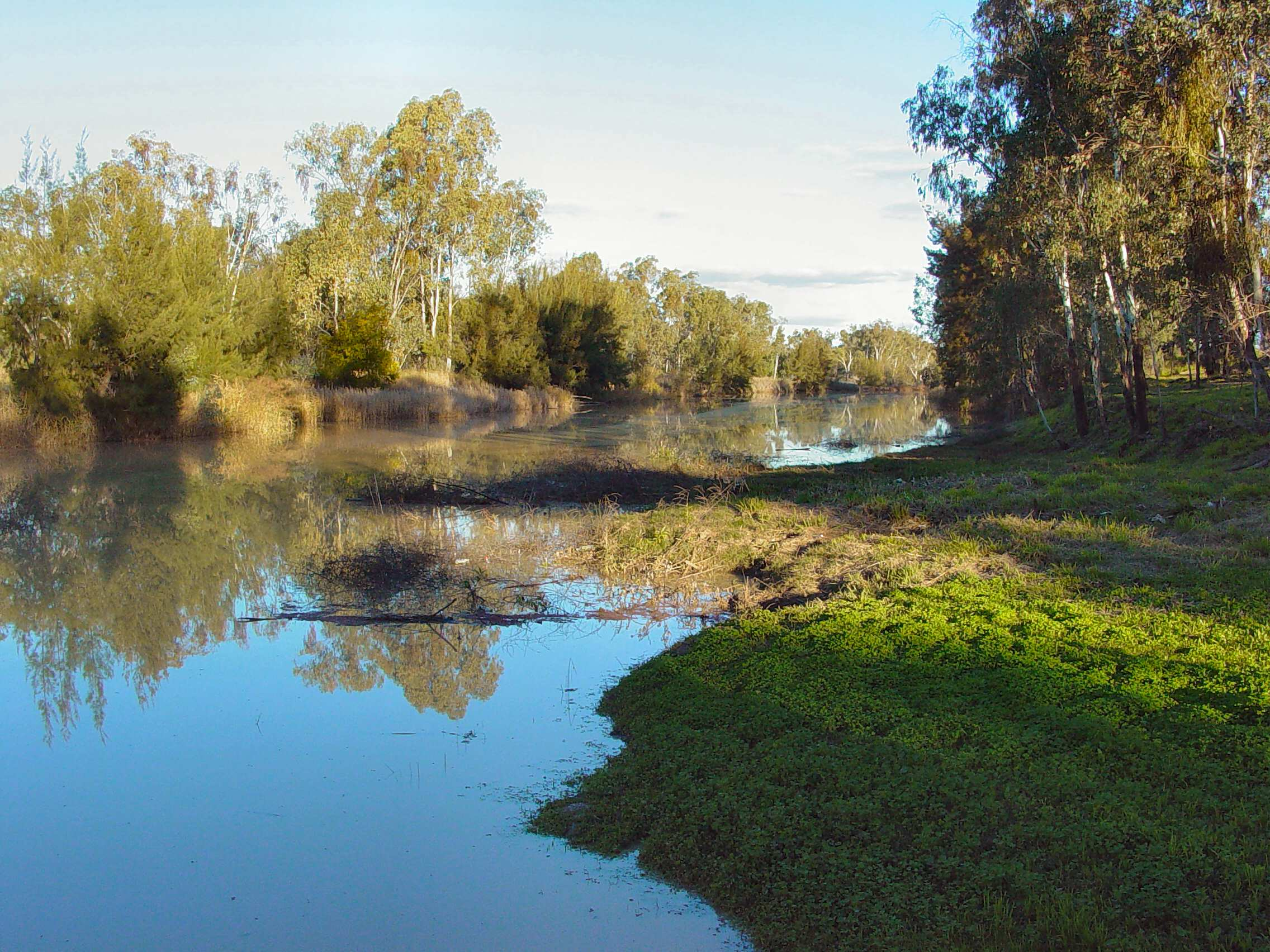
Maranoa River at Mitchell, 2005

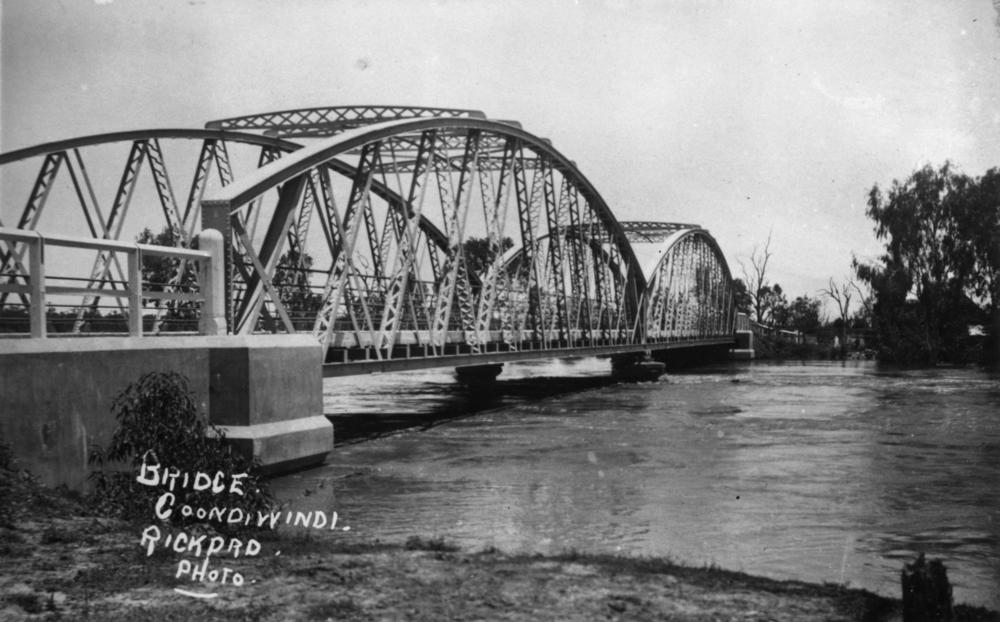
Macintyre River in flood at Goondiwindi, 1921

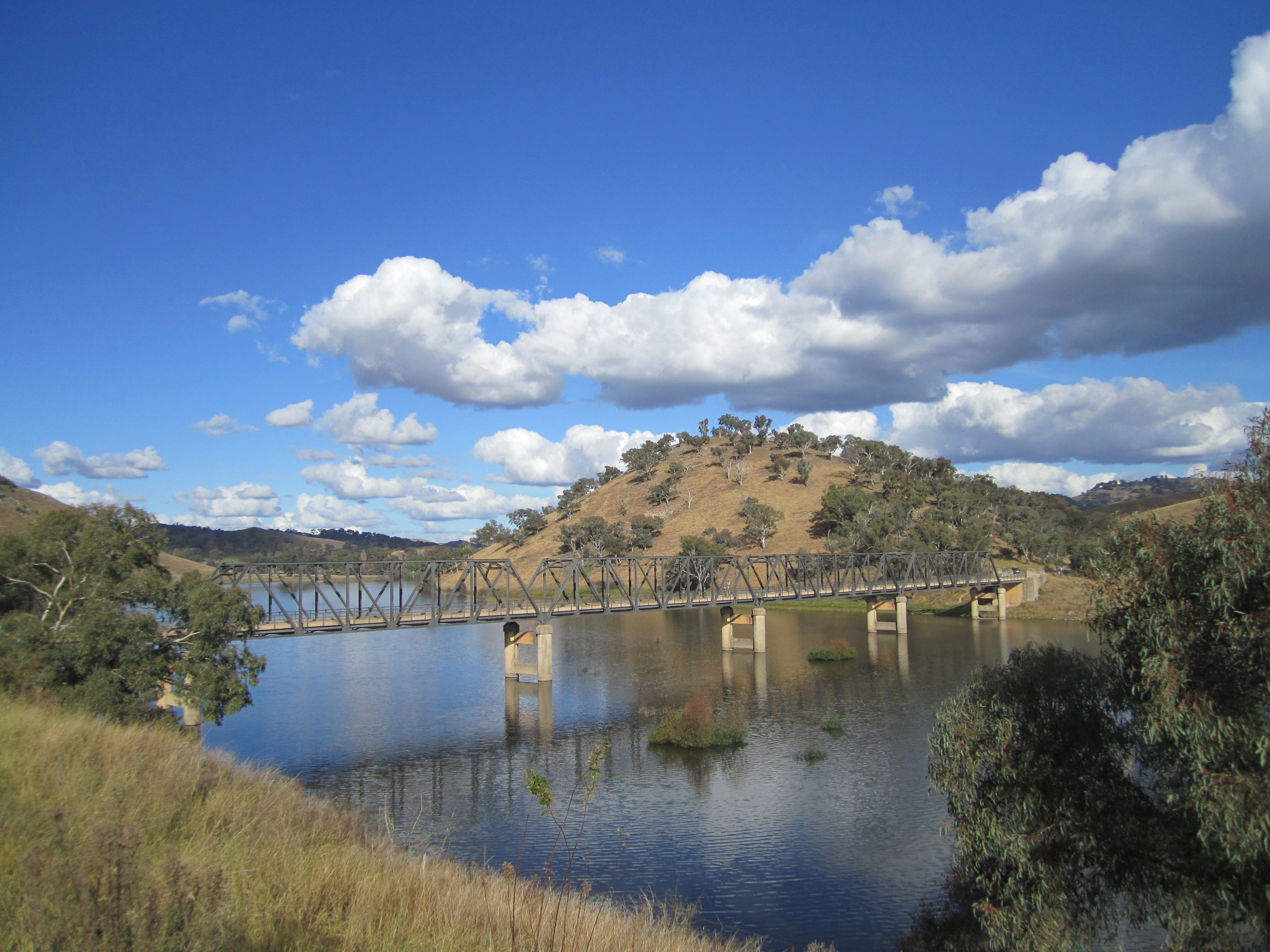
Taemas Bridge across the Murrumbidgee River, 2011

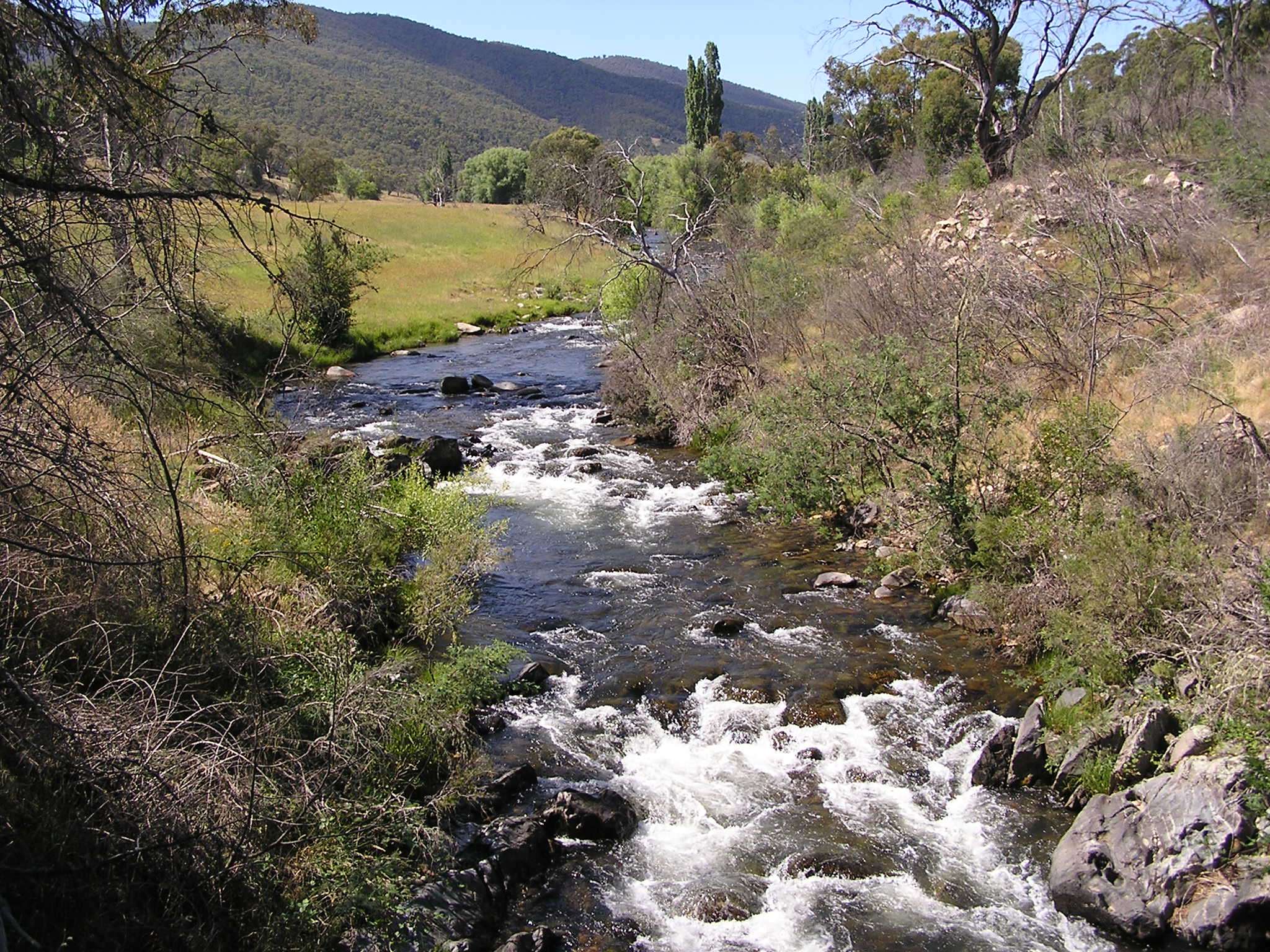
Goodradigbee River in the valley below the Brindabella Ranges, 2005

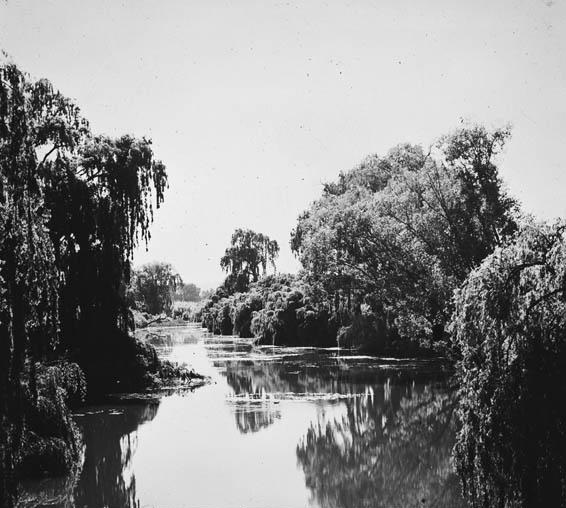
Molonglo River at Acton in 1920, prior to the damming of the river to form Lake Burley Griffin

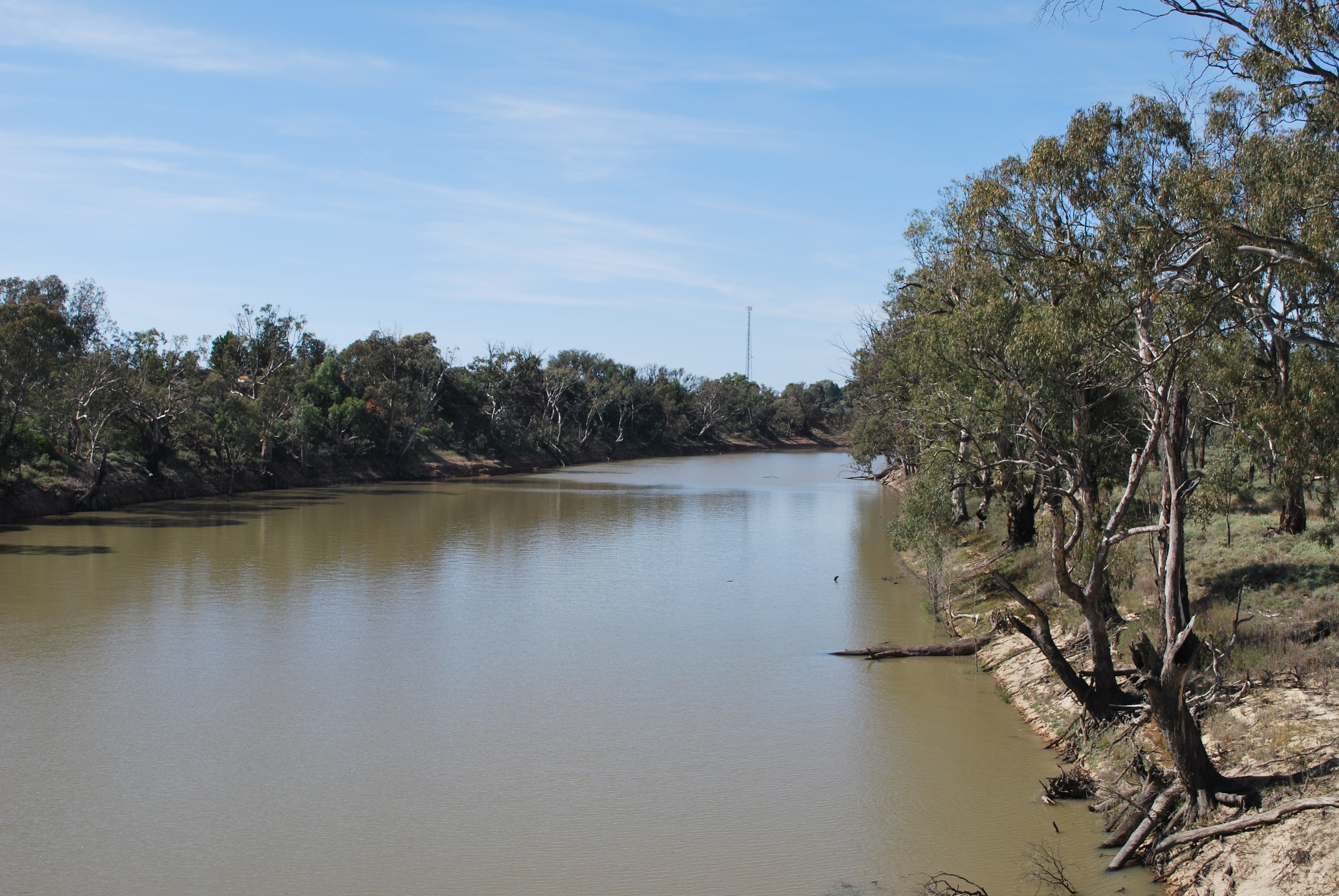
Wakool River, near Kyalite, 2012

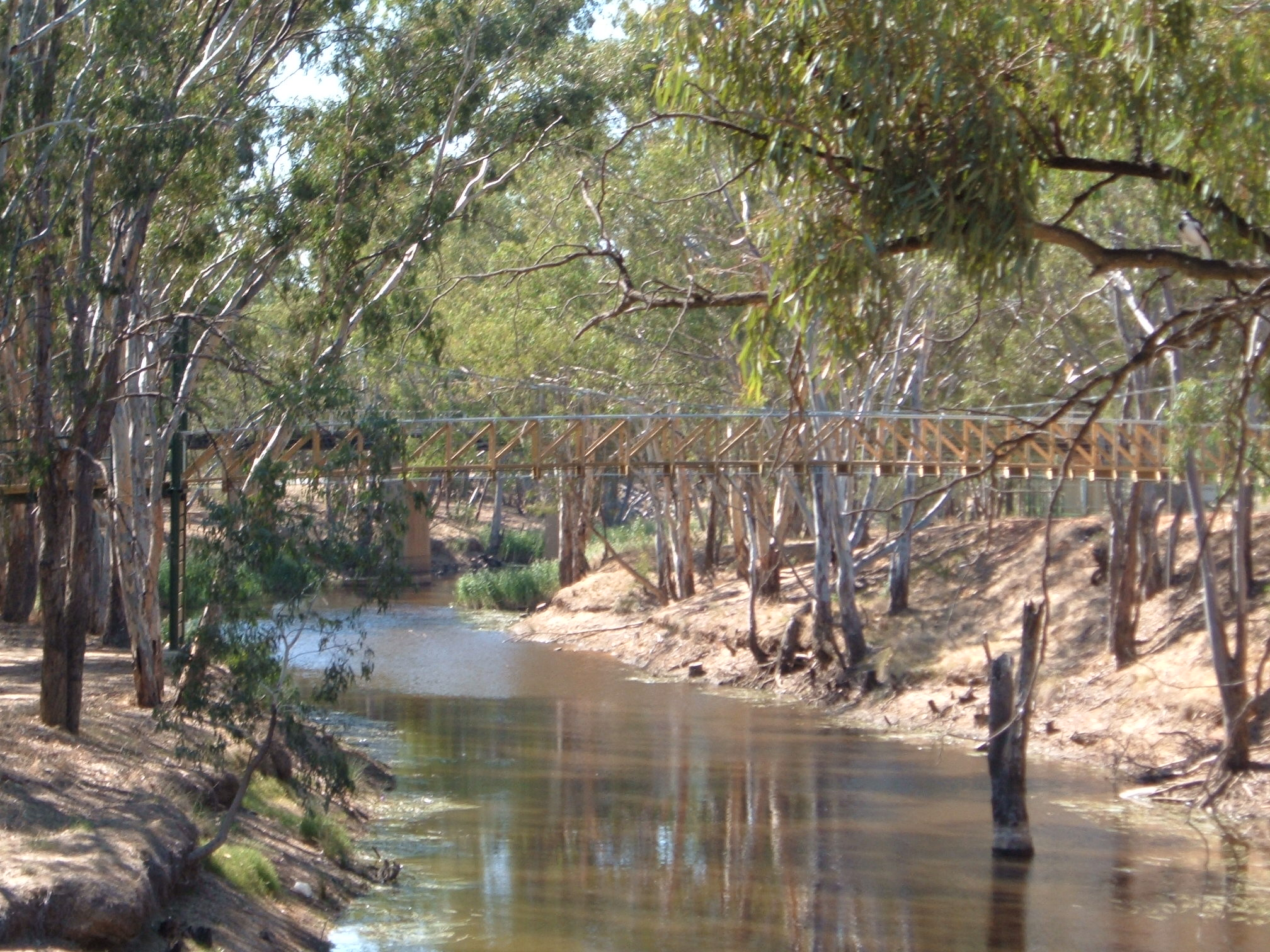
A footbridge of the Avoca River at Charlton, 2005

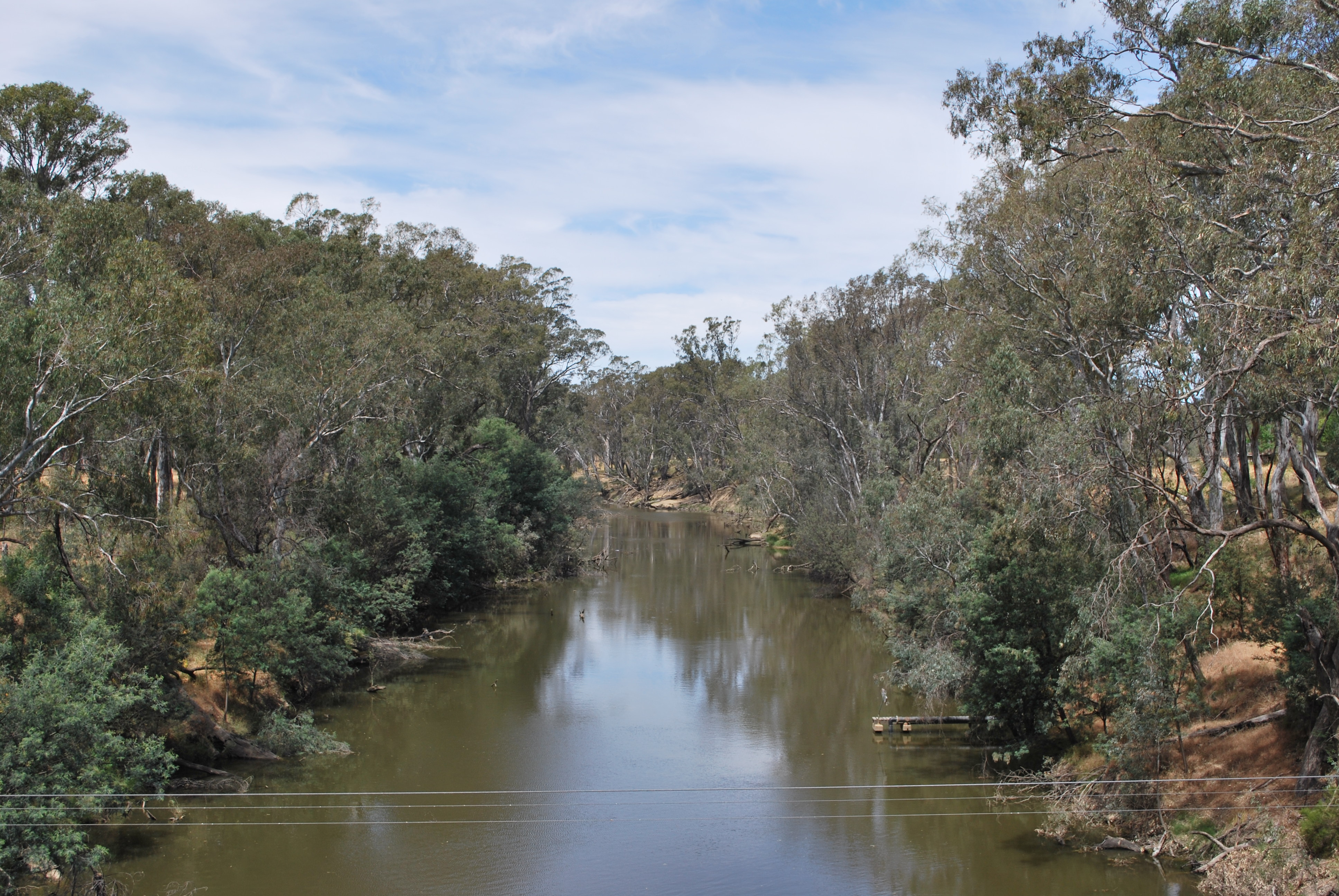
Goulburn River at Murchison, 2009

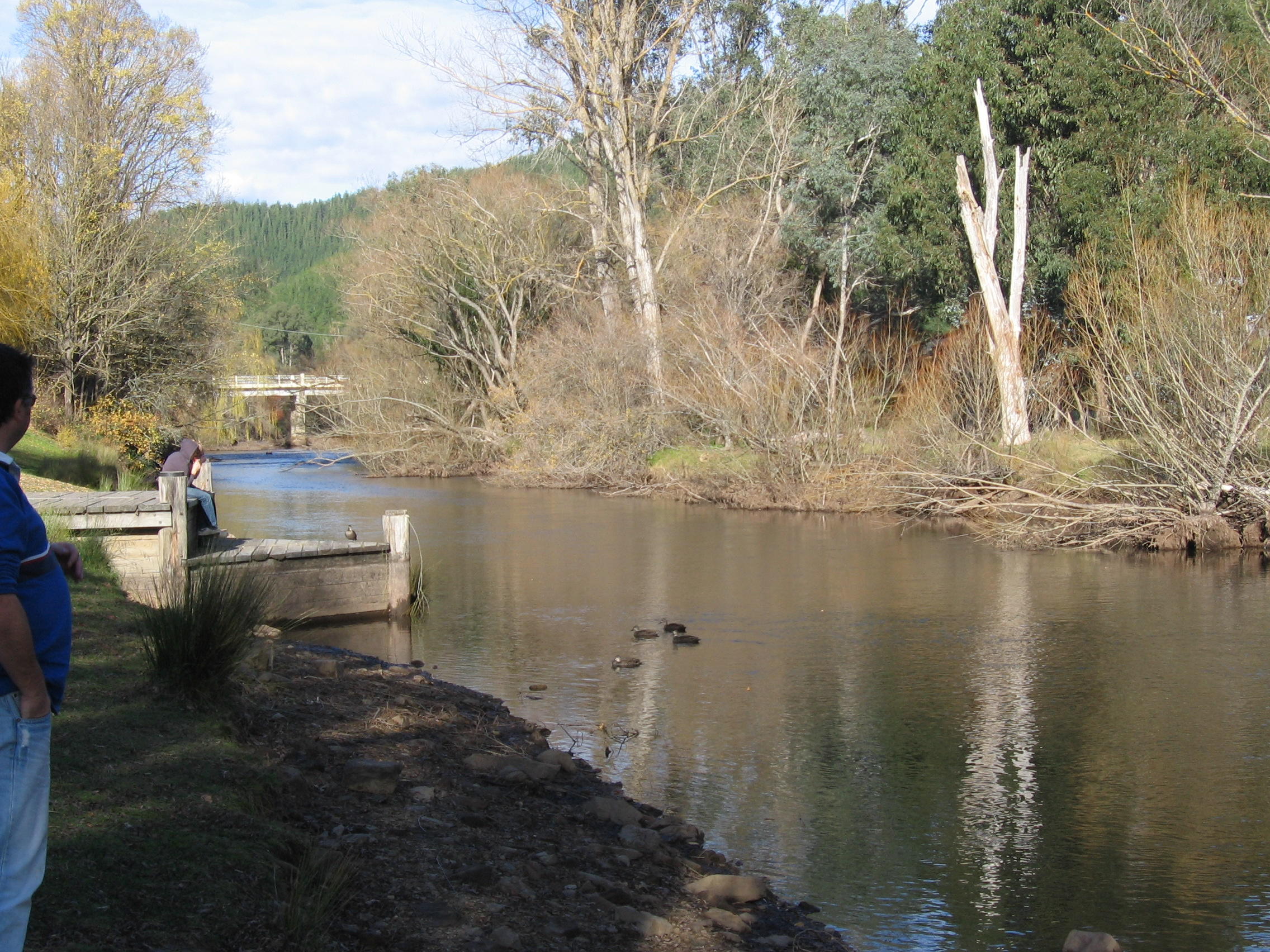
Ovens River at Porepunkah, 2007

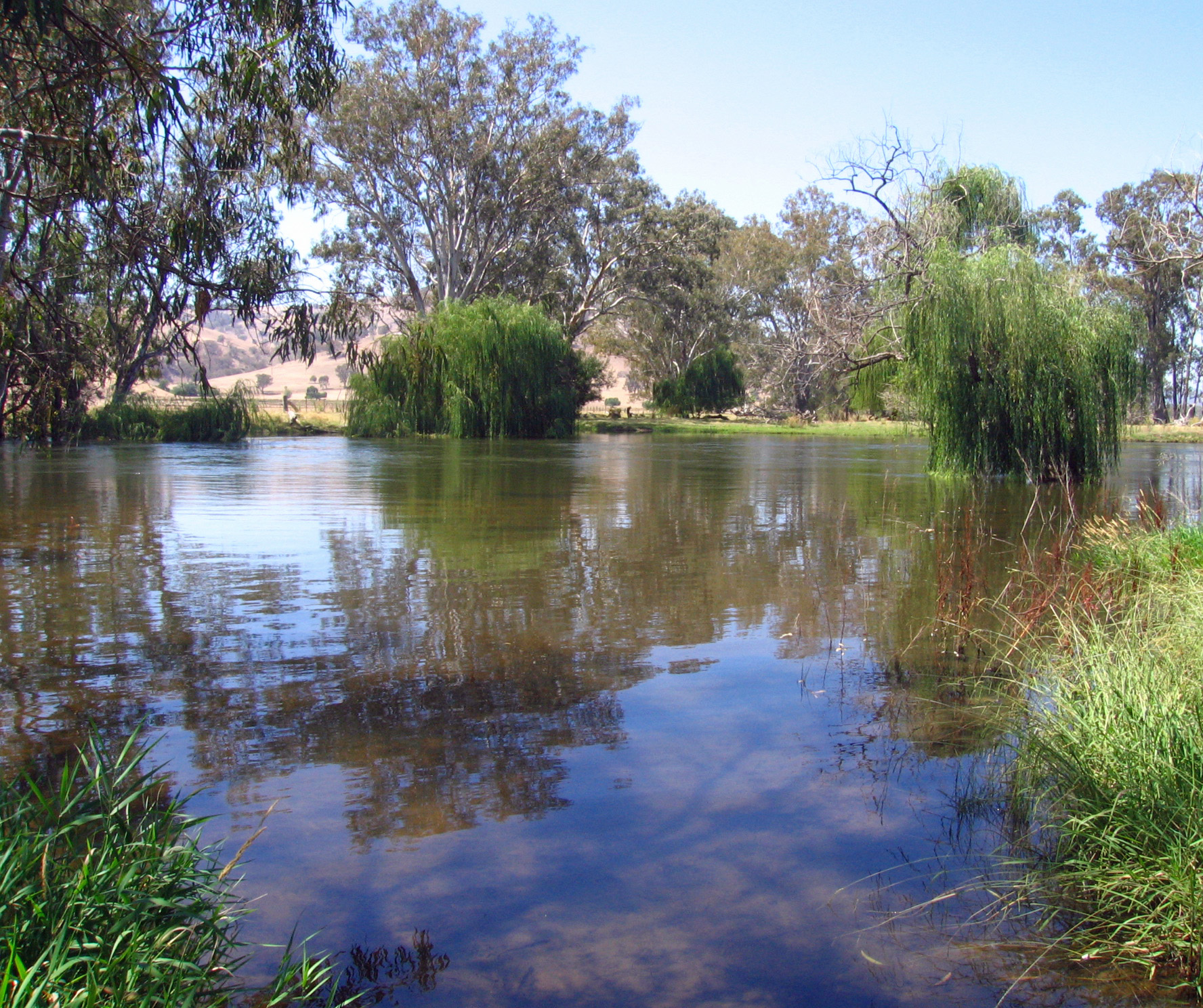
Mitta Mitta River, downstream from Dartmouth Dam, 2007

The rivers listed below comprise the Murray–Darling Basin and its direct significant tributaries, with elevations of their confluence with the downstream river. The tributary with the highest elevation is Swampy Plain River that rises in the Snowy Mountains, below Mount Kosciuszko at an elevation of 2,120 metres (6,960 ft), and ends merging with the Murray River, descending 1,860 metres (6,100 ft).

The ordering of the Basin, from downstream to upstream, is:

Rivers of the Murray–Darling Basin
Catchment river							Elevation at confluence		River mouth	States	River length					
	Tributary						Elevation at confluence		River mouth	States	River length					
		Tributary					Elevation at confluence		River mouth	States	River length					
			Tributary				Elevation at confluence		River mouth	States	River length					
				Tributary			Elevation at confluence		River mouth	States	River length					
					Tributary		Elevation at confluence		River mouth	States	River length					
						Tributary	m	ft	River mouth	States	km	mi				
Murray River							m	ft	0	0	km	mi	Southern Ocean	NSW, Vic, SA	2,375	1,476
	Darling River						35	115	Murray	NSW	1,472	915				
		Paroo River					94	308	Darling	Qld, NSW	1,210	750				
		Warrego River					98	322	Darling	Qld, NSW	1,380	860				
			Langlo River				280	920	Warrego	Qld	440	270				
			Nive River				336	1,102	Warrego	Qld	263	163				
		Culgoa River					109	358	Darling	Qld, NSW	489	304				
			Birrie River				115	377	Culgoa	Qld	197	122				
		Barwon River (New South Wales)					110	360	Darling	NSW	700	430				
			Bokhara River				113	371	Barwon	Qld, NSW	347	216				
			Namoi River				130	430	Barwon	NSW	708	440				
				Mooki River			264	866	Namoi	NSW	128	80				
				Peel River (New South Wales)			286	938	Namoi	NSW	210	130				
					Cockburn River		384	1,260	Peel	NSW	34	21				
				Manilla River			349	1,145	Namoi	NSW	138	86				
				Macdonald River (Bendemeer)			705	2,313	Namoi	NSW	169	105				
					Cobrabald River		990	3,250	Macdonald	NSW	53	33				
			Gwydir River				144	472	Barwon	NSW	488	303				
				Horton River			270	890	Gwydir	NSW	128	80				
				Moredun Creek			645	2,116	Gwydir	NSW	210	130				
				Rocky River (New South Wales)			760	2,490	Gwydir	NSW	138	86				
			Mehi River				145	476	Barwon	NSW	314	195				
			Moonie River				149	489	Barwon	NSW	542	337				
			Boomi River				152	499	Barwon	NSW, Qld	231	144				
			Macquarie River				154	505	Barwon	NSW	960	600				
				Castlereagh River			121	397	Macquarie	NSW	541	336				
				Talbragar River			258	846	Macquarie	NSW	277	172				
					Coolaburragundy River		271	889	Talbragar	NSW	156	97				
				Little River (Dubbo)			271	889	Macquarie	NSW	122	76				
				Bell River (New South Wales)			285	935	Macquarie	NSW	146	91				
				Cudgegong River			342	1,122	Macquarie	NSW	250	160				
				Turon River			406	1,332	Macquarie	NSW	117	73				
					Crudine River		563	1,847	Turon	NSW	54	34				
				Fish River (New South Wales)			668	2,192	Macquarie	NSW	119	74				
					Campbells River		706	2,316	Fish	NSW	82	51				
					Duckmaloi River		1,010	3,310	Fish	NSW	27	17				
			Weir River (Queensland)				166	545	Barwon	Qld, NSW	197	122				
			Balonne River				171	561	Barwon	Qld	479	298				
				Maranoa River			207	679	Balonne	Qld	519	322				
					Merivale River		401	1,316	Maranoa	Qld	205	127				
				Condamine River			256	840	Balonne	Qld	657	408				
			Macintyre River				224	735	Barwon	NSW, Qld	319	198				
				Dumaresq River			227	745	Macintyre	NSW	214	133				
					Macintyre Brook		241	791	Dumaresq	Qld	165	103				
					Beardy River		354	1,161	Dumaresq	NSW	90	56				
					Pike Creek (Queensland)		360	1,180	Dumaresq	Qld	117	73				
					Mole River (New South Wales)		363	1,191	Dumaresq	Qld	73	45				
						Deepwater River	601	1,972	Mole	NSW	84	52				
						Bluff River (New South Wales)	614	2,014	Mole	NSW	13	8.1				
					Severn River (Queensland)		375	1,230	Dumaresq	Qld, NSW	90	56				
				Severn River (New South Wales)			284	932	Macintyre	NSW	52	32				
					Beardy Waters		884	2,900	Severn (NSW)	NSW	70	43				
		Bogan River					111	364	Darling	NSW	617	383				
			Little River (Parkes)				305	1,001	Bogan	NSW	319	198				
	Murrumbidgee River						55	180	Murray	NSW, ACT	1,488	925				
		Lachlan River					68	223	Murrumbidgee	NSW	1,440	890				
			Belubula River				262	860	Lachlan	NSW	165	103				
			Boorowa River				301	988	Lachlan	NSW	134	83				
			Abercrombie River				375	1,230	Lachlan	NSW	130	81				
				Isabella River (New South Wales)			479	1,572	Abercrombie	NSW	51	32				
				Bolong River			589	1,932	Abercrombie	NSW	60	37				
		Tumut River					220	720	Murrumbidgee	NSW	182	113				
			Goobarragandra River				272	892	Tumut	NSW	56	35				
			Doubtful Creek				1,290	4,230	Tumut	NSW	15	9.3				
		Yass River					345	1,132	Murrumbidgee	NSW	139	86				
		Goodradigbee River					345	1,132	Murrumbidgee	NSW	105	65				
		Crookwell River					430	1,410	Murrumbidgee	NSW	78	48				
		Molonglo River					440	1,440	Murrumbidgee	NSW, ACT	115	71				
			Jerrabomberra Creek				554	1,818	Molonglo	NSW, ACT	35	22				
			Sullivans Creek				556	1,824	Molonglo	NSW, ACT	13	8.1				
			Queanbeyan River				567	1,860	Molonglo	NSW, ACT	104	65				
		Cotter River					460	1,510	Murrumbidgee	ACT	74	46				
			Paddys River (Australian Capital Territory)				477	1,565	Cotter	ACT	28	17				
				Tidbinbilla River			618	2,028	Paddys	ACT	13	8.1				
				Gibraltar Creek			647	2,123	Paddys	ACT	13	8.1				
		Gudgenby River					573	1,880	Murrumbidgee	ACT	35	22				
			Naas River				631	2,070	Gudgenby	ACT	26	16				
			Orroral River				842	2,762	Gudgenby	ACT	15	9.3				
		Bredbo River					695	2,280	Murrumbidgee	NSW	52	32				
			Strike-a-Light River				733	2,405	Bredbo	NSW	38	24				
		Numeralla River					706	2,316	Murrumbidgee	NSW	94	58				
			Big Badja River				735	2,411	Numeralla	NSW	32	20				
			Kybeyan River				745	2,444	Numeralla	NSW	36	22				
	Wakool River						58	190	Murray	NSW	363	226				
		Niemur River					63	207	Wakool	NSW	155	96				
	Edward River (an anabranch)						61	200	Murray	NSW	383	238				
	Little Murray River (Victoria)						67	220	Murray	Vic	46	29				
	Loddon River						71	233	Murray	Vic	392	244				
	Avoca River						74	243	Murray	Vic	270	170				
	Little Murray River (New South Wales)						75	246	Murray	NSW	22	14				
	Goulburn River, Victoria						100	330	Murray	Vic	654	406				
		Broken River (Victoria)					118	387	Goulburn	Vic	225	140				
		Yea River					162	531	Goulburn	Vic	122	76				
			Murrindindi River				186	610	Yea	Vic	26	16				
		Acheron River					190	620	Goulburn	Vic	84	52				
			Little River (Cathedral Range)				207	679	Acheron	Vic	22	14				
			Steavenson River				264	866	Acheron	Vic	20	12				
				Taggerty River			368	1,207	Steavenson	Vic	18	11				
		Rubicon River					200	660	Goulburn	Vic	43	27				
			Royston River				381	1,250	Rubicon	Vic	19	12				
		Big River (Goulburn River, Victoria)					259	850	Goulburn	Vic	62	39				
		Delatite River					260	850	Goulburn	Vic	83	52				
		Howqua River					265	869	Goulburn	Vic	66	41				
		Jamieson River					294	965	Goulburn	Vic	33	21				
	Campaspe River						123	404	Murray	Vic	232	144				
		Coliban River					183	600	Campaspe	Vic	89	55				
			Little Coliban River				501	1,644	Coliban	Vic	12	7.5				
	Ovens River						125	410	Murray	Vic	191	119				
		King River, Victoria					142	466	Ovens	Vic	126	78				
		Buffalo River (Victoria)					206	676	Ovens	Vic	65	40				
			Dandongadale River				279	915	Buffalo	Vic	41	25				
			Catherine River (Victoria)				392	1,286	Buffalo	Vic	25	16				
		Buckland River (Victoria)					274	899	Ovens	Vic	38	24				
	Kiewa River						156	512	Murray	Vic, NSW	109	68				
	Mitta Mitta River						180	590	Murray	Vic	204	127				
		Dart River (Victoria)					452	1,483	Mitta Mitta	Vic	29	18				
		Big River (Mitta Mitta River, Victoria)					655	2,149	Mitta Mitta	Vic	52	32				
		Cobungra River					656	2,152	Mitta Mitta	Vic	55	34				
			Victoria River (Victoria)				830	2,720	Cobungra	Vic	25	16				
	Tooma River						238	781	Murray	NSW	74	46				
	Swampy Plain River						269	883	Murray	NSW, Vic	59	37				
		Geehi River					439	1,440	Swampy Plain	Vic	47	29				

== Murray–Darling Basin Initiative ==
=== Background ===
The Basin affects five states and territory governments, which according to the Constitution, are responsible for managing water resources. The River Murray Commission was established in 1917. Under the River Murray Waters Agreement, which did not include Queensland though about a quarter of the Basin lays in the state, the commission was an advisory body with no authority for enforcement of provisions. For a long time the commission was only concerned with water quantity until salinity became a problem. This led to minor reforms in 1982 in which water quality became part of the commission's responsibilities.

However, it was soon recognised that a new organisational structure which considered the national perspective was needed for effective management. The Murray–Darling Basin Agreement was first adopted in 1985 but it was not until 1993 that its full legal status was enacted. The Agreement led to the creation of a number of new organisations under what is known as the Murray–Darling Basin Initiative. These included the Murray–Darling Basin Ministerial Council and the Murray–Darling Basin Commission.

=== Murray–Darling Basin Plan ===
The Murray–Darling Basin Authority (MDBA) was formed in 2008 to manage the Murray–Darling Basin in an integrated and sustainable manner. The MDBA is responsible for preparing and overseeing a legally-enforceable management plan. In October 2010, MDBA released a draft Murray–Darling Basin Plan (MDBP) for consultation. On 22 November 2012, Tony Burke signed the Murray–Darling Basin Plan, which passed the Australian Parliament's disallowance period on 19 March 2013.

==== Community consultation ====
The MDBA's draft Murray–Darling Basin Plan, titled the Guide to the Proposed Murray–Darling Basin Plan, was released in October 2010 as the first part of a three-stage process to address the problems of the Murray–Darling Basin. The Plan was in response to the 2000s Australian drought, and designed to secure the long-term ecological health of the Murray–Darling Basin. This entailed cutting existing water allocations and tree growth environmental flows. The Basin Plan was designed to set environmentally sustainable limits on the quantities of water that may be taken from Basin water resources, to set Basin-wide environmental, water quality and salinity objectives, to develop efficient water trading regimes across the Basin, to set requirements for state water resource plans and to improve water security for all Basin users. It also intends to minimise social and economic impacts whilst achieving the plan's environmental outcomes.

With the release of the Guide to the Proposed Murray–Darling Basin Plan there have been a number of protests and voiced concerns about the plan in rural towns that the MDBA visited to present the plan to consultation meetings. More than 5,000 people attended a MDBA meeting in Griffith where Griffith Mayor, Mike Neville, said the plan would "obliterate" Murrumbidgee valley communities. Other groups also echo this feeling, such as the Victorian Farmers Federation and Wine Group Growers' Australia. Conversely, support for the Murray–Darling Basin plan has been received by various groups, including Australian Conservation Foundation, and Environment Victoria.

New legal advice from Commonwealth government lawyers is changing the plan. The Government's interpretation is that the plan must give equal weight to the environmental, social, and economic impacts of proposed cuts to irrigation.

Environmentalists and South Australian irrigators, at the end of the river in South Australia, say that the authority should stick to its original figure.

In October 2010, a parliamentary inquiry into the economic impacts of the plan was announced.

In late October 2010 the Water Minister, Tony Burke, played down the prospect of a High Court challenge to the Murray–Darling Basin plan, as confusion continued over new legal advice released by the Government. In response to community concerns that MDBA had put environmental issues first over social and economic needs, Burke released new advice on the requirements of the Water Act. Burke stated that the Act does allow for the authority to "optimise" the needs of all three areas, but constitutional lawyer, George Williams, had cast doubts over the interpretation of the laws, stating it could be subject to a legal challenge.

The MDBA announced in November 2010 that it might be forced to push back the release of its final plan for the river system until early 2012.

The then MDBA chairman, Mike Taylor, reassured the public meeting that more work is being done to look at how the proposed cuts would affect regional communities. He stated: "Importantly, we want to make sure the social and economic impacts—which under any sort of scenario is very significant—were fully teased out". Taylor resigned as he allegedly believed that the overriding principle should be the environmental outcome which was in conflict with the Gillard Government and following a period of sustained criticism of the Authority and the implementation of the proposed draft Basin plan. He was replaced by former New South Wales Planning Minister, Craig Knowles.

In late May 2012, the revised plan was forwarded to state water ministers. It did not alter the recommendation to cut 2,750 gigalitres (2.75 km^{3}; 2,230,000 acre⋅ft) of water entitlements.

Following much negotiation between the Commonwealth and State governments and numerous submissions from interested stakeholders and the community, the Basin Plan became law in November 2012 and can now be implemented.

== See also ==
- Climate change in Australia
- Drought in Australia
- Murray–Darling Cap
- List of drainage basins of Australia
- List of Darling River distances
- List of Murray River crossings
- List of Murray River distances
- List of Murrumbidgee River distances
- Murray Basin, the geological sedimentary basin
