= Severn River railway bridge, Dundee =

Dundee rail bridge over Severn River
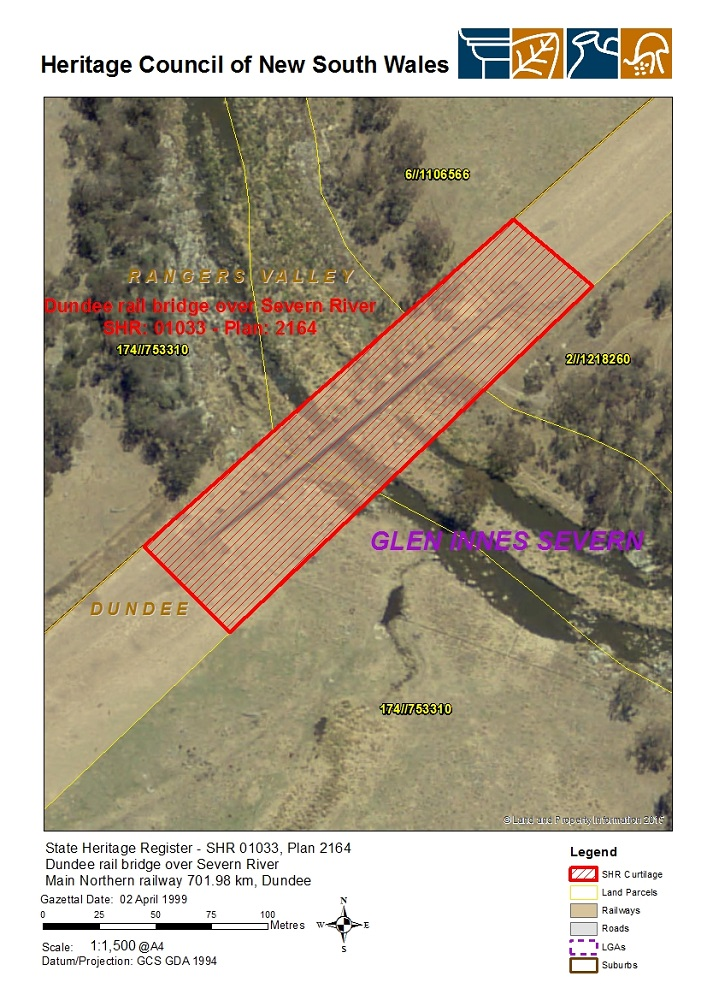
- Heritage boundaries
- Coordinates: 29°34′55″S 151°48′10″E
- Carries: Main North Line
- Crosses: Severn River
- Locale: Dundee, Glen Innes Severn, New South Wales, Australia
- Other name: Severn River Railway Viaduct
- Owner: Transport Asset Manager of New South Wales

Characteristics
- Design: Queen post truss bridge
- Material: Timber
- Longest span: 12 metres (40 ft)
- No. of spans: 13

Rail characteristics
- Track gauge: 4 ft 8 1/2 in (1,435 mm) standard gauge

History
- Engineering design by: John Whitton
- Construction end: 1886

New South Wales Heritage Register
- Official name: Dundee rail bridge over Severn River; Severn River Railway Viaduct
- Type: State heritage (built)
- Designated: 2 April 1999
- Reference no.: 1033
- Type: Railway Bridge/Viaduct
- Category: Transport – Rail
- Builders: Main Contractor for the Glen Innes to Tenterfield section

Location
- Interactive map of Dundee rail bridge over Severn River

The Severn River railway bridge is a heritage-listed railway bridge that carries the Main Northern Line across the Severn River at Dundee, Glen Innes Severn, New South Wales, Australia. It was designed by John Whitton in his capacity as Engineer-in-Chief for Railways and built in 1886. It is also known as Severn River Railway Viaduct. The property is owned by Transport Asset Manager of New South Wales, an agency of the Government of New South Wales. It was added to the New South Wales State Heritage Register on 2 April 1999.

== History ==
When John Whitton, Engineer-in-Chief for Railways 1856–1890, extended the Main North Railway from Muswellbrook to Glen Innes, 1870–1884 it climbed through the highest parts of the Great Dividing Range into the New England Region. Gradients were steep, curves were sharp, there was heavy earthworks and some major iron lattice bridges. It was expensive railway construction.

When the section from Glen Innes to Tenterfield was planned, economies were made, particularly with bridges. They had to be timber, mostly ballast top timber beam bridges but at three locations larger bridges were required, over the Beardy Waters, Severn River and Bluff River.

Whitton, a successful railway engineer from England, chose one of Isambard Kingdom Brunel's timber bridge viaducts built in Cornwall during the 1850s. The model chosen was the St Germans Viaduct, composed of composite deck Queen post trusses, with the bottom chords being large iron rods. Whitton's staff redesigned the trusses to be all timber and the viaducts were built during construction of the Glen Innes to Tenterfield section 1884–86.

The final section to Wallangarra (1888) was mostly easier over plateau country but the crossing of Tenterfield Creek required a large bridge and a timber Queen post truss viaduct was built there also, the fourth between Glen Innes and the Queensland border.

All four viaducts retain their original fabric.

Only two other such timber viaducts were built in this period, the Ingalara Creek railway bridge and the Bredbo River railway bridge on the Bombala railway line.

== Description ==
Located 701.98 kilometres (436.19 mi) from Central station, the Severn River bridge is a 13-span timber truss viaduct; each span is 12 metres (40 ft) centre-to-centre of timber trestles.

The trusses are deck Queen post copied from one of Brunel's Cornish timber bridges (St Germans), built about 30 years earlier.

The condition of the bridge was assessed as fair as at 16 March 2006 due to lack of maintenance since rail services were suspended.

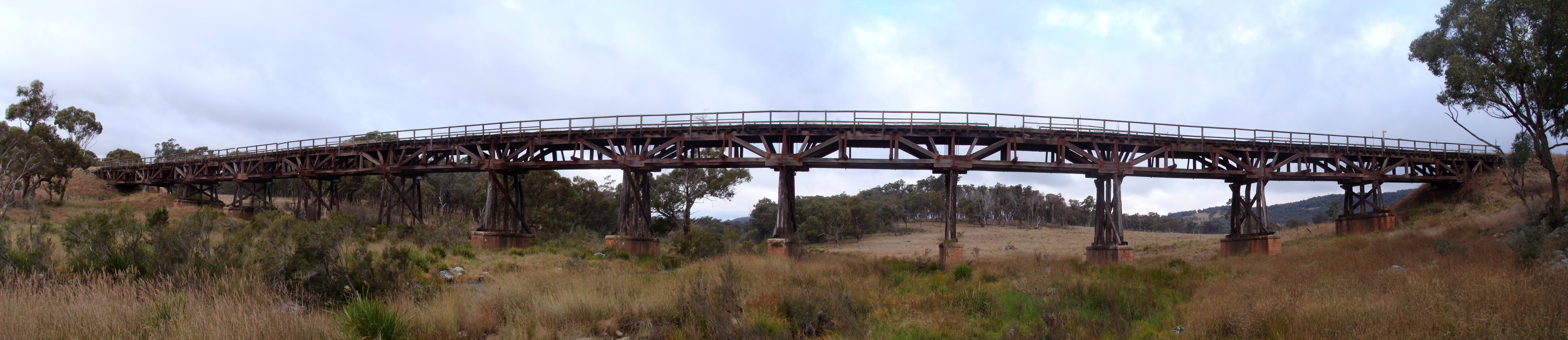
Severn River Bridge

== Heritage listing ==
The Severn River railway bridge was listed on the New South Wales State Heritage Register on 2 April 1999 having satisfied the following criteria.

The place is important in demonstrating the course, or pattern, of cultural or natural history in New South Wales.

The timber Queen post truss viaduct was an economic bridge for the Glen Innes to Wallangarra Railway at a time when the boom years of the 1880s was ending and funding for railway construction was decreasing.

The place has strong or special association with a particular community or cultural group in New South Wales for social, cultural or spiritual reasons.

The Main North Railway made a significant contribution to the development of the New England Region from the time of its construction 1882–88, and the four timber viaducts were important items of the railway's infrastructure.

The place has potential to yield information that will contribute to an understanding of the cultural or natural history of New South Wales.

The timber Queen post deck viaduct was a significant structure in place of the expensive iron lattice bridges preferred by John Whitton. The viaducts were technically sound and durable, having been built from renowned ironbark hardwood.

The place possesses uncommon, rare or endangered aspects of the cultural or natural history of New South Wales.

These four viaducts and the two on the Cooma Line are the only ones of their type built. They are a unique class of railway bridge.

== See also ==
- List of railway bridges in New South Wales
