= Yarraford Rail Bridge over Beardy Waters =

Yarraford rail bridge
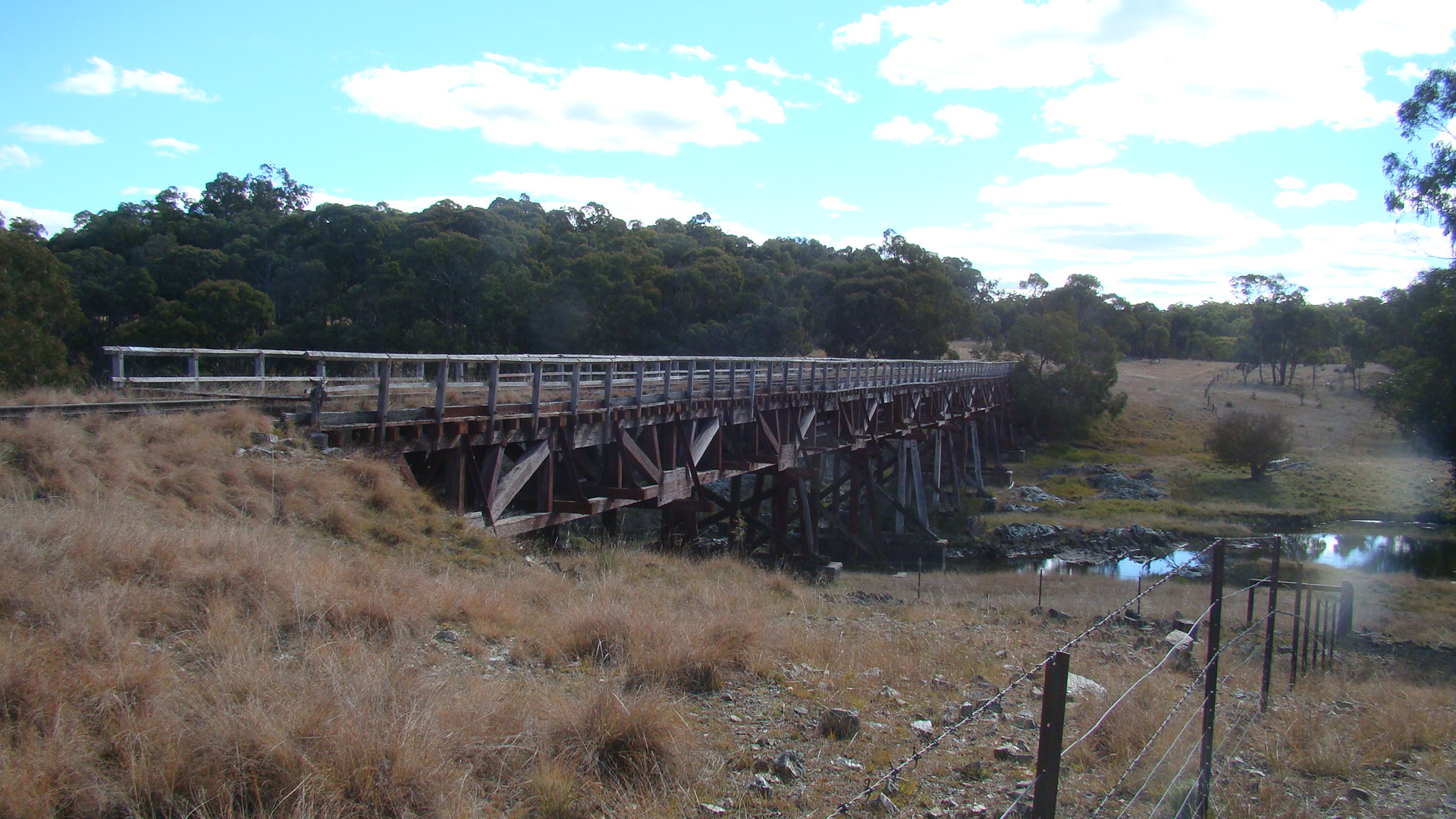
- The Yarraford rail bridge, in 2011
- Coordinates: 29°38′16″S 151°46′51″E
- Carries: Main Northern Line
- Crosses: Beardy Waters
- Locale: Glen Innes, Glen Innes Severn, New South Wales, Australia
- Other name: Beardy River Railway Viaduct
- Owner: Transport Asset Manager of New South Wales

Characteristics
- Design: Queen post truss
- Material: Timber
- Longest span: 12 metres (40 ft)
- No. of spans: 9

Rail characteristics
- Track gauge: 4 ft 8 1/2 in (1,435 mm) standard gauge

History
- Engineering design by: John Whitton
- Construction start: 1884
- Construction end: 1886

New South Wales Heritage Register
- Official name: Yarraford rail bridge over Beardy River; Beardy River Railway Viaduct
- Type: State heritage (built)
- Designated: 2 April 1999
- Reference no.: 01068
- Type: Railway Bridge/Viaduct
- Category: Transport – Rail

Location
- Interactive map of Yarraford rail bridge

The Yarraford Rail Bridge is a heritage-listed closed railway bridge that carried the Main Northern Line across Beardy Waters, situated 694.371 kilometres (431.462 mi) from Central station, near Glen Innes, in the Glen Innes Severn local government area of New South Wales, Australia. The bridge was designed by John Whitton in his capacity as Engineer-in-Chief for Railways and built in 1886. It is also known as Beardy River Railway Viaduct. The property is owned by Transport Asset Manager of New South Wales, an agency of the Government of New South Wales. It was added to the New South Wales State Heritage Register on 2 April 1999.

== History ==
When John Whitton, Engineer-in-Chief for Railways 1856–1890, extended the Main North Railway from Muswellbrook to Glen Innes between 1870–1884 it climbed through the highest parts of the Great Dividing Range into the New England Region. Gradients were steep, curves were sharp, there was heavy earthworks and some major iron lattice bridges. It was expensive railway construction.

When the section from Glen Innes to Tenterfield was planned, economies were made, particularly with bridges. They had to be timber, mostly ballast top timber beam bridges but at three locations larger bridges were required, over Beardy Waters, and the Severn River and Bluff River.

Whitton, a successful railway engineer from England, chose the design of one of Isambard Kingdom Brunel's timber bridge viaducts built in Cornwall during the 1850s. The model chosen was the St Germans Viaduct composed of composite deck Queen post trusses, with the bottom chords being large iron rods. Whitton's staff redesigned the trusses to be all timber and the viaducts were built during construction of the Glen Innes to Tenterfield section 1884-86.

The final section to Wallangarra (1888) was mostly easier over plateau country but the crossing of Tenterfield Creek required a large bridge and a timber Queen post truss viaduct was built there also, the fourth between Glen Innes and the Queensland border.

Only two other such timber viaducts were built in this period, the Ingalara Creek railway bridge and the Bredbo River railway bridge on the Bombala railway line.

== Description ==
The bridge is a nine-span timber truss viaduct. Each span is 12 metres (40 ft), centre-to-centre, of timber trestles.

The trusses are deck Queen post copied from one of Brunel's Cornish timber bridges (St Germans), built about 30 years earlier.

The condition was assessed as fair as at 5 April 2006, having declined due to lack of maintenance since rail services were suspended. As with the other four viaducts on this section of line, it retains its original fabric.

== Heritage listing ==
Yarraford Rail Bridge was listed on the New South Wales State Heritage Register on 2 April 1999.

== See also ==
- List of railway bridges in New South Wales
