= Tenterfield Creek railway bridge, Sunnyside =

Tenterfield Creek railway bridge, Sunnyside (former)
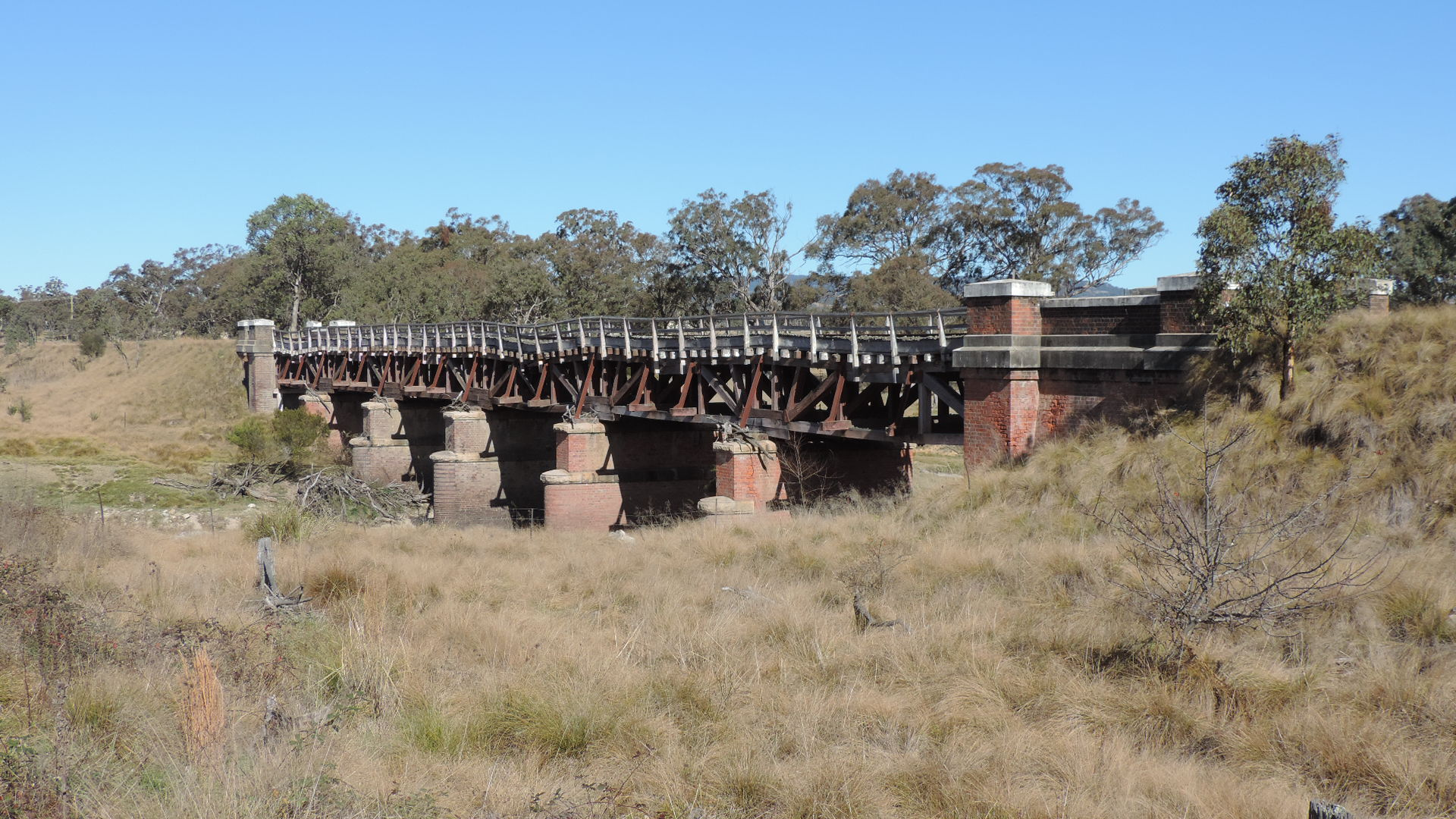
- Sunnyside rail bridge over Tenterfield Creek, 2015
- Coordinates: 28°59′07″S 151°56′57″E
- Carries: Main North Line
- Crosses: Tenterfield Creek
- Locale: Tenterfield, Tenterfield Shire, New South Wales, Australia
- Begins: Sunnyside
- Ends: Jennings
- Other name: Sunnyside rail bridge over Tenterfield Creek
- Owner: Transport Asset Manager of New South Wales

Characteristics
- Design: Queen post truss
- Material: Timber
- Pier construction: Brick
- No. of spans: 6

Rail characteristics
- No. of tracks: One
- Track gauge: 4 ft 8 1/2 in (1,435 mm) standard gauge

History
- Engineering design by: John Whitton; Engineer-in-Chief for Railways
- Construction end: 1888
- Closed: c. 2007

New South Wales Heritage Register
- Official name: Sunnyside rail bridge over Tenterfield Creek
- Type: State heritage (built)
- Designated: 2 April 1999
- Reference no.: 1056
- Type: Railway Bridge/Viaduct
- Category: Transport – Rail

Location
- Interactive map of Tenterfield Creek railway bridge, Sunnyside (former)

The Tenterfield Creek railway bridge is a heritage-listed former railway bridge that carried the Main North Line across the Tenterfield Creek from Sunnyside (a rural place in north-west Tenterfield) to Jennings, both in the Tenterfield Shire local government area of New South Wales, Australia. It was designed by John Whitton and Engineer-in-Chief for NSW Government Railways and built in 1888. The bridge is also known as the Sunnyside rail bridge over Tenterfield Creek. The property is owned by Transport Asset Manager of New South Wales, an agency of the Government of New South Wales and was added to the New South Wales State Heritage Register on 2 April 1999.

== History ==
When John Whitton, Engineer-in-Chief for Railways 1856–1890, extended the Main North railway line from Muswellbrook to Glen Innes, 1870–1884 it climbed through the highest parts of the Great Dividing Range into the New England Region. Gradients were steep, curves were sharp, there was heavy earthworks and some major iron lattice bridges. It was expensive railway construction.

So when the section from Glen Innes to Tenterfield was planned, economies were made, particularly with bridges. They had to be timber, mostly ballast top timber beam bridges but at three locations larger bridges were required, over Beardy Waters, Severn and Bluff rivers.

Whitton, a successful railway engineer from England, chose one of the famous I. K. Brunel's timber bridge viaducts built in Cornwall during the 1850s. The model chosen was the St Germans Viaduct composed of composite deck Queen post trusses, the bottom chords were large iron rods. Whitton's staff redesigned the trusses to be all timber and the viaducts were built during construction of the Glen Innes to Tenterfield section 1884–86.

The final section to Wallangarra, 1888, was mostly easier over plateau country but the crossing of Tenterfield Creek required a large bridge and a timber Queen post truss viaduct was built there also, the fourth between Glen Innes and the Queensland border.

Only two other such timber viaducts were built in this period, on the Bombala railway line over Ingalara Creek and the Bredbo River, see separate inventories.

Former railways chief David Hill called the old Great Northern line that first linked Sydney and Brisbane the most important stretch of heritage track in the country.

The Queenslander reached Wallangarra with their line in 1887. The NSW line came north from Tenterfield in 1888, but because the two systems used different track gauges, passengers had to change trains at Wallangarra's unique railway station.

In 1930 a standard gauge track was completed all the way to Brisbane via Kyogle and the Great Northern Railway started to go into decline. The last passenger services went north to Wallangarra in 1972 and to Tenterfield, 20 kilometres (12 mi) further south, in 1989. These days the New South Wales section of the line runs from Sydney - Armidale.

== Description ==
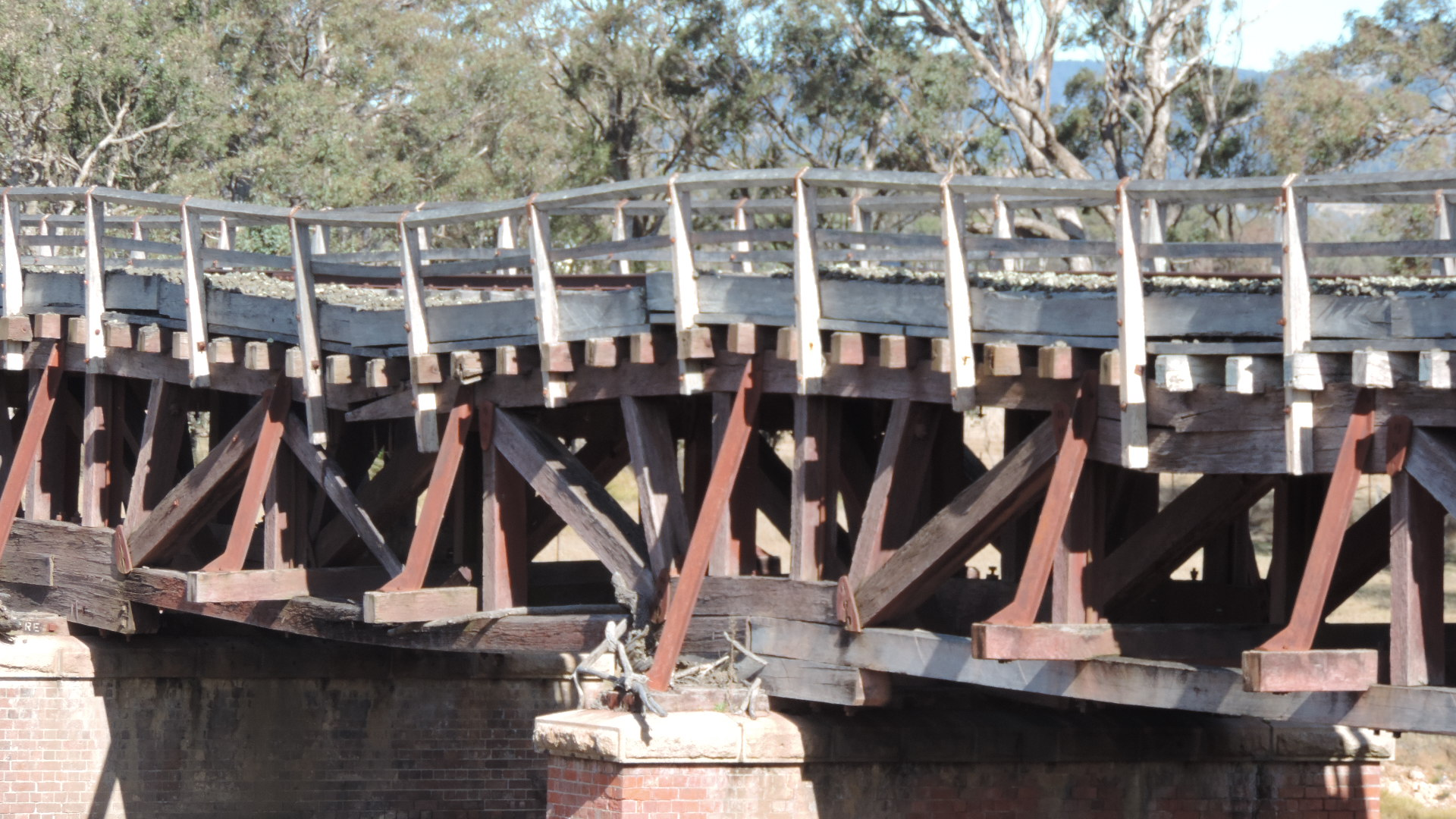
Bridge in poor repair, 2015

The single 4 ft 8 1/2 in (1,435 mm) standard gauge railway bridge is located 784.233 kilometres (487.300 mi) from Central Sydney railway station or 12 kilometres (7.5 mi) north of Tenterfield. The six-span timber truss viaduct bridge has a 12-metre (40 ft) span centre to centre of timber trestles. The Queen post trusses are deck Queen post copied from one of I. K. Brunel's Cornish timber bridges, the one called St Germans viaduct, built about 30 years earlier.

=== Condition ===
As at 22 June 2007, the condition of the bridge is fair only due to lack of maintenance since rail services were suspended. In April 2007 it was reported that conditions were very critical, with remedial action being needed urgently, for public safety alone. Both ends of the bridge have now been fenced off to prevent pedestrian access due to safety concerns.

=== Modifications and dates ===
Between Tamworth and Wallangarra the track is little changed from what was originally built under the guidance of John Whitton. Virtually none of the original tunnels, bridges and station buildings have been replaced. But much of the track has long been derelict.

== Heritage listing ==
As at 4 April 2006, the timber Queen post truss viaduct was an economic bridge for the Glen Innes to Wallangarra Railway at a time when the boom years of the 1880s was ending and funding for railway construction was decreasing. Despite a degree of inaccessibility, the timber viaducts over the Beardy, Severn and Bluff rivers are impressive structures within their rural landscapes. At Tenterfield the adjacent New England Highway provides easy viewing of the forth such viaduct. There are also two more on the Bombala railway line.

The Main North Railway made a significant contribution to the development of the New England Region from the time of its construction 1882–88, and the four timber viaducts were important items of the railway's infrastructure. The timber Queen post deck viaduct was a significant structure in place of the expensive iron lattice bridges preferred by John Whitton. The viaducts were technically sound and durable, having been built from renowned ironbark hardwood. They are a unique class of railway bridge.

The Sunnyside rail bridge over Tenterfield Creek was listed on the New South Wales State Heritage Register on 2 April 1999 having satisfied the following criteria.

The place is important in demonstrating the course, or pattern, of cultural or natural history in New South Wales.

The timber Queen post truss viaduct was an economic bridge for the Glen Innes to Wallangarra Railway at a time when the boom years of the 1880s was ending and funding for railway construction was decreasing.

The place has a strong or special association with a person, or group of persons, of importance of cultural or natural history of New South Wales's history.

This item is assessed as historically significant due to its association with the early expansion of the NSW railways to colonial borders during John Whitton's tenure as Engineer-in-Chief.

The place is important in demonstrating aesthetic characteristics and/or a high degree of creative or technical achievement in New South Wales.

Despite a degree of inaccessibility, the timber viaducts over the Beardy, Severn and Bluff Rivers are structures within their rural landscapes.

The place has a strong or special association with a particular community or cultural group in New South Wales for social, cultural or spiritual reasons.

The Main North Railway made a significant contribution to the development of the New England Region from the time of its construction 1882–88, and the four timber viaducts were important items of the railway's infrastructure.

The place has potential to yield information that will contribute to an understanding of the cultural or natural history of New South Wales.

The timber Queen post deck viaduct was a significant structure in place of the expensive iron lattice bridges preferred by John Whitton. The viaducts were technically sound and durable, having been built from renowned ironbark hardwood.

The place possesses uncommon, rare or endangered aspects of the cultural or natural history of New South Wales.

Sunnyside is one of four viaducts and the two on the Bombala railway line are the only ones of their type built. They are a unique class of railway bridge.

== See also ==
- Sunnyside railway station, New South Wales
- List of railway bridges in New South Wales
