= Ingalara Creek railway bridge, Colinton =

Ingalara Creek railway bridge
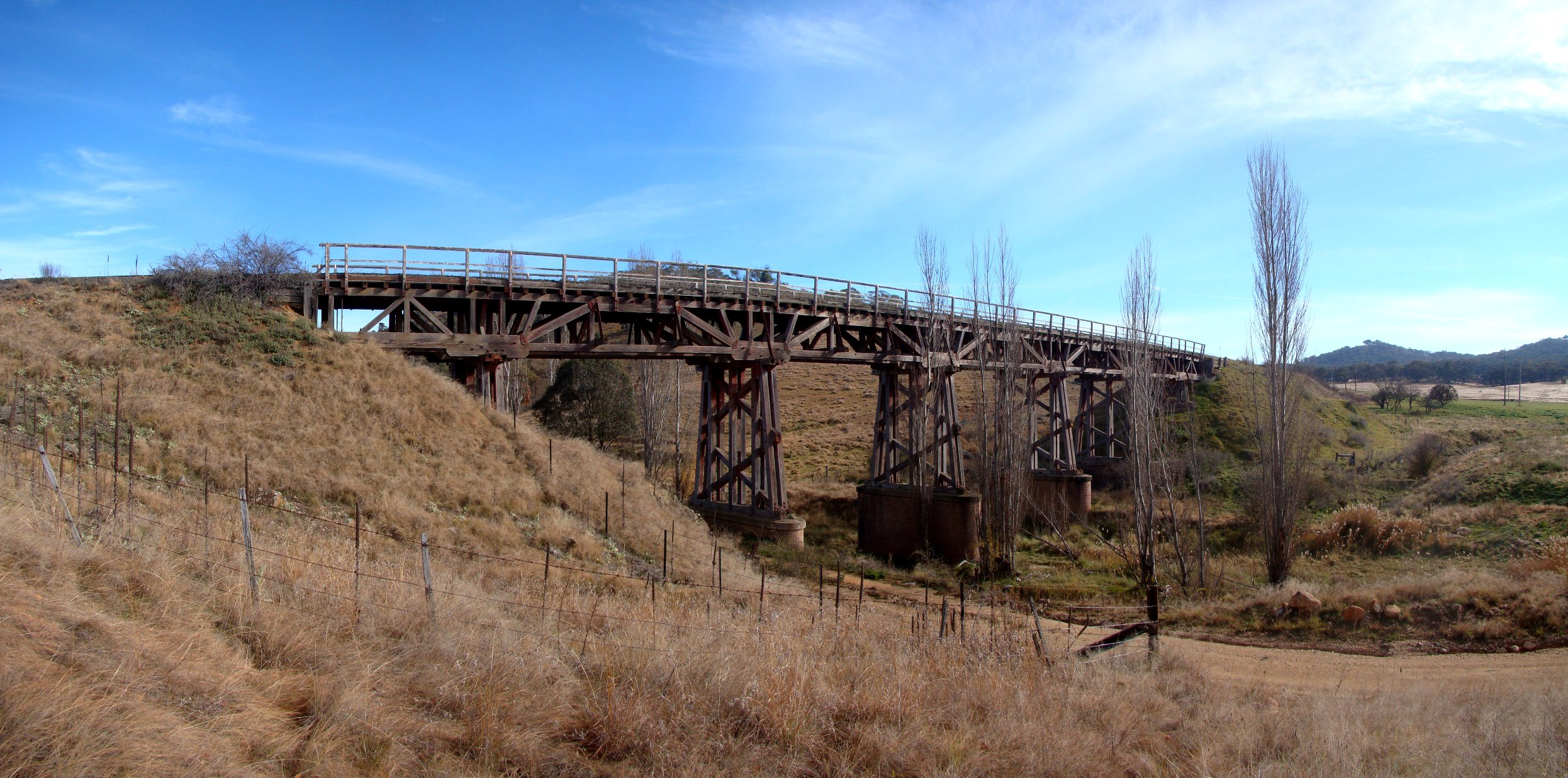
- Coordinates: 35°49′07″S 149°10′36″E
- Carries: Bombala railway line
- Crosses: Ingalara Creek
- Locale: Michelago, Monaro region, New South Wales, Australia
- Owner: Transport Asset Manager of New South Wales

Characteristics
- Design: Queen post truss viaduct
- Material: Timber
- Longest span: 12.8 metres (42 ft)
- No. of spans: 5 by 42ft, 2 by 20ft
- Piers in water: 0

Rail characteristics
- Track gauge: 4 ft 8 1/2 in (1,435 mm) standard gauge

History
- Designer: John Whitton
- Constructed by: NSW Government Railways
- Construction end: 1889

New South Wales Heritage Register
- Official name: Michelago rail bridge over Ingalara Creek; Ingalara Creek Railway Viaduct
- Designated: 2 April 1999
- Reference no.: 1048

Location
- Interactive map of Ingalara Creek railway bridge

The Ingalara Creek railway bridge is a heritage-listed disused railway bridge that carried the Bombala railway line across Ingalara Creek near Michelago in the Monaro region of New South Wales, Australia. It was designed by John Whitton in his capacity as Engineer-in-Chief for Railways and built in 1889. It is also known as the Michelago Rail Bridge over Ingalara Creek and the Ingalara Creek Railway Viaduct. The property is owned by Transport Asset Manager of New South Wales, an agency of the Government of New South Wales. It was added to the New South Wales State Heritage Register on 2 April 1999. On 1 December 2020, changes were made to exemptions relating to the bridge's heritage status.

== History ==
The railway was extended from Queanbeyan to Cooma in 1887–89. At that time, the Engineer-in-Chief for Railways, John Whitton, was under government pressure to reduce construction costs. One common method was to build timber bridges, mostly ballast top timber beam bridges. However, for two major waterways, Ingalara Creek and Bredbo River (Bredbo Rail Bridge) he chose to use Queen post deck trusses, a type of timber truss viaduct that he had already used on the Main North line between Glen Innes and Wallangarra. Nearer to Cooma, at Chakola, he chose a different type of timber viaduct to cross Numeralla River (formerly known as Umaralla River). Several of Whitton's other Queen post deck truss bridges – the Beardy Waters, Severn River and Bluff River viaducts and the Tenterfield Creek bridge – are also heritage-listed.

== Description ==
The Michelago Rail Bridge over Ingalara Creek is a seven-span timber truss viaduct. Each main span is 12.8 metres (42 ft) centre-to-centre of timber trestles.

The trusses are deck Queen post copied from one of Isambard Kingdom Brunel's Cornish timber bridges, called St Germans viaduct, built about 30 years earlier.

The condition was reported to be fair as at 4 April 2006 due to a lack of maintenance since rail services were suspended.

All these viaducts retain their original fabric.

== Heritage listing ==
The timber Queen post truss viaduct was an economic bridge for the Queanbeyan to Cooma Railway at a time when the boom years of the 1880s were ending and funding for railway construction was decreasing. The Ingalara viaduct is accessible from the Monaro Highway and is an impressive timber structure. The Cooma Railway made a significant contribution to the development of the Monaro Region from the time of its construction 1887–89, and all the timber viaducts were important items of the railway's infrastructure. The timber Queen post deck viaduct was a significant structure in place of the expensive iron lattice bridges preferred by John Whitton. The Ingalara viaduct was technically sound and durable, having been built from renowned ironbark hardwood. The two deck Queen post truss timber viaducts on the Cooma Line, together with four on the Main North Line, are a unique class of railway bridge.

Michelago rail bridge over Ingalara Creek was listed on the New South Wales State Heritage Register on 2 April 1999 having satisfied the following criteria.

The place is important in demonstrating the course, or pattern, of cultural or natural history in New South Wales.

The timber Queen post truss viaduct was an economic bridge for the Queanbeyan to Cooma Railway at a time when the boom years of the 1880s was ending and funding for railway construction was decreasing.

The place is important in demonstrating aesthetic characteristics and/or a high degree of creative or technical achievement in New South Wales.

The viaduct is accessible from the Monaro Highway and is an impressive timber structure.

The place has a strong or special association with a particular community or cultural group in New South Wales for social, cultural or spiritual reasons.

The Cooma Railway made a significant contribution to the development of the Monaro Region from the time of its construction 1887–89, and the three timber viaducts were important items of the railway's infrastructure.

The place has potential to yield information that will contribute to an understanding of the cultural or natural history of New South Wales.

The timber Queen post deck viaduct was a significant structure in place of the expensive iron lattice bridges preferred by John Whitton. The Ingalara viaduct was technically sound and durable, having been built from renowned ironbark hardwood.

The place possesses uncommon, rare or endangered aspects of the cultural or natural history of New South Wales.

These two timber viaducts on the Cooma Line, together with four on the Main North Line, are a unique class of railway bridge.

== See also ==
- List of railway bridges in New South Wales
- Cornwall Railway viaducts
