= Gentiana bredboensis =

Scientific classification
- Kingdom: Plantae
- Clade: Tracheophytes
- Clade: Angiosperms
- Clade: Eudicots
- Clade: Asterids
- Order: Gentianales
- Family: Gentianaceae
- Genus: Gentiana
- Species: G. bredboensis

Binomial name
- Gentiana bredboensis L.G.Adams

Species of plant

Gentiana bredboensis commonly known as Bredbo gentian, is a flowering plant in the family Gentianaceae and is endemic to New South Wales. It is a small annual herb with white flowers.

== Description ==
Gentiana bredboensis is an annual herb, 2–9 cm (0.79–3.54 in) high with stems having multi-branches, the surface finely rough and uneven. The basal leaves are in pairs of 3–6, broadly oval-shaped, 8–12 mm (0.31–0.47 in) long, 8–12 mm (0.31–0.47 in) wide, margins finely rough to smooth. The cauline leaves are in pairs of 3–6, becoming thicker and smaller toward the end of the stem, 6–15 mm (0.24–0.59 in) long, and 5–8 mm (0.20–0.31 in) wide. The flowers are borne 1–6 on each plant, the calyx 5–8 mm (0.20–0.31 in) long with narrow winged ribs and the lobes 2.5–3.5 mm (0.098–0.138 in) long. The corolla is 8–10 mm (0.31–0.39 in) long, white on the inside, pinkish coloured on the outside with spreading lobes and separated 2–4 mm (0.079–0.157 in) at the end. Flowering has been recorded in December and the fruit is an oblong-oval shaped capsule 5–6 mm (0.20–0.24 in) long.

== Taxonomy and naming ==
Gentiana bredboensis was first formally described in 1988 by Laurence George Adams and the description was published in Telopea. The specific epithet (bredboensis) is in reference to the type location near the Bredbo River. DNA evidence may link this species with Gentiana baeuerlenii.

== Distribution and habitat ==
This gentiana has a restricted distribution near the Bredbo River on sandy, granitic soils in very wet conditions.

== Conservation status ==
Gentiana bredboensis is classified as "critically endangered" under the New South Wales Environment Protection and Biodiversity Conservation Act.
