= Kwiambal National Park =

National park in Australia

- IUCN category II (national park)
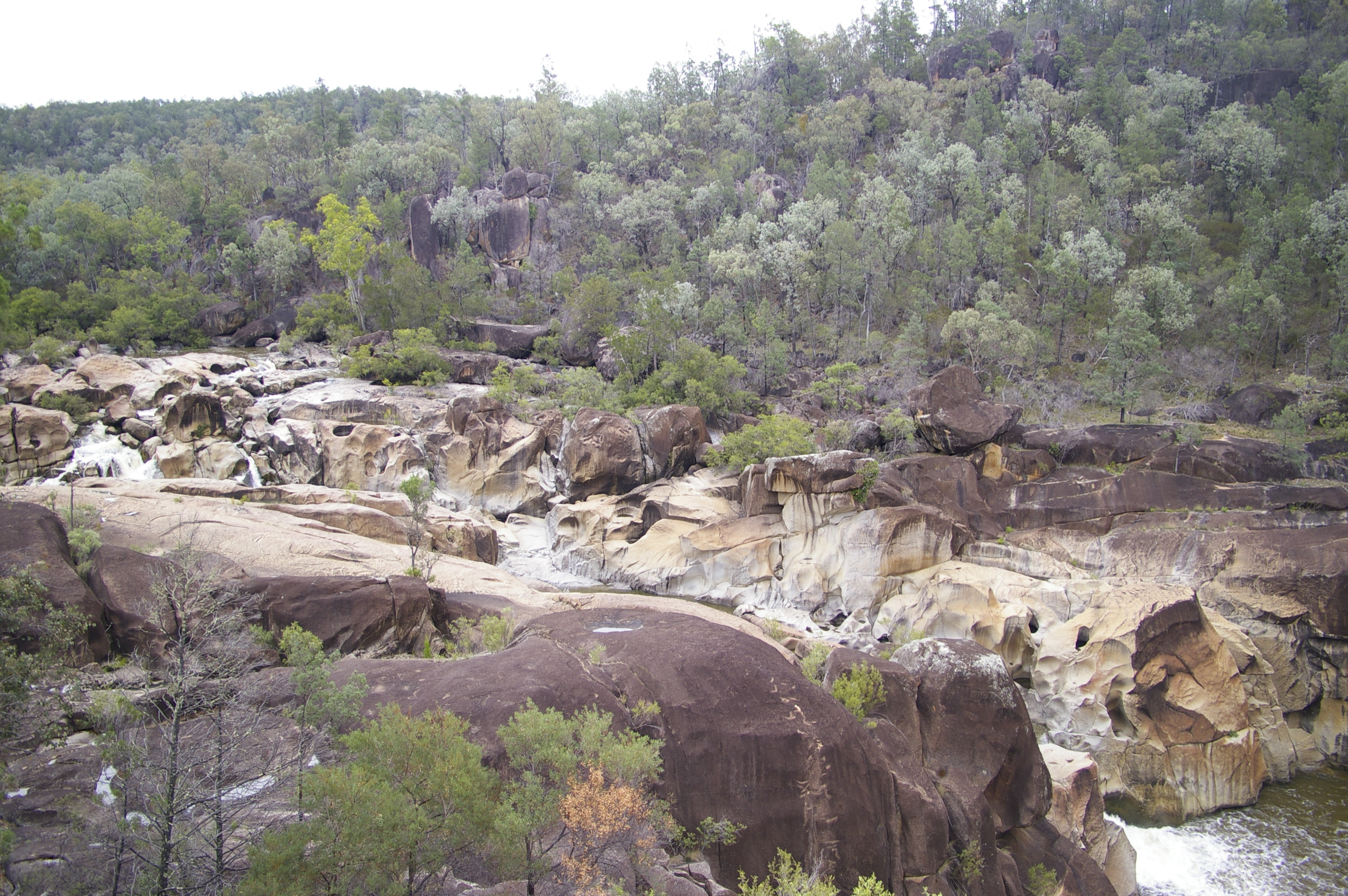
- MacIntyre Falls

- Location within New South Wales
- Location: New South Wales
- Nearest city: Ashford
- Coordinates: 29°09′15″S 150°59′02″E
- Established: 2000
- Governing body: NSW National Parks & Wildlife Service
- Website: Official website

Kwiambal is a national park in New South Wales, Australia located about 30 km from the town of Ashford. The Severn River and Macintyre River both flow through and finally converge in the park below the MacIntyre falls. The park is studded with granite outcrops and also features the Ashford Caves.

The nature reserve, near Inverell, offers accommodation, picnic spots, swimming, mountain biking, fishing and bird watching.

== History ==
The park was gazetted on 10 May 2000 and described as "County Arrawatta, Parishes Ena, Limestone and Severn, about 1301 hectares". A 2008 report on a vegetation survey by Dr John T. Hunter gives the area as 6,517 hectares.

== See also ==
- Protected areas of New South Wales
