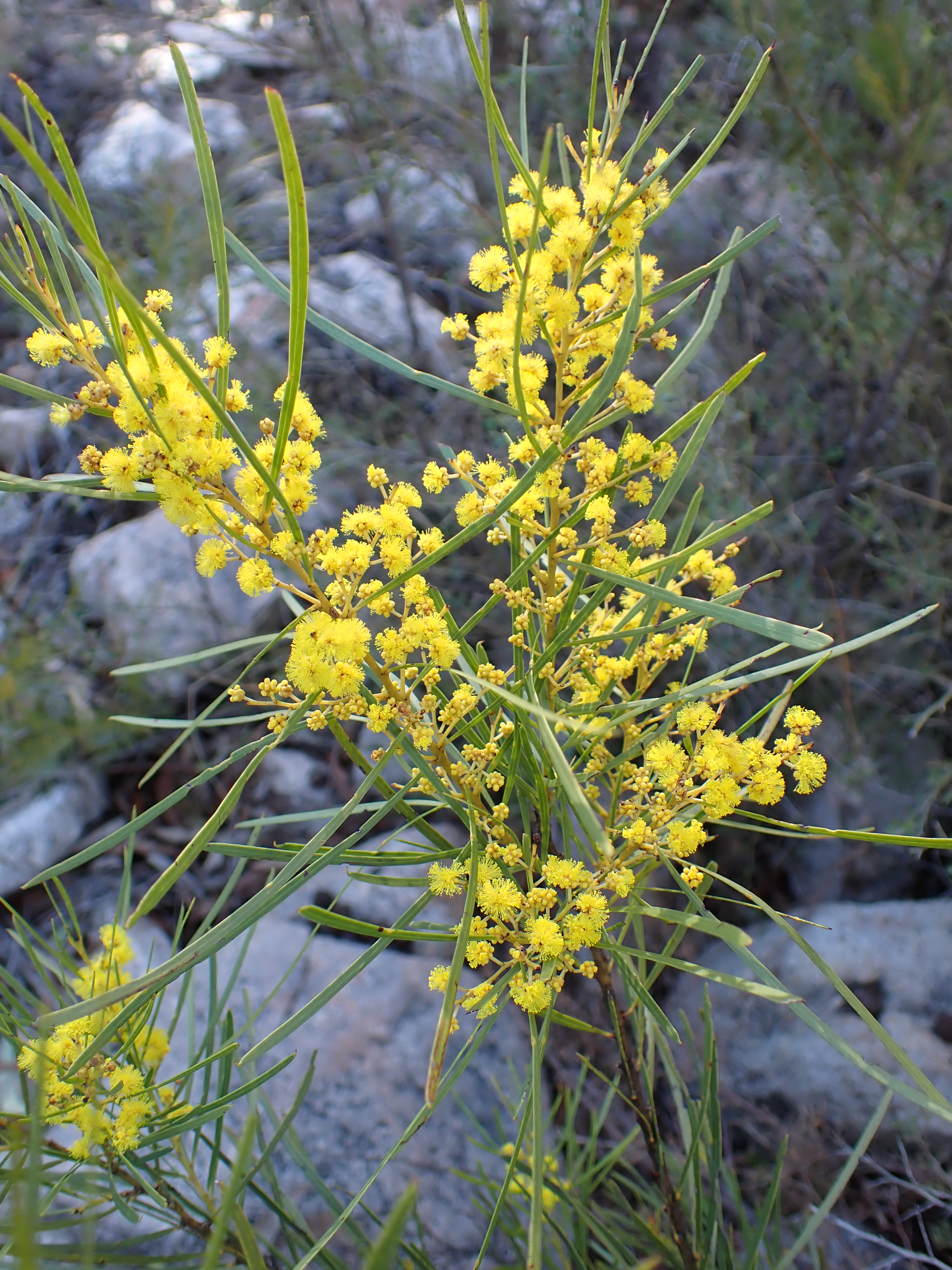
- Near Torrington

Conservation status
- Vulnerable (EPBC Act)

Scientific classification
- Kingdom: Plantae
- Clade: Embryophytes
- Clade: Tracheophytes
- Clade: Spermatophytes
- Clade: Angiosperms
- Clade: Eudicots
- Clade: Rosids
- Order: Fabales
- Family: Fabaceae
- Subfamily: Caesalpinioideae
- Clade: Mimosoid clade
- Genus: Acacia
- Species: A. macnuttiana

Binomial name
- Acacia macnuttiana Maiden & Blakely
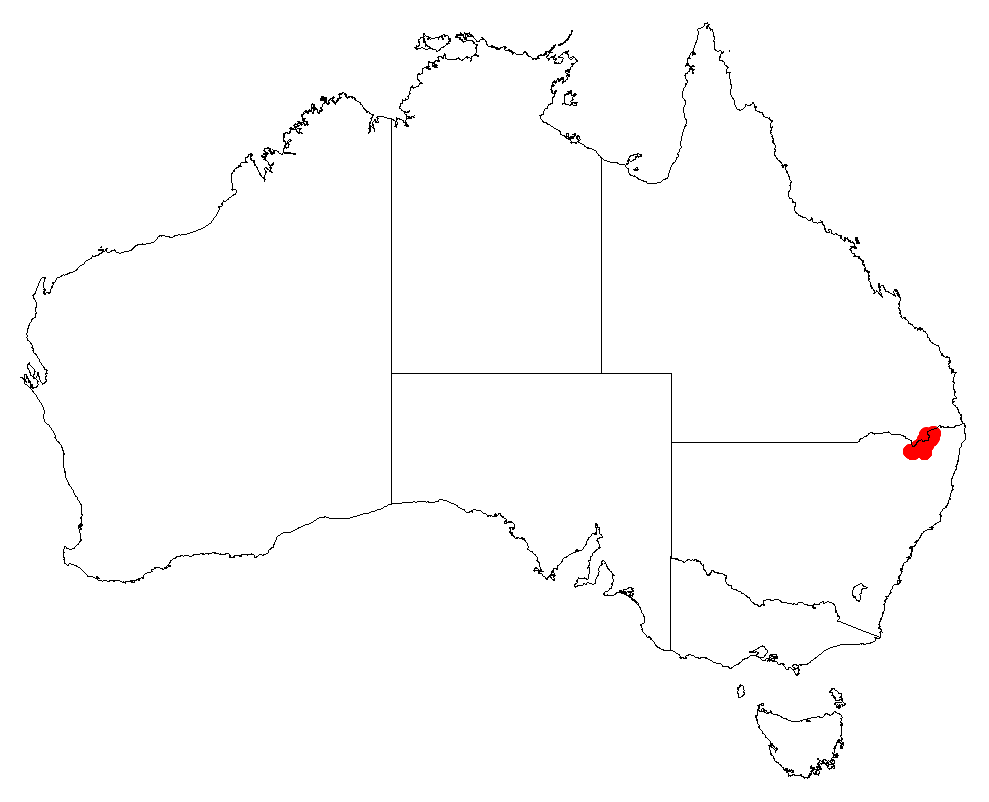
- Occurrence data from AVH

Synonyms
- Acacia mcnuttiana Maiden & Blakely orth. var.; Racosperma macnuttianum (Maiden & Blakely) Pedley

= Acacia macnuttiana =

McNutt's wattle

Species of legume

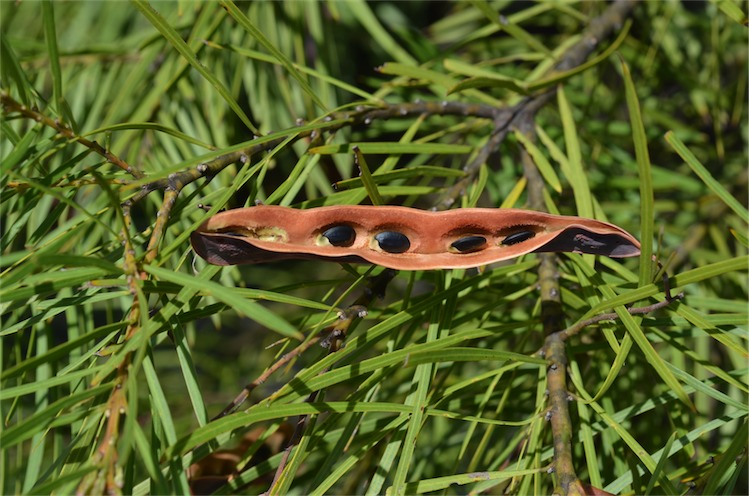
Foliage and pod

Acacia macnuttiana, commonly known as McNutt's wattle, is a species of flowering plant in the family Fabaceae and is endemic to north-eastern New South Wales, Australia. It is a shrub with linear phyllodes, spherical heads of bright yellow flowers arranged in racemes in leaf axils and seeds usually in more or less straight, leathery pods.

== Description ==
Acacia macnuttiana is a bushy shrub that typically grows to a height of 1.5–3 m (4 ft 11 in – 9 ft 10 in) with finely ribbed, dark coloured branchlets. The phyllodes are narrow linear, 80–150 mm (3.1–5.9 in) long and 2–3 mm (0.079–0.118 in) wide, thin and glabrous. The flowers are arranged in a raceme 10–50 mm (0.39–1.97 in) long with more or less spherical heads of ten to fifteen bright yellow flowers, each head on a peduncle 2–5 mm (0.079–0.197 in) long. Flowering occurs between July and September and the pods are usually more or less straight, oblong to broadly linear, up to 100 mm (3.9 in) long, 10–14 mm (0.39–0.55 in) wide, dark brown and leathery, containing black seeds.

== Taxonomy and naming ==
Acacia macnuttiana was first formally described in 1927 by Joseph Maiden and William Blakely in the Journal and Proceedings of the Royal Society of New South Wales from specimens collected in 1913 near the village of Bismuth near Torrington by Andrew McNutt who had been a schoolteacher at Hillgrove.

== Distribution and habitat ==
McNutt's wattle grows near rivers and along valleys on sandy soils derived from granite from near Torrington to Boonoo Boonoo Falls, near Pindari Dam and the Washpool National Park, in north-eastern New South Wales.

== Conservation status ==
This acacia is listed as 'Vulnerable' under the Commonwealth EPBC Act, and 'Endangered' under the Threatened Species Conservation Act of New South Wales.

== See also ==
- List of Acacia species
- Fabaceae
