= Mole River (New South Wales) =

Mole The Mole River
- Location of Mole River mouth in New South Wales

Location
- Country: Australia
- State: New South Wales
- Region: Northern Tablelands

Physical characteristics
- Source confluence: Deepwater River and Bluff River
  - location: west of Sandy Flat
  - coordinates: 29°13′08″S 151°56′48″E
  - elevation: 614 m (2,014 ft)
- Mouth: confluence with the Pike Creek to form the Dumaresq River
  - location: near Mole River (settlement)
  - coordinates: 28°59′47″S 151°31′03″E
  - elevation: 363 m (1,191 ft)
- Length: 73 km (45 mi)

Basin features
- River system: Macintyre River catchment, Murray–Darling basin

The Mole River, a watercourse that is one of the Border Rivers and part of the Macintyre catchment within the Murray–Darling basin, is located in the Northern Tablelands region of New South Wales, Australia.

== Course and features ==
Sourced from the western slopes of the Great Dividing Range, the river rises at the confluence of Deepwater River and Bluff River, west of Sandy Flat, and flows generally to the west before reaching its confluence with the Dumaresq River, near the village of Mole River, descending 252 metres (827 ft) over its 73 kilometres (45 mi) course.

The Mole River is one of the remotest headwaters of the Murray-Darling basin; and the area drained is hilly and rocky.

In 2007, Tenterfield Shire Council called for a dam to be constructed on the Mole River.

== See also ==
- Rivers of New South Wales
