= Deepwater River =

River in Australia

Coordinates: 29°13′S 151°57′E

Location
- Country: Australia
- State: New South Wales
- IBRA: New England Tablelands
- District: Northern Tablelands
- Municipalities: Glen Innes Severn, Tenterfield

Physical characteristics
- Source: Great Dividing Range
  - location: east of Deepwater
  - elevation: 1,080 m (3,540 ft)
- Mouth: confluence with Bluff River to form Mole River
  - location: near Sandy Flat
  - elevation: 601 m (1,972 ft)
- Length: 84 km (52 mi)

Basin features
- River system: Macintyre River, Murray–Darling basin

Deepwater River, a mostly perennial stream of the Dumaresq-Macintyre catchment within the Murray–Darling basin, is located in the Northern Tablelands district of New South Wales, Australia.

The river rises on the western slopes of the Great Dividing Range, near Old Man Gibber, east of Deepwater, and flows generally north northwest, west, and then west, before reaching its confluence with Bluff River to form the Mole River, near Sandy Flat, descending 479 metres (1,572 ft) over its 84 kilometres (52 mi) course.

The New England Highway crosses the river at the settlement of Deepwater.

== See also ==
- Rivers of New South Wales
- List of rivers of Australia
