= Sunnyside railway station, New South Wales =

Former railway station in New South Wales, Australia

Sunnyside

General information
- Location: Australia
- Coordinates: 28°59′18″S 151°57′07″E
- Line: Main North railway line

Other information
- Status: Closed

History
- Opened: 1888
- Closed: 1973

Services
Preceding station	Former services	Following station
Wallangarra Terminus	Main Northern Line	Tenterfield towards Sydney
Location

Sunnyside is a closed railway station on the Main North railway line in the New England region of New South Wales, Australia. The station opened in 1888 and closed in 1973. Currently only the platform face remains.

== See also ==
- Sunnyside rail bridge over Tenterfield Creek
- List of railway station in New South Wales
