= Ashford, New South Wales =

Ashford
- Town
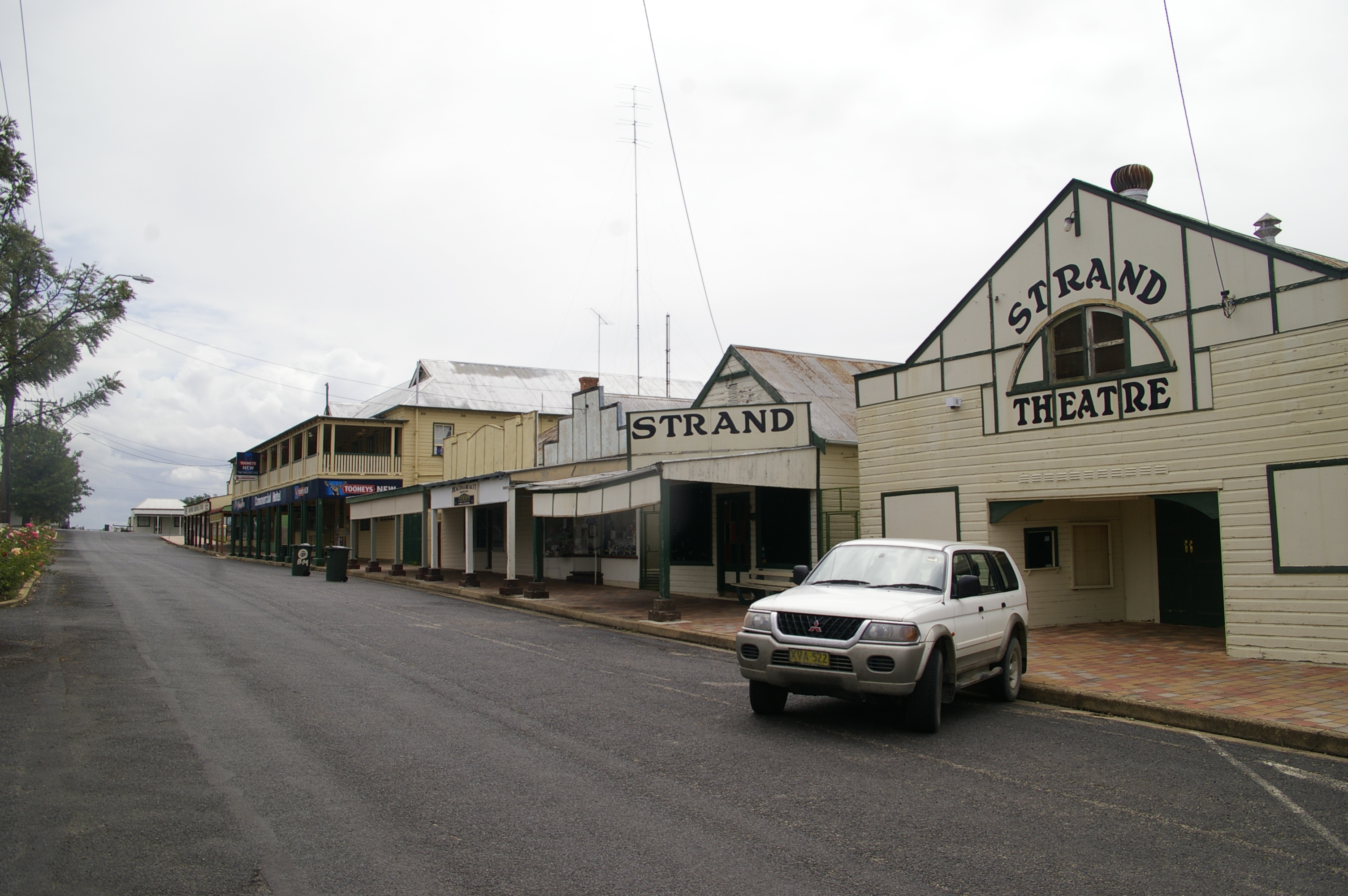
- The main street

- Coordinates: 29°19′23″S 151°05′33″E
- Country: Australia
- State: New South Wales
- LGA: Inverell Shire
- Location: 57 km (35 mi) N of Inverell; 71 km (44 mi) S of Texas; 370 km (230 mi) SW of Brisbane; 632 km (393 mi) N of Sydney

Government
  - State electorate: Northern Tablelands
  - Federal division: New England
- Elevation: 462 m (1,516 ft)

Population
  - Total: 659 (2021 census)
- Postcode: 2361
- County: Arrawatta
- Mean max temp: 24.8 °C (76.6 °F)
- Mean min temp: 10.1 °C (50.2 °F)
- Annual rainfall: 723.9 mm (28.50 in)

Ashford is a small village situated in the north-west on the Northern Tablelands of the state of New South Wales. The New England rural village of Ashford lies within the broad sunlit lands 632 km north of Sydney, 370 km south west of Brisbane, close to the Queensland border. Ashford is 430 metres above sea level and located 56 km north of Inverell on a major arterial road, connecting the Gwydir and Bruxner highways through to the Queensland border.

== History ==
"Frazer's Creek" Post Office was established in 1853 and renamed Ashford in 1863. The first police station was opened in 1864 and the first school in 1868.

Fred Ward a bushranger, known as "Captain Thunderbolt" rode in the area in 1867. Primary industries in the town over the years included tobacco farming and a local coal mine though each of these have ceased.

Today, the surrounding areas are used for sheep and cattle farming.

== Today ==
Ashford is a small community with a K-12 public school, basic shops, churches, and recreation and entertainment facilities, including a swimming pool, golf course and bowling club. Ashford Roosters play in the Group 19 Rugby League competition. It is the hub of a large agricultural area, an active retirement community, and regional tourism. Local attractions include Pindari Dam on the Severn River, MacIntyre Falls, the annual Ashford Salami Festival and Ashford Caves at Kwiambal National Park.

== Geography ==
=== Climate ===
Ashford has an elevation-influenced humid subtropical climate (Köppen: Cfa) with very warm, wetter summers and quite cool, drier winters. The wettest recorded day was 11 February 1976 with 160.0 mm (6.30 in) of rainfall. Extreme temperatures ranged from 43.0 °C (109.4 °F) on 22 December 2019 to −6.5 °C (20.3 °F) on 19 July 2007.

Climate data was sourced from the nearby Pindari Dam.

Climate data for Ashford (Pindari Dam) (29.39°S 151.24°E) (462 m (1,516 ft) AMSL) (1971-2025)
Month	Jan	Feb	Mar	Apr	May	Jun	Jul	Aug	Sep	Oct	Nov	Dec	Year
Record high °C (°F)	41.5 (106.7)	42.8 (109.0)	38.0 (100.4)	33.2 (91.8)	29.2 (84.6)	24.9 (76.8)	24.6 (76.3)	33.6 (92.5)	34.4 (93.9)	37.8 (100.0)	39.6 (103.3)	43.0 (109.4)	43.0 (109.4)
Mean daily maximum °C (°F)	31.3 (88.3)	30.6 (87.1)	29.0 (84.2)	25.5 (77.9)	21.6 (70.9)	18.0 (64.4)	17.2 (63.0)	18.9 (66.0)	22.3 (72.1)	25.4 (77.7)	27.5 (81.5)	30.2 (86.4)	24.8 (76.6)
Mean daily minimum °C (°F)	17.6 (63.7)	17.1 (62.8)	14.7 (58.5)	10.7 (51.3)	6.8 (44.2)	3.2 (37.8)	1.9 (35.4)	2.8 (37.0)	6.3 (43.3)	10.2 (50.4)	13.4 (56.1)	16.0 (60.8)	10.1 (50.1)
Record low °C (°F)	6.2 (43.2)	5.4 (41.7)	2.4 (36.3)	−1.0 (30.2)	−4.2 (24.4)	−5.8 (21.6)	−6.5 (20.3)	−6.0 (21.2)	−5.5 (22.1)	−0.5 (31.1)	1.7 (35.1)	5.2 (41.4)	−6.5 (20.3)
Average precipitation mm (inches)	90.8 (3.57)	74.6 (2.94)	68.8 (2.71)	45.7 (1.80)	42.1 (1.66)	38.3 (1.51)	42.2 (1.66)	37.3 (1.47)	47.5 (1.87)	62.9 (2.48)	84.4 (3.32)	89.1 (3.51)	723.9 (28.50)
Average precipitation days (≥ 0.2 mm)	9.3	7.8	7.1	5.1	6.1	6.6	7.3	6.2	6.3	7.8	9.4	9.6	88.6
Source: Bureau of Meteorology (1971-2025)
