= Dundee, New South Wales =

Dundee
- Suburb
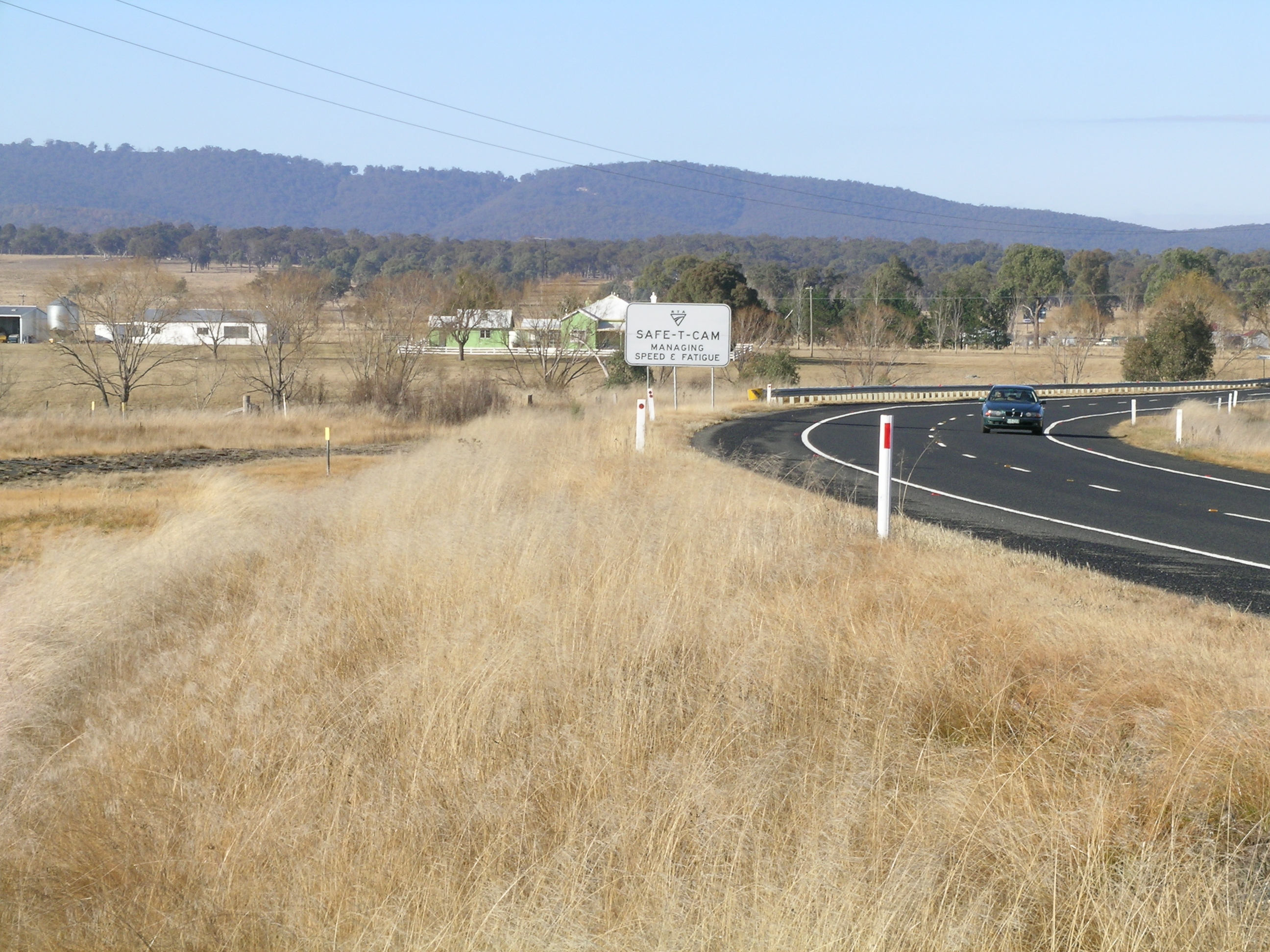
- New England Highway, Dundee

- Coordinates: 29°33′55″S 151°51′44″E
- Country: Australia
- State: New South Wales

Population
  - Total: 152 (SAL 2021)

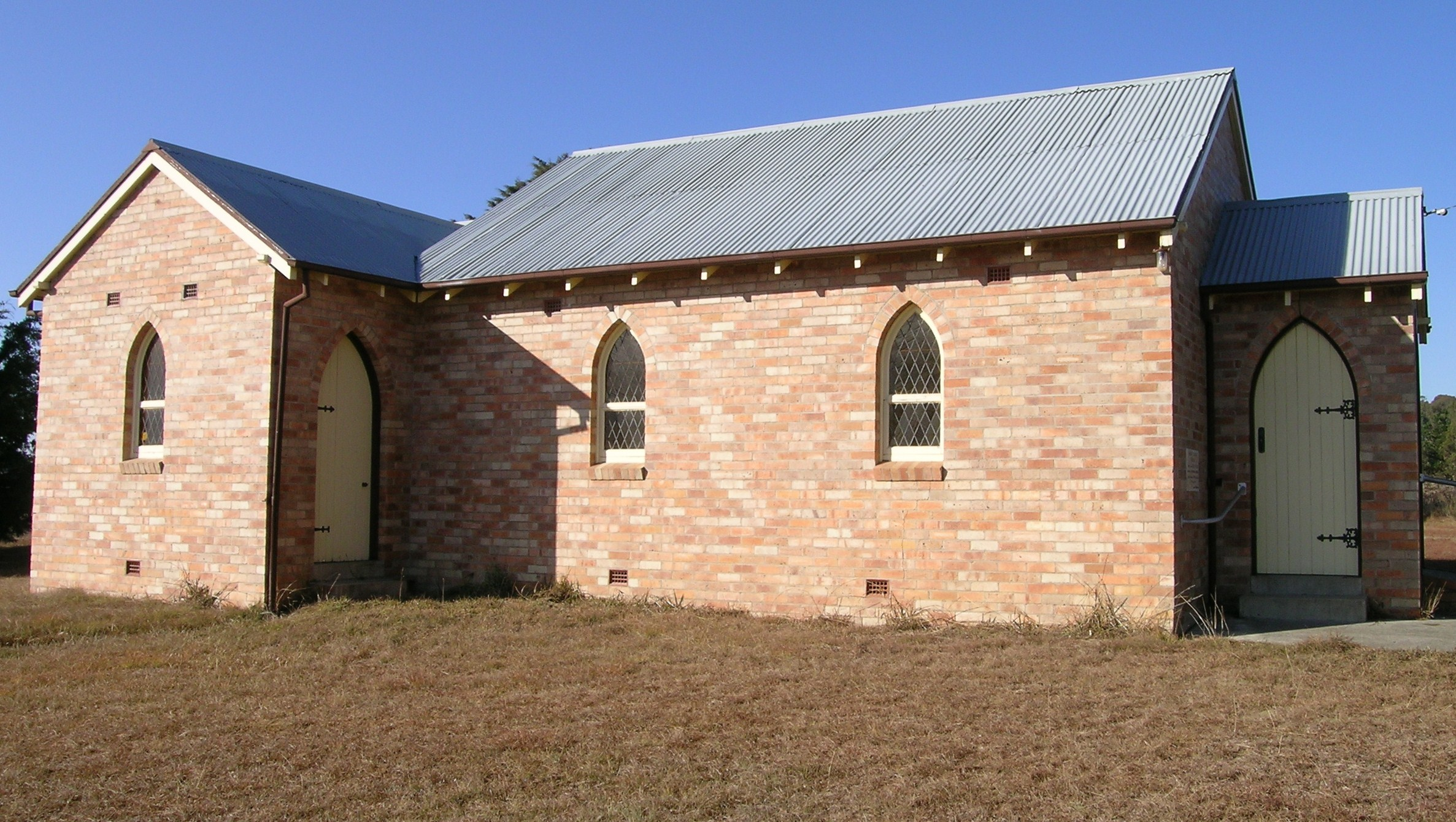
Church, Dundee, NSW

Dundee (29°33′S 151°51′E) is a rural locality about 40 kilometres north of Glen Innes on the Northern Tablelands, New South Wales, Australia. It is situated on the New England Highway at the Severn River in Severn parish, Gough County, New South Wales. The elevation is 985 metres.

== History ==
In 1838 John Baker and several others left Sydney to seek land and setup stations on the Northern Tablelands. After the others selected their land Baker continued north to secure the lease of 40,000 acres (160 km^{2}), which he called "Dareel Plains", later to become Dundee. By 1844 the property had been sold several times before Major Archibald Clunes Innes took it over that year. At one stage Innes was one of the wealthiest men in the Colony, but suffered heavily during the 1840s depression and was declared bankrupt in 1852. In 1845 the newly established Dundee flour mill was the first flour mill north of Aberdeen, New South Wales. Major Innes built the ‘Golden Fleece’ Hotel at Dundee in 1847, to become one of the first three hotels built in New England. The large colonial style brick building was the first important building to be erected near the shallow river crossing.

Cobb and Co coaches ran a coach service to Armidale, prior to the advent of the rail service. The Dundee Railway is 387 miles (705 km) north of Sydney and opened 1 September 1886 and closed 27 March 1976. The Public School opened in August 1853 and closed May 1974. Another school opened as Dundee Railway Station School in August 1891, changed to Dundee Rail 1940 and closed 1949. The Post Office opened 1 October 1851 and closed in 1974; a second post office opened as Dundee Railway Station 16 August 1885 and closed 1955.

In 1989 the Severn River Rail Bridge, 6 km west-south-west of Dundee and 18 km north-north-east of Glen Innes on the Main North railway line, was listed on the Register of the National Estate. The bridge consists of a series of timber trusses which was considered a significant technical accomplishment. When completed it was the longest timber truss bridge in Australia.

Little else remains of the village that once existed there, aside from the church, a sports ground and the cemetery.

The surrounding district supports sheep and beef cattle grazing plus some tourism.

== Heritage listings ==
Dundee has a number of heritage-listed sites, including:

- Main Northern railway, 701.98 km: Severn River railway bridge

== Media ==
Dundee is served by community radio station 2CBD FM. As well as broadcasting on two local FM frequencies 91.1 Deepwater and 105.9 Glen Innes, it has a live 24/7 feed via the internet. The station is the only radio station with studios in Glen Innes and is run by volunteers and presents local information and a diverse mix of music

== Citations ==
Preceding station	Former services	Following station
Deepwater towards Wallangarra	Main Northern Line	Glen Innes towards Sydney
