= Strike-a-Light River =

Strike-a-Light Tinderry Creek, Strike-A-Light Creek
- Location of the Strike-a-Light River mouth in New South Wales

Location
- Country: Australia
- State: New South Wales
- Region: South Eastern Highlands (IBRA), Monaro
- Municipality: Snowy Monaro

Physical characteristics
- Source: Great Dividing Range
  - location: near Jerangle
  - elevation: 1,200 m (3,900 ft)
- Mouth: Bredbo River
  - location: east of Bredbo
  - coordinates: 35°58′17″S 149°13′49″E
  - elevation: 733 m (2,405 ft)
- Length: 38 km (24 mi)

Basin features
- River system: Murrumbidgee catchment, Murray–Darling basin

The Strike-a-Light River, a perennial stream that is part of the Murrumbidgee catchment within the Murray–Darling basin, is located in the Snowy Monaro Regional Council area of New South Wales, Australia.

The river rises on the western slopes of the Great Dividing Range, near Jerangle, and flows generally north north-west, north-west, south-west and then south, joined by three minor tributaries, before reaching its confluence with the Bredbo River, east of Bredbo, descending 464 metres (1,522 ft) over its 38-kilometre (24 mi) course.

== Flora and fauna ==
Strike-a-Light River flows through the Strike-a-Light Nature Reserve.

The Strike-a-Light River is inhabited by a number of amphibian species: Bibron's toadlet (Pseudophryne bibronii), common eastern froglet (Crinia signifera), pobblebonk (Limnodynastes dumerilii), spotted grass frog (Limnodynastes tasmaniensis) and Verreaux's tree frog (Litoria verreauxii).

Vegetation communities through which the river passes include scribbly gum/apple box – dry shrub forest, ribbon gum – valley forest as well as partially cleared areas of natural vegetation.

== See also ==
- List of rivers of Australia
- List of rivers of New South Wales (L–Z)
- Rivers of New South Wales
