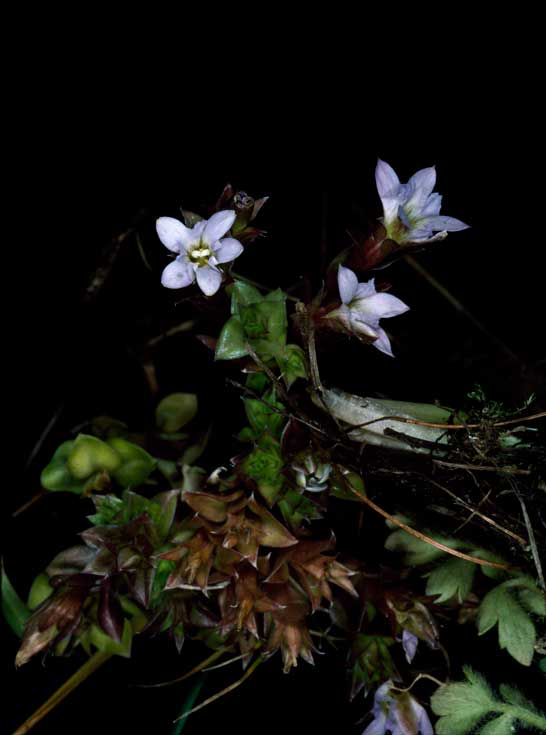

Scientific classification
- Kingdom: Plantae
- Clade: Tracheophytes
- Clade: Angiosperms
- Clade: Eudicots
- Clade: Asterids
- Order: Gentianales
- Family: Gentianaceae
- Genus: Gentiana
- Species: G. baeuerlenii

Binomial name
- Gentiana baeuerlenii L.G.Adams

= Gentiana baeuerlenii =

Species of plant

Gentiana baeuerlenii is a flowering plant in the family Gentianaceae and is endemic to New South Wales. It is a small annual herb with whitish-blue flowers.

== Description ==
Gentiana baeuerlenii is a small annual herb 2–4 cm (0.79–1.57 in) high with upright, smooth branches sometimes branching from the base, finely rough on upper surface, smooth below and sparsely branched. The basal leaves are mostly in pairs, sessile, broadly egg-shaped and up to 8 mm (0.31 in) long. The cauline leaves are in pairs of three or four, smaller than lower leaves and 4–6 mm (0.16–0.24 in) long. The flowers are borne 1-3 per plant on a short pedicel at the end of branches, corolla narrowly bell-shaped, whitish blue on the inside, greenish on the outside, 5–8 mm (0.20–0.31 in) long, calyx five lobed and 1–2.5 mm (0.039–0.098 in) long. Flowering occurs in October and the fruit is an oval-shaped capsule 3.5 mm (0.14 in) long.

== Taxonomy ==
Gentiana baeuerlenii was first formally described in 1988 by Laurence George Adams and the description was published in Telopea. The specific epithet (baeuerlenii) is in honour of the Bombala postmaster Wilhelm Baeuerlen, a keen amateur naturalist, who in 1887 sent the type specimen to Ferdinand von Mueller for identification.

== Distribution and habitat ==
This gentiana is believed to grow in moist locations near Bombala in New South Wales. It is known to exist in Victoria from a single 2023 collection from Wilsons Promontory and is regarded include the species Gentiana bredboensis.
