= Tenterfield railway station =

Historic site in New South Wales, Australia

Tenterfield
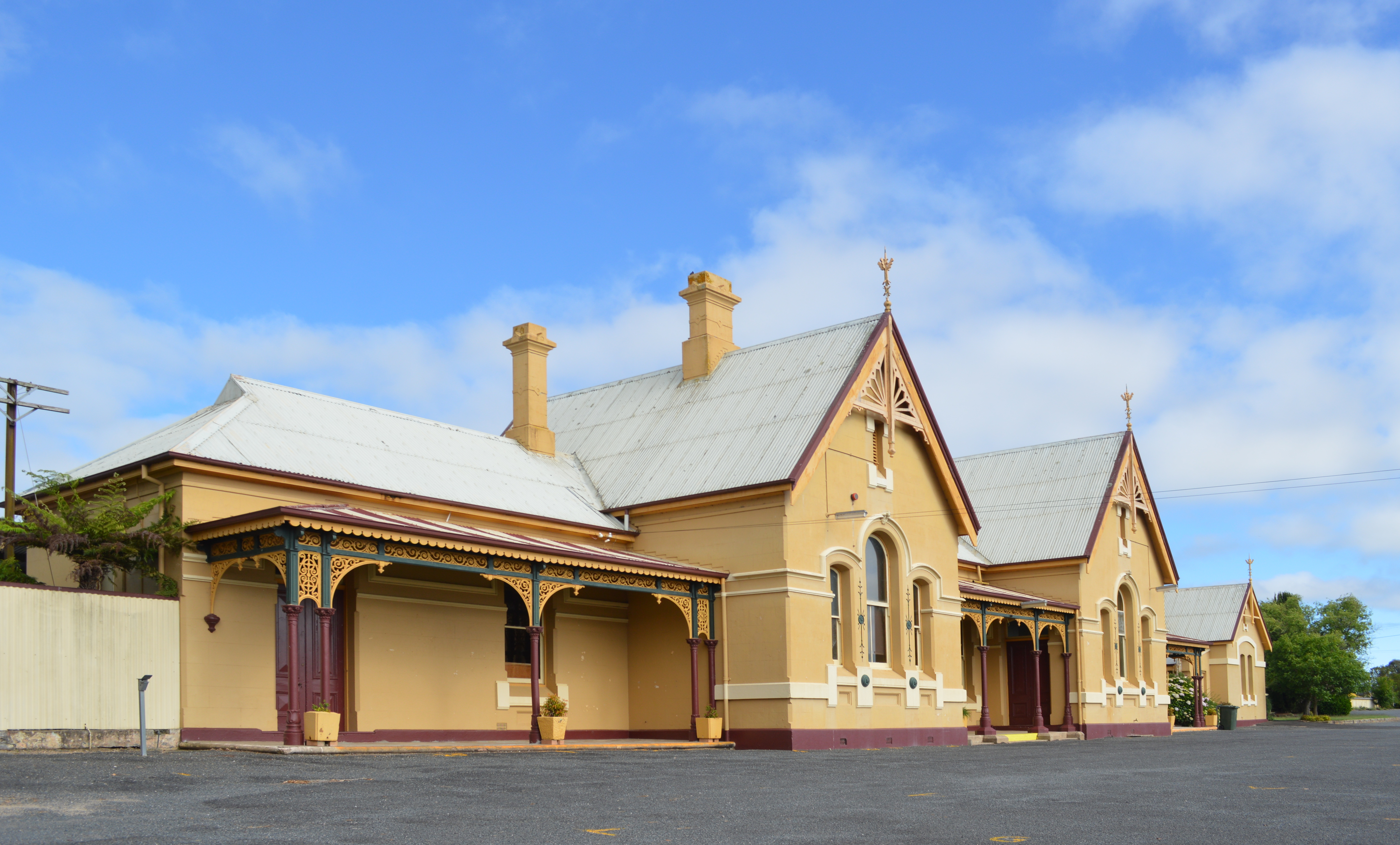
- Tenterfield railway station, 2017

General information
- Location: Railway Avenue, Tenterfield, Tenterfield Shire, New South Wales; Australia
- Coordinates: 29°03′20″S 152°00′19″E
- Owner: Transport Asset Manager of New South Wales
- Operator: State Rail Authority
- Line: Main Northern
- Distance: 773.87 km (480.86 mi) from Central
- Platforms: 1
- Tracks: 3

Construction
- Structure type: Ground
- Architect: John Whitton; William Murray

Other information
- Status: Closed
- Station code: TEN

History
- Opened: 1 September 1886
- Closed: 22 October 1989

Services
Preceding station	Former services	Following station
Sunnyside towards Wallangarra	Main Northern Line	Sandy Flat towards Sydney

New South Wales Heritage Register
- Official name: Tenterfield Railway Station group
- Type: State heritage (complex / group)
- Designated: 2 April 1999
- Reference no.: 1267
- Type: Railway Platform / Station
- Category: Transport – Rail
Location
- Location within New South Wales Location within Australia

The Tenterfield railway station is a heritage-listed closed railway station and now railway museum located on the Main Northern line, Tenterfield, Tenterfield Shire, New South Wales, Australia. It served the town of Tenterfield and opened on 1 September 1886 when the line was extended from Glen Innes. It was the terminus of the line until it was extended to Wallangarra on 16 January 1888. The railway station was designed by William Murray under the direction of John Whitton, the Chief Engineer of NSW Government Railways, and built during 1886. It is also known as Tenterfield Railway Station group. The property was added to the New South Wales State Heritage Register on 2 April 1999. The station has one platform with two loops.

The last train to operate north of Tenterfield was an Australian Railway Historical Society charter on 15 January 1988 hauled by diesel locomotive 4487. The last train to operate north of Glen Innes was hauled by steam locomotive 3001 on 22 October 1989 after which the line was formally closed north of Dumaresq. The last train to regularly service Tenterfield was the overnight Northern Mail which ceased in November 1988. The Northern Tablelands Express provided a daylight service to Tenterfield until truncated in October 1985 to Armidale.

After its closure, the station became home to the Tenterfield Railway Station Museum.

== History ==
Tenterfield railway precinct is located on the Main North line, running from Sydney and extending north to the Queensland border, at the town of Wallangarra. The Main North Line (also known as the Great Northern Railway) runs through the Central Coast, Hunter and the New England regions. The line was the original main line between Sydney and Brisbane, however this required a change of gauge at Wallangarra. The line is now closed north of Armidale, and the main route between Brisbane and Sydney is now the North Coast line.

In 1841, Sir Stuart Donaldson was running 18,000 sheep on a property that he named Tenterfield Station, after a family home in Scotland. Donaldson was the first Premier of New South Wales and made biannual trips to Tenterfield to inspect his holdings there, which covered 40,000 hectares (100,000 acres) of unfenced land. The township was gazetted in 1851 with allotments being sold in 1854. In 1858 gold was discovered at Drake (Fairfield) and shortly afterwards at Timbarra and Boonoo Boonoo. During 1859 an AJS Bank opened and an Anglican church was built the following year. In the 1860s The Tenterfield Chronicle was published; the district court was established; the building of a hospital commenced and a public school was opened. In 1870 the population was less than 900, but the town had five hotels, a school of arts and three churches. The existing Tenterfield Post Office was constructed in 1881.

In February 1886, it was announced that the successful contractor for the erection of the station buildings at Tenterfield was William Murray. Murray also undertook to provide a goods shed, an engine shed, foundations for an engine tank, a pumping engine house, an engine store, a coal stage, a 15-metre (50 ft) turntable pit, and various sheep and cattle races. On 1 September 1886 the line to Tenterfield was opened for business. By 1891 the engine driver's barracks had been completed, the last of the array of railway buildings and structures on the site.

The site comprised a locomotive depot, demolished in 1968, consisting of an engine shed; barracks, sign-on office, coal stage, turntable, loading dock and goods shed, which are still extant on site; and water columns and tanks, sand sheds, ash pits and oil/equipment store which no longer exist. The original locomotive shed was constructed in 1886 and was replaced by a new one on the same site in 1908.

The railway facilities at Tenterfield changed little over the next century. The only structural addition to the passenger station before World War I was an extension of the platform in 1907. In 1960 the station master's residence and the passenger station were connected to reticulated sewer system, but this was the only major work carried out in the station area. However, the buildings were modified to suit modern tastes. Old buildings were stripped of their decorative excesses to make them seem a little more modern. Thus, by 1965 Tenterfield Passenger Station had lost its wrought iron finials, timber pendants and fretted gable end decorations.

By the 1960s, the Tenterfield locomotive depot was becoming redundant with steam being rapidly phased out and diesel technology not requiring an infrastructure of locomotive depots. There was certainly no need for extensive service facilities at Tenterfield and no need for such facilities as ash pits, coal stages, and water tanks. On 8 June 1968, with the end of steam operations on the Northern Line, the locomotive shed at Tenterfield was demolished.

The development of the North Coast line resulted in a slow decline for Tenterfield, as passengers preferred the more direct route to Brisbane. The decline was most profound in the late 1950s and by November 1988 the last mail/passenger train left Tenterfield. On 17 July 1989, the State Rail Authority announced the pending closure of Tenterfield Railway Station, a decision that was effected on 30 November 1990. In 1991 the Tenterfield Railway Preservation Society was formed, and in 1992 a Heritage Museum was opened at the site. In 2007, the Office of Rail Heritage, Rail Corporation NSW, assumed management of seven key rail heritage precincts, which included Tenterfield.

Tenterfield and Tenterfield railway station were associated with a number of historical events in Australia's history:

- 1889 – Sir Henry Parkes delivered his famous Tenterfield speech calling for the Federation of Australia before departing on a special train to Sydney. The speech at the Tenterfield School of Arts is regarded as a significant event in the lead-up to Federation;
- 1919 – a quarantine facility was set up in Tenterfield during the influenza pandemic;
- 1942 – During World War II, Tenterfield was earmarked as a key battleground if the Japanese should invade Australia. During 1942 thousands of soldiers were set up in emergency camps, unbeknown to the locals, to cope with such an event. Minor changes were made to the railway barracks for defence requirements.

== Description ==
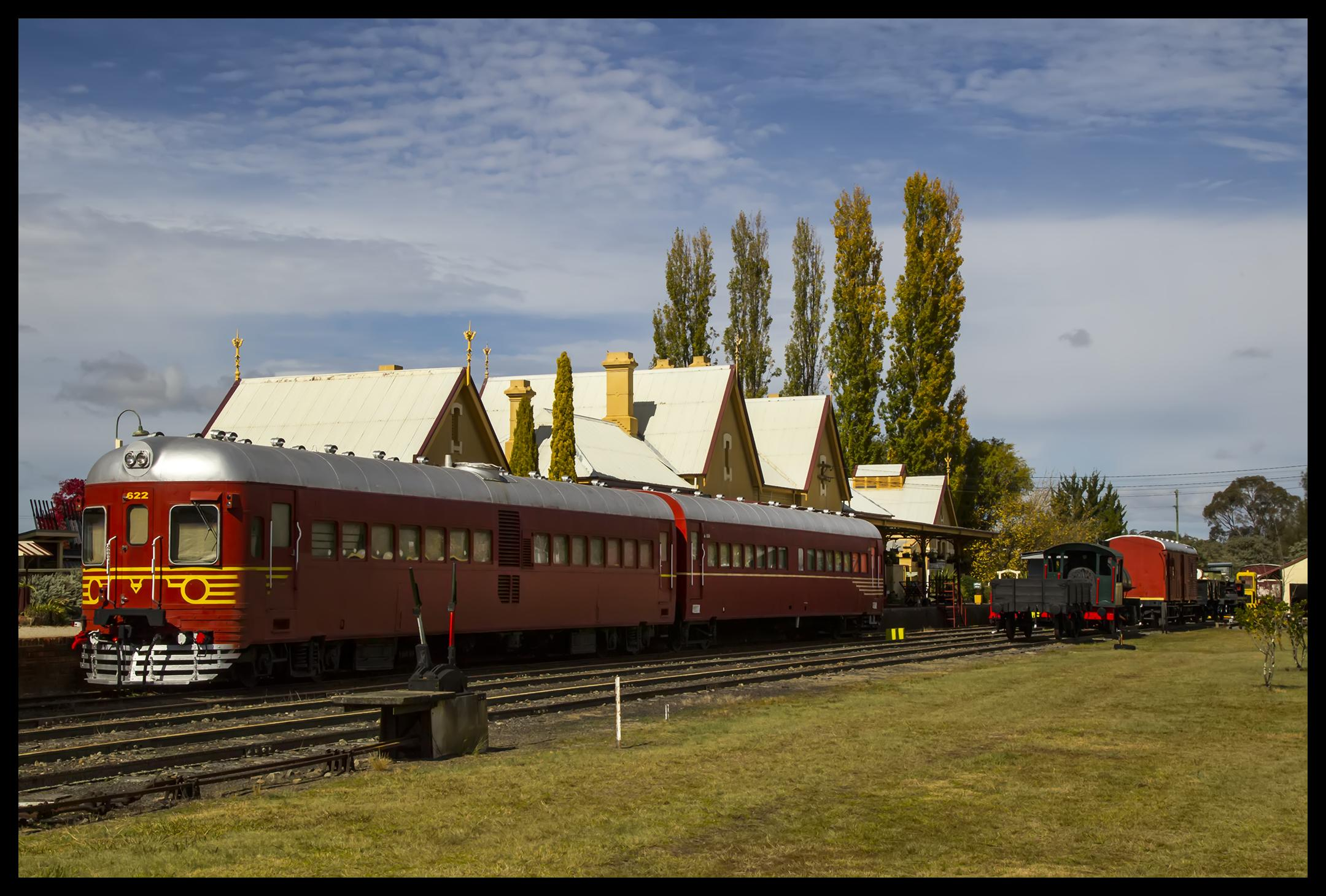
New South Wales 620/720 class railcars at Tenterfield railway station, 2014

Major structures on the site include a type 5 first class station building, completed in 1886; a platform, completed c. 1886; a brick barrack, completed in 1890; a weatherboard barrack, completed c. 1948; a goods shed; a per way shed; and a sign-on shed. Other structural items include a 18-metre (60 ft) turntable, with brickwork bedding, completed in 1899; a loading platform, made from pre-fabricated concrete; a T433 jib crane, completed in 1886; and forecourt plantings. Coal stage archaeological remnants were completed in c. 1949.

The Tenterfield station building was completed in 1886 and is a first class, long and narrow, single storey, brick structure with a painted, rendered exterior. It comprises a main central body flanked by small blocks, one on either side, separated from the main body of the building by a small courtyard. The architectural features and style bears references to Rustic Gothic in the use of steeply pitched prominent gables with decorative bargeboards, finials, pendants and label moulds, and Filigree in the use of cast iron filigree and ornamental columns to verandahs. The central body of the building has two projecting portions with sharply pitched gables rising above the roofline of the main body of the building. Three verandahs run in between the two projecting portions and to either side. The main roof is hipped and gabled with two small gablets (gable on hip) and is punctuated by numerous chimney shafts. The gables have prominent bargeboards, decorative timber fretwork, pendant and finial, and louvered timber ventilators. The front façade has decorative detailing in render in the form of raised mouldings/cornices and label courses. The rear façade is similar in features and detailing and has a series of doors and windows opening on to the platform. A deep verandah runs along the length of the central block on the platform side supported by cast iron columns. The layout comprises a waiting room in the centre with the main entrance, and a series of rooms on either side, all having access through the platform.

The smaller side blocks have a gable front and a lean-to shed/verandah on the side opening onto the courtyard. The southern block is the men's toilet block and has a small gabled roof vent with louvers. The buildings retain their original configuration, having undergone very few modifications since their construction in 1886.

The c. 1886 platform is brick faced and was extended in 1907. The platform includes two timber gates which are likely to be original, one at the southern end and the other at the northern; two "Tenterfield" metal signs, and an Avery weighing scale.

The brick barrack building was completed in 1890 and is the former engine driver's residence and was constructed out of brick. It has a gable roof with smaller cross gables facing the front and rear. There are verandahs with simple timber posts along both elevations. Features and detailing including a chimney; scalloped timber valence to the sides of the verandahs; oval opening to the gables; plinth course and sill course in render; panelled doors with flymesh doors; and double hung windows with flymesh windows. The roof structure comprises timber king post trusses with raised tie and supporting timber boarding with corrugated, galvanised iron roofing. Some portions have ceilings which appear to be later additions. The chimney has two distinct vertical portions indicating that the eastern portion was added later, perhaps in 1942 when changes were made. The original layout comprised four individual bedrooms in a back-to-back arrangement, each facing onto a verandah, with doors and windows opening onto it. A narrow combined toilet/ washroom/ bathroom extended across the width of the building with access from each of the verandahs. There was a larger meal room and a kitchen both with access from either verandahs. The building retains much of the original layout and features, displaying a high level of integrity.

The weatherboard barracks were constructed in c. 1948 consist of three single storey weatherboard huts. Each hut comprises timber weatherboard walls and timber floor with a window in the centre of the east façade and a door in the centre of the west façade. The roof construction is unusual in having two corrugated, galvanised iron roof coverings with a gap between the two. The top one is a common roof and floats like a canopy with timber rafters supported by brackets under the projecting eaves mounted on walls through bolts. Each of the huts is supported by timber floor beams resting on masonry plinths. This might suggest that the huts were probably prefabricated and used as modular units. The huts are separated by gaps with windows on either side. Other features include double hung windows, battened doors, matchboard ceiling and weatherboard interior walls.

The goods shed is 41.1 by 9.1 metres (135 ft × 30 ft) in dimensions and was constructed in 1886 out of corrugated, galvanised iron cladding on timber framing with a gabled roof supported on timber brackets. The roof includes projecting eaves and exposed rafter ends. The barge boards have carved ends. There is a gable roofed, weatherboard office with a chimney, attached to the north side of the shed. The roof is supported by timber king post trusses. The windows are timber, double hung sash.

A timber deck surrounds the building on all sides. For easy access to rail wagons, the building and deck are raised, the former on brick piers and the latter on timber stumps. There are protective rails all along the walls. The per way shed structure comprises a single-skin of corrugated, galvanised iron sheet cladding on steel frame and steel trusses supporting the gabled roof of corrugated, galvanised iron. The roof has overhanging eaves supported by steel brackets. The windows comprise unglazed openings. The shed is used to display trikes.

The sign-on shed is understood to have been built in 1940s as a small timber-framed office building on the western side of the engine shed, between the barrack and the shed itself. The building originally had three distinct portions- chargeman/DLE's office, sign-on room, and WC/wash basin area. The lower portion of the exterior walls is weatherboard and the upper fibro cement board. Internally, the walls are asbestos cement sheeting. The building has a hipped roof clad in asbestos cement sheeting and an unusual corner brick fireplace/chimney. A full verandah runs along the front (eastern) façade and a pathway with steps led up through the terraced garden. The building retains good integrity. The building existed in a poor condition until 1999 when it was restored to its present state. It is currently used as the District Manager's office.

The 1899 turntable is constructed out of cast iron and is 18 metres (60 ft) in diameter. It is manually operated and sits on circular brickwork bedding. The loading platform is located towards the northern end of the railway precinct and comprises a raised area with ramps on both ends and a concrete retaining wall along the track. The concrete wall appears to be constructed of pre-fabricated panels. The T433 jib crane was constructed in 1886 and sits on a solid concrete pedestal/platform and is operational. The coal stage was constructed in 1949 out of timber bearers supported on steel beams on steel uprights made from rail tracks on the site of the original 1886 coal stage. Only scant remnants remain as relics of the original structure.

=== Condition ===
As at 8 May 2013, Railway station building: good Platform and its elements: moderate Trike display shed: good Timber barracks: moderate Residential Barracks: moderate Sign-on Office: good Coal stage: structurally sound Turntable: good Loading platform: good Goods shed: generally good but decking is in poor condition

The precinct has a high level of integrity with a near-complete grouping of railway structures. The station buildings also have a high level of integrity and are in sound condition.

=== Modifications and dates ===
Since the 1886 construction of the railway station, coal stage, goods warehouse, Station Master's residence, water tank, 15-metre (50 ft) turntable and locomotive shed, the railway station and precinct has been modified as follows:

- 1890 – Engine drivers barracks erected
- 1891 – Additional coal stage constructed. There is also reference to extension of a coal stage in 1908 and reconstruction of a coal stage (most likely the original) in 1949 to reduce length.
- 1899 – Original 15-metre (50 ft) turntable replaced with 18-metre (60 ft) turntable. Built by William Sellers of Philadelphia in 1886, it replaced an earlier 15-metre (50 ft) diameter turntable, installed on a siding, which was a northern extension of the goods siding.
- 1908 – Coal stage extended original engine shed reconstructed and extended
- 1918 – Trackwork alterations and depressed sidings installed
- 1925 – An additional 0.091-megalitre (20,000 imp gal) water tank installed
- 1928 – Hydraulic jacks installed for engine lifting
- 1929 – An additional 0.091-megalitre (20,000 imp gal) water tank installed
- 1942 – Alterations for Defence requirements, to Barracks
- 1945 – Electric lighting to the engine shed & depot; telephone and call bells installed at the cocoa shed
- 1946 – Additional Locomotive accommodation installed
- 1947 – Coaling tractors improved
- 1948 – Additional locomotive accommodation installed
- 1949 – Coal stage reconstructed to reduced length
- 1950 – Hot water service installed at the Barracks
- 1951 – Improvements to the Loco. accommodation
- 1959 – Ash pit extended
- c. 1960s – Railway institute demolished
- 1968 – Demolition of the engine shed
- 1989 – Trackwork removed at the Tenterfield depot
- 2000 – Conservation works completed on station and yard

== Heritage listing ==
Tenterfield is a major Victorian country first class station complex, one of the last designed by John Whitton, in its original setting with landscaped forecourt and good support buildings including the formerresidence, barracks and goods shed. The building retains much of its original fit out and is one of the best surviving station complexes in the State. The station building is one of the major structures in the northern part of the State and reflects the earliest period of railway construction in the north of the State. The buildings form an important townscape element in Tenterfield and contribute to the heritage value of the area.

The Tenterfield railway station was listed on the New South Wales State Heritage Register on 2 April 1999 having satisfied the following criteria.

The place is important in demonstrating the course, or pattern, of cultural or natural history in New South Wales.

The Tenterfield railway precinct is state significant for its historical values as a tangible link to the development of the Great Northern Railway (GNR) line during the 19th century as well as the development of the NSW railways during the steam era. The GNR was an important achievement in transport and engineering within NSW. As the third main trunk rail route in NSW stretching from Sydney to the Queensland border, the line linked townships to one another as well as to Sydney leading to significant economic and social impacts for those individual townships as well as for NSW generally. The establishment of the station itself was one of the biggest events in the history of Tenterfield and its surrounding areas.

Tenterfield railway precinct is a large and highly intact railway precinct demonstrating the typical elements of a large, 19th century railway station and yard with a large and grand, first class station building; a brick, engine drivers' barracks and 3 weatherboard huts; goods shed; a coal stage; a 18-metre (60 ft) turntable pit; station master's residence; coal stage; footbridge, and associated facilities such as the jib crane. These items relate to the steam era of the railways and were once necessary and typical infrastructure found throughout NSW.

The Tenterfield railway precinct is linked with a number of significant historical events such as the Federation movement; the flu epidemic following the first world war; visiting dignitaries; wars, and the gradual demise of the railway service. The station was the site of Sir Henry Parkes' departure for Sydney to advocate for Federation following his "Tenterfield speech" at the Tenterfield School of Arts; the departure and arrival of soldiers during the First World War; it became an emergency quarantine station when the influenza pandemic broke out in 1919; and the station yard provided accommodation for staff of the defence forces during WWII in the form of a special siding in 1942. Finally, the station's conversion to a museum is witness to the gradual decline in rail use leading to the closure of the Tenterfield line in late 1980s, following a similar pattern in other parts of the country.

The place has a strong or special association with a person, or group of persons, of importance of cultural or natural history of New South Wales's history.

Tenterfield railway station is associated with Sir Henry Parkes as an advocate of Federation. It was from Tenterfield railway station that he set out on a special train to Sydney after his historic speech at the Tenterfield School of Arts calling for a federation.

The place is important in demonstrating aesthetic characteristics and/or a high degree of creative or technical achievement in New South Wales.

The Tenterfield railway station has aesthetic significance as a first class station building (of which only 19 were built) demonstrating the architectural features and ornamentation of Rustic Gothic in the use of steeply pitched prominent gables with decorative bargeboards, finials, pendants and label moulds, and Filigree in the use of cast iron filigree and ornamental columns to verandahs. The front façade has decorative detailing in render in the form of raised mouldings/cornices and label courses. The rear façade is similar in features and detailing.

It is a prominent building within the streetscape of Tenterfield. The street facade of the station building is highly intact and visible from a long distance.

The place has a strong or special association with a particular community or cultural group in New South Wales for social, cultural or spiritual reasons.

The Tenterfield railway precinct is of social significance to the local community having performed an important role in supporting the town as a regional centre for agricultural commerce and thereby being the site of significant activity and employment. The railway precinct is now a museum run by the Tenterfield Railway Preservation Society who actively conserve and promote rail heritage at the site. The site is significant for its ability to contribute to the local community's sense of place and provides a connection to the local community's past.

The place has potential to yield information that will contribute to an understanding of the cultural or natural history of New South Wales.

As a large railway precinct consisting of a variety of buildings and structures with good integrity, Tenterfield railway precinct has the potential to provide research opportunities regarding the technical and operational aspects of a regional railway precinct during the steam era.

The place possesses uncommon, rare or endangered aspects of the cultural or natural history of New South Wales.

Tenterfield station is rare as a good example of a regional rail centre near a state border, which has retained examples of various periods of building and technology. The 1890 railway barracks are of particular significance as one of the oldest and most intact in NSW.

The place is important in demonstrating the principal characteristics of a class of cultural or natural places/environments in New South Wales.

The Tenterfield railway precinct is representative of a typical 19th century railway precinct, with a variety of buildings, structures and facilities associated with the steam era of railway technology as well as how this typical 19th century precinct developed both operationally and technologically over 100 years.

== See also ==
- List of railway stations in New South Wales
