= Ashford Caves =

Karst in New South Wales, Australia

- Bats occupy several caverns in the caves complex.

- Location within New South Wales
- Location: Ashford, New South Wales, Australia
- Coordinates: 29°12′29″S 150°58′56″E
- Geology: Limestone
- Access: Public
- Show cave opened: 1915
- Show cave length: 560 metres (1,840 ft)

The Ashford Caves, located within the Kwiambal National Park, are a series of caves that contain an outcrop of coralline limestone and are located in the New England Northern Tablelands region of New South Wales, in eastern Australia. The caves are managed by the NSW National Parks & Wildlife Service and are situated approximately 8 kilometres (5.0 mi) west of the former Ashford coal mine, north of Ashford and not far from the Queensland border town of Texas.

Originally on a private property, the Ashford Caves are now part of the Kwiambal National Park. A basic camping ground called 'Lemon Tree Flat' is located within a 10-kilometre (6.2 mi) radius of the cave entrance, as are the Macintyre Falls.

The large arch-shaped opening was made to access the phosphate (guano) resources for use as fertilizer, which has been quite profitable. Prospects of mining limestone at this location have been explored, but dismissed as unviable.

A colony of Eastern Bent-wing Bats inhabits the cave system and breeds from November through March.

== History ==
The people of Kwiambal are the local owners of the cave. Around the year 1830 European settlement began, and during the time of settlement gangs were brought to the area and killed many of the indigenous people who worked on that land. The Ashford cave system is filled with a variety of minerals and natural resources that were used to make a profit, most notably phosphate. Around the WWII era, the supply of phosphate was critical and needed to create explosives and weapons for war. During this time the Ashford caves phosphate resource was taken into consideration, but was deemed unfit to produce such weapons to support the war efforts.

== See also ==
- List of caves in New South Wales
