= Bredbo River railway bridge =

Former bridge in New South Wales, Australia

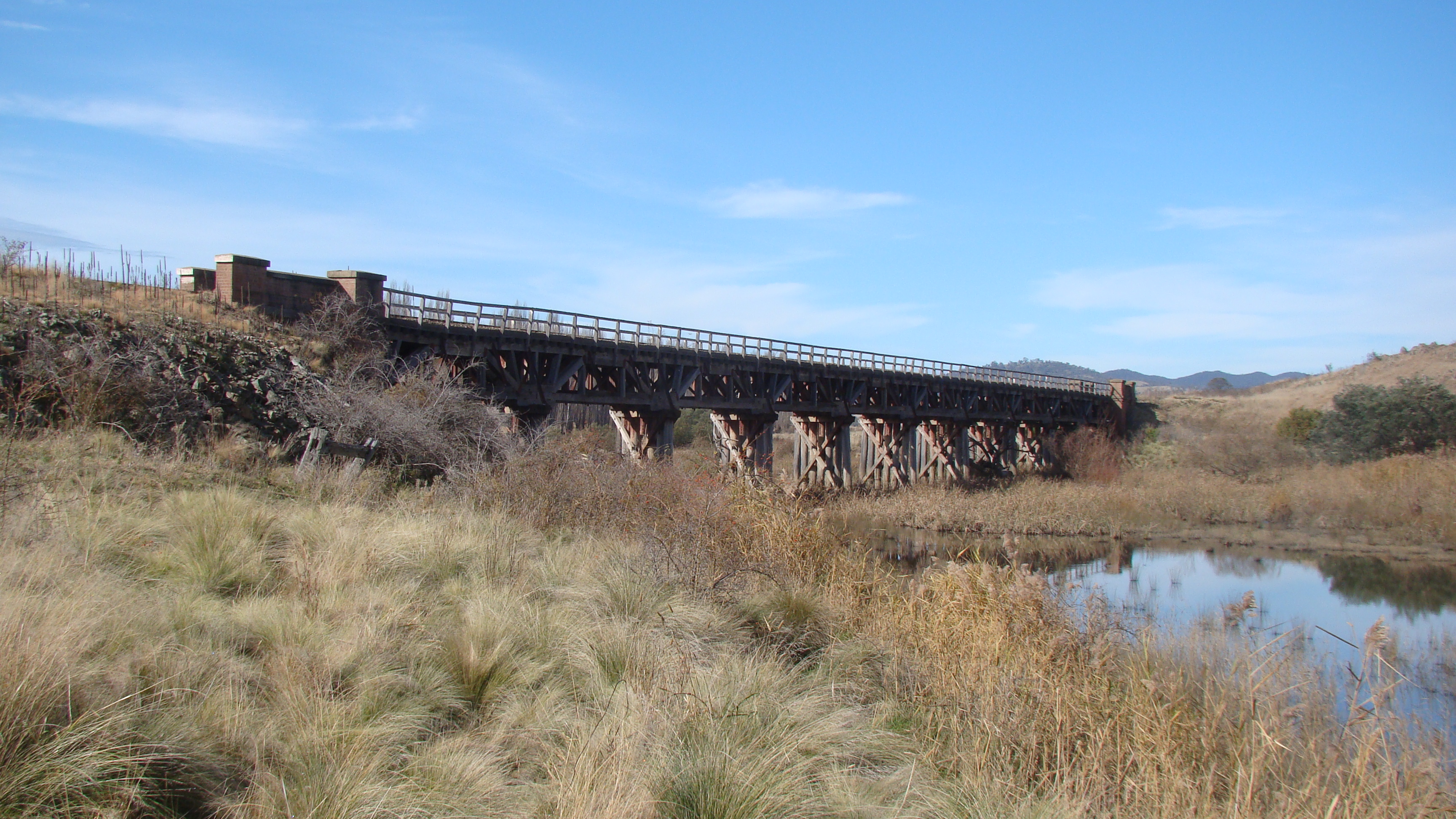
- Bredbo River bridge
- Coordinates: 35°58′29″S 149°09′45″E
- Carries: Bombala railway line
- Crosses: Bredbo River
- Locale: Bredbo, Snowy Monaro Regional Council, New South Wales, Australia
- Owner: Transport Asset Manager of New South Wales

Characteristics
- Design: Queen post deck truss viaduct
- Material: Ironbark
- Total length: 130 metres (420 ft)
- Longest span: 13 metres (42 ft)
- No. of spans: 10
- Piers in water: 9

Rail characteristics
- No. of tracks: 1
- Track gauge: 4 ft 8 1/2 in (1,435 mm) standard gauge

History
- Designer: John Whitton; Engineer-in-Chief for Railways
- Fabrication by: Bryce Henry
- Construction start: 1881
- Construction end: 1889

New South Wales Heritage Register
- Official name: Bredbo Rail Bridge Group; Bredbo River Railway Viaduct
- Type: State heritage (complex / group)
- Designated: 2 April 1999
- Reference no.: 01029
- Type: Railway Bridge / Viaduct
- Category: Transport – Rail
- Builders: Main Contractor for the Queanbeyan to Cooma railway

Location
- Interactive map of Bredbo River railway bridge

The Bredbo River railway bridge is a heritage-listed former railway bridge carrying the Bombala railway line over the Bredbo River at Bredbo in the Monaro region of New South Wales, Australia. It was designed by John Whitton in his capacity as Engineer-in-Chief for Railways and built from 1881 to 1889. It is also known as the Bredbo Rail Bridge and the Bredbo River Railway Viaduct. The property is owned by Transport Asset Manager of New South Wales, an agency of the Government of New South Wales. It was added to the New South Wales State Heritage Register on 2 April 1999. On 1 December 2020, changes were made to exemptions relating to the bridge's heritage status.

== History ==
The railway was extended from Queanbeyan to Cooma in 1887–89. At that time, the Engineer-in-Chief for Railways, John Whitton, was under government pressure to reduce construction costs. One common method was to build timber bridges, mostly ballast top timber beam bridges. However, for two major waterways, Ingalara Creek Michelago Rail Bridge over Ingalara Creek and the Bredbo River, he chose to use Queen post deck trusses, a type of timber truss viaduct that he had already used on the Main North line between Glen Innes and Wallangarra. Nearer to Cooma, at Chakola, he chose a different type of timber viaduct to cross Umaralla Creek. Several of Whitton's other Queen post deck truss bridges – the Breardy River, Severn River and Bluff River viaducts and the Tenterfield Creek bridge – are also listed on the New South Wales Heritage Register.

== Description ==
The Bredbo Rail Bridge is a ten-span timber truss viaduct. Each span is 12 metres (40 ft), centre to centre, of timber trestles.

The Queen deck truss design was copied from one of Isambard Kingdom Brunel's Cornish timber bridges, the St Germans viaduct, which was built about 30 years earlier.

The condition of the bridge was reported as fair as at 4 April 2006 due to lack of maintenance since rail services were suspended.

All these viaducts retain their original fabric.

== Heritage listing ==
The timber Queen post truss viaduct was an economic bridge for the Queanbeyan to Cooma Railway at a time when the boom years of the 1880s were ending and funding for railway construction was decreasing. The Bredbo viaduct is accessible from the Monaro Highway and is an impressive timber structure. The Cooma Railway made a significant contribution to the development of the Monaro Region from the time of its construction 1887–89, and all the timber viaducts were important items of the railway's infrastructure. The timber Queen post deck viaduct was a significant structure in place of the expensive iron lattice bridges preferred by John Whitton. The Bredbo viaduct was technically sound and durable, having been built from renowned ironbark hardwood. The two deck Queen post truss timber viaducts on the Cooma Line, together with four on the Main North Line, are a unique class of railway bridge.

Bredbo Rail Bridge was listed on the New South Wales State Heritage Register on 2 April 1999 having satisfied the following criteria.

The place is important in demonstrating the course, or pattern, of cultural or natural history in New South Wales.

The timber Queen post truss viaduct was an economic bridge for the Queanbeyan to Cooma Railway at a time when the boom years of the 1880s were ending and funding for railway construction was decreasing.

The place is important in demonstrating aesthetic characteristics and/or a high degree of creative or technical achievement in New South Wales.

The viaduct is accessible from the Monaro Highway and is an impressive timber structure.

The place has strong or special association with a particular community or cultural group in New South Wales for social, cultural or spiritual reasons.

The Cooma Railway made a significant contribution to the development of the Monaro Region from the time of its construction 1887–89, and the three timber viaducts were important items of the railway's infrastructure.

The place has potential to yield information that will contribute to an understanding of the cultural or natural history of New South Wales.

The timber Queen post deck viaduct was a significant structure in place of the expensive iron lattice bridges preferred by John Whitton. The Bredbo viaduct were technically sound and durable, having been built from renowned ironbark hardwood.

The place possesses uncommon, rare or endangered aspects of the cultural or natural history of New South Wales.

These two timber viaducts on the Cooma Line, together with four on the Main North Line, are a unique class of railway bridge.

== See also ==
- List of railway bridges in New South Wales
- Works of John Whitton
