= Pindari Dam =

- Location of the Pindari Dam in New South Wales
- Country: Australia
- Location: North West Slopes, New South Wales
- Coordinates: 29°23′14″S 151°14′44″E
- Status: Operational
- Construction began: 1967
- Opening date: 1969
- Owner: State Water Corporation

Dam and spillways
- Type of dam: Rock-fill dam
- Impounds: Severn River
- Height: 85 m (279 ft)
- Length: 954 m (3,130 ft)
- Dam volume: 4,780 thousand cubic metres (169×10^{6} cu ft)
- Spillways: 1
- Spillway type: Uncontrolled rock cut with concrete sill
- Spillway capacity: 20,650 m^{3}/s (729,000 cu ft/s)

Reservoir
- Creates: Lake Pindari
- Total capacity: 312,000 ML (253,000 acre⋅ft)
- Catchment area: 2,000 km^{2} (770 sq mi)
- Surface area: 1,050 ha (2,600 acres)
- Maximum water depth: 73 m (240 ft)
- Normal elevation: 516 m (1,693 ft) AHD

Power Station
- Operator: Meridian Energy Australia Pty Limited
- Commission date: October 2001
- Type: Conventional
- Turbines: 2
- Installed capacity: 5.5 MW (7,400 hp)
- Annual generation: 16.3 GWh (59 TJ)
- Website; Pindari Dam at www.statewater.com.au

Pindari Dam is a minor embankment dam across the Severn River located upstream of the town of Ashford, in the North West Slopes region of New South Wales, Australia. The dam's purpose includes flood mitigation, hydro-power, irrigation, water supply and conservation. The impounded reservoir is called Lake Pindari.

== Location and features ==
Commenced in 1967 and completed in 1969, the Pindari Dam is a minor concrete-faced rock-filled dam on the (New South Wales branch of the) Severn River, and is located approximately 58 kilometres (36 mi) north of Inverell, on the upper reaches of the river, within the Border Rivers region. The dam was built by Citra Australia Limited under contract to the New South Wales Water Department of Land and Water Conservation.

The dam wall is 85 metres (279 ft) high and is 954 metres (3,130 ft) long. The maximum water depth is 73 metres (240 ft) and, when full, the reservoir has capacity of 312,000 megalitres (253,000 acre⋅ft) at 516 metres (1,693 ft) AHD. The surface area of Lake Pindari is 1,050 hectares (2,600 acres) and the catchment area is 2,000 square kilometres (770 sq mi). The ungated uncontrolled rock-cut with concrete sill spillway is capable of discharging 20,650 cubic metres per second (729,000 cu ft/s). An upgrade of facilities in 1995 involved doubling the height of the wall from its original 45 metres (148 ft) and increasing capacity to its current levels.

Pindari Dam is operated in conjunction with Queensland's Glenlyon Dam, located on the Dumaresq River, to supply NSW water users in the Border Rivers valley.

The name of the dam originates from the Aboriginal words meaning "high rock" and is the name of an early pastoral run which adjoined the reservoir.

=== Power generation ===
Completed in October 2001 at a cost of A$9.2 million, a conventional hydro-electric power station generates up to 5.5 megawatts (7,400 hp) of electricity from the flow of the water leaving Pindari Dam. Constructed by a consortium including Transfield and GE Energy, the facility is owned and operated by Meridian Energy Australia Pty Limited. The hydro project comprises two horizontal Francis turbines rated at 2.8 megawatts (3,800 hp) each and made in Norway, a single generator designed by GE Canada, and a transformer manufactured in Australia. The turbine is rated for 68 metres (223 ft) head with a maximum flow of approximately 1,000 megalitres (810 acre⋅ft) per day. The plant is fully automated and remote controlled. The plant's long-term average energy output has been estimated at 16.3 gigawatt-hours (59 TJ) of green energy per annum, enough to supply approximately 4,000 households.

== Recreation ==
Recreation activities on Lake Pindari include bushwalking, picnicking, sailing, swimming, fishing and waterskiing. The foreshore park is a popular local picnic site and camping area on a crown reserve, managed by Inverell Shire Council. There is a lookout on the main dam wall. Recreation facilities include a boat ramp, barbecues, bush shelter sheds and tables and toilets.

== See also ==
- Border Rivers
- Glenlyon Dam
- Irrigation in Australia
- List of dams and reservoirs in New South Wales
