= Bluff River (New South Wales) =

Coordinates: 29°15′S 152°01′E

Location
- Country: Australia
- IBRA: New England Tablelands
- District: Northern Tablelands
- Municipality: Tenterfield

Physical characteristics
- Source: Five Mile Creek (New South Wales)
  - location: below Sandy Flat
  - elevation: 750 m (2,460 ft)
- 2nd source: Seven Mile Creek (New South Wales)
- Mouth: confluence with Deepwater River to form Mole River
  - location: near Bluff River National Park
  - elevation: 604 m (1,982 ft)
- Length: 13 km (8.1 mi)

Basin features
- River system: Macintyre River, Murray–Darling basin

Bluff River, a mostly perennial stream of the Dumaresq–Macintyre catchment within the Murray–Darling basin, is located in the Northern Tablelands district of New South Wales, Australia.

The river takes its identity at the junction of Five Mile Creek and Seven Mile Creek, on the western slopes of the Great Dividing Range, below Sandy Flat, and flows generally northwest, north, and then southwest, before reaching its confluence with Deepwater River to form the Mole River, near Bluff River National Park, descending 146 metres (479 ft) over its 13 kilometres (8.1 mi) course.

== See also ==
- Rivers of New South Wales
- List of rivers of Australia
