= Sandy Flat, New South Wales =

Sandy Flat New South Wales
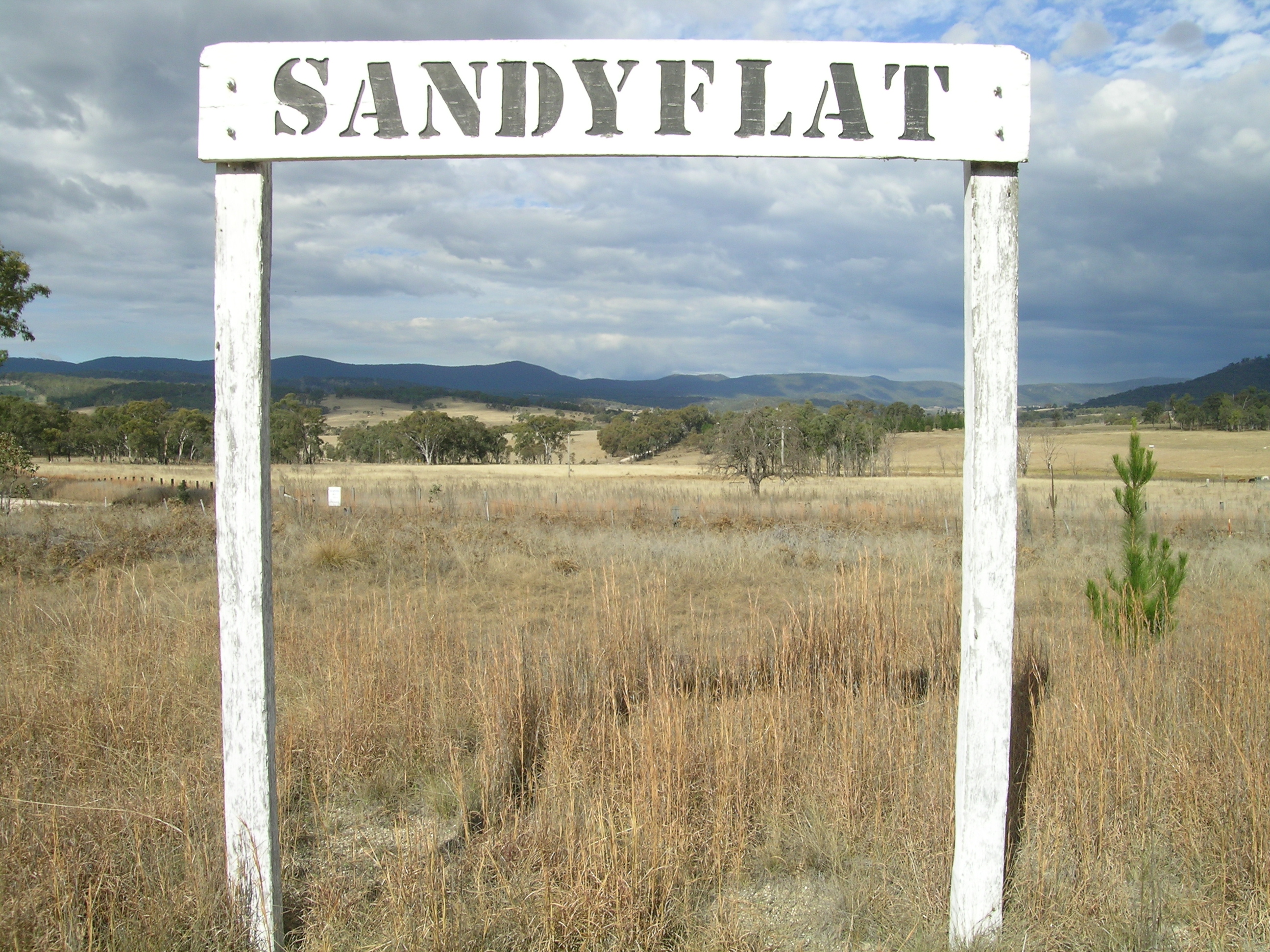
- Sandy Flat rail siding sign

- Coordinates: 29°15′S 151°59′E
- Population: 209 (2011 census)
- Postcode(s): 2372
- Elevation: 805 m (2,641 ft)
- Location: 751 km (467 mi) N of Sydney; 296 km (184 mi) SW of Brisbane; 169 km (105 mi) N of Glen Innes; 20 km (12 mi) S of Tenterfield; 28 km (17 mi) NE of Deepwater
- LGA(s): Tenterfield Shire
- County: Clive County
- State electorate(s): Lismore
- Federal division(s): New England

Sandy Flat is a historic locality on the Northern Tablelands in the New England region of New South Wales, Australia. This locality is situated on New England Highway and the former Main North Railway line about 20 kilometres south of Tenterfield. At the 2011 census, Sandy Flat had a population of 209 people.

Sandy Flat takes its name from a general description of the area. Nearby Bluff Rock is a commonly photographed landmark along the New England Highway.

== History ==
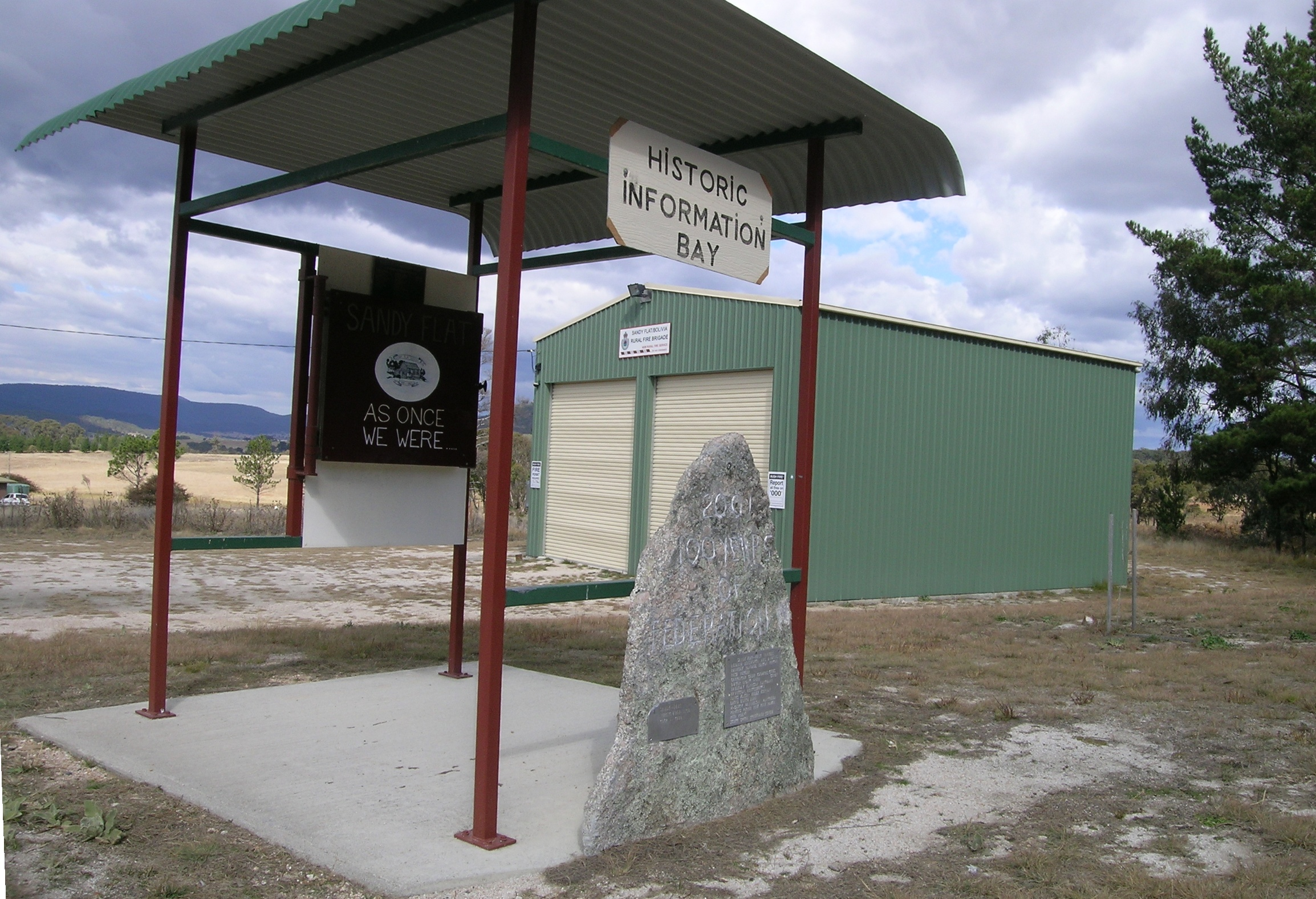
Sandy Flat information bay and RFS shed

The original inhabitants of the land were Aborigines of the Kamilaroi clan.

Early community life at Sandy Flat for generations centred on a school (1886–1965), a public hall, a church, a general store and during construction of the railway line during the 1880s the community also had its own hotel. The Main Northern Railway line to Jennings opened on 1 September 1886 and the station at Sandy Flat closed on 20 February 1975. Sandy Flat Post Office opened on 20 June 1887.

The Bluff River Rail Bridge at Sandy Flat, designed by John Whitton, is listed on the Register of the National Estate. It consists of 10-span timber deck Queen Post truss viaduct, with each span measuring 42 feet (13 m). When completed in 1886 it was the second longest timber truss bridge in Australia.

Remains of the Sandy Flat community comprises the remains of the former rail siding, a disused post office building and a modern New South Wales Rural Fire Service shed together with an information stand. There are some scattered agricultural properties in the surrounding area.

== Sports ==
Apart from facilities for the more traditional sports such as tennis, cricket and football the Sandy Flat Rifle Range provided many hours of recreation for men around the time of World War I. The 1,000 yard range was opened in 1913 with a telephone connection and a substantial weather shelter for its sixty or so members.

== Industries ==
Local industries include merino sheep breeding and beef cattle farms.

== Sandy Flat railway station ==
Preceding station	Former services	Following station
Tenterfield towards Wallangarra	Main North Line	Bolivia towards Sydney
