= Beardy Waters =

Coordinates: 29°37′07″S 151°46′00″E

Beardy Waters Maybole Creek, The Beardy Water, Beardy River, The Beardy Waters
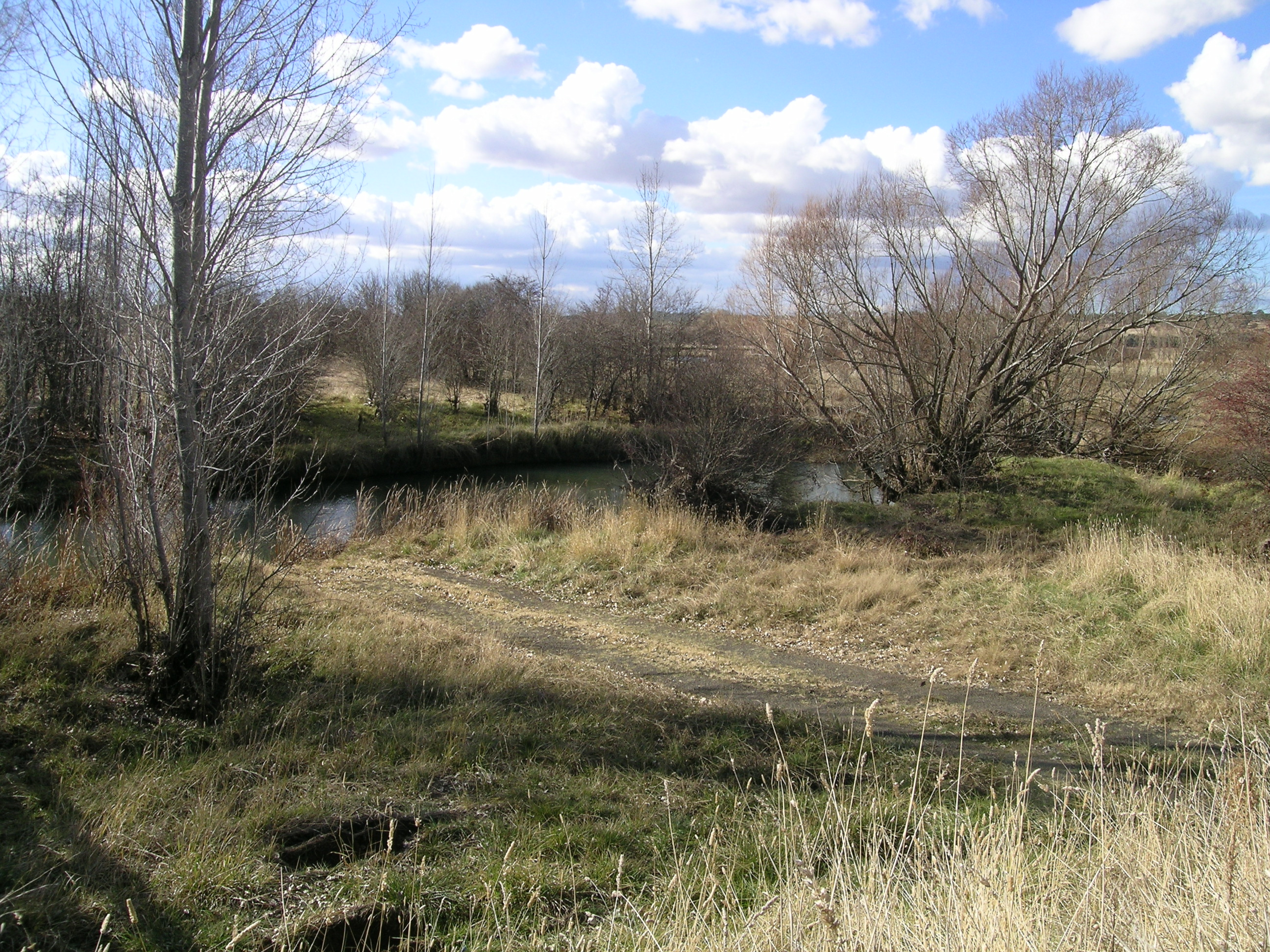
- Beardy Waters at Stonehenge, NSW
- Etymology: In honour of two bearded stockmen, William Chandler and John Duval

Location
- Country: Australia
- State: New South Wales
- IBRA: New England Tablelands
- District: New England
- Municipality: Glen Innes Severn

Physical characteristics
- Source: Waterloo Range, Great Dividing Range
  - location: near Glen Innes
  - elevation: 1,200 m (3,900 ft)
- Mouth: confluence with the Severn River (NSW)
  - elevation: 884 m (2,900 ft)
- Length: 76 km (47 mi)

Basin features
- River system: Macintyre River. Murray–Darling basin

Beardy Waters, a watercourse and part of the Macintyre catchment within the Murray–Darling basin, is located in the Northern Tablelands region of New South Wales, Australia.

== Etymology ==
The name of the river derives from two bearded stockmen, William Chandler and John Duval, who were among the first European settlers of the district through which the river flows. The river was previously known as Maybole Creek, The Beardy Water, Beardy River and The Beardy Waters.

== Course ==
Beardy Waters rises below the Waterloo Range and Great Dividing Range, and flows generally north-east then north, before reaching its confluence with the Severn River, north of Glen Innes, descending 317 metres (1,040 ft) over its 76 kilometres (47 mi) course.

A weir construction across the Beardy Waters was commenced in October 1930 after a grant of £5,500 was made available for the work. This money was granted to pay men working on unemployment relief. Completed in July 1932 at a cost of £10,847 it has a capacity of 100 million imperial gallons (450,000 m^{3}) with the flood gates closed.

== See also ==
- Rivers of New South Wales
- List of rivers of Australia
