= Severn River (New South Wales) =

River in New South Wales, Australia

Severn
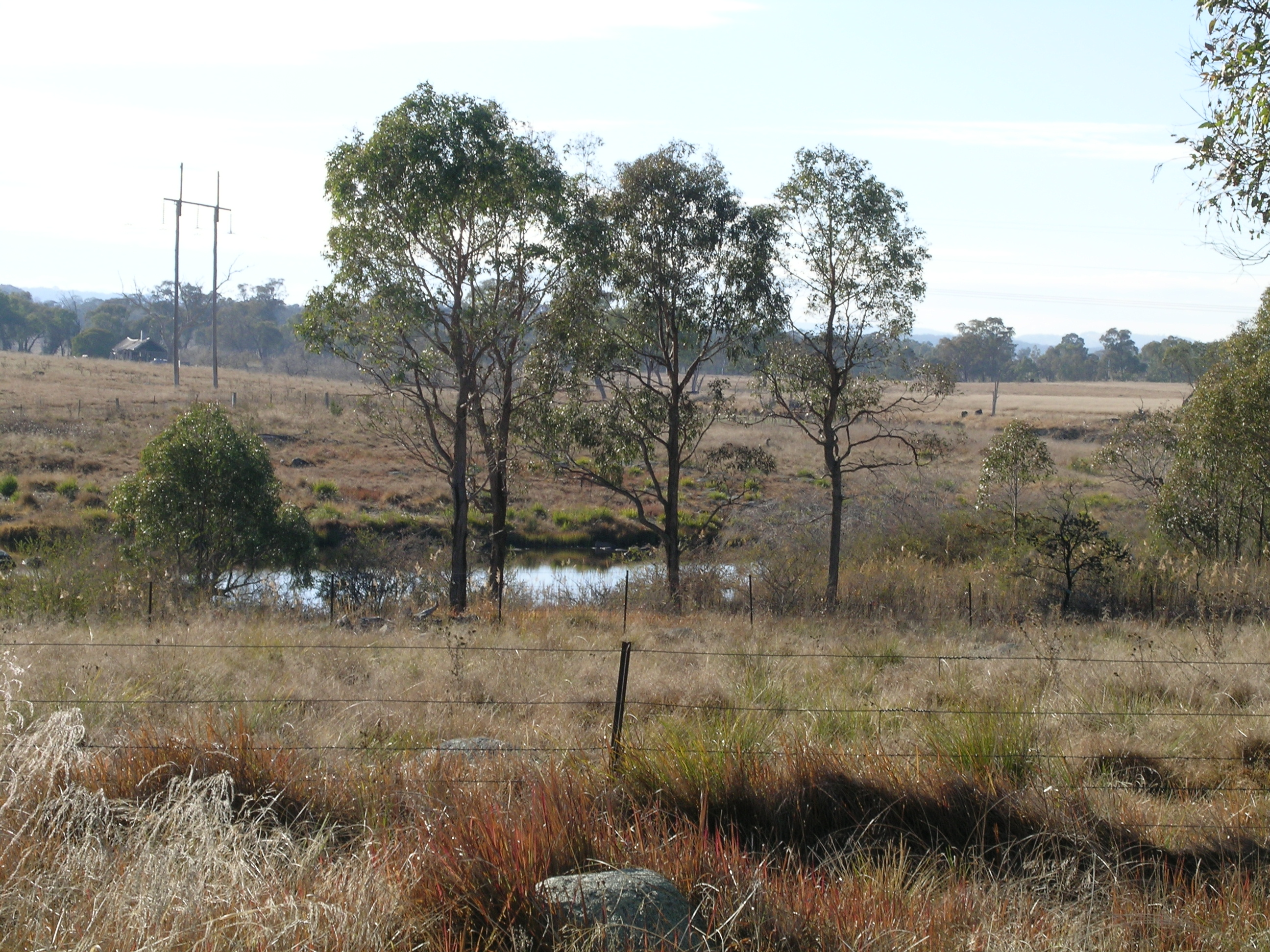
- Severn River, at Dundee

- Location of Severn River (NSW) mouth in New South Wales
- Etymology: After Severn Valley (England)

Location
- Country: Australia
- State: New South Wales
- Regions: Northern Tablelands, North West Slopes

Physical characteristics
- Source: Great Dividing Range
  - location: northeast of Glen Innes
  - coordinates: 29°38′12″S 151°56′52″E
  - elevation: 1,110 m (3,640 ft)
- Mouth: confluence with the Macintyre River
  - location: north of Wallangra
  - coordinates: 29°07′40″S 150°58′06″E
  - elevation: 284 m (932 ft)
- Length: 205 km (127 mi)

Basin features
- River system: Macintyre River catchment, Murray–Darling basin
- Tributaries
  - left: Beardy Waters
- Reservoir: Lake Pindari

The Severn River, a perennial river that forms part of the Border Rivers group, is part of the Macintyre catchment of the Murray–Darling basin, located in the Northern Tablelands and North West Slopes regions of New South Wales, Australia.

== Course and features ==
The river rises on the western slopes of the Great Dividing Range, north of Glen Innes and flows generally northwest, joined by eleven tributaries, including Beardy Waters, and impounded by Lake Pindari, near Ashford. The river reaches its confluence with the Macintyre River, north of Wallangra, descending 825 metres (2,707 ft) over its 205-kilometre (127 mi) course.

=== Recreation ===
The Severn River flows through Kwaimbal National Park. A rare plant, the Severn River heath-myrtle is restricted to the Severn River Nature Reserve and an adjacent property, about 60 kilometres (37 mi) north-west of Glen Innes.

Excellent fishing can be found along the river and is regularly stocked with native fingerlings, Murray cod and golden perch.

The Severn River Rail Bridge on the now disused Main North Railway Line, 6 kilometres (3.7 mi) west-south-west of Dundee has been placed on the Register of the National Estate. This bridge consists of a series of timber trusses completed in 1886 and is long, with fifteen spans totalling 159 metres (522 ft). When completed it was the longest timber truss bridge in Australia.

== See also ==
- Rivers of New South Wales
- Severn River (Queensland)
