= Bredbo River =

Coordinates: 35°58′S 149°08′E

Bredbo
- Etymology: Aboriginal: joining of waters

Location
- Country: Australia
- State: New South Wales
- Region: IBRA: South Eastern Highlands
- District: Monaro
- Municipality: Cooma-Monaro

Physical characteristics
- Source: Bald Mountain
  - location: north east of Cooma
  - elevation: 1,380 m (4,530 ft)
- Mouth: Murrumbidgee River
  - location: near Bredbo
  - elevation: 695 m (2,280 ft)
- Length: 52 km (32 mi)

Basin features
- River system: Murray–Darling basin
- Tributaries
  - left: Celeys Creek, Cowra Creek, Birchams Creek
  - right: Cutmore Creek, Frogs Hole Creek, Strike-a-Light River, Cappanana Creek

Bredbo River, a perennial stream that is part of the Murrumbidgee catchment within the Murray–Darling basin, is located in the Monaro region of New South Wales, Australia.

== Location and features ==
The river rises on the western slopes of the Great Dividing Range at Bald Hill and flows generally west, joined by seven tributaries including Strike-a-Light River, before reaching its confluence with the Murrumbidgee River about 8 kilometres (5.0 mi) south–east of Bredbo, descending 688 metres (2,257 ft) over its 52-kilometre (32 mi) course.

The river flows through the town of Bredbo, from where it draws its name, an Aboriginal word meaning joining of waters.

== See also ==
- List of rivers of Australia § New South Wales
