= Bigambul =

Aboriginal Australian ethnic group

Bigambul people
- aka: Bigabul, Pikambul, Bigambal, Preagalgh, Wigal-wollumbul, Wee-n' gul-la-m' bul

Hierarchy
- Language family: Pama–Nyungan
- Language branch: Wiradhuric
- Language group: Gamilaraay; Bigambul
- Group dialects: Gambuwal; Kwiambal / Gujambal

Area (approx. 26,500 sq. km)
- Bioregion: Northern Tablelands and Border Rivers
- Location: New South Wales – Queensland border
- Coordinates: 28°10′S 150°10′E
- Rivers: Weir River; Moonie River; Macintyre River; Middle Creek
- Other geological: Boobera Lagoon; Kwiambal National Park

Notable individuals
- Chris Sandow

The Bigambul people are an Aboriginal Australian people of the Northern Tablelands and Border Rivers regions of New South Wales and Queensland.

== Name ==
In the traditional language, the name of this group is derived from the Bigambul word biga or pika which translates in English to yes. The Bigambul are bounded to the south–east by the Ngarabal, the Kamilaroi to the south, the Kooma to the west, the Mandandanji and Kabi to the north, and the Baruŋgam to the north–east.

== Country ==
Norman Tindale ascribed to the Bigambul a traditional territory spreading over 26,500 square kilometres (10,200 sq mi) east of Nindigully, on the Weir and Moonie rivers, north to Tara; at Talwood; on the Macintyre River from east of Boomi to Texas; at Yetman, Boggabilla, and at Middle Creek.

== Alternate names ==
- Bigabul
- Pikambul
- Bigambal
- Bigambel
- Bee-gum-bul
- Bigumble
- Pikumbul,'Pikumpal, Pikambal
- Pikum-bul, Pickum-bul, Pickimbul
- Pickumble, Picumbul, Pikumbil
- Begumble
- Peekumble
- Pickumbil
- Picumbill
- Preagalgh
- Wigal-wollumbul
- Wee-n' gul-la-m' bul

Source: Tindale 1974, p. 166

== Clans ==
The Bigambul have a cultural connection with the northern Kamilaroi people and these people regularly participated in joint ceremonies at Boobera Lagoon.

== Language ==
The Australian Institute for Aboriginal and Torres Strait Islander Studies states that the Bigambul language was used by the Bigambul people, with Gambuwal and Kwiambal (or Gujambal) known dialects. However, it is more likely that the Gamilaraay (or Yuwaaliyaay) language was used by those peoples living in southern Bigambul territory.

== History of contact ==
The Bigambul people actively opposed European colonisation of their territory. From the early 1840s they mounted a 14–year guerrilla campaign to expel the settlers. The Bigambul leadership understood the importance of economics in warfare and they specifically targeted horses and cattle rather than just the settlers themselves. The campaign was initially successful with 17 selections being abandoned in Macintyre region in 1843, of which only 13 were re-occupied when Europeans returned 3 years later. The economic war was so successful that it is recorded that one selection was making a loss of £150 per year until 1849. The tide of the campaign turned in 1848 when the Governor set aside £1000 to form the Native Police and appointed Frederick Walker to command them. Walker took the battle to the Bigambul, attacking them in their camps with his stated objective being their annihilation. By 1851 the economic war was effectively over, land values in the area doubled and the wages paid by settlers to employees were halved. Most of the work done on selections in the area was performed by Aborigines in return for food rations. By 1854 only 100 of the Bigambul people were left alive.

== Native title ==
On 23 February 2001 the Bigambul people lodged a successful native title claim over 24,188 square kilometres (9,339 sq mi) in South Western Queensland.

== Notable Bigambul people ==
- Chris Sandow – a professional rugby league footballer

== Sources ==
- "Bigambul language (D34) (Qld SH56-01)". Language and Peoples Thesaurus. AIATSIS. 2010. Archived from the original on 2 April 2012.
- Copeland, Mark (9–10 December 1999). The Native Police at Callandoon- A Blueprint for Forced Assimilation? (PDF). History of Crime, Policing and Punishment Conference. Australian Institute of Criminology and Charles Sturt University. pp. 1–13. Archived from the original (PDF) on 12 February 2014.
- Howitt, Alfred William (1904). The native tribes of south-east Australia (PDF). Macmillan.
- "Indigenous All Stars team named" (Press release). National Rugby League. 7 December 2011. Archived from the original on 4 March 2012.
- "Kwiambal National Park". NSW National Parks & Wildlife Service.
- Lauterer, J. (1897). "The Aboriginal languages of eastern Australia compared". Proceedings of the Royal Society of Queensland. 12: 11–16. doi:10.5962/p.351257. S2CID 257134113.
- MacPherson, J. (1904). "Ngarrabul and other aboriginal tribes: distribution of tribes". Proceedings of the Linnean Society of New South Wales. 29: 677–684. doi:10.5962/bhl.part.20175.
- "Map of NSW Aboriginal Languages". New South Wales Department of Aboriginal Affairs. 14 May 2012. Archived from the original on 27 March 2012.
- Mathews, R. H. (1902). "Languages of some native tribes of Queensland, New South Wales, and Victoria". Proceedings of the Royal Society of New South Wales. 36: 135–190. doi:10.5962/p.359384. S2CID 259672570.
- "National Native Title Tribunal: Bigambul People Claimant application". National Native Title Tribunal. Archived from the original on 2 September 2006.
- Ridley, William (1861). "Journal of a Missionary Tour Among the Aborigines of the Western Interior of Queensland in the Year 1855" (PDF). In Lang, Gideon S. (ed.). The Aborigines of Australia. London: Edward Stanford. pp. 435–445.
- Tindale, Norman Barnett (1974). "Bigambul (QLD)". Aboriginal Tribes of Australia: Their Terrain, Environmental Controls, Distribution, Limits, and Proper Names. Australian National University.
- Wyndham, W. T. (1889). "The Aborigines of Australia". Journal and Proceedings of the Royal Society of New South Wales. 23: 36–42. doi:10.5962/p.359061. S2CID 259593957.
