= Glen Innes Showground =

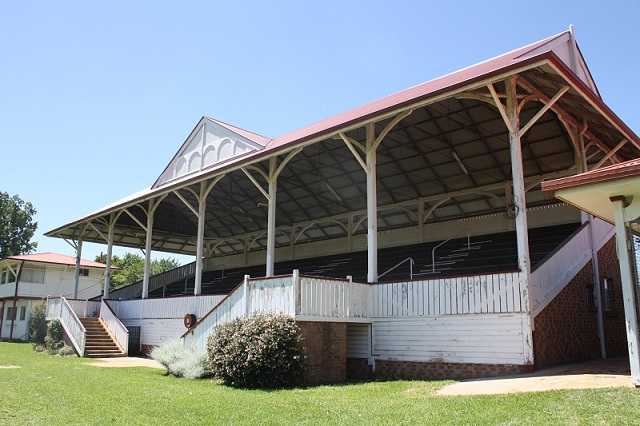
- Grandstands at the showground

- Location within New South Wales Location within Australia
- 29.7418°S 151.7436°E
- Location: Bourke Street, Glen Innes, Glen Innes Severn, New South Wales, Australia

History
- Built: 1873–

Site notes
- Architect(s): Thompson and Holmes JPO'Connor; Rowland Bros; Madigan and Cusick

New South Wales Heritage Register
- Official name: Glen Innes Showground; Pastoral and Agricultural Showground Glen Innes
- Type: state heritage (complex / group)
- Designated: 4 September 2015
- Reference no.: 1961
- Type: Showground
- Category: Community Facilities
- Builders: AW Lane, G Cooper, HA Tutt and Son

Glen Innes Showground is a heritage-listed showground at Bourke Street, Glen Innes, in the New England region of New South Wales, Australia. It was designed by various architects, including Thompson and Holmes, J. P. O'Connor, Rowland Bros and Madigan and Cusick. It was built from 1873 by various builders, including A. W. Lane, G. Cooper and H. A. Tutt and Son. It was added to the New South Wales State Heritage Register on 4 September 2015.

== History ==
=== Indigenous and early colonial use ===
Pre European settlement, the area around Glen Innes was the traditional land of the Ngarabal people, whose totem was the koala. Their land extended to include current towns of Glencoe, Kingsplains, Wellingrove, Strathbogie, Bolivia and Beardy Plains. Due to the severity of the winters in the area and the consequent reduction in food resources, the people migrated away from the high tableland area during the coldest months to the warmer regions along tributaries to the Clarence River in the south and east and the Mole district in the west. The population again swelled during the summer months as the Ngarabal returned to feast on wallaby, bandicoots, possum, lizards, birds and many other creatures. Wild berries including the local wild raspberry, peach heath, wattle, roots of the bracken fern, native yam and native asparagus, were among other plants that augmented their diet and provided medicinal treatment. Those too old or to weak to undertake the migration stayed on the high tablelands and protected themselves from the cold by wearing Possum or Kangaroo skin cloaks and tending large camp fires established close to their bark huts.

While tribal boundaries were clearly drawn and incursion of these often provoked fierce battles, there was also movement of neighbouring Clarence River/Macleay River Aboriginal tribes and those of the western districts up to theNgarabal tribal lands near Glen Innes for corroborees, to trade goods information and also for marriage and initiation purposes. Goods traded included ochre, sourced near Dundee in the Glen Innes area and stone from creeks in tribal lands to the south.

In 1818, during his journey from Bathurst to the Macquarie Marshes, thence to the Liverpool Plains and Port Macquarie, John Oxley first reported sighting Aboriginal people in the New England area. While Oxley met with some Aboriginal men, women and children were kept hidden. Similarly in 1827 while making his journey of exploration through to the Darling Downs region, Richard Cunningham noted signs of indigenous habitation but rarely saw or met with Aboriginal people. After coming upon cattle and a European hut Cunningham surmised that Aboriginal people may have had a bad experience of some white men and chose to avoid them.

Avoiding White settlers became increasingly difficult for the Aboriginal people of the area after 1830. At this time the Australian Agricultural Company took up vast estates north of the Hunter Valley on the Liverpool Plains. With the large agricultural company in possession of this land, new squatters were forced to seek seeking new lands further north, including in the New England area. In 1838 Thomas Hewitt took up Stonehenge located south of present Glen Innes, for Archibald Boyd. In 1839 a New England Pastoral district was formed with Commissioner MacDonald based at Armidale.

The early years of settlement in the Glen Innes area was marked by mixed relations between Aboriginal people and the new colonists. Inevitably, as the Aboriginal people were increasingly locked out of their traditional hunting grounds, there were many incidents of conflict between Aboriginals and whites farmers. Aboriginal people on occasion took stock as compensation for the decimation of their traditional food resources. On other occasions they would attempt to drive stock off their traditional lands and in some cases European shepherds were killed. Settlers in return chased Aboriginal people from their farms and in a number of cases between 1839 and 1842 killed Aboriginal people en masse. This happened on the Beardy Plains, at Deepwater Station and at Bluff Rock in the vicinity of Glen Innes.

In the 1840s towns were established along the Tablelands and initially a government town was established at Wellingrove. Unlike the village of Glen Innes, Wellingrove did not thrive and in January 1858 the Court of Petty Sessions was moved to Glen Innes. Other businesses then followed. It was in December 1851 that Surveyor J. J. Galloway surveyed a town sites at Glen Innes and Stonehenge. In the early 1870s, Glen Innes developed rapidly following the discovery of tin in the district. New stores and hotels were constructed in the town and a number of social and professional organisations were established in Glen Innes including the Pastoral and Agricultural Association which was initially established in conjunction with Inverell.

=== Showground ===
Pastoralism was an essential element in the development of the local, regional and national economies. Livestock production influenced the development of pastoral stations and modified the landscape in Glen Innes as elsewhere in NSW and Australia. The successful development of pastoralism in the area led the establishment of the Inverell-Glen Innes Pastoral and Agricultural Association which worked hard to establish a local Show where stock could be displayed and judged. The first show to be held in the Glen Innes district was in 1869 at Inverell and the 1870 show was held at Glen Innes, near the Glen Innes Primary School.

The first show to be held on the current showground site was in 1874. This date indicates that Glen Innes was one of the earliest shows to be established and continuously operating on its site outside metropolitan Sydney. Other early regional showgrounds in continuous use are Maitland which held its first show at its current site in 1873, Singleton, which held its first show on its current site in 1868, Bathurst, which held the first show on site in 1878, and Armidale show began on its current site in 1877. The joint Inverell-Glen Innes Pastoral and Agricultural Association remained operational until 1876 when, after a less successful show which went into debt to the tune of 144 pounds, Glen Innes members decided to establish an independent Association. The Government of New South Wales formally gazetted the present showground site in 1877. This site became an important part of the Town Plan.

The first president of the Glen Innes Pastoral and Agricultural was William Alexander Dumaresq, the son of the well-known, and at times notorious colonial figure and brother-in-law to Governor Darling, Captain William John Dumaresq. William John Dumaresq was made provisional civil engineer and inspector of roads and bridges by Governor Darling and at one stage was acting colonial Treasurer. He and his brother Henry amassed large, profitable land holdings in both the Hunter and the New England tablelands, Saumarez and Tilbuster being those in the New England. His son William Alexander Dumaresq served as an Australian Army Officer in India, married the sister-in-law of Governor Somerset Lowry-Corry, 4th Earl Belmore and was a wealthy grazier in the Glen Innes district.

Another important association for the Glen Innes Pastoral and Agricultural Association was with W. T. Cadell and Deepwater Station. Deepwater Station was initially taken up by noted landowner and pastoralist Archibald Windeyer junior in 1839 and rapidly developed into a prosperous station which made a large contribution to NSW fine merino wool exports. On his demise in 1870 the station was purchased by a family company representing the union of several NSW and Queensland pastoral dynasties, the Windmyers, the Macansh family and W. T. Cadell who had married into the Macansh family. It was Cadell who was the hands-on sheep and cattle breeder and he successfully improved the Deepwater herd and flock to such an extent that Deepwater wool was regarded as the finest in the NSW market and regularly fetched top price. Cadell became official patron and sponsor of the Glen Innes Show in 1903. In this role he worked tirelessly to "advance the Glen Innes Pastoral and Agricultural Society to a leading place in NSW".

The first buildings to be built at Glen Innes Showground were a Grandstand and an Exhibition Hall for the 1874 Show. As the annual show continued to grow in terms of both attendance and exhibition these initial buildings were extended and stock yards built. A mark of the popular success of the show was the organisation of excursion trains from Tamworth and Tenterfield to ferry eager show goers to the Glen Innes Show. In 1888 a grand new entrance to the showgrounds was opened on Torrington Street.

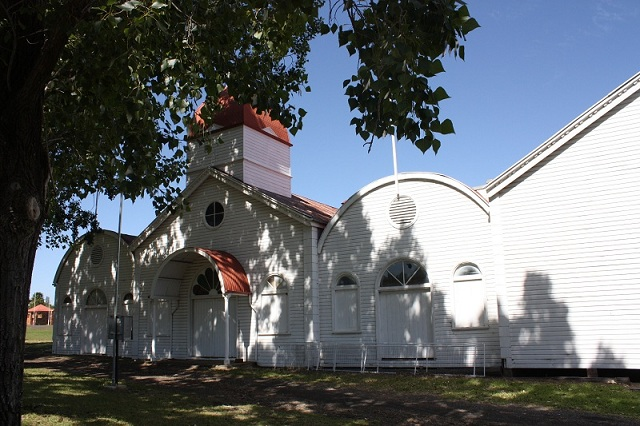
Main exhibition pavilion

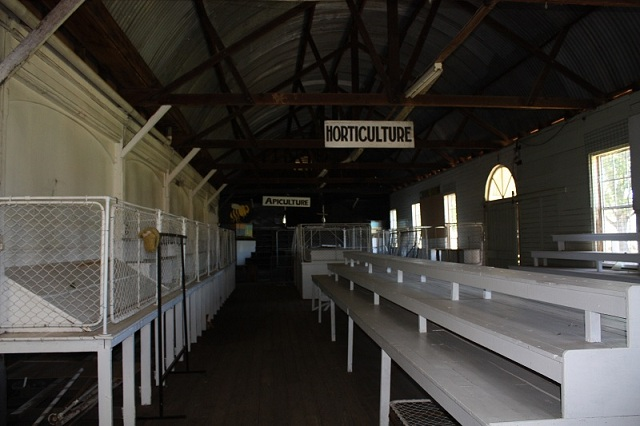
Main Exhibition Pavilion interior

By 1892 the original Exhibition Hall had seen its best years and was replaced by the existing, attractive Victorian free classical style Main Exhibition Pavilion. Similarly in 1896 the original grandstand was removed and replaced by the Federation Carpenter style grandstand which eventually opened for use in 1899 and is still in situ. The timber from the original grandstand was used to construct the caretakers cottage. In 1897, to celebrate Queen Victoria's Jubilee, a program of tree planting began and the grounds were lit for the first time. The tree planting program was continued over the years, funded by financial and in-kind donations and by the takings of the annual show. The planting program has resulted in the well maintained park-like showground.

As a marker of the progress of the show and of its reputation through NSW, by the end of the 19th century is the fact that on several occasions the annual Glen Innes Show was opened or attended by various dignitaries. Show openings were officiated by Premier of New South Wales Sir George Dibbs in 1893; the Governor of NSW, Admiral Sir Harry Rawson in 1903; the NSW Premier, Joseph Carruthers in 1904; and NSW Premier Charles Wade in 1909. The prestige of the show and its success reached its zenith in 1922 when it was widely recognised as the leading annual show in NSW with buildings and exhibition facilities rivalling those at other showgrounds through NSW. During the middle decades of the 20th century it became something of a "tradition" for dignitaries to open the Glen Innes show with NSW Premier, Bertram Stevens opening the 1934 Show; Earle Page opening the 1939 Glen Innes Show and veteran politician Hubert Lawrence Anthony opened the 1941 Show.

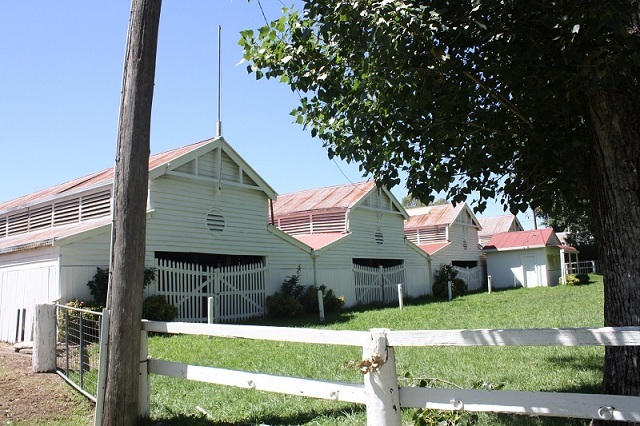
Cattle pavilion

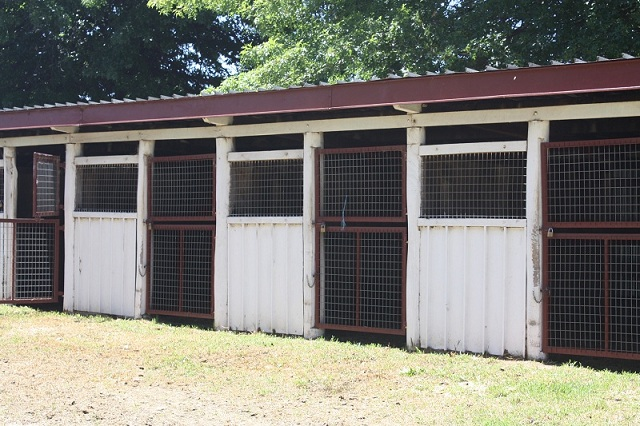
Stables

The early years of the 20th century also saw a spate of building projects with Rowland Bros architects designing an additional pavilion for the showground in 1905, extensive stables buildings in 1906 and J. F. O'Connor, architect, preparing plans and supervising construction of the cattle pavilion between 1909 and 1910. New entrance gates were erected in 1911. In 1922 a major addition to the Main Exhibition Pavilion was designed by architect F. J. Madigan, a widely noted architect and mentor for his son, Colin Madigan. In that same year the sheep pavilion was completed and a new piggery and a new refreshment room was constructed. The new buildings at the showground used designs sympathetic to the buildings already established on the grounds. This dedication to creating a cohesive suite of architect-designed buildings has extended to the design and construction of buildings at Glen Innes Showground through the history of the showgrounds.

Late in 1922, after officially opening the show seated in his car as he could not stand, W. T. Cadell died. His dedication to the establishing the best show in NSW was memorialised in the erection of the Cadell Memorial sheep rotunda which was opened in 1927 by Michael Bruxner MLA.

During the 1930s the showgrounds were extended with the purchase of two extra acres of land. The Caged Bird Pavilion was erected and a public address system installed. Further developments were cut short by the onset of World War II during which the showground was occupied by the Army. While the 1941 show went ahead, by 1942 the grounds were in Army control and there was no show. The next show to be held was in 1946. In preparation 1944 and 1945 were spent restoring the grounds and facilities after the military use.

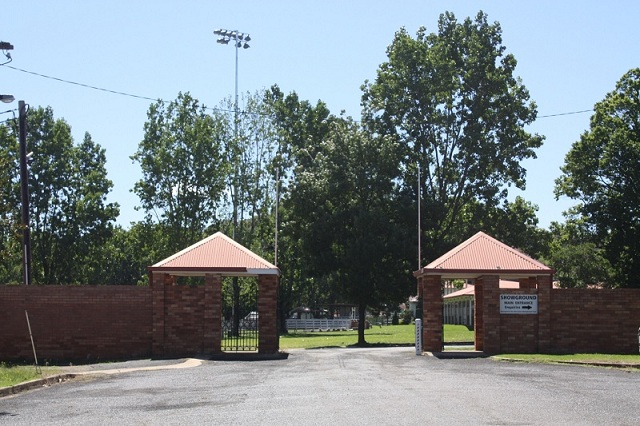
Entry gates

The 1950s saw a further 2 acre purchase of land to enlarge the showgrounds and also the installation of a Ringside Broadcast Box, horse and cattle stalls and further plantings. By this time the suite of buildings that now characterises the Glen Innes Showground were in place. The exception was the 1991 bar and barbeque, designed to complement the neighbouring grandstand, and the new entrance gates on Bourke Street. The 1960s and 1970s saw the continued care and interest in tree planting in the grounds, the establishment of the Industrial pavilion in 1974 and then in the 2000s the Men's Shed was erected near the Torrington St entrance.

The changing nature of pastoralism and related agricultural activities in the Glen Innes area was reflected at the annual show. Initially sheep, beef cattle and horses were paraded and judged. As small farming developed maize, wheat and other cash crops were exhibited as well as dairy herds, pig farms and poultry farms.

In time related secondary industries were developed in the town and appeared at the show. Wheat growing led to the development of Flour Mills in Glen Innes; dairy herds led to the development of butter and cheese factories; horses led to the development of blacksmiths, coach companies and coach manufacturing businesses. The development of these industries explains the construction of the Hall of Industries in 1922 and the Industrial Pavilion in 1974.

Such an evolution of activities was repeated all over NSW in the context of the local agricultural endeavours. Unfortunately, unlike the Glen Innes showground which has retained the full suite of show buildings, many other NSW showgrounds have not retained the built evidence of this evolution. The showground at Glen Innes is one of the few showgrounds with intact buildings and facilities reflecting its regional agricultural and industrial development.

== Description ==
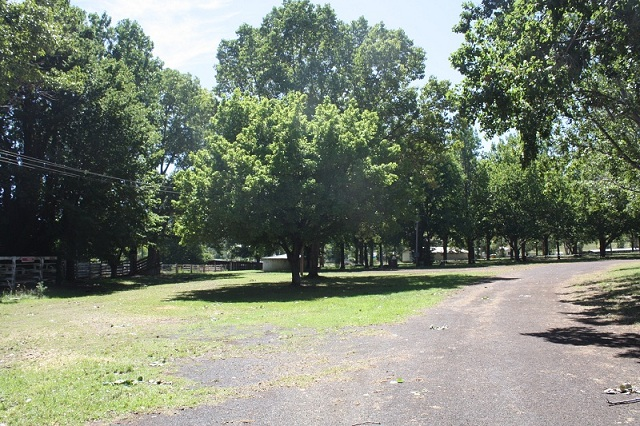
Park-like setting

In 2006 the buildings and facilities included a grandstand; old timber pavilion; Trade pavilion; Yarraford Hall; stud cattle pavilions; bar and barbecue facilities; 167 horse stalls; tea room seating 100; a new pavilion for basketball; four stand shearing complex; prime cattle yards; caged birds pavilion; show secretary's office; showring and camping ground, park-like landscaped grounds.

Main Exhibition Pavilion

The Main Exhibition pavilion was built in 1892. The one storey Main Exhiobition Pavilions timber pavilions are clad framed, four joined sections with domed tower, round headed windows, iron roof gabled and domed, timber walls with rear and side walls constructed of corrugated iron; quoins timber routed; timber footings; iron columns; ceiling King post trussed, walls horizontal; tongued and grooved timber, timber floors; windows one and four paned; doors tongued and grooved panels; fanlight; gas lamp side door: domed porch front entrance.

Grandstand

The main timber grandstand was completed and opened at the 1899 Armidale-Glen Innes Combined District Show. Built of hardwood and covered with corrugated iron, the main building had a ground surface of 58 by 30 feet; a height of 24 feet from plate to plate, giving a roof projection of five feet, with an ornamental front gable. The stand provided seating for 350 people. Designed by Sydney architects, Thompson and Holmes, the work was supervised by Glen Innes builder A. W. Lane.

Industrial Pavilion

A new building, the Industrial Pavilion 84 feet long and 35 feet wide, was erected on the northern side alongside the older pavilion and opened in March 1922. The wall between the pavilions was removed to provide additional space. Tallowood was used for the floor to also enable it to be used as a dance floor. The pavilion was designed by F. J. Madigan, of the Glen Innes firm Madigan and Cusick, and constructed by G. Cooper. Its primary purpose was to provide facilities for trade displays on a generous scale.

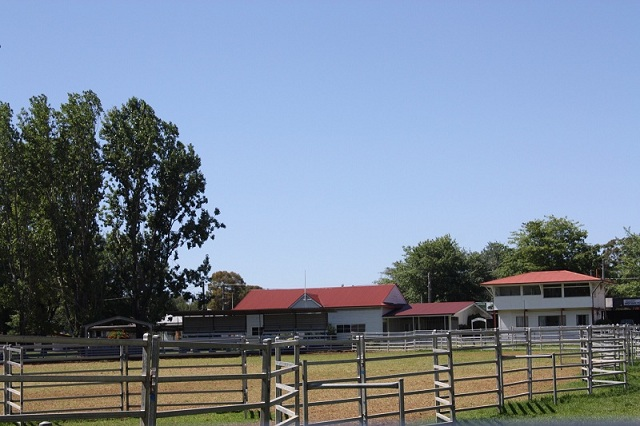
View to refreshment rooms and show society office

Refreshment room and piggery

Other improvements in 1921 included the construction of a refreshment room and a new piggery with fourteen stalls.

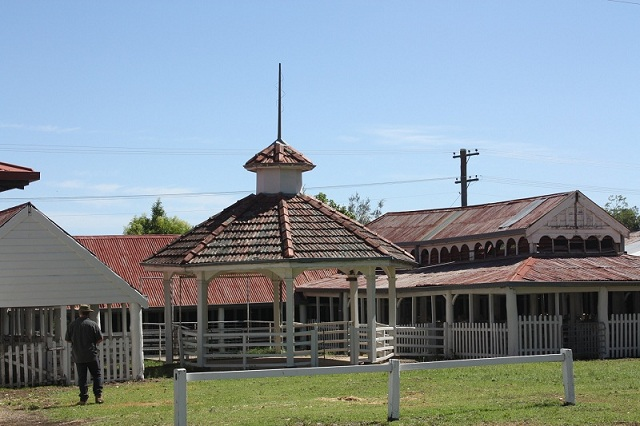
Sheep pavilion and rotunda

Cadell Memorial Rotunda

The ornate Cadell Memorial sheep-judging stand (1928) is of octagonal shape with a 27 feet measurement between the most distant corners. The stand is erected of hardwood posts built into a concrete foundation. It is a timber structure with terra cotta tiled roof. The design makes maximum use of light with a domed ceiling, lantern roof and glass louvres converging to a central flag-staff. The contractors were H. A. Tutt and Son of Glen Innes.

Landscape setting

The show buildings and central arena are set in a 7-acre planned and maintained park-like setting. Plantings include a large number of trees, eucalypts, elms and pines planted in 1897 in preparation for Queen Victoria's Jubilee celebrations. A large number of trees were donated by the Department for Mines and Agriculture for planting at the showground in 1898. These early plantings formed the skeleton of the landscape grounds with were maintained and added to over the years. In 1910 a local man, George Black donated 20 pine trees which were planted along the George Street boundary of the ground and can be clearly seen in early showground photographs.

By 1950s the grounds were well developed and while a plantation of elms was established behind the sheep pavilion, a nest of blackberry bushes was eradicated in the north eastern corner of the grounds and the pine trees growing to the west of the Main Exhibition pavilion were cut down. In 1958 a big tree planting program was carried out and blackberries were once again becoming a problem to be dealt with. By 1962 they were no longer a problem and the fence line at the north east corner of the grounds was extended out to enclose the area where the blackberries had been.

In 1964 and 1966 another planting program provided a large number of ring side trees. By 1969 it was reported that there were 250 trees were growing in the showground in addition to a number of yellow box and white gum.

In 1974 the George Street pine trees were cut down and then in 1977 more pine trees were removed from behind the fat cattle pavilion . In this year the arena was regrassed with kiluyu grass donated and maintained by the local high school. In 1897 several old white gums were removed.

Today the showground landscaping is characterised by copses of elms, eucalypts, including yellow box and white gum and other trees. Elms shade the Main Exhibition Pavilion and ring the arena.

=== Condition and integrity ===
As at December 2014, a number of the structures had been assessed as needing urgent conservation work, including the pavilions and the Cadell Memorial sheep judging stand. These structures have archaeological value as they provide an insight into early bushcraft skills as well as the skills of note country architects.

Glen Innes showground has a high degree of intactness.

=== Modifications and dates ===
The original grandstand was removed in 1896 and the timber used in constructing a caretaker's residence.

Additions were made to the present grandstand in 1907.

A picket fence was once installed in front of the grandstand but is now removed.

A Hall of Industries was completed on the northern side of the 1890s pavilion in 1922.

The Tea Room Drill Hall was demolished in the 1950s.

Remodelling of the main entrances took place in 1988.

Columns and whole entry complex was remodelled in 1990 following damage to the overhead sign and pillars by heavy and high trucks.

== Heritage listing ==
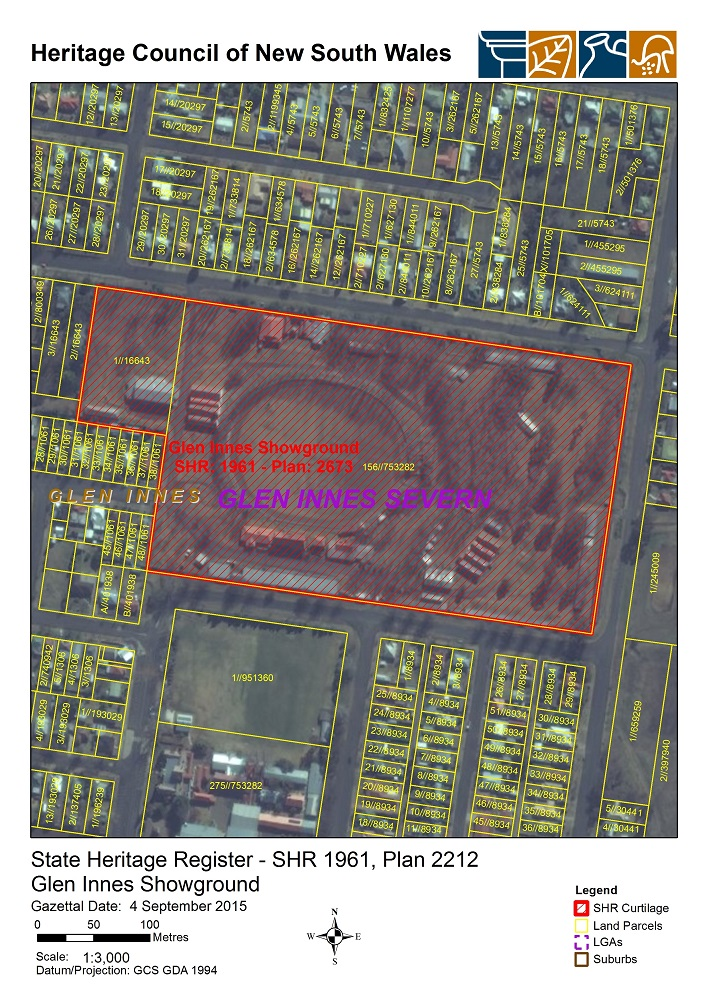
Heritage boundaries

Glen Innes Showground is of state heritage significance as one of the earliest regional shows to be established in NSW. The showground has been used continuously for 140 years for the annual Glen Innes Show. For many years in the late 19th and early 20th century, the Glen Innes Show and Showground was widely regarded as one of the leading shows in NSW due to both attendance, the quality and number of exhibits and also the quality of exhibition, stock handling and spectator facilities provided.

Its state heritage significance is enhanced through its association with the Dumaresq family, noted colonial politicians and pastoral holders. It is also associated with W. T. Cadell, a noted pastoralist who further developed the early pastoral station, Deepwater Station which was important to the fine wool export industry in the colony of NSW.

It is of aesthetic heritage significance at a state level as an outstanding picturesque and stylistically cohesive and complementary suite of Federation style buildings sited in a park-like setting. The group of buildings is one of NSW's most comprehensive array of show buildings sited on a single showground and arranged in an aesthetically pleasing and distinctive way around the central arena making it a landmark in the town.

The Glen Innes Showground is likely to have research values at a state level for its potential to demonstrate the full variety of exhibit, spectator and stock handling facilities required by a successful agricultural show

It is rare in NSW as one of the few remaining showgrounds in the state retaining a full suite of architect-designed, Federation style show buildings clustered around its central arena and demonstrating the breadth of activities undertaken by the Show and the development of the show over 140 years.

The Glen Innes Showgrounds is of state heritage significance as a fine example of a regional showground retaining its full suite of buildings. Its intactness and aesthetic qualities make this showground illustrative of an "ideal" regional showground.

Glen Innes Showground was listed on the New South Wales State Heritage Register on 4 September 2015 having satisfied the following criteria.

The place is important in demonstrating the course, or pattern, of cultural or natural history in New South Wales.

Glen Innes Showground is of state heritage significance as one of the earliest regional shows and showgrounds to be established in NSW. The first Glen Innes Show was held in 1869 and the first show held at the current showground was in 1874. The showground has been in continual use for the annual show since that time. The first agricultural shows were established in metropolitan Sydney. The first regional show held was at Maitland in 1844 with its current showground being opened in the early 1880s. Singleton Showground was first held in 1865 and the first show at its current site was held in 1868. Bathurst show began in 1863, moving to its permanent site in 1878 and Armidale show commenced on its current site in 1877.

The showground is also historically significant as one of the most successful in NSW late nineteenth and early twentieth century both in terms of attendance and entry takings and also the number and quality of exhibits.

Its historical significance also lies in the ability of its intact collection of buildings to demonstrate th evolution of agricultural and industrial activities in rural NSW and also by the fact that it has retained its original use as a showground since its establishment over 140 year ago.

The place has a strong or special association with a person, or group of persons, of importance of cultural or natural history of New South Wales's history.

The state heritage significance of the Glen Innes Show and Showground may be enhanced through its association with the Dumaresq family. The first president of the show was William Alexander Dumaresq, son of the well-known and at times notorious colonial figure William John Dumaresq who along with this brother amassed large and profitable landholdings in NSW including Saumarez and Tilbuster in the New England region. William John was a wealthy property owner in the area and married the sister in law of NSW Governor Belmore.

The Show and Showground also have a close and significant association with Deepwater Station and its owner WT Cadell who developed the station and its flock of merinos to the extent that it became one of the leading sheep station in NSW. Deepwater Station make an enormous contribution to the fine wool export industry in NSW. W. T. Cadell was financial and social patron of the Glen Innes Show from 1903 until his death in 1922. His work with the show led to it being recognised as one of the most successful shows in NSW in both levels of attendance and entry takings and also in the number and quality of exhibits at the annual show.

The place is important in demonstrating aesthetic characteristics and/or a high degree of creative or technical achievement in New South Wales.

Glen Innes Showground is of state heritage significance as an outstanding, picturesque and stylistically cohesive and complementary suite of showground buildings sited in a park like landscape setting. Most of the buildings date from the 1890s and 1920s and are all architect-designed by Sydney-based or local and regional architects.

The group of Federation style timber buildings display classical decorative elements. The collection also includes vernacular elements such as post and beam shed, post and rail gates and fences, stables and yards.

The group of buildings at Glen Innes showground are one of the most comprehensive array of show buildings gathered at one showground in NSW and are arranged in an aesthetically pleasing and distinctive way around the central arena. The iconic aesthetic qualities of the built and landscape elements of the showground make it a landmark feature of the town, more so than many other showgrounds in NSW. Its distinctive landmark aesthetic qualities have been recognised and used in promotional material produced by the Department of Lands which highlight the values of Crown Reserves across the state.

The place has potential to yield information that will contribute to an understanding of the cultural or natural history of New South Wales.

The Glen Innes Showground with its comprehensive collection of pavilions, grandstand, sheep and cattle pavilions and stock holding yards, stables and other ancillary structures holds research potential as one of the most intact and diverse group of showground buildings in the state. The buildings have important technical and research potential because of their age, architectural and construction merit.

The place possesses uncommon, rare or endangered aspects of the cultural or natural history of New South Wales.

The Glen Innes Showground is likely to be of state heritage significance as a rare example of a showground with a full complement of showground buildings demonstrating the breadth of activities associated with a regional show and the development of the show as the agricultural economy of the region developed.

The collection of buildings in their landscape setting is also rare as they are still intact and unaltered. Many other NSW showgrounds have retained their grandstands and in some cases, other pavilions but many of the historic pavilions are either demolished or in a state of dilapidation. Along with Singleton, Maitland, and Bathurst, Glen Innes retains a diverse collection of buildings and has strived to ensure new buildings are largely sympathetic with the historic buildings. Glen Innes is a rare example of an aesthetically cohesive group of showground buildings in a carefully planned and maintained landscape setting.

The place is important in demonstrating the principal characteristics of a class of cultural or natural places/environments in New South Wales.

Glen Innes Showgrounds is likely to be of state heritage significance as fine representative example of a regional showground retaining the diversity of its exhibition, hospitality and spectator facilities in its landscaped setting. Its intactness and aesthetic qualities including the stylistic cohesion of the buildings and its layout clustered around the central arena make this showground illustrative of an "ideal" regional showground in NSW.
