= East Queensland Border languages =

Proposed group of Australian Aboriginal languages

East Queensland Border
- (proposed)
- Geographic distribution: Queensland, Australia
- Linguistic classification: Pama-Nyumgan: East Queensland Border

Language codes
- Glottolog: east2770

The East Queensland Border languages are a proposed group of Australian Aboriginal languages which are mostly extinct. The family is accepted by Glottolog.

== Classification ==
- East Queensland Border
  - Yagara-Jandai
  - Yugambalic †
    - Guyambal †
    - Yugambal-Bigambal †
      - Yugambal †
      - Bigambul †
