= Kwiambal =

The Kwiambal are an Aboriginal Australian people of New South Wales.

== Name ==
The ethnonym is formed from their word for "no", transcribed by early ethnographers as quie/koi, and the suffix bal, which denotes a tribal grouping.

== Country ==
Norman Tindale assigned to the Kwiambal a territorial domain of roughly 800 square miles (2,100 km^{2}) around the lower Severn River and in the area of Ashford and Fraser's Creek. To their south were the Jukambal. However, Tindale's boundary could be disputed.

On 27 October 1848, Commissioner Bligh from the Gwydir Crown Lands Department wrote a letter to the NSW Colonial Secretary. The letter proposed relocating the Ulleroy (Kamilaroi), Quinnenbul (Kwiambal), and Ginnenbal people from their original areas to Mr. Jones' station at Cranky Rock, near Warialda. The letter strongly recommended that "native" reserves be established to protect the tribes from the settlers, and to provide them with employment opportunities as laborers on the stations.

In 1854, William Gardner suggested that the Kwiambal language group inhabited the districts of Myall Creek and Gwydir River.

In his account of a journey south of Brisbane in 1855, the Presbyterian missionary William Ridley wrote

I came down the Gwydir to the Bundarra, and over that river to Warialda. The aborigines I found at Warialda, twelve in number, speak Kamilaroi as well as Uolaroi; but they were the last I met who spoke to me in the former language. A day's journey northward from Warialda, I found blacks speaking Yukumba; and on the Macintyre, 70 miles from Warialda, Pikumbul is the prevailing language.

During the 1856 delivery of blanket rations, the Kwiambal and Ginnenbal tribes were located at Myall Creek and Gwydir River. There were 25 members in each tribe.

== Tribal status ==
In his 1930 publication "The Social Organization of Australian Tribes. Part II", Radcliffe-Brown mentioned that the Anewan tribal social structure includes the Kwiambal, Ngarabal, and Juckenbal. Additionally, one of the Kwiambal informants was a survivor of the Slaughterhouse Creek massacre near Warialda.

Tindale intuited that the geographic context a day's riding from Warialda would imply that these people, whom Ridley called Yukumba, must have been Kwiambal. At the same time he did not exclude the possibility that they may have been a horde of the Jukambal. The objections to merging the Kwiambal with Jukambal, or vice versa, were twofold: the size of their estimated territory was too large to refer to a clan or band society, and, secondly, the ethnonym Kwiambal has a -bal tribal suffix.

== Alternative names ==
- Koi
- Kweembul
- Queenbulla
- Quieumble

Source: Tindale 1974, p. 194

== Some words ==
- goone (white man)
- kuppenea (mother)
- maroni (kangaroo)
- menni (tame dog)
- parpinga (father)

Source: Magistrates 1887, p. 298

== Sources ==
- Kite, Suzanne; Wurm, Stephen Adolphe (2004). The Duunidjawu Language of the Southeast Queensland: Grammar, Texts and Vocabulary. Research School of Pacific and Asian Studies, Australian National University. ISBN 978-0-858-83550-4.
- Lauterer, J. (1897). "The Aboriginal languages of eastern Australia compared". Proceedings of the Royal Society of Queensland. 12: 11–16. doi:10.5962/p.351257.
- MacPherson, J. (1904). "Ngarrabul and other aboriginal tribes: distribution of tribes". Proceedings of the Linnean Society of New South Wales. 29: 677–684. doi:10.5962/bhl.part.20175.
- Magistrates (1887). "Queenbulla, Ashford and Quiningguillan" (PDF). In Curr, Edward Micklethwaite (ed.). The Australian race: its origin, languages, customs, place of landing in Australia and the routes by which it spread itself over the continent. Vol. 3. Melbourne: J. Ferres. pp. 298–299.
- Ridley, William (1861). "Journal of a Missionary Tour Among the Aborigines of the Western Interior of Queensland in the Year 1855" (PDF). In Lang, Gideon S. (ed.). The Aborigines of Australia. London: Edward Stanford. pp. 435–445.
- Tindale, Norman Barnett (1974). "Kwiambal (NSW)". Aboriginal Tribes of Australia: Their Terrain, Environmental Controls, Distribution, Limits, and Proper Names. Australian National University.
- Wafer, James William; Lissarrague, Amanda; Harkins, Jean (2008). A Handbook of Aboriginal Languages of New South Wales and the Australian Capital Territory. Muurrbay Aboriginal Language and Culture Co-operative. ISBN 978-0-977-53518-7.
- Wyndham, W. T. (1889). "Aborigines of Australia". Proceedings of the Royal Society of New South Wales. 23: 36–42. doi:10.5962/p.359061.
