= Ngarabal language =

Ngarabal language may refer to:

- the Copmanhurst dialect of the Bandjalang language, sometimes called Ngarabal
- Ngarrbal or Ngarrabul, a dialect of the Yugambal language spoken by the Ngarabal people
