= Stephen Evans (journalist) =

BBC correspondent

Stephen Evans (born c. 1955, Cardiff, Wales) is a journalist who previously worked for the BBC as their correspondent in Berlin, Germany and Seoul, South Korea. As of 2018 he works at The Canberra Times. He came to particular prominence in 2001 when he was inside the Twin Towers during the September 11 attacks.

== Background ==
Evans was born in Cardiff and lived in Bridgend, South Wales. He studied Economics at Cambridge University and, in 1983, joined the BBC at BBC Radio Wales. He became Welsh TV reporter of the Year in 1988 whilst working for HTV. He subsequently became the BBC's industry correspondent.

== BBC correspondent ==
In 2001 Evans became the BBC's North America business correspondent. On the morning of September 11, 2001 he was sitting in the ground floor foyer of the South Tower of the World Trade Center in New York, waiting to report on a meeting, when the North Tower was hit by a passenger airliner in the 9/11 terrorist attack. He described hearing a "huge bang" like "like somebody dropped a skip full of rubbish" followed by "two or three similar huge explosions". The South Tower shook and Evans left to find a telephone to contact the BBC newsroom. Evans became the main BBC reporter covering the unfolding events in New York.

Evans became the BBC's Berlin correspondent in 2010 and subsequently their Seoul correspondent in 2014.

In 2017 he moved to New South Wales, Australia after marrying an Australian woman. He worked as Senior Journalist, reporting on local community news at the Glen Innes Examiner. In 2018, Evans joined the staff of The Canberra Times.

Later, he reported the impeachment of President Park in Seoul
