= Nancy Allen =

Nancy Allen may refer to:

- Nancy Allen (actress) (born 1950), American actress and cancer activist
- Nancy Allen (architect) (1908–1993), Australian architect
- Nancy Allen (harpist) (born 1954), American harpist

== See also ==
- Nancy Allan (born 1952), Manitoban politician
- Allen (surname)
