= Yugambal language =

Extinct Australian Aboriginal language

Yugambal
- Jukambal
- Region: New South Wales, Australia
- Ethnicity: Jukambal, Ngarabal
- Extinct: after 1855
- Language family: Pama–Nyungan: Yuin–Kuric? East Queensland Border?; Kuri?; Yugambal
- Dialects: Yugambal; Ngarbal; Marbal

Language codes
- ISO 639-3: yub
- Glottolog: yuga1244
- AIATSIS: E11 Yugambal, E68 Ngarbal, E91 Marbal
- ELP: Yugambal

Yugambal (Yugumbal, Jukambal), or Yugumbil (Jukambil), is an Australian Aboriginal language of northern New South Wales. The name is derived from the word juka, meaning 'no'.

== Classification ==
Yugambal may have been a Kuric language. However, it has been confused with the Bundjalung dialect of Yugambeh in the literature, muddling accounts of its classification. Yugumbil is, however, considered a dialect of Bandjalang. It has also been grouped with Yagara, Janday, Guyambal and Bigambal.

== History ==
As late as 1855, people speaking the Jukambal language were encountered living on the Macintyre River.

== Geographical distribution ==
Macpherson (1905) describes the Yugambal language as prevailing from Boggy Camp and Inverell, almost to Bingara on the west, Bundarra on the south, and Tingha on the south-east. He further notes that the Ngarrabul, Marbul, and Yugambal people understood each other, as did Ngarrabul, Kwiambal and Yugambal, so they are assumed to have spoken dialects of a single language. Dixon also gives Ngarrabul or Ngarrbal as a dialect of the Yugambal language.

== Status ==
The status of the language is uncertain. Some known language speakers, including Sira Draper, Hughie Green and Archie Green, were alive in the mid-to-late 20th century. However, it is unknown whether there are any other speakers.

== Documentation ==
There is little description of the language. RH Matthews published a basic grammar of the Yugambal language in 1902, while word lists for Tenterfield, Glen Innes and Ashford provide limited data of the Ngarrabul, Kwiambal and Marbul dialects. John Macpherson (1904) and Thomas Wyndham lived amongst Yugambal and Ngarrabul people for some time, and published records of Yugambal and Ngarrabul vocabulary, as well as cultural and religious practices and traditions. There are also many unpublished notebooks of John Macpherson and other researchers of the late 19th and early 20th centuries that contain records of the Yugambal language.
