= Stonehenge, New South Wales =

Town in New South Wales, Australia

Coordinates: 29.797376°S 151.733541°E

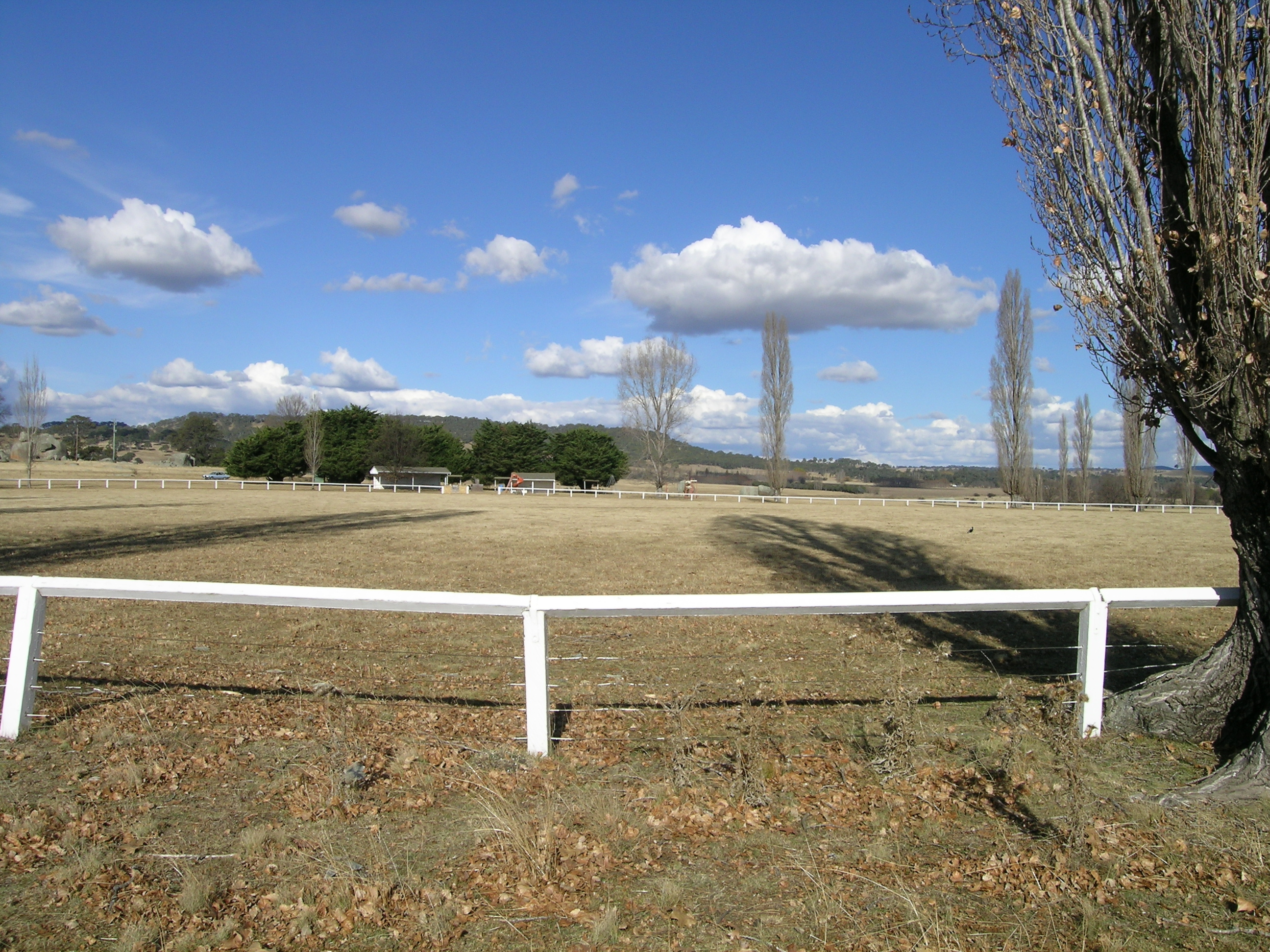
Recreation Reserve, Stonehenge, NSW

Stonehenge is a rural locality on the Northern Tablelands of New England in New South Wales, Australia.

The settlement is located about 8 kilometres (5 mi) south of Glen Innes, on the New England Highway and just north of Beardy Waters. It is about 1,067 metres (3,500 ft) above sea level and exists mainly as a flat plateau strewn with granite boulders, some over 5 metres high. One of note is a roughly spherical monolith about 2.5 metres in diameter known as the Balancing Rock. The locality was named because of the local granite outcrops that were reminiscent of Stonehenge, England.

== History ==
The land where Stonehenge Station was established is the territory of the Ngarabal people, who knew the area as "Hol'pin", meaning many casuarinas near a large plain. The area contains sacred sites and remains of great significance to Ngarabal people today.

Stonehenge station was occupied by Thomas Hewitt in 1838 on behalf of Archibald Boyd making him the first settler in the Glen Innes district. In 1848, Stonehenge, also known as Boyd’s Plains covered an area of 320 square kilometres (80,000 acres). In 1886 the station was purchased by a Queensland grazier, George Morris Simpson, who built the Stonehenge homestead the following year.

The Main North railway line (now closed) crosses the New England Highway at Stonehenge, which also had a railway station which opened in 1884 and was closed about 1974.

Stonehenge has a recreation reserve of about 32 hectares (80 acres) which includes a sports ground, shelter shed and toilets.

== Media ==
Local news coverage is provided by Glen Innes News which publishes in print as well as online

Preceding station	Former services	Following station
Glen Innes towards Wallangarra	Main Northern Line	Glencoe towards Sydney
