= Guyambal language =

Australian Aboriginal language

Gujambal
- Kwiambal
- Native to: Australia
- Ethnicity: Kwiambal, ?Bigambul, ?Kambuwal
- Era: attested 1887
- Language family: Pama–Nyungan: (unclassified) Durubalic?; Gujambal
- Dialects: Gambuwal?

Language codes
- ISO 639-3: None (mis)
- Glottolog: guya1250
- AIATSIS: D35 Guyambal, D29 Gambuwal

Gujambal (Guyambal, Kwiambal) is a possible extinct Australian Aboriginal language. It is documented only in a wordlist published 1887. 'Gambuwal' may have been the same language, and may have been a dialect of Bigambul.
