= Marbal dialect =

Yugambal dialect of NSW, Australia

Marbal
- Marbul
- Region: New South Wales, Australia
- Era: attested 1887?
- Language family: Pama–Nyungan: Yuin–Kuric?; Kuri?; Yugambal; Marbal

Language codes
- ISO 639-3: –
- Glottolog: None
- AIATSIS: E91

Marbal (Marbul) is an extinct dialect of the Yugambal language that was spoken around Tenterfield in northern New England, Australia.

Macpherson (1905) describes the Marbal language as being spoken around Tenterfield, and notes that it is closely related to Ngarrabul and Yugambal. Tindale (1974) speculates that Marbal or Marbul is in fact a mishearing of Ngarabal and not a separate language dialect.

There is very little surviving information about Marbal, although Curr (1886–1887) does provide an anonymous word list for the Tenterfield region, that is presumed by Dixon (1976) among others to be a basic Marbal vocabulary.
