= Boobera Lagoon =

Lake in Australia

- Location within New South Wales
- Coordinates: 28.63°S 150.15°E
- Basin countries: Australia
- Max. length: 7 km (4.3 mi)

Boobera Lagoon is a permanent water hole in Moree Plains Shire, New South Wales, Australia, approximately 20 kilometres west of Goondiwindi in Queensland. It is located at 28.63°S 150.15°E. It lies several kilometres south of the Macintyre River, which forms the border between Queensland (to the north) and New South Wales, and is just north of the Mungindi - Goondiwindi road. Its outflow, which connects to the river, is named Boobera Watercourse.

The lagoon is 7 kilometres in length and supports a wide variety of aquatic and bird life.

The Indigenous people of the area believe the lagoon is the resting place of Garriya, the Rainbow Serpent, an important figure in dreamtime legend. The lagoon was particularly significant to the Bigambul and Kamilaroi people, who held the third stage of their joint male initiation ceremonies at this site.

Today Boobera Lagoon is recognised as a culturally significant site and motorised water sport is prohibited on the Lagoon.
