= Wellingrove, New South Wales =

Wellingrove
- Town
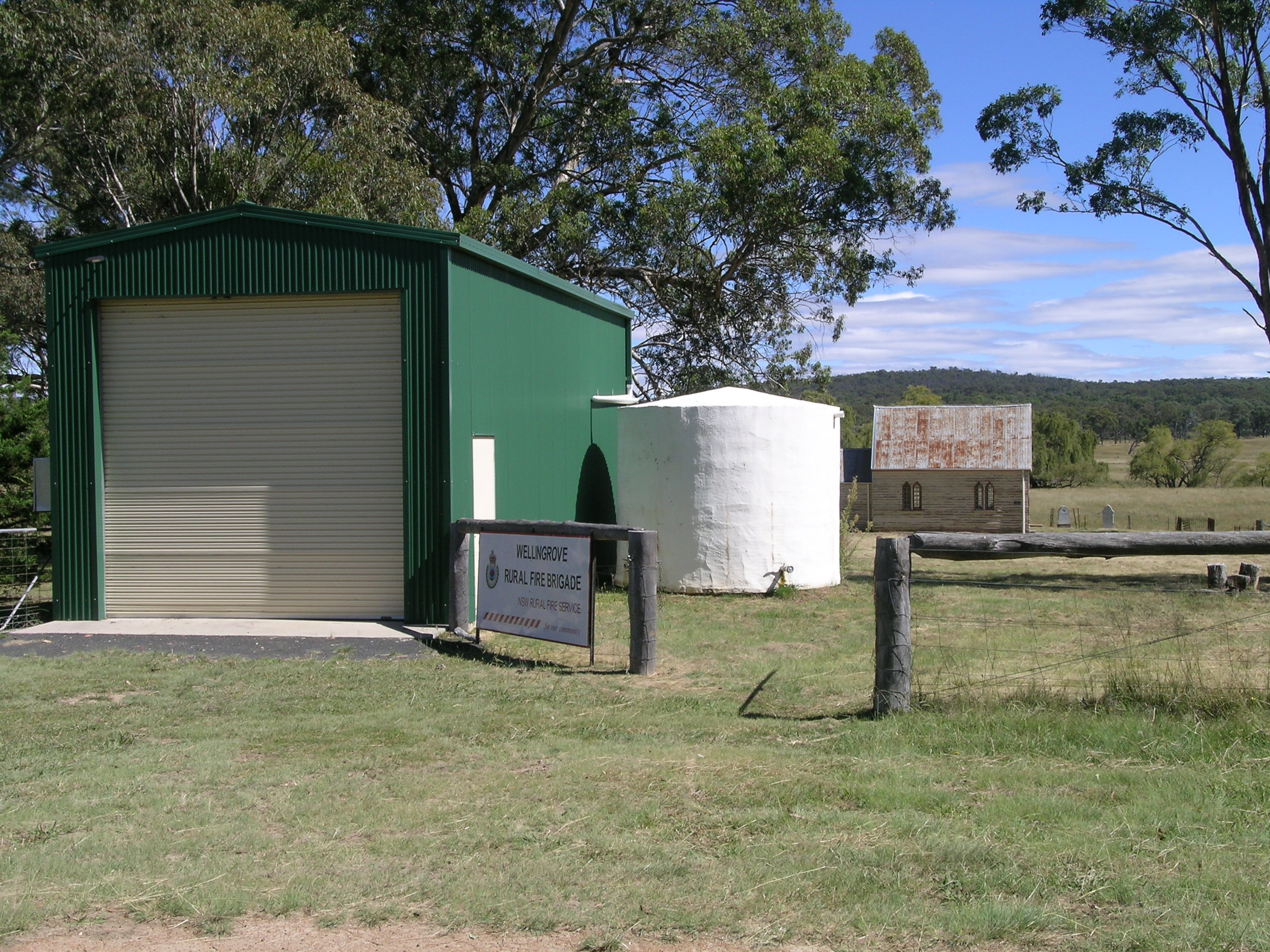
- The RFS, church and cemetery at Wellingrove

- Coordinates: 29°38′S 151°35′E
- Country: Australia
- State: New South Wales
- LGA: Glen Innes Severn Council
- Established: 1852

Government
  - State electorate: Northern Tablelands
  - Federal division: New England
- Elevation: 903 m (2,963 ft)

Population
  - Total: 113 (2006 census)
- Postcode: 2370
- County: Gough

Wellingrove is a village located on the Wellingrove Road about 20 kilometres (12 mi) north west of Glen Innes, New South Wales on the Northern Tablelands, New South Wales, Australia. At the 2006 census, Wellingrove had a population of 113.

Wellingrove was established in the 1840s when the run of 50,000 acres (200 km^{2}) was taken up by George Polhill. This run became a site for Polhill, who was a resident magistrate, to conduct a court of petty sessions for the area between Ben Lomond to Bolivia. In 1849 the Woolpack Inn was built and in 1849 Galloway, the surveyor, was instructed to survey townships at Wellingrove and Glen Innes. Despite objections from Galloway that the area was too far from main roads the town was gazetted in 1852. Thus for several decades Wellingrove was one of the principal settlements of the northern New England district.

The closure and movement of the court of petty sessions to Glen Innes in 1858 led to the decline of Wellingrove. The last business to close was the Wellingrove Hotel, which shut down in 1917. However, with the continued growth of the nearby towns of Glen Innes and Inverell, the village of Wellingrove declined and is now a place of minimal significance.

Today Wellingrove has a church, Rural Fire Service (RFS) and a community hall in a Crown Land fossicking area where sapphires and zircons may be found. The main industry is agriculture, principally sheep and beef cattle breeding.

Kings Plains National Park is located about 20 kilometres north west of Wellingrove.

== Media ==
Local news coverage is provided by Glen Innes News which publishes in print as well as online
