= Kings Plains National Park =

National park in Australia

- IUCN category II (national park)
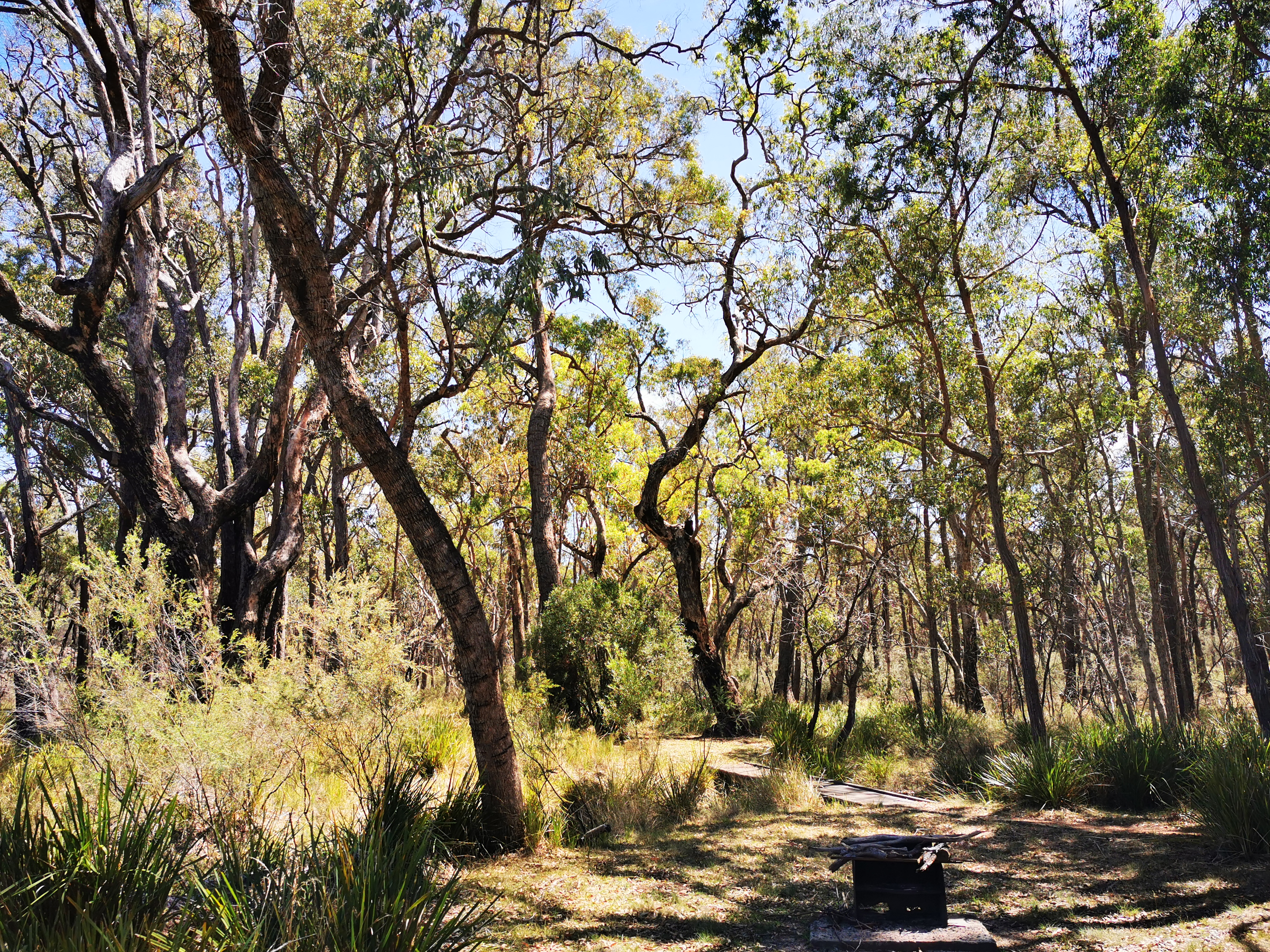

- Location within New South Wales
- Location: New South Wales
- Nearest city: Glen Innes
- Coordinates: 29°34′48″S 151°21′56″E
- Area: 57 km^{2} (22 sq mi)
- Established: 1988
- Governing body: NSW National Parks & Wildlife Service
- Website: Official website

Kings Plains is a national park in New South Wales, Australia, 48 km from Inverell, 50 km from Glen Innes and 478 km north of Sydney.

== History ==
Kings Plains was founded in January 1988 and was made a national park to preserve and protect the array of wild animals, plants and the Kings Plains creek with its many water features and found in 1988.

== Land features ==
Kings Plains National Park is not widely known to people for the land, people mostly enjoy the array of water features joining the Kings Plains creek from non-drying pools to rapids to waterfalls, which leads to a gorge. The land itself is mostly made up of sandy soils with shrub. The soil is more fertile around the creek.

== Vegetation ==
Some vegetation in the Kings Plains woodland includes iron-barks, cypress pine, yellow box, stringy-barks, eucalyptus trees, and apple box. Among the shrubs are rare species such as the grey guinea flower, folded leaf waxflower and Rodd's star-hair. During spring the park's wildflowers are at their most colourful.

== Wildlife ==
Amongst the large variety of wildlife are eastern grey kangaroos, wallaroos, wallabies and koalas which live in the park near water and fertile soils. Also the rare brush-tail wallaby has been in the park. Platypus can be seen along the creek, but some of their habitat above the falls is considered fragile. In the area, 82 bird species have been recorded, including eastern and crimson rosellas, king parrots, yellow-tailed black cockatoos, currawongs, wattle birds and many species of honeyeaters. There are also the endangered glossy black cockatoos, turquoise parrots and regent honeyeaters. In and around Kings Plains Creek the straw-necked ibis can be found and high above "birds of prey" such as the wedge-tailed eagle and the peregrine falcon are seen.

== Activities ==
The main attraction of Kings Plains National Park is bushwalking along the creek to Kings Plains Falls is seen as an enjoyable trip of about 2.5 hours. The creek banks also make a good attraction. Kings Plains is not well known but I see this is a getaway from the insanity of being crowded in a boring trailer park. The park offers walks, camping, picnic areas and the old style non-flush toilets.

== See also ==
- Protected areas of New South Wales
