= Nancy Allen (architect) =

Australian architect (1908–1993)

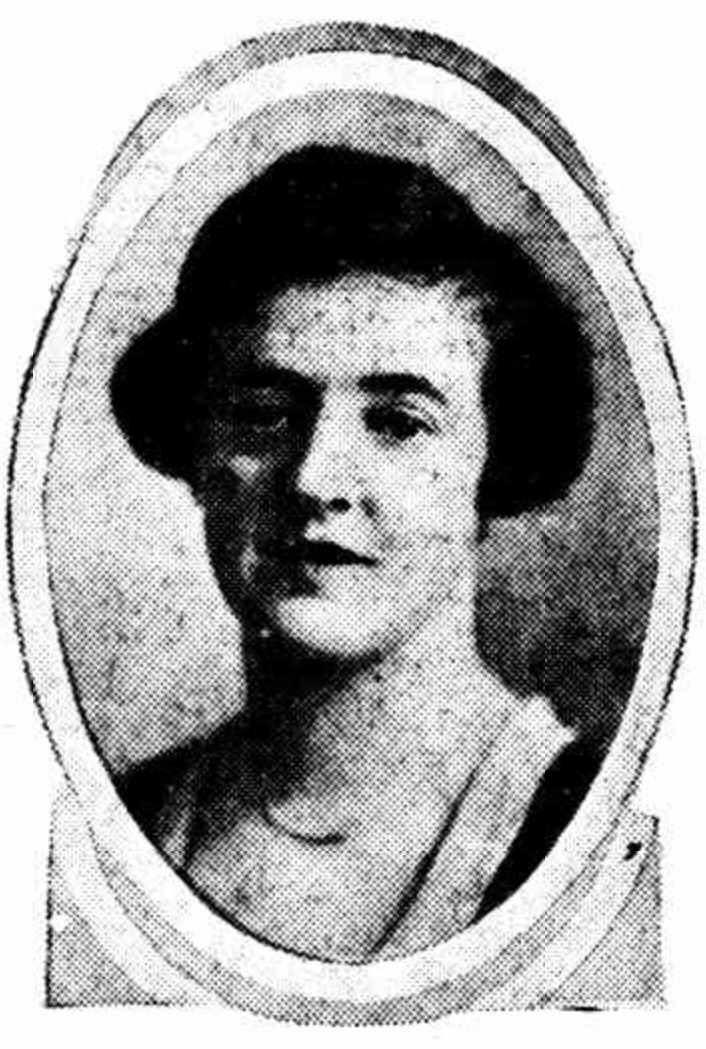
- Allen in 1932
- Born: Nancy Lorne Allen; 5 December 1908; Glen Innes, New South Wales, Australia
- Died: 18 October 1993 (aged 84); Nedlands, Western Australia
- Occupation: Architect
- Years active: 1927–1981

Nancy Lorne Allen (5 December 1908 – 18 October 1993) was an Australian architect and only the second woman registered to practise in Western Australia.

== Early life and education ==
Allen was born in Glen Innes, New South Wales on 5 December 1908. She was the second child and only daughter of Ethel Maud (née Young) and George Norman Allen, a grazier. The family moved to Perth in 1917, where Allen was educated at Nedlands Primary School and then Perth Modern School.

== Career ==
Allen began her articles with Eales and Cohen in 1927, the same partnership where Margaret Pitt Morison had earlier been articled. In October 1932 she was successful in the Architects' Board Examination and qualified as a registered architect. The firm had become Eales, Cohen and Bennett and she worked for them designing homes, saying that she "doesn't want to build skyscrapers". In May 1933 she gave a detailed description of her principles for all aspects of home design. Following the dissolution of the partnership in July 1935, she joined William G. Bennett in his business the following year, where she headed the "domestic architecture and interior decoration".

During World War II, following Bennett's enlistment, Allen worked from 1942 to 1945 for the Western Australian Works and Services Branch. There she worked with Pitt Morrison and Zoie Bennett-Fryer.

In September 1944 she represented the Modern Architectural Research Society and gave a talk at the Labour Women's Conference. She believed that every home should have "constant hot water, refrigeration, fly proofing, insulation against head, [and] electric or gas cooking" and gave details of an ideal neighbourhood of 6,000 people which should include a kindergarten and other infant services, library, shops and parks as a minimum.

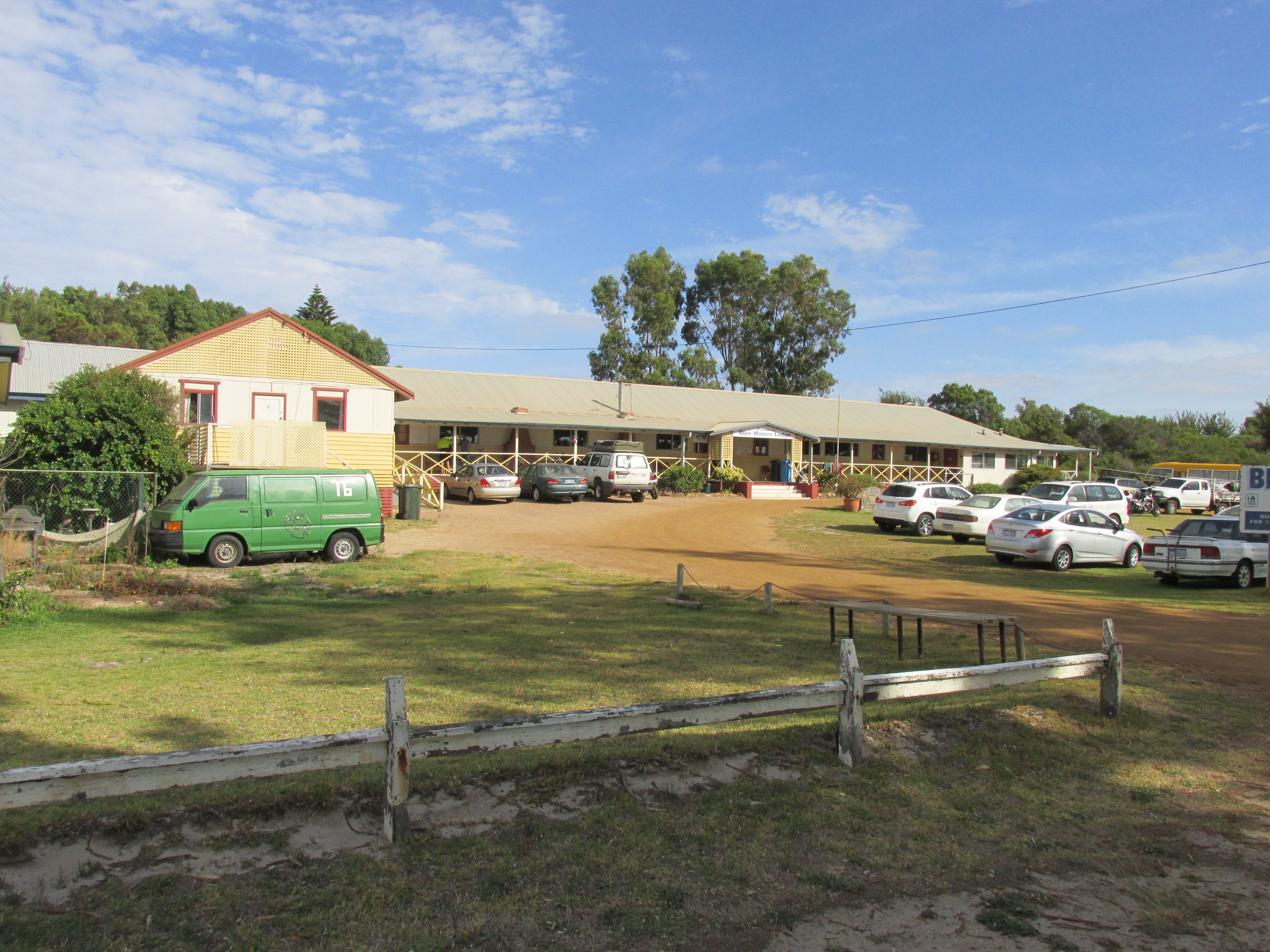
Blue Waters YHA in 2015 (formerly Fresh Air League Children's Home, Esperance)

In January 1946 she re-joined Bennett's architecture practice. Later that year she served in an honorary capacity, advising the Fresh Air League of Kalgoorlie on the design for a children's holiday home at Esperance. It was noted that she had "wide experience in designing infant health clinics and children's homes".

1949 saw Bennett's practice merge and become Bennett, Blatchford, Allen and Johnson, with Allen and her younger brother Douglas becoming partners alongside Bennett, Robert V. Blatchford and James W. Johnson.

Allen attended the Australian Architectural Convention in Melbourne in 1951. Meanwhile, she continued to design homes and oversee their building.

In 1970 Allen was elected a Fellow of the Royal Australian Institute of Architects. At the time of her retirement in 1981, she was considered "one of Perth's most prominent and successful female architects".

Allen died on 18 October 1993 in a nursing home in Nedlands.

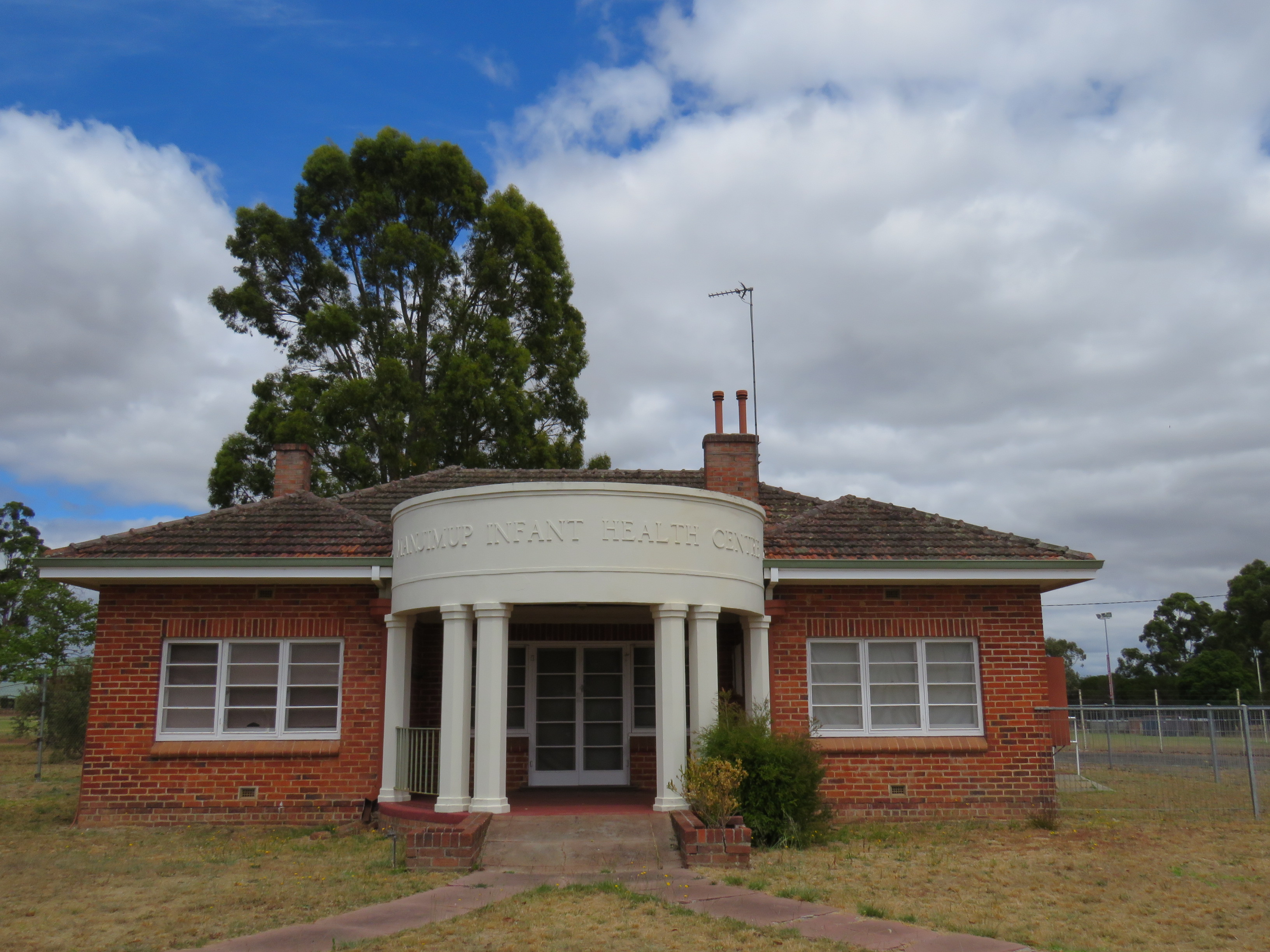
Manjimup Infant Health Centre, January 2022

== Notable works ==
Allen designed two buildings that are now heritage listed:

- Manjimup Infant Health Centre, opened 1946
- Paxwold House, Lesmurdie, opened 1957
