= Glen Innes Examiner =

The Glen Innes Examiner, previously published as the Glen Innes Examiner and General Advertiser, was an English language online newspaper in Glen Innes, New South Wales, Australia. It was owned by Australian Community Media.

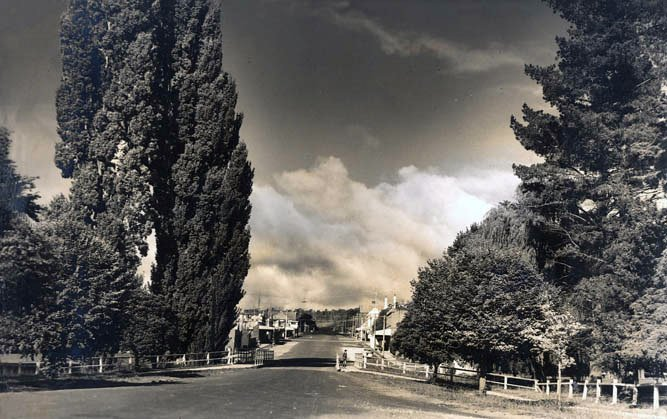
Glen Innes

== History ==
Glen Innes is a rural town in the heart of the Northern Tablelands of NSW with a district population of approximately 9,600.

The Glen Innes Examiner and General Advertiser was launched by Henry Cleave Vincent for the Vincent family on 5 October 1874. It reported on issues affecting the town and district from 1874 to present. On 21 July 1908 the title was shortened to Glen Innes Examiner.

Front page of Glen Innes Examiner, 21 July 1908

In September 2024, Australian Community Media announced it will shutter the paper.

== Digitisation ==
The Glen Innes Examiner and General Advertiser, and the Glen Innes Examiner (issues from 1908 to 1954) have been digitised as part of the Australian Newspapers Digitisation Program of the National Library of Australia.

== See also ==
- List of newspapers in Australia
- List of newspapers in New South Wales
