= Middle Creek (New South Wales) =

Location
- Country: Australia

Physical characteristics
- Source
  - location: New South Wales

Middle Creek (New South Wales) is a river of the state of New South Wales in Australia.

== See also ==
- List of rivers of Australia
