= Kambuwal =

Indigenous Australian people

The Kambuwal were an indigenous Australian people of the state of Queensland.

== Country ==
Norman Tindale estimated that the Kambuwal's territory stretched over some 3,700 square miles (9,600 km^{2}). They straddled the border between Queensland and New South Wales, from south of Millmerran, and Inglewood to Bonshaw. Their eastern flank ended around Stanthorpe, Wallangarra and the western scarp of the Great Dividing Range.

== Alternative names ==
- Gambuwal
- Gambabal
- Gambubal
- Kaoambul
- Cambooble

== Sources ==
- Barlow, Harriott (1873). "Vocabulary of aboriginal dialects of Queensland". The Journal of the Anthropological Institute of Great Britain and Ireland. 2 (2): 165–175. doi:10.2307/2841159. JSTOR 2841159.
- MacPherson, J. (1904). "Ngarrabul and other aboriginal tribes: distribution of tribes". Proceedings of the Linnean Society of New South Wales. 29: 677–684. doi:10.5962/bhl.part.20175.
- Tindale, Norman Barnett (1974). "Kambuwal (QLD)". Aboriginal Tribes of Australia: Their Terrain, Environmental Controls, Distribution, Limits, and Proper Names. Australian National University Press.
