= Jukambal =

Ethnic group in Australia

The Jukambal were an indigenous Australian people located in northern New South Wales, Australia.

== Name ==
The ethnonym Jukambal is form from the word juka, meaning 'no'.

== Country ==
The traditional lands of the Jukambal stretched over an estimated 1,300 square miles (3,400 km^{2}), running from around Glen Innes in a northern and easterly direction, through New England, up to Drake, Tenterfield and Wallangarra. They dwelt east of the line connecting Tenterfield and Glen Innes.

== People ==
The Jukambal were often thought of as part of another tribal group, the Ngarabal, but are now considered to have been a distinct society. In 1931, Alfred R. Radcliffe-Brown published a study on the social organization of Australian tribes. He suggested that the Jukambal people were a part of the Anewan group, which also includes the Kwiambal, Ngarabal, and Bigumbal. The informants for this study were Billy Munro and Towney, who provided information on the Jukambal people.

== Medicine ==
It was the general opinion of aborigines in this area that disease and sickness was rare before the coming of the whites, with tumors rare or unknown. The Jukambal even claimed rheumatism never struck until the colonials' advent. Knowledge about medicinal plants, often thought to have potent effects, was introduced to young men undergoing initiation at a Bora ceremonial. Some would become fully-fledged medicine men (Noonwaebah) thought to be invested with powers that could endanger others. The Jukambal though anyone who fell sick was exposed in his weak state to the secret enmity of enemies, and as a safeguard often the patient (dthikkae) (Note: MacPherson in a footnote glosses the word, stating that doubts existed over its authenticity (MacPherson 1902, p. 638).) would summon in several medicine men to examine his physical plight.

Corkwood, in which hyoscyamine is present, was as generally in eastern Australia exploited for its toxic properties. When stricken by drought, the Jukambal would draw water from the Angophora apple trees, rather than risk drinking water from impure sources. Fractures were set by binding the affected limb with two pieces of bark stripped from a Bugaibil tree, whose sap was believed to have curative properties. Snake bites even from the most venomous species rarely proved fatal, the poison being promptly sucked out, with the Jukambal also binding over the wound a ligature made from possum (koobi) skin.

== Alternative names ==
- Jukambil
- Ukumbil, Ucumble
- Yacambal
- Yookumbul, Yookumbil, Yookumbill, Yoocumbill, Yookumble, Yoocomble
- Yukambal, Yukumbul, Yukumbil
- Yukumba

Source: Tindale 1974

== Sources ==
- MacPherson, John (1902). "Ngarrabul and other aboriginal tribes. Part 1". Proceedings of the Linnean Society of New South Wales. 27: 637–647 – via BHL.
- Tindale, Norman Barnett (1974). "Jukambal (NSW)". Aboriginal Tribes of Australia: Their Terrain, Environmental Controls, Distribution, Limits, and Proper Names. Australian National University Press. ISBN 978-0-708-10741-6. Archived from the original on 22 February 2014.
