= Bigambul language =

Extinct Australian Aboriginal language

Bigambul
- Bigambal
- Native to: Australia
- Region: Goondiwindi Region, Queensland
- Ethnicity: Bigambul people
- Extinct: by 1996
- Language family: Pama–Nyungan: (unclassified); Bigambul

Language codes
- ISO 639-3: xbe
- Glottolog: biga1237
- AIATSIS: D34
- ELP: Bigambal

Bigambul (also Bigambal, Bigumbil, Pikambul, or Pikumbul) is an extinct and unclassified Australian Aboriginal language from the Pama–Nyungan language family. The Bigambul language region includes the landscape within the local government boundaries of the Goondiwindi Regional Council, including the towns of Goondiwindi, Yelarbon and Texas extending north towards Moonie and Millmerran. The AUSTLANG database maintained by the Australian Institute of Aboriginal and Torres Strait Islander Studies states that the Bigambul language was spoken by the Bigambul people, with Gambuwal and Kwiambal (or Gujambal) known dialects. However, it is likely that the Gamilaraay (or Yuwaaliyaay) language was used by those peoples living in southern Bigambul territory.

== Classification ==
Dixon (2002) groups Bigambul together with the Bundjalung languages while O'Grady, Voegelin and Voegelin classify it as a Wiradjuric language.

Glottolog states that Wafer and Lissarrague (2008) have classed Bigambul, Guyambal and Yugambal together.

== Vocabulary ==
Some words from the Bigambul language, as spelt and written by Bigambul authors, include:

- Bamburr: kangaroo
- Dhigaraa: bird
- Dhimba: snake
- Dhurrii: land
- Gayker: echidna
- Gillee: sun
- Gool: fish
- Gulli: rain/water
- Koobee: possum
- Noorah: home/camp
- Warril: river
- Weeimba gilee: hello
- Woodyun: grass
