= Joseph Lauterer =

German/Australian botanist (1848–1911)

Joseph Lauterer (18 November 1848 – 29 July 1911) was a German-Australian biologist, medical doctor, ethnographer and travel writer.

== Life ==
Lauterer was born in Freiburg im Breisgau and studied medicine at the Albert Ludwig University of Freiburg. On the outbreak of the Franco-Prussian War he enlisted and did service in a sanitary unit as a surgeon's mate, and then returned to his studies, graduating in 1872. He published an important study of the Freiburg area's botanical heritage in 1874.

== Australia ==
In 1885, Lauterer emigrated to Australia, and, after sojourning in the Blue Mountains, moved to Queensland where he set up a medical practice in Brisbane and worked as a physician for 25 years. In his leisure, he joined several learned societies. In 1896 he was elected president of the Royal Society of Queensland. He did considerable fieldwork on Australia's ethnobotany, concentrating on plants that had either a medicinal function or toxic effects. His papers on these topics are to this day cited by specialists as key works. He undertook experiments in a laboratory he rigged up at home, where he investigated the resins and exudates of Australian species such as eucalypts and angophora, which bore fruit in a scientific study in 1895. He identified the Charon annulipes an indigenous species of scorpion endemic to Queensland.

== Language Studies ==
Lauterer also wrote on Aboriginal languages, and published on English loan-words into a dialect of Jagera, which he called yerongpan.

Many words are taken from the English in a mutilated form, e.g.,buredn, bread; tseruse, trousers; whymerigan,(white Mary), an English lady; bullae, ox; goondool (gondola, a small boat; deamer,steamer. Somer words have only been invented when the white man came into contact with aboriginals, e-g., the horse yereman is named after the kangaroo,guruman; the sheep is called monkey. The names of native weapons, as adopted by the colonists, are mostly derived from the Sydney blacks. The boomerang, for instance, is called baragan, or bargan, in the Yerongpan language.'

== Personal details ==
Lauterer would often entertain those who came to listen to his lectures by singing Aboriginal songs, or preparing foods, like the bunya nuts, which formed part of the diet of Brisbane area tribes.
