= Ngarbal =

Aboriginal people in New South Wales, Australia

The Ngarabal are an Aboriginal people of the area from Ashford, Tenterfield and Glen Innes in northern New South Wales, Australia.

== Language ==
Ngarabal was still spoken in the area around Glen Innes, Stonehenge and Emmaville when John MacPherson practised as a doctor in northern New South Wales in the late 1890s. (Note: "From Stonehenge north to Bolivia including Beardy River and Beardy Plains, Matheson, Waterloo, Ilparran, Glenn Innes, Clairvaulx, Wellingrove, Wellingrove Creek, Glendon, Yarraford, Furrucabad, Beaufort, Dundee, Ranger's Valley, Emmaville (Vegetable Creek), Deepwater and Wellingtonn Vale." (MacPherson 1904, p. 679))

== Country ==
The Ngarabal's territory covers an estimated 1,000 square miles (2,600 km^{2}) of land, from Tenterfield to Glen Innes. It includes the Beardy River and the Severn River catchment.

== Society ==
The Ngarabal were closely related to the Jukambal, and it is possible that they may have constituted a western group of hordes of the latter, though authorities like Alfred Radcliffe-Brown have stated that they formed a distinct tribal unit.

Neither circumcision nor subincision were practised by the Ngarabal. Nose piercing was equally unknown, as was tooth evulsion. Scarification however was practised for ornamental ends, among both men and women, but was optional.

== Mythology ==
According to a Ngarabal, all indigenous people formed one unified group until the onset of a great flood which swept over the land, and the scant survivors were separated, each distinct remnant then developing into distinct tribes with different languages.

== Medicine ==
A species of angophora apple tree, tapped for its tannin-rich kino, formed part of the Ngarabul pharmacopoeia. The gum of Eucalyptus robusta was also used medicinally. The leaves of the manna gum were used to treat ophthalmic maladies such as "bad eye". In terms of internal medicine, their properties were used in cases of diarrhoea, something MacPherson observed as working when he applied the remedy to a pet opossum suffering from loose bowels. Two curative functions were thought to be derived from the fat of the carpet snakes, as an emollient for burns, and as an embrocation for rheumatism.

In the Ngarrabul tribe an eagle-hawk's feather was placed over the soft tissue of wounds, and this was in turn then covered with tea tree bark. Both were then bandaged up with a kangaroo skin to ensure a poultice-like warmth. Various species of Melaleuca, Callistemon and Leptospermum were stripped of bark to set bones: the bark was used inside-out, the bones were set or immobilized by the inner layers, the softer outside layers served as padding.

Snake-bites were treated by cutting the skin around the fanged flesh, and then several medicine men would suck the venom in turns. The "soldier bird" (noisy miner) was much prized for its habit of kicking up a din whenever snakes were nearby. (Note: This is identified as myzantha garrula, which 19th century sources often gloss as "noisy honey-eater" and MacPherson seems to be referring to some species of honeyeater. However, the "soldier" implies the highly aggressive noisy miner (Manorina melanocephala) which feeds on nectar and honeydew and is well-known in eastern Australia as a look-out bird whose mobbing attacks on snakes is prized. "Myzantha garrula" was a classification used by John Latham a century earlier, and it was C.M. Lyons who established the now preferred term, noisy miner, in 1901, a year before MacPherson's paper was published (Gray & Fraser 2013, p. 204; MacPherson 1902, p. 645).)

== Recent activities ==
In 1987, the Glen Innes Aboriginal Land Council purchased The Willows in 1987 with the assistance of New South Wales Aboriginal Land Council. Marlow Hill is situated on The Willows and was named after the "Marlow/Marno" family of Deepwater station. Subsequently, three adjacent properties- Rosemont, Canoon and Boorabee, were added to the site as part of an indigenous protected area.

Nine sites of Ngarabal cultural important have been identified in this area, now known as the Willows and Boorabee, which, since 2010, is classified under IUCN Category VI regulations and managed as a protected area where sustainable use of its natural resources is permitted. Ngarabal people may continue to harvest witchetty grubs, black orchids and mookrum berries.

== Media ==
In the 2022 video game Need for Speed Unbound the character Waru is a Ngarabal man.

== Alternative names ==
- Marbul (This name is believed to be either a result of mishearing the pronunciation, or a typographical mistake.)
- Narbul
- Ngarrabul
- Ngoorabul

== Sources ==
- Anderson, Eric (2016). Plants of Central Queensland: Identification and Uses of Native and Introduced Species. Csiro Publishing. ISBN 978-1-486-30226-0.
- Boorabee and The Willows. Australian Government Department of the Environment. 23 May 2013. Archived from the original on 15 November 2018.
- Gray, Jeannie; Fraser, Ian (2013). Australian Bird Names: A Complete Guide. Csiro Publishing. ISBN 978-0-643-10471-6.
- MacPherson, John (1902). "Ngarrabul and other aboriginal tribes. Part 1". Proceedings of the Linnean Society of New South Wales. 27: 637–647 – via BHL.
- MacPherson, John (1904). "Ngarrabul and other aboriginal tribes: distribution of tribes". Proceedings of the Linnean Society of New South Wales. 29: 677–684. doi:10.5962/bhl.part.20175 – via BHL.
- MacPherson, John (1939). "Eucalyptus in the daily life and medical practice of the Australian aborigines". Mankind. 2 (6): 175–180. doi:10.1111/j.1835-9310.1939.tb00957.x.
- Tindale, Norman Barnett (1974). "Ngarabal (NSW)". Aboriginal Tribes of Australia: Their Terrain, Environmental Controls, Distribution, Limits, and Proper Names. Australian National University Press. ISBN 978-0-708-10741-6.
