= Glen Innes, New South Wales =

Glen Innes
- Town
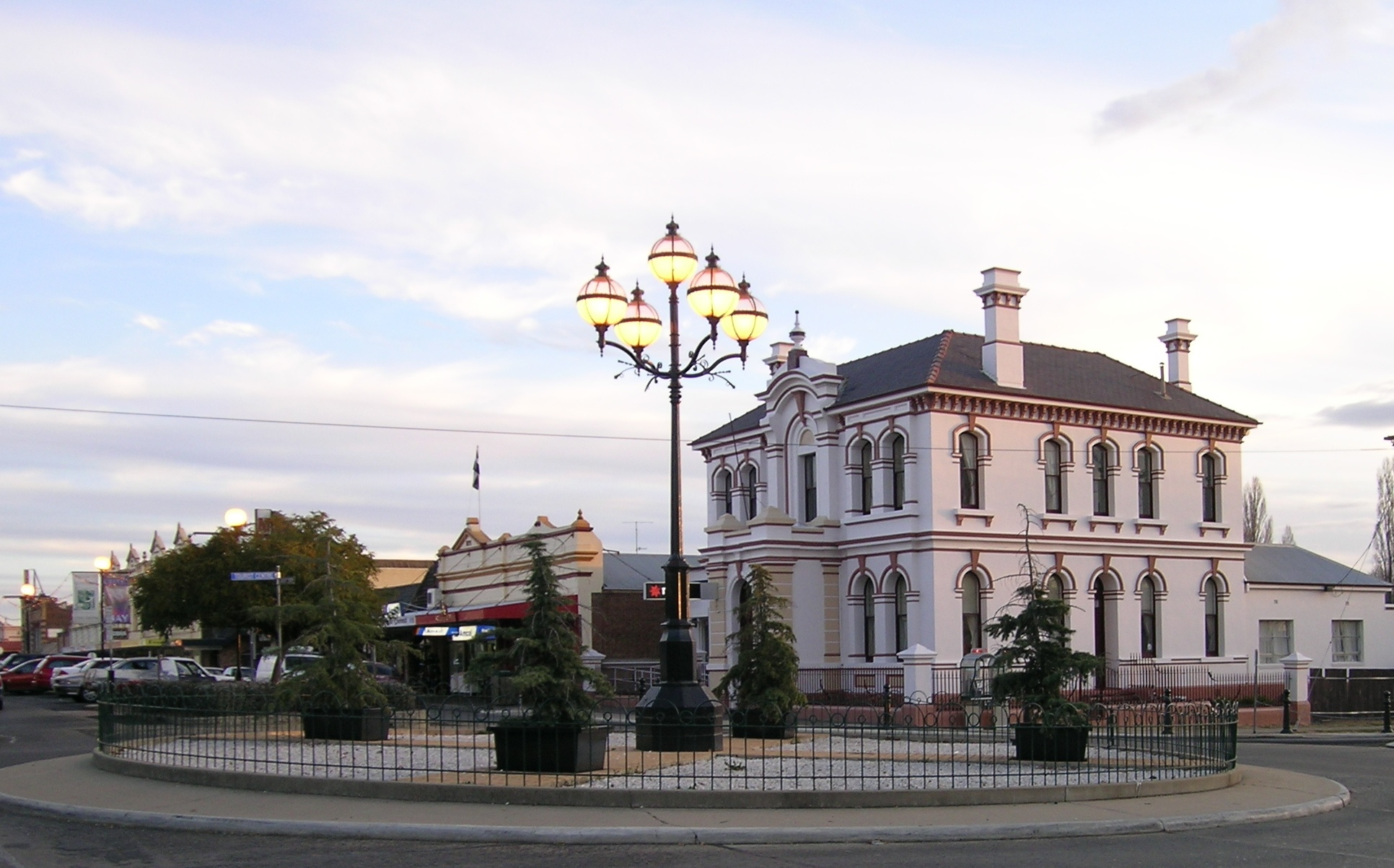
- Grey Street, Glen Innes

- Coordinates: 29°45′00″S 151°44′10″E
- Country: Australia
- State: New South Wales
- LGA: Glen Innes Severn Shire Council
- Location: 608 km (378 mi) N of Sydney; 367 km (228 mi) SW of Brisbane; 161 km (100 mi) W of Grafton; 100 km (62 mi) N of Armidale; 61 km (38 mi) E of Inverell
- Established: 1852

Government
  - State electorate: Northern Tablelands
  - Federal division: New England
- Elevation: 1,062 m (3,484 ft)

Population
  - Total: 6,219 (2021 census)
- Time zone: UTC+10 (AEST)
  - Summer (DST): UTC+11 (AEDT)
- Postcode: 2370
- County: Gough
- Mean max temp: 20.2 °C (68.4 °F)
- Mean min temp: 7.3 °C (45.1 °F)
- Annual rainfall: 856.5 mm (33.72 in)

Glen Innes is a parish and town on the Northern Tablelands, in the New England region of New South Wales, Australia. It is the centre of the Glen Innes Severn Shire Council. The town is located at the intersection of the New England Highway and the Gwydir Highway. At the 2021 census, Glen Innes had a population of 6,219

== History ==
The original owners of Glen Innes and surrounding areas are the Ngarabal people. The Ngarabal name of the township of Glen Innes is Gindaaydjin, meaning "plenty of big round stones on clear plains". The arrival of European settlers saw the significant disruption of the life of Ngarabal people. Many Ngarabal people continue to live in the Glen Innes area, still practising many aspects of their traditional culture and way of life.

In about 1838 Archibald Boyd registered the first run in the Glen Innes district. Two stockmen known as "the Beardies" because of their long beards took Boyd to this area to establish his run. The Beardies later introduced other squatters to the best runs in the area to become known as the Land of the Beardies or Beardie Plains.

Furracabad Station was suggested by John James Galloway as an alternative to Wellingrove for a new town. However Furracabad Station was sold in the 1840s depression and passed to Major Archibald Clunes Innes, then to the Bank of Australasia, then to John Major, who sold it to Archibald Mosman. The name Glen Innes is believed to be bestowed by Mosman in honour of Innes. Glen Innes was gazetted as a town in 1852 and the first lots were sold in 1854. The post office was established in August 1854 and the court in 1858 when they replaced the Wellingrove offices. In 1866 the population was about 350, with a telegraph station, lands office, police barracks, courthouse, post office and two hotels. There was still no coach service at this time, but in the 1870s a road was constructed to Grafton.

Tin was first discovered at Emmaville in 1872 and Glen Innes became the centre of a mining bonanza during the late 19th century. In 1875, the population had swelled to about 1,500 and the town had a two-teacher school, three churches, five hotels, two weekly newspapers, seven stores and a variety of societies and associations. On 19 August 1884 the new Main North railway from Sydney opened. The arrival of the rail service and the expansion of mining contributed a new prosperity in the town, which is reflected in some of the beautiful buildings there.

The centre of the town retains some of its federation buildings and the owners have painted these buildings in the traditional colours. Many of these buildings have been placed on the Register of the National Estate.

The town boasts a railway station that was once part of the Main North Line. Today, the line is closed so the station is not in use and the buildings have been repurposed.

== Heritage listings ==
Glen Innes has a number of heritage-listed sites, including:

- Bourke Street: Glen Innes Showground
- Grey Street: Glen Innes Post and Telegraph Office
- Main Northern railway: Glen Innes railway station
- Main Northern railway, 694.371 km: Yarraford Rail Bridge over Beardy River

== Demographics ==
Historical population
Year	Pop.	±%
1921	4,974	—
1933	5,352	+7.6%
1947	5,453	+1.9%
1954	5,842	+7.1%
1961	5,773	−1.2%
1966	5,756	−0.3%
1971	5,770	+0.2%
1976	5,953	+3.2%
1981	6,052	+1.7%
1986	5,971	−1.3%
1991	6,140	+2.8%
1996	6,101	−0.6%
2001	5,722	−6.2%
2006	5,944	+3.9%
2011	6,135	+3.2%
2016	6,155	+0.3%
2021	6,219	+1.0%
Source: Australian Bureau of Statistics data.

According to the 2021 census of Population, there were 6,219 people in Glen Innes.

- Aboriginal and Torres Strait Islander people made up 8.8% of the population.
- 82.3% of people were born in Australia. The next most common country of birth was England at 2.1%.
- 87.5% of people spoke only English at home.
- The most common responses for religion were No Religion 30%, Anglican 24.2%, and Catholic 18.2%

== Industries ==
The Glen Innes district has been a producer of wool, sheep and beef cattle since it was first settled. Sapphires are mined in the creek valleys immediately west of town, and while tin is no longer commercially mined, mineral exploration is ongoing. The town holds regular livestock sales in the local sale-yards. The town contains all of the regular service industries required by the community. Notable individual businesses include a photographic processing facility, an exporter of waste material balers, a large cattle feedlot, and transport depots. Sawmilling was historically a major industry of the district, but is now only conducted on a reasonable scale by the local minimum-security prison. The conversion of State Forests into National Parks has led to tourism becoming an important employer.

== Climate ==
Glen Innes is 1,062 metres (3,484 ft) AHD with an average annual rainfall of 901.8 millimetres (35.50 in). The climate is officially classed as a temperate oceanic climate (Köppen: Cfb). The area records some of Australia's coldest minimum temperatures outside the Snowy Mountains and Tasmania, with mild to warm summers and cold, windy winters with regular frosts and occasional snowfalls, though many snowfalls do not settle. Glen Innes's highest recorded temperature was 37.3 °C (99.1 °F) on 22 December 2019, and its coldest was −12.8 °C (9.0 °F) on 8 July 2002. Rainfall is heaviest in late spring, owing to the effects of the surrounding mountains, causing uplift which in turn causes frequent, heavy storms during this period. At 6:33 AM on 19 July 2019, the town registered a temperature of −12.3 °C (9.9 °F), making it the coldest place in Australia in that year.

Climate data for Glen Innes Airport AWS (1996–2022); 1,044 m AMSL; 29.68° S, 151.69° E
Month	Jan	Feb	Mar	Apr	May	Jun	Jul	Aug	Sep	Oct	Nov	Dec	Year
Record high °C (°F)	37.2 (99.0)	36.9 (98.4)	32.7 (90.9)	28.7 (83.7)	23.9 (75.0)	22.1 (71.8)	20.4 (68.7)	27.7 (81.9)	29.0 (84.2)	32.0 (89.6)	35.2 (95.4)	37.3 (99.1)	37.3 (99.1)
Mean daily maximum °C (°F)	26.6 (79.9)	25.8 (78.4)	24.0 (75.2)	20.7 (69.3)	16.9 (62.4)	13.8 (56.8)	13.4 (56.1)	15.0 (59.0)	18.4 (65.1)	21.2 (70.2)	23.2 (73.8)	25.3 (77.5)	20.4 (68.7)
Mean daily minimum °C (°F)	13.0 (55.4)	12.9 (55.2)	11.0 (51.8)	6.7 (44.1)	2.2 (36.0)	0.2 (32.4)	−1.0 (30.2)	−0.9 (30.4)	2.5 (36.5)	5.8 (42.4)	9.0 (48.2)	11.5 (52.7)	6.1 (43.0)
Record low °C (°F)	2.3 (36.1)	2.8 (37.0)	−3.4 (25.9)	−6.0 (21.2)	−9.8 (14.4)	−11.6 (11.1)	−12.8 (9.0)	−12.8 (9.0)	−8.0 (17.6)	−5.2 (22.6)	−1.1 (30.0)	−1.7 (28.9)	−12.8 (9.0)
Average rainfall mm (inches)	99.7 (3.93)	87.7 (3.45)	89.8 (3.54)	48.4 (1.91)	47.7 (1.88)	54.0 (2.13)	53.9 (2.12)	50.4 (1.98)	58.0 (2.28)	82.4 (3.24)	118.1 (4.65)	111.7 (4.40)	901.8 (35.51)
Average rainy days (≥ 1.0 mm)	8.0	7.1	6.7	4.0	4.6	5.6	5.8	5.1	5.5	7.2	8.6	9.4	77.6
Average afternoon relative humidity (%)	52	56	52	50	51	56	52	46	45	46	54	51	51
Source: Bureau of Meteorology

== Culture and tourism ==
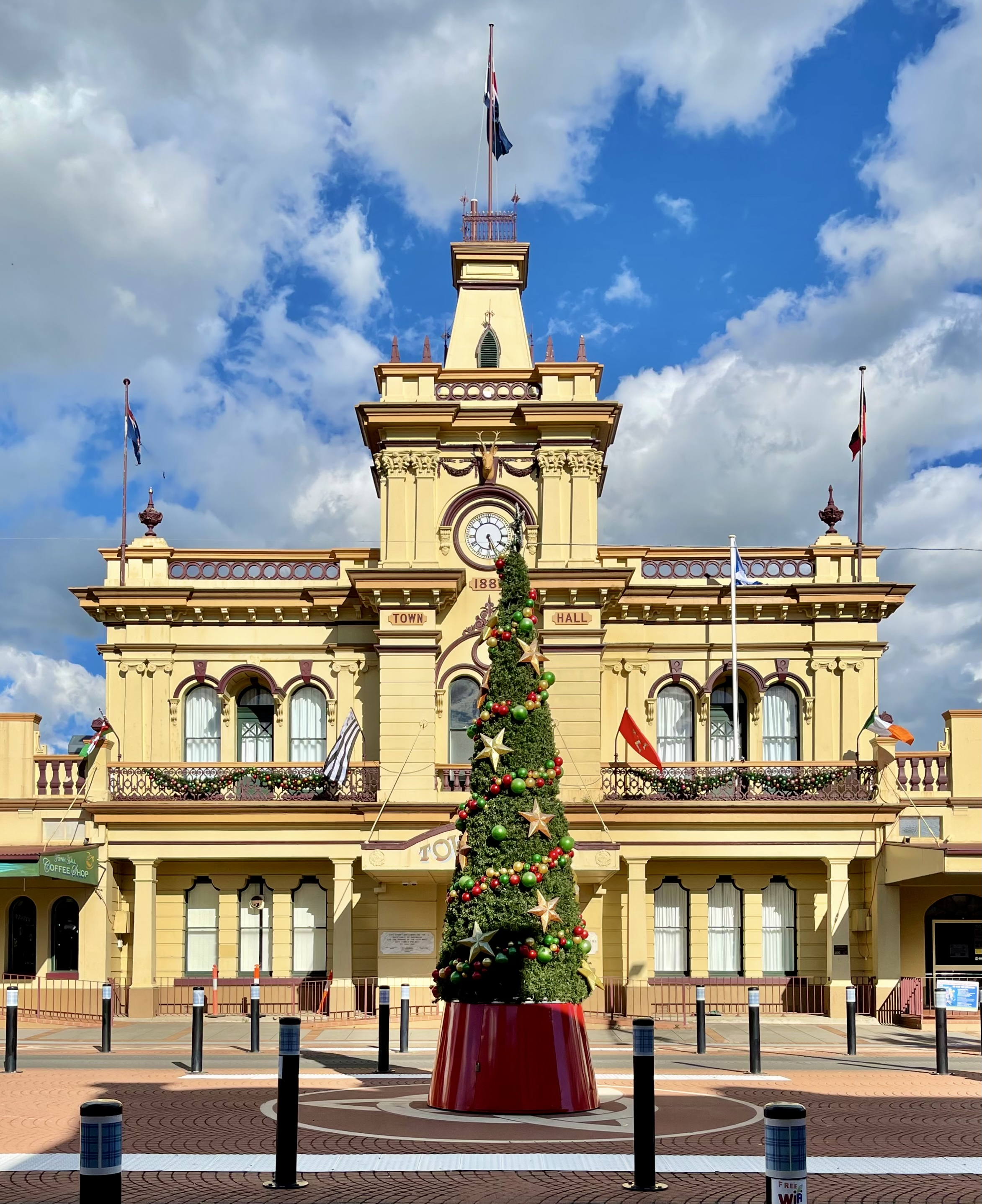
Town Hall, Glen Innes, NSW.

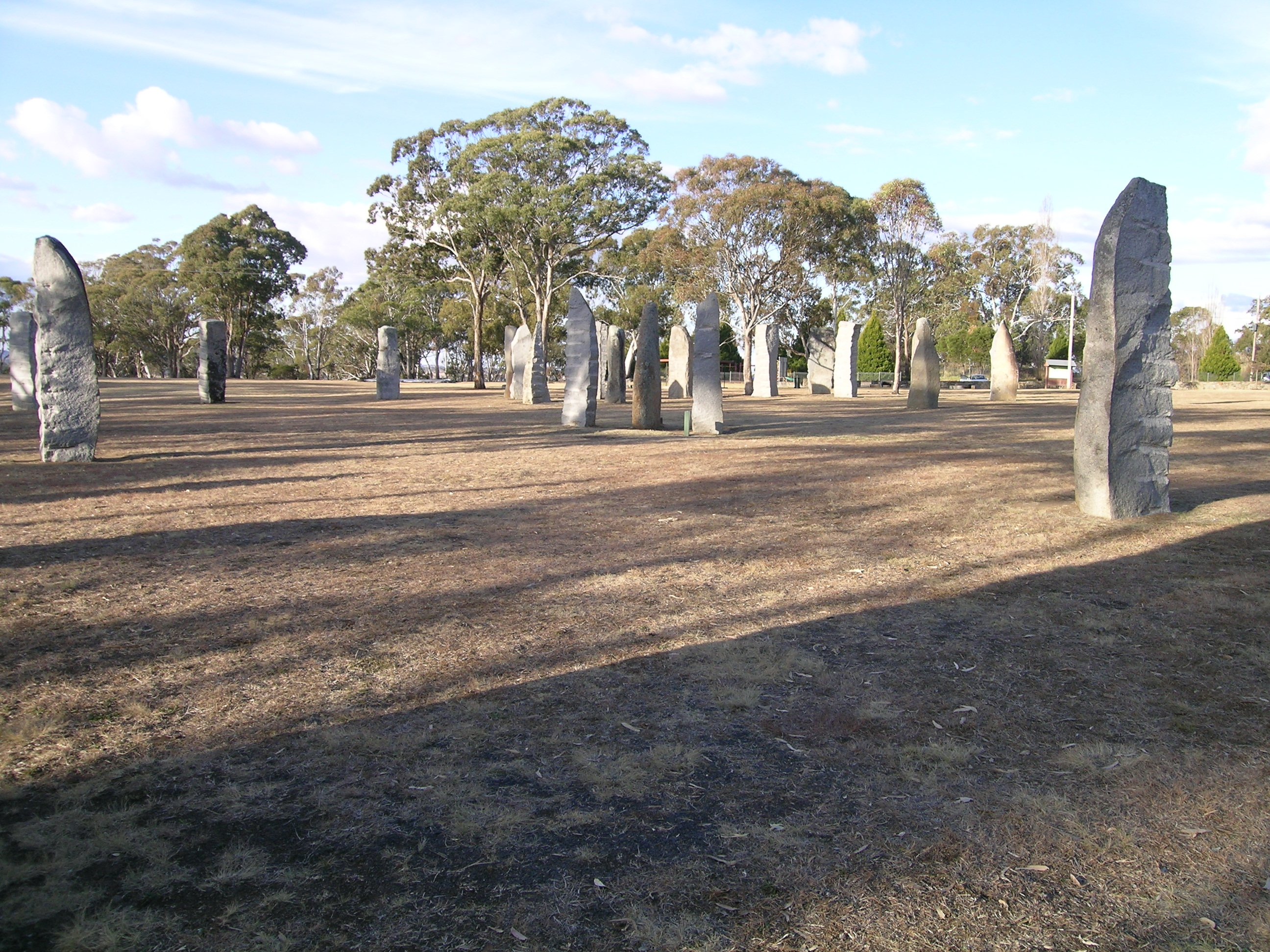
Standing Stones, Glen Innes, NSW.

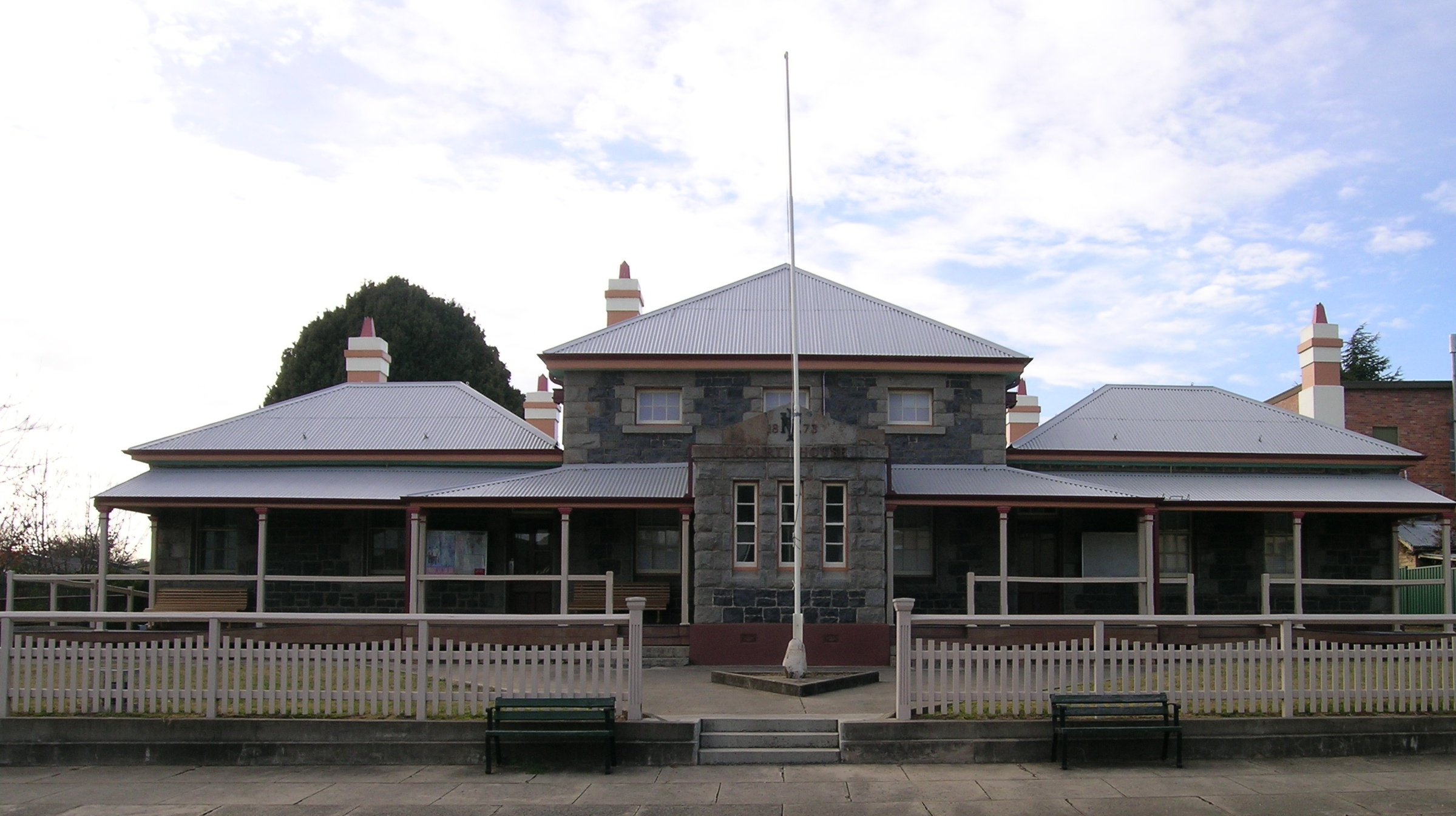
Glen Innes Court House, which was built in 1873.

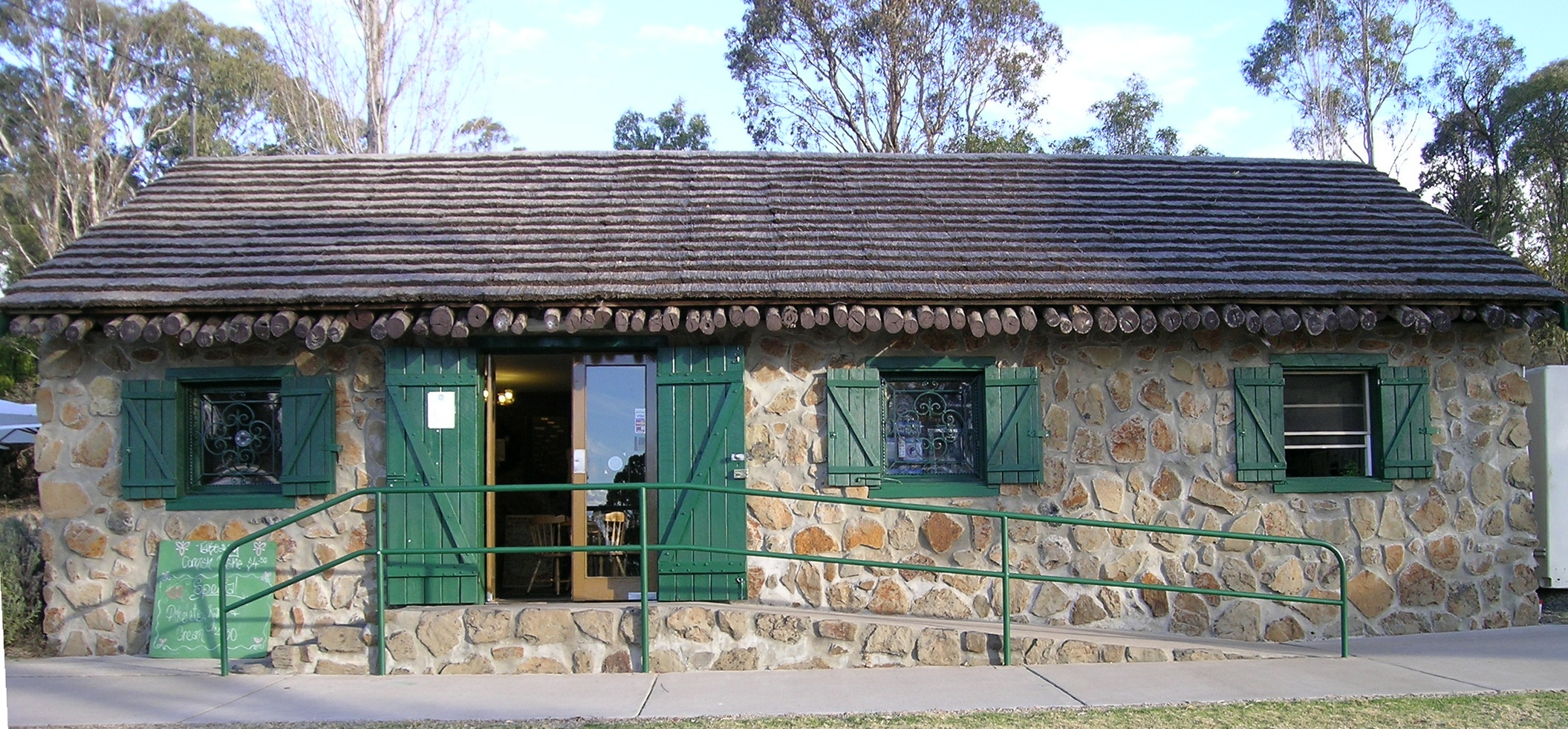
Crofters cottage, Glen Innes, NSW

Among the many attractions of this area are the extensive Land of the Beardies History Museum with its collection of biographical and historical records, the town parks, fishing, fossicking areas, Gibraltar Range National Park, several waterfalls, the Australian Standing Stones, which are large monoliths and the World Heritage listed Washpool National Park.

There are several Christian churches, including the Cameron Memorial Uniting Church and St Andrews Presbyterian Church, which hail from the town's Scottish roots; as well as the Holy Trinity Anglican and St Patrick's Catholic Churches, Baptist, Assembly of God, Seventh Day Adventist and other smaller congregations.

Annual events include: Minerama, a gem and fossicking festival; the Australian Celtic Festival, Land of the Beardies Festival, Pastoral and Agricultural Show and also horse racing, the Glen Innes Cup.

The Glen Innes Arts Council produces their own theatrical productions throughout the year and presents travelling productions and film screenings. It is the longest continuously running arts council in Australia, housed in their venue, The Chapel Theatre. The chapel is equipped with a state-of-the-art, 3D Digital Cinema system with Dolby 7.1 Sound. Information on Glen Innes Arts Council productions and screenings can be found at their website – https://www.gleninnesartscouncil.com

The town also has a thriving arts and crafts community, with a public art gallery, the Glen Innes Art Gallery that hold regular and changing exhibitions each year.

== Sport ==
The most popular sport in Glen Innes is rugby league. The town's team, the Glen Innes Magpies, play in the Group 19 Rugby League A-Grade competition.

Glen Innes has annual competitions and representative teams in the following: Golf, Rugby League, Rugby Union, Soccer, Lawn Bowls, Tennis, Netball, Basketball, Cricket, Squash, Touch Football, Tent Pegging, Campdrafting, Shooting, Sheepdog trials, Roller Skating and Roller Hockey.

In 1989 the Rugby Union team won the "New England Cup" beating Armidale City in the Grand Final.

== Media ==
Local newspapers are provided by Glen Innes News and Glen Innes Examiner which both publish online as well as in print.

ABC New England North West broadcast to the town on 819 AM and community radio station, 2CBD FM which broadcasts on 105.9FM in Glen Innes and 91.1FM in Deepwater.

Glen Innes receives TV from SBS and ABC and the owned and operated commercial stations of Seven, Nine (now owned by WIN Corporation) and 10 Northern NSW.

== Notable residents ==
Glen Innes was the birthplace of writer D'Arcy Niland, High Court judge Edward McTiernan, parasitologist Dame Bridget Ogilvie and architects Colin Madigan and Nancy Allen. Notable Former Residents: Bishop Thomas Absolem McCabe, the first bishop of Wollongong whose grave is in St Francis Xavier Cathedral grounds, Wollongong, Margaret Fulton, Australia's first and most famous real-food cookbook author and Garry McDonald of "Norman Gunston" and "Mother and Son" fame. Other prominent families in this district include the Gaden, Rodgers, Williams, Cameron, Donnelly, McIntyre, Williamson and Newsome families.

The district has produced several sportsmen and women who have represented Australia. These include two Olympians (Debbie Wells and David Cooper), Rugby League players Reg O'Keefe and John Ferguson, pistol shooters Bruce Favell and Robert Landers, masters athletics world champion Neville McIntyre and Andrew McIntyre (Tentpegging).

Two of the more highly decorated armed servicemen that still have family in the district were Peter Turnbull and Charles Curnow Scherf. Another major contributor to the wars from Glen Innes was Edward (Ted) Kinsella who was a soldier and army official who was stationed in Greece, Gallipoli and France.

== Glen Innes and Scotland ==
Archibald Clunes Innes, from Thrumster, Caithness was a captain in the Third Regiment (Buffs), when he arrived in Australia in 1822 on the Eliza in charge of 170 convicts. He held a number of New England properties including Glen Innes Station and Dundee station.

Glen Innes has a number of street signs in Scottish Gaelic (though no residents speak the language). There is also a "Crofter"'s cottage.

The Australian Standing Stones are based on the Ring of Brodgar in Orkney (a non-Gaelic speaking area) or Calanais in Lewis.

Pitlochry is Glen Innes' twin town in Scotland.

Other towns nearby with Scottish names include Armidale, Ben Lomond and Glencoe. The name of nearby Inverell is also of Scottish Gaelic origin, meaning "meeting place of the swans" in reference to the black swans once typically seen on the Macintyre River.

== Twin towns ==
Glen Innes has twin town status with Pitlochry in Scotland, and Mosman in Sydney.

== Wind farm ==
Glen Innes is home to a turbine wind farm (White Rock Wind farm) which the New South Wales Government approved 23 km west of the town. There are 70 turbines standing 150 metres high. Stage 2, consisting of another 49 turbines and a Solar Farm have also received approval from the NSW Government.

== See also ==
- Glen Innes Correctional Centre
