= Scrub Creek, Queensland =

Scrub Creek
- Suburb
- Interactive map of Scrub Creek
- Coordinates: 27.0316°S 152.4261°E
- Country: Australia
- State: Queensland
- LGA: Somerset Region
- Location: 7.9 km (4.9 mi) NE of Toogoolawah; 25.4 km (15.8 mi) N of Esk; 32.7 km (20.3 mi) SW of Kilcoy; 89.4 km (55.6 mi) N of Ipswich; 125 km (78 mi) NW of Brisbane CBD

Government
  - State electorate: Nanango
  - Federal division: Blair

Area
  - Total: 31.3 km^{2} (12.1 sq mi)

Population
  - Total: 33 (2021 census)
  - Density: 1.054/km^{2} (2.73/sq mi)
- Time zone: UTC+10:00 (AEST)
- Postcode: 4313
Suburbs around Scrub Creek
Gregors Creek	Gregors Creek	Gregors Creek
Braemore	Scrub Creek	Fulham
Braemore	Cressbrook	Fulham

Scrub Creek is a rural locality in the Somerset Region, Queensland, Australia. In the 2021 census, Scrub Creek had a population of 33 people.

== Geography ==
The Brisbane River flows through the south-western corner. Dayspring Creek enters from the east, becomes Scrub Creek in the centre, and flows into the Brisbane River in the south-east.

The Brisbane Valley Highway passes to the south-west of the locality.

== History ==
Scrub Creek State School opened circa 1933. It closed in 1955. It was at 238 Scrub Creek Road (27.0402°S 152.4080°E).

== Demographics ==
In the 2016 census, Scrub Creek had a population of 32 people.

In the 2021 census, Scrub Creek had a population of 33 people.

== Education ==
There are no schools in Scrub Creek. The nearest government primary schools are Toogoolawah State School in Toogoolawah to the south and Harlin State School in Harlin to the north-west. The nearest government secondary schools are Toogoolawah State High School in Toogoolawah to the south and Kilcoy State High School in Kilcoy to the north-east.
