= Braemore, Queensland =

Braemore
- Suburb
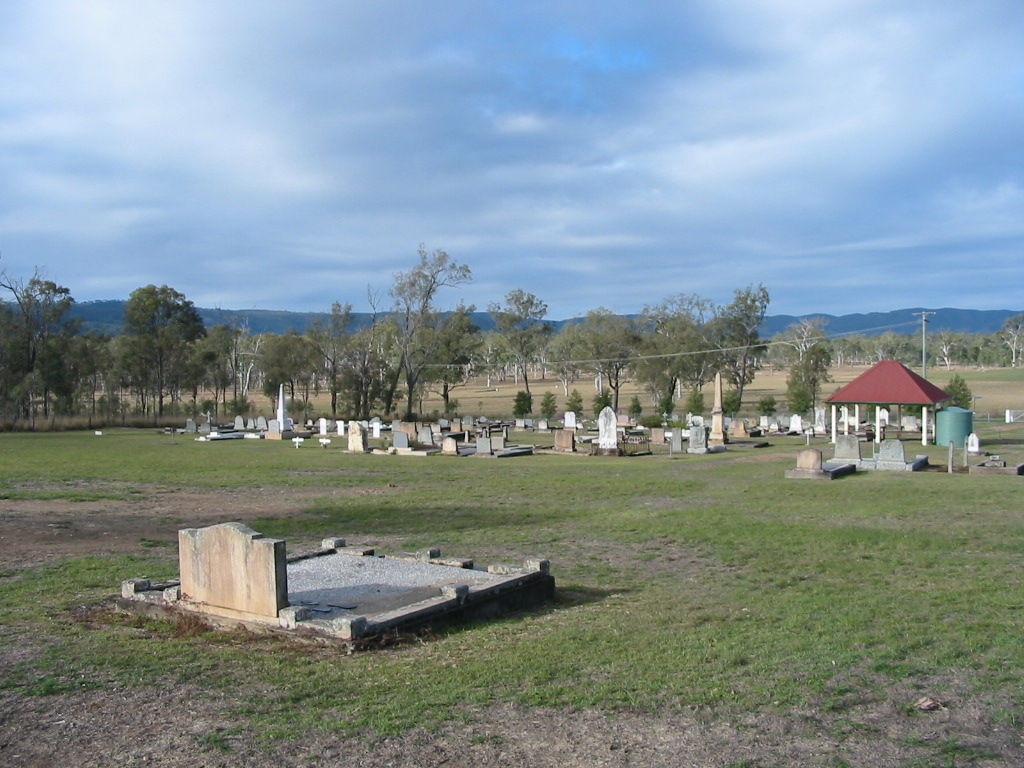
- Toogoolawah Cemetery on Cemetery Road, Braemore, 2005

- Interactive map of Braemore
- Coordinates: 27.0399°S 152.3844°E
- Country: Australia
- State: Queensland
- LGA: Somerset Region
- Location: 5.4 km (3.4 mi) N of Toogoolawah; 22.9 km (14.2 mi) N of Esk; 86.9 km (54.0 mi) NNW of Ipswich; 124 km (77 mi) NW of Brisbane

Government
  - State electorate: Nanango
  - Federal division: Blair

Area
  - Total: 10.3 km^{2} (4.0 sq mi)

Population
  - Total: 131 (2021 census)
  - Density: 12.72/km^{2} (32.94/sq mi)
- Time zone: UTC+10:00 (AEST)
- Postcode: 4313
Suburbs around Braemore
Gregors Creek	Gregors Creek	Scrub Creek
Yimbun	Braemore	Scrub Creek
Ivory Creek	Toogoolawah	Cressbrook

Braemore is a rural locality in the Somerset Region, Queensland, Australia. In the 2021 census, Braemore had a population of 131 people.

== Geography ==
The Brisbane River forms the north-eastern boundary.

The Brisbane Valley Highway runs through from south-east to west.

== Demographics ==
In the 2016 census, Braemore had a population of 138 people.

In the 2021 census, Braemore had a population of 131 people.

== Education ==
There are no schools in Braemore. The nearest government primary schools are Toogoolawah State School in neighbouring Toogoolawah to the south and Harlin State School in Harlin to the north. The nearest government secondary school is Toogoolawah State High School, also in Toogoolawah.

== Facilities ==
Despite the name, Toogoolawah Cemetery is on Cemetery Road in Braemore (27.0574°S 152.3791°E). It is operated by the Somerset Regional Council.
