= Linville railway station =

Railway station in Queensland, Australia

Coordinates: 26.8438°S 152.2758°E

Linville
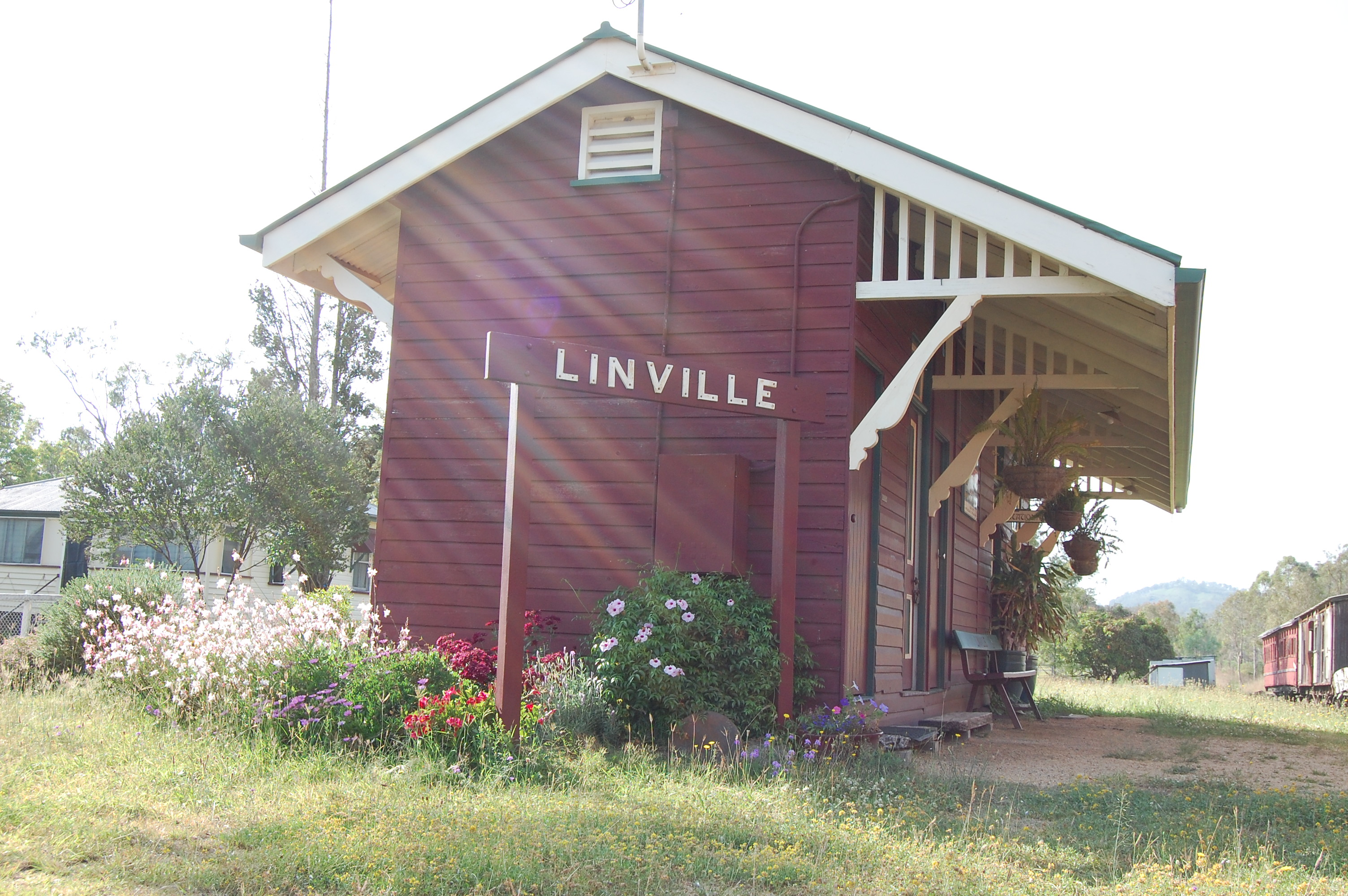
- Linville railway station

General information
- System: Regional rail
- Line: Brisbane Valley

History
- Opened: 22 November 1910
Location

Linville Railway station was the largest railhead for beef cattle in South East Queensland, the second largest in the southern hemisphere. Linville is a small town in the Somerset Region local government area.

In 1910, the Brisbane Valley railway line reached Linville.

== See also ==
- Brisbane Valley Rail Trail
- Rail transport in Queensland
