= The Bluff, Queensland =

The Bluff, Queensland, Australia, may refer to:

- The Bluff, Queensland (Ipswich), a suburb in City of Ipswich
- The Bluff, Queensland (Toowoomba Region), a locality in the Toowoomba Region

== See also ==
- Bluff, Queensland, a town
