= Brisbane Valley Rail Trail =

Rail trail in Queensland, Australia

Brisbane Valley Trail

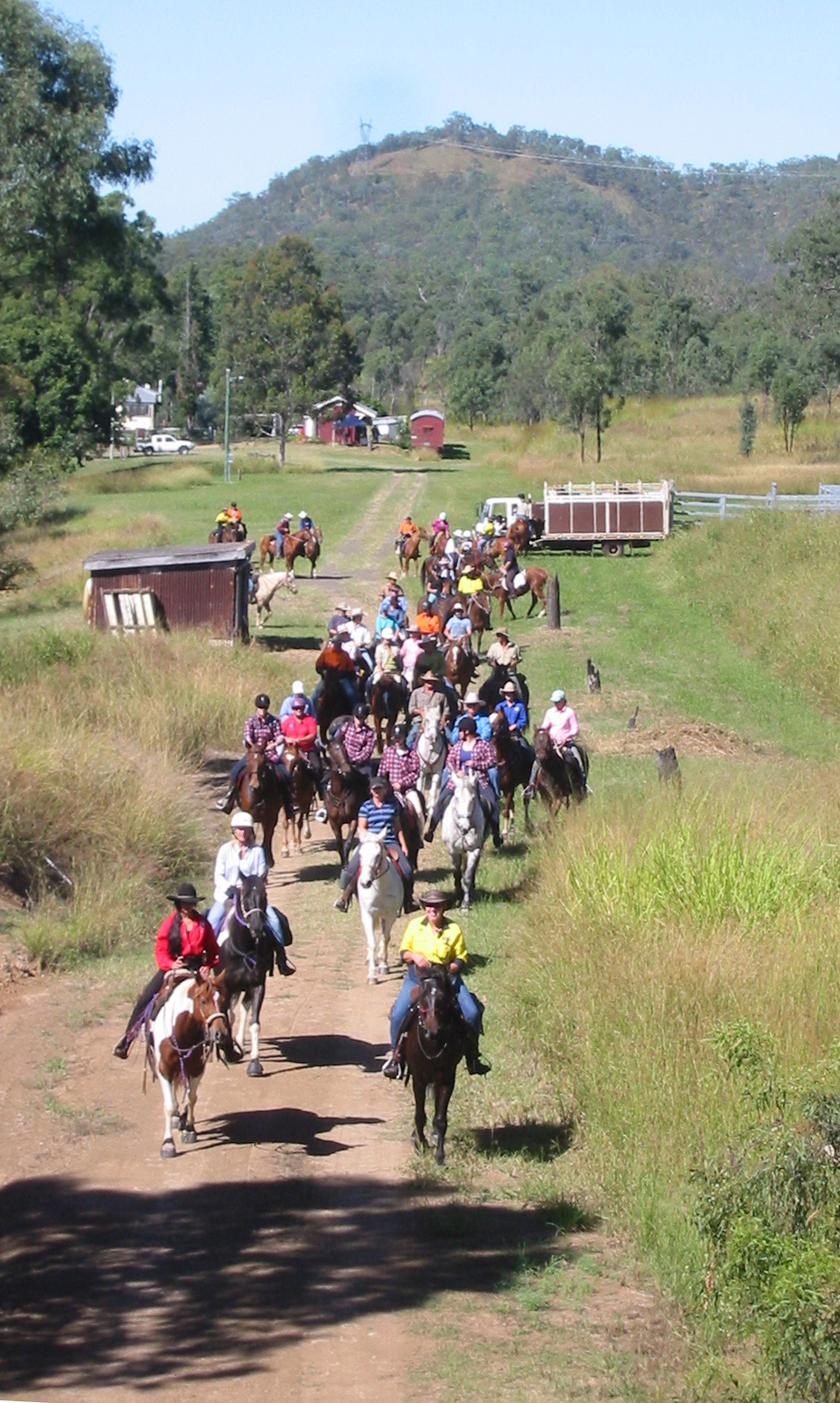
Horse riders on the trail, 2010

The Brisbane Valley Rail Trail (BVRT) is a 161-kilometre (100 mi) recreation trail from Wulkuraka in the City of Ipswich, via the Somerset Region to Yarraman in the Toowoomba Region, all within Queensland, Australia. The trail follows the old Brisbane Valley railway line and is open to walkers, touring cyclists and horse riders. The trail details the history and landscape of the Brisbane Valley. It is the longest rail trail in Queensland and in Australia.

== Route ==
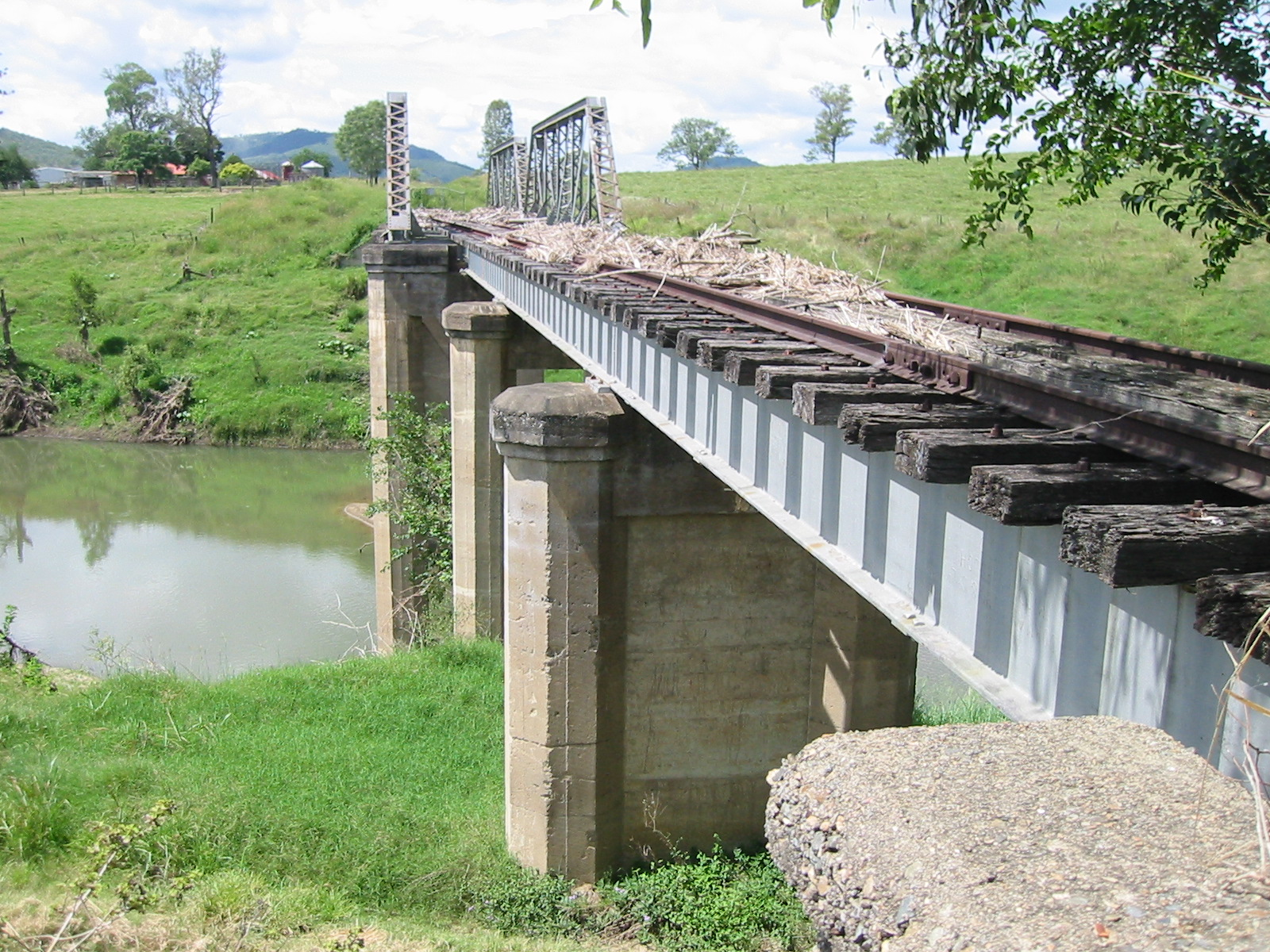
Harlin Rail Bridge, 2011

The top end of the trail is located in Yarraman on Australia's Great Dividing Range – north-west of Brisbane and directly west of the Sunshine Coast. The Yarraman to Moore section of the trail includes Blackbutt, Benarkin and Linville and is located in the upper reaches of the Brisbane River valley and crosses the Blackbutt Range. The trail head at Moore is located opposite the Moore Memorial Hall in Stanley Gates Park and is approximately 51 kilometres (32 mi) north of Esk. Moore is 144 kilometres (89 mi) from Brisbane (via the Bruce and D'Aguilar Highways or the Warrego, Brisbane Valley and D’Aguilar Highways). Benarkin and Blackbutt are located on the D’Aguilar Highway, and are also convenient access points to the Bicentennial National Trail.

Construction of the missing link between the trailheads at Moore and Toogoolawah began in late 2017, and was officially opened in August 2018. Prior to this, a deviation via local roads was used as a connecting route between the two former trailheads.

The southern end of the trail is located at Wulkuraka Station in Ipswich. The Wulkuraka Station to Toogoolawah section includes Fernvale, Lowood, Coominya and Esk.

The new concrete pavement section from Wulkuraka Station to Diamantina Boulevard in Ipswich is Stage 4 of the Ipswich City Council Brassall Bikeway. It breaks into dirt and gravel after a few kilometres, and returns to concrete in towns.

== Conditions ==
The Department of Transport and Main Roads is the state agency responsible for the day-to-day management and maintenance of the Brisbane Valley Rail Trail in conjunction with Ipswich City, Somerset, South Burnett and Toowoomba Regional Councils, and the Ambassadors of the BVRT.

The trail is for walking, cycling and horse riding. The surface is not suitable for road/racing bicycles.

The section from Fernvale to Lowood is home to the annual Rail Trail Fun Run and has an excellent degraded granite surface and is most suitable for families with children looking for a short excursion.

== History ==
The 20th anniversary of the construction of the first section of the Brisbane Valley Rail Trail from Fernvale to Lowood was celebrated in July 2022.

Prior to 2018, there remained one incomplete section from Toogoolawah to Moore, which was officially opened in August 2018.

The Lockyer Creek Railway Bridge at Clarendon was opened to users in late 2018, after a restoration costing $4.5 million.

== Heritage listings ==
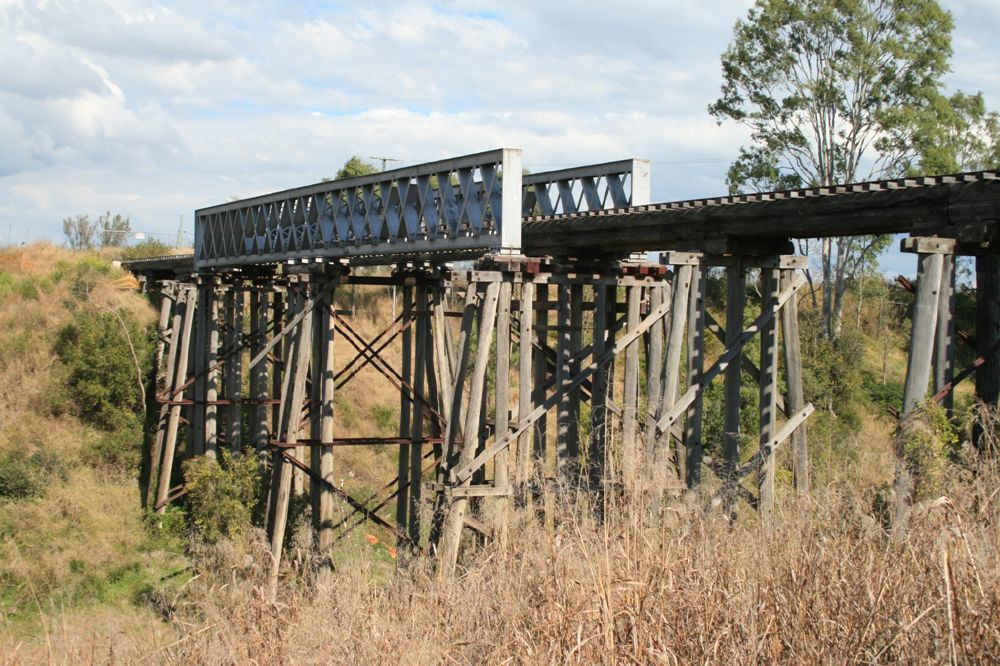
Lockyer Creek Railway Bridge (Clarendon) (2008) prior to restoration.

Lockyer Creek Railway Bridge at Clarendon was listed on the Queensland Heritage Register on 21 October 1992.

Yimbun Railway Tunnel was listed on the Queensland Heritage Register on 27 November 2008.
