= Harlin Rail Bridge =

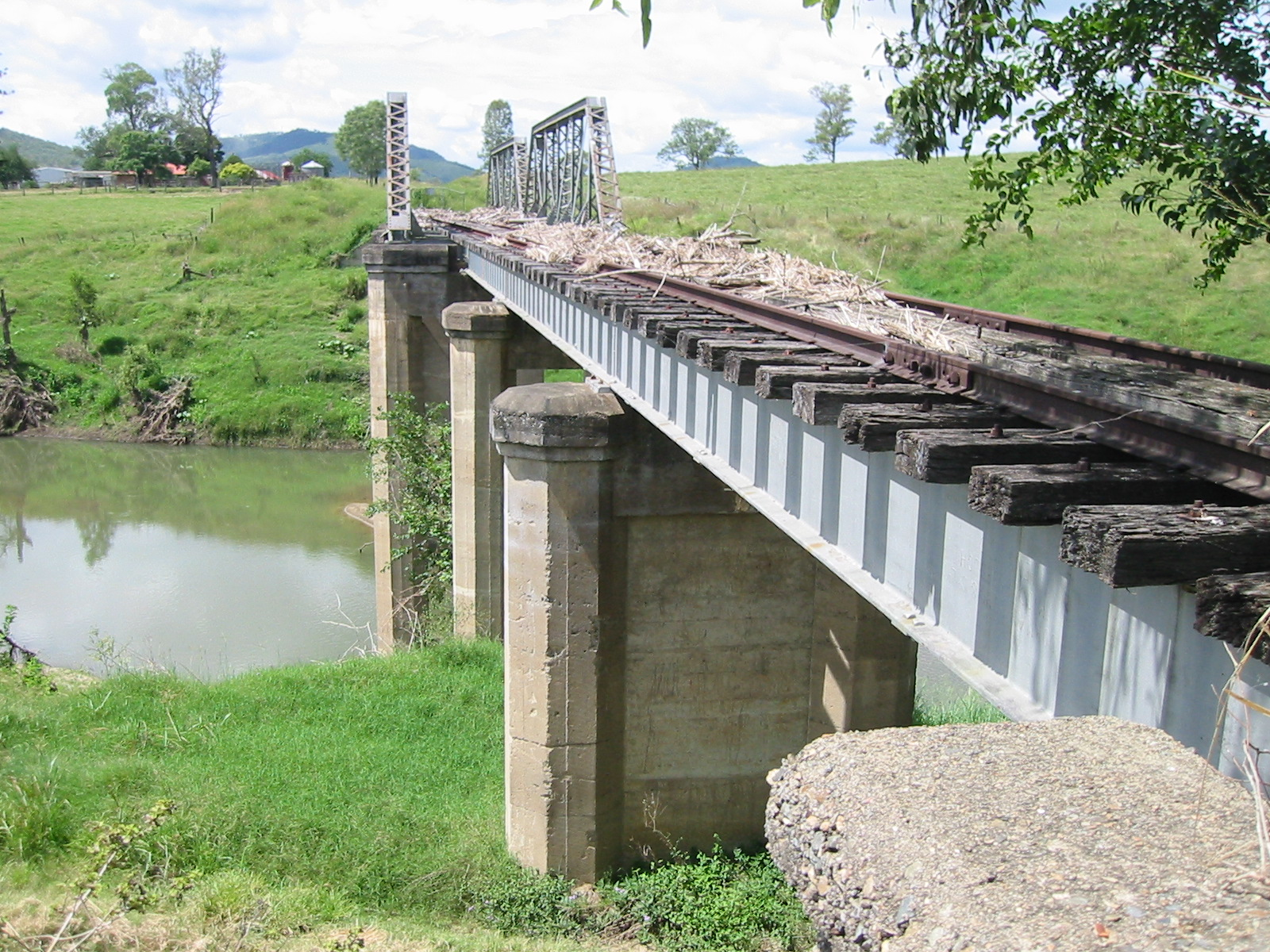
- Harlin Rail Bridge, 2011

- Location within Queensland Location within Australia
- 26.975°S 152.3641°E
- Location: over Ivory (formerly Maronghi) Creek, Harlin, Somerset Region, Queensland, Australia

History
- Design period: 1900–1914 (early 20th century)
- Built: 1910

Site notes
- Architect: Queensland Railways

Queensland Heritage Register
- Official name: Harlin Rail Bridge
- Type: state heritage (built)
- Designated: 27 November 2008
- Reference no.: 602636
- Significant period: 1910–
- Significant components: bridge/viaduct – railway
- Builders: Queensland Railways

Harlin Rail Bridge is a heritage-listed railway bridge (now ruins) over Ivory (formerly Maronghi) Creek at Harlin, Somerset Region, Queensland, Australia. It was designed by Queensland Railways and built in 1910 by Queensland Railways. It was added to the Queensland Heritage Register on 27 November 2008. It was destroyed in 2013 as a consequence of flooding associated with Cyclone Oswald.

== History ==
The Harlin Rail Bridge, which crossed Ivory Creek (previously Maronghi Creek) at Harlin was located 61 miles 20 chains (98.6 km) from Wulkuraka railway station. It was a half-through Pratt truss (or pony truss) bridge built between 1909 and 1910 and was the only surviving concrete and steel railway bridge on the Brisbane Valley railway line. This line was developed as a branch line from the main Brisbane–Toowoomba rail line. It was constructed from Wulkuraka near Ipswich to Lowood (1884), then extended to Esk (1886), then Toogoolawah (February 1904), Yimbun (September 1904), Linville (1910), Benarkin and Blackbutt (1911) and finally to Yarraman (1913). Originally intended that the line would eventually meet the Gympie to Nanango rail line to serve as a rail connection to Gympie and be a shorter route between the South Burnett and Brisbane, the final linking section was never constructed.

The Upper Brisbane Valley was settled by squatters in the 1840s and the timber industry in the Brisbane Valley also dates from this period. Closer settlement began in the 1870s. The timber industry quickly developed thereafter as land was rapidly cleared by selectors and the increased population of Brisbane and Ipswich from the 1870s demanded timber for housing and fuel on a continuing basis. The first sawmills in the Brisbane Valley, established in the 1870s, were located at Rosewood, Dundas and Colinton.

Closer settlement of the Brisbane Valley had progressed sufficiently by 1877 for the country from Walloon via Esk and Nanango to be examined as a possible route for a railway to Gympie. In 1879 Queensland Premier Thomas McIlwraith approved the building of several branch lines, including one to Esk. However, the original plans for these branch lines were withdrawn from parliamentary consideration in 1880 on the recommendation of Francis Thomas Gregory, Member of the Queensland Legislative Council. In spite of this opposition, in 1881 the Queensland Parliament approved the building of the Brisbane Valley branch line from Wulkuraka to Esk. The contract for the first section was let to O'Rourke and McSharry in October 1882 with Henry Charles Stanley acting as Chief Engineer. This section to Lowood, a place that scarcely existed before the railway, opened on 16 June 1884. The Brisbane Valley Branch Line was the second branch line in Queensland after the Dugandan railway line, which opened to Harrisville in 1882. Within weeks an extension of the line from Lowood to Esk was approved in August 1884 by Premier Samuel Griffith. Henry Charles Stanley remained as Chief Engineer but HA Brigg was appointed as the contractor. The second section to Esk opened on 9 August 1886 and remained the terminus for more than 17 years, becoming an important centre and livestock loading point.

During the 1880s closer settlement of the Brisbane Valley intensified. Land from Cressbrook Station was resumed and settled. In 1889 James McConnel began selling off small parcels of land from his property Cressbrook to his workers for dairying. The railway, which provided rapid and cheap transport to Brisbane, fostered the timber industry's development. Over the next 30 years sawmills were established at Lowood, Esk, Toogoolawah, Moore, Linville, Harlin, Blackbutt, Monsildale and Perseverance as well as a number of portable sawmills operating in stands of timber.

In the late 19th century four dairy factories operated in the Brisbane Valley and utilised the railway for transporting milk and its products. Lowood dairy factory opened in 1890. Toogoolawah dairy factory (managed by Cressbrook Dairy Company) and Colinton Dairy Factory (managed by Standard Dairy Co Ltd) opened in 1898, while the Esk dairy factory opened in 1904. Circa 1898 Cressbrook Condensed Milk Factory, owned by James McConnel and owner/manager Colin Munro, opened on the banks of Cressbrook Creek. The factory and seven dairy farms that supplied it were purchased by Nestlé in 1907 and remained in operation until 1930 with local dairy farmers supplying its milk.

In 1900 a parliamentary inquiry was conducted to determine the best route for a proposed rail line to Nanango. James McConnel of Cressbrook stated that an extension of the Brisbane Valley Railway Line would enable selectors to pursue dairying rather than grazing and to cultivate the land. The inquiry subsequently recommended a 45-kilometre (28 mi) extension of the Brisbane Valley Branch Line to Moore, which was approved in December of the same year. The first section, to the new township of Toogoolawah, which was the site of the Cressbrook Condensed Milk Factory, opened on 8 February 1904. On 1 September 1904 the extension to Yimbun was opened and remained the terminus until 1910.

To access the vast timber resources beyond Yimbun a further extension of the line to Blackbutt was considered. The Blackbutt Tableland was notable as a rich farming district, that the railway was expected to expand. On the ranges hoop and bunya pines were already being exploited, and with conservation it was expected that freight for the railway would be supplied for many years. At Moore there were two sawmills operating and there were two more in the Blackbutt area. Plans for the 28 miles (45 km) of rail line from Yimbun to Blackbutt were approved at a Committee meeting on S.S. Lucinda on 9 January 1907. They were introduced into Parliament on 13 March 1908 and passed on 1 April 1908.

The Commissioner of Railways' report on the Blackbutt extension noted that substantial bridges would be needed at five sites including over Maronghi Creek and all were to be built with timber. However, the bridges over both Maronghi and Emu Creeks were built of steel and concrete. In 1908 drawings of a standard 62-foot (19 m) span were drawn up for the Harlin Rail Bridge. In the following year materials for the building of railway bridges over Maronghi Creek and Emu Creek and the Yimbun tunnel were purchased. The tender for cast iron cylinders for the steel bridges over Maronghi and Emu Creeks was won by Bundaberg Foundry with a quote of £562/18/0 in 1909. They also won the tender for the same supplies for a bridge over Neerkol Creek (Central Western railway line). Walkers, Maryborough were contracted to supply other materials for these bridges.

The type of bridge constructed over Maronghi Creek at Harlin was a half-through Pratt truss structure. This bridge type differed subtly from the more widely used through Pratt truss bridge in that its girders were not high enough to allow cross bracing at the top between the trusses on each side of the bridge. Half-through Pratt truss bridges were designed to carry a lesser load than through Pratt truss bridges.

The Harlin Rail Bridge was built by the Resident Engineer Hugh Fraser using day labour from a team of 250 men stationed at Harlin. The practice of using day labour instead of contractors began in 1901 and continued for the next quarter of a century. In 1909 there were temporary timber girders for the approach spans as the Engineer waited for supplies from Walkers. By 20 January 1910 Walkers' supply of material for the bridges over Maronghi and Emu Creeks was 13½ weeks overdue. As an alternative, two 60-foot (18 m) open girder spans intended for Neerkol Creek Bridge were diverted to Maronghi Creek Bridge. In May 1910 a construction train crossed this bridge for the first time on its way to Harlin railway station. The extension to Blackbutt was completed during 1911.

This section of the Brisbane Valley Rail Line was built under the 1895 Railways Guarantee Act which provided for local authorities to request construction of a railway by guaranteeing to meet any losses and the interest on capital borrowed for construction. The Railways Department was also required to share any deficit equally with the guarantors. The guarantee ended after 14 years unless a profit was made for three consecutive years, at which time it ceased. The cost to the residents in the benefited area served by the rail line including the Harlin Bridge in the financial year 1913–1914 was £3389. Of this amount the Esk Shire Council paid £2000, Crow's Nest Shire Council £194, Nanango Shire Council £490 and Treasury £705. The nett revenue of the Brisbane Valley Branch Line was positive until the 1917–18 financial year after which the line experienced a period of losses until 1932 following which it again returned substantial nett revenues.

The next section of the Brisbane Valley Rail Line, to Yarraman, was approved by parliament in December 1910 and opened on 1 May 1913. The last section required to complete the loop to Gympie was approved by parliament on 30 October 1918 but was never built.

Passenger services were a feature of the Brisbane Valley Line from the commencement of the service. From 1913 a passenger service ran from Yarraman to Ipswich three days a week, taking six hours. In 1928 rail motor services commenced on the Brisbane Valley railway line and when new rail motors were introduced the Brisbane Valley line, together with the Dugandan line, was the first to use them. Although limited to 48 kilometres per hour (30 mph) and averaging no more than 30–35 kilometres per hour (19–22 mph) they were faster, more comfortable and reliable than road transport or mixed trains.

By 1920 much of the forest timber had been cut out of the Brisbane Valley and the major industry was dairying. Accordingly, in the 1920s, the railway was transporting cream to the butter factories along the Brisbane Valley line - Colinton until 1921, Toogoolawah, Esk and Lowood. Whole milk was transported to the Nestle and Anglo-Swiss Condensed Milk Factory at Toogoolawah until its closure in 1930. However, on the Blackbutt Range timber was still being cut and transported via rail. In 1934 The Courier-Mail reported increased timber haulage from railway loading centres between Benarkin and Yarraman. The amount was more than 1,500,000 super feet per month over the prior 12 months and formed the biggest proportion of freight on the Brisbane Valley railway line. All the timber was being cut from Crown reserves as privately held land was practically cut out. Most of the timber was sent to Brisbane for milling.

During the 1930s revenue from the Brisbane Valley line was greater than expenditure on the line and by 1938 revenue exceeded expenditure and interest on the capital for its construction. In the 1930s and 1940s the Brisbane Valley Line to Esk handled a large volume of passengers and goods due to the construction of Somerset Dam on the Stanley River for flood mitigation and water storage for Brisbane, Ipswich and the lower Brisbane Valley. From 1935 the Brisbane Valley Rail Line handled construction material for the site. Esk became the transhipping depot equipped with cranes for heavy loads. Goods were then transported to the dam site along 18 miles (29 km) of bitumen road that the Stanley River Works Board, in conjunction with the Mains Road Commission, constructed for this purpose. Somerset dam was completed in 1959 after a period of abeyance from 1942 to 1948 due to World War II. Post-war, as road transport replaced rail for both goods and passengers, usage of the Brisbane Valley rail line declined.

In 1955 the concrete and steel bridge over Emu Creek, which was built at the same time as Harlin Rail Bridge, was washed away by flood waters and was later rebuilt in timber. After this flood pier number 6 of Harlin Rail Bridge was filled in with concrete for additional support. In 1961 piers 3, 4 and 5 were strengthened.

After flood damage in 1974 the Brisbane Valley Branch Line was threatened with permanent closure but re-opened after several months. Nevertheless, the last Yarraman rail motor ran on 6 October 1988. Afterwards a passenger service operated from Ipswich to Toogoolawah until March 1993 when the Brisbane Valley Branch Line closed. The steel track, many of the bridges, most railway signage, station platforms and goods sheds have been removed. Many of the station buildings on the Brisbane Valley Rail Line have been re-used on other lines or sold for removal. The only remaining buildings are at Yarraman, Linville and Lowood (now serving as railway museums) and Toogoolawah, Esk and Coominya. Much of the railway infrastructure from Blackbutt to Moore and from Wulkuraka to Lowood has been removed.

The bridge was severely damaged during flooding in 2013 caused by Cyclone Oswald, with most of the structure reported to have been washed away. The secretary of the Brisbane Valley Rail Trail stated at the time "I can't say whether the damage can be repaired at this time; I must say in fairness that the damage is very extensive", while following that they would "explore funding options for its restoration". A 2016 article described the bridge as having been "lost".

Following the destruction of the bridge, there are now only two large engineering structures left on the Brisbane Valley rail line. These are the steel and timber Lockyer Creek railway bridge over Lockyer Creek at Clarendon designed by Chief Engineer HC Stanley and the Yimbun Railway Tunnel. Approximately two dozen timber rail bridges are still intact, although their condition varies greatly.

== Description ==
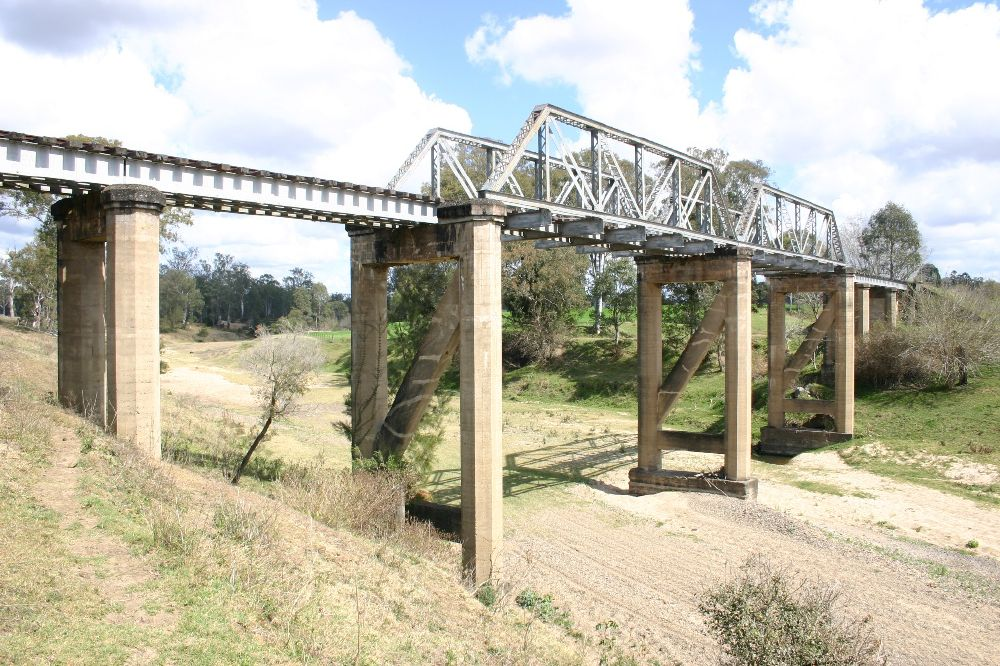
Harlin Rail Bridge, 2008

The Harlin Rail Bridge was a high-level steel and concrete bridge over Maronghi Creek, located 61 miles 20 chains (98.6 km) from Wulkuraka on the former Brisbane Valley Branch Rail Line. Its total length was 275 feet (84 m) and its maximum span was 60 feet (18 m). The bridge had two steel 8 panel half-through Pratt trusses and was supported by two concrete abutments and six concrete piers. It had a long, earth embankment approach from the north (approximately 75 metres (246 ft)) and a shorter approach from the south (approximately 10 metres (33 ft)).

The bridge comprised (south-north):

- 2 x 3 x 31-foot (9.4 m) rolled steel joists, concrete abutment, common concrete piers
- 2 x 60-foot (18 m) 8 panel through Pratt trusses, common concrete piers
- 3 x 3 x 31-foot (9.4 m) rolled steel joists, common concrete piers, concrete abutment.

It retained its sleepers and rail lines until its destruction.

== Heritage listing ==
Harlin Rail Bridge was listed on the Queensland Heritage Register on 27 November 2008 having satisfied the following criteria.

The place is important in demonstrating the evolution or pattern of Queensland's history.

The Harlin Rail Bridge, opened in 1910, is important surviving evidence of the Brisbane Valley Branch Rail Line. Establishment of Queensland's branch rail network, which began in the 1880s, was vital for the development of the colony through opening land for closer settlement and freighting produce and resources to Queensland's major towns and ports.

The Brisbane Valley Rail Line, when commenced in 1882, was the second of Queensland's branch lines. Over the ensuing 30 years it was extended several times to facilitate the transportation of timber, livestock and agricultural produce and was intended to become an alternative, shorter route from the South Burnett to Brisbane.

In contrast to other branch lines, revenue from the Brisbane Valley Branch Line was greater than its expenses for the majority of the period from 1902 until the outbreak of World War II when reporting by the Commissioner of Railways on the profitability of individual lines ceased.

The Harlin Rail Bridge is one of only two surviving major rail bridges of the Brisbane Valley Branch Line, the other being the Lockyer Creek Railway Bridge at Clarendon.

The place demonstrates rare, uncommon or endangered aspects of Queensland's cultural heritage.

The Harlin Rail Bridge is a form of railway bridge that has always been uncommon and remains so. It is one of approximately seven half-through Pratt truss bridges that were built by the Queensland Department of Railways and Public Works during the first two decades of the twentieth century. The structure is intact and retains a high level of integrity. Other bridges of this type known to have been constructed include the Comet River bridge, Comet (superstructure replaced 2005); Reid River bridge, Reid River (demolished); Reids Creek bridge, Gayndah (extant); Barmundu bridge, Barmundu (modified); and Yabba Creek bridge, Imbil (intact).

The place is important in demonstrating the principal characteristics of a particular class of cultural places.

The Harlin Rail Bridge is a good example of a half-through Pratt truss railway bridge designed by the Department of Railways and Public Works while William Pagan was Chief Engineer. This bridge type differed subtly from the through Pratt truss in that its girders are not high enough to allow cross bracing at the top of the truss, which is a feature of through Pratt truss bridges.

The bridge is highly intact and provides physical evidence of early twentieth century railway bridge design and construction in Queensland. The Harlin Rail Bridge illustrates the evolution in the principal characteristics of steel railway bridges around the turn of the century, especially the change to the through and half-through Pratt trusses from 1908, which increased the structural strength of rail bridges.
