= Ivory Creek, Queensland =

Ivory Creek
- Suburb
- Interactive map of Ivory Creek
- Coordinates: 27.0652°S 152.3177°E
- Country: Australia
- State: Queensland
- LGA: Somerset Region
- Location: 8.6 km (5.3 mi) NW of Toogoolawah; 26.9 km (16.7 mi) NNW of Esk; 90.9 km (56.5 mi) NNW of Ipswich; 122 km (76 mi) NW of Brisbane

Government
  - State electorate: Nanango
  - Federal division: Blair

Area
  - Total: 61.8 km^{2} (23.9 sq mi)

Population
  - Total: 49 (2021 census)
  - Density: 0.793/km^{2} (2.054/sq mi)
- Time zone: UTC+10:00 (AEST)
- Postcode: 4313
Suburbs around Ivory Creek
Harlin	Harlin	Yimbun
Harlin	Ivory Creek	Braemore
Eskdale	Biarra	Toogoolawah

Ivory Creek is a rural locality in the Somerset Region, Queensland, Australia. In the 2021 census, Ivory Creek had a population of 49 people.

== Geography ==
The locality is bounded to the west by the Biarra Range. It has two named peaks:

- Biarra (27.0289°S 152.3048°E) 429 metres (1,407 ft)
- Sugarloaf (27.0729°S 152.2702°E) 542 metres (1,778 ft)

The creek Ivory Creek enters the locality from the south-west (Eskdale) and flows through the locality exiting to the north (Harlin).

The land use is predominantly grazing on native vegetation with some irrigated crop-growing along the creek.

== History ==
The locality presumably takes its name from the creek, which in turn was named after James Ivory and Francis Jeffrey Ivory, two graziers who operated the Eskdale pastoral run. Francis Jeffrey was a Member of the Queensland Legislative Assembly and the Queensland Legislative Council.

Ivory's Creek Provisional School opened circa 1894. On 1 January 1909, it became Ivory's Creek State School. It closed circa 1914.

== Demographics ==
In the 2016 census, Ivory Creek had a population of 46 people.

In the 2021 census, Ivory Creek had a population of 49 people.

== Education ==
There are no schools in Ivory Creek. The nearest government primary schools are Toogoolawah State School in neighbouring Toogoolawah to the south-west and Harlin State School in neighbouring Harlin to the north. The nearest government secondary school is Toogoolawah State High School in Toogoolawah.
