= Woolmar, Queensland =

Woolmar
- Suburb
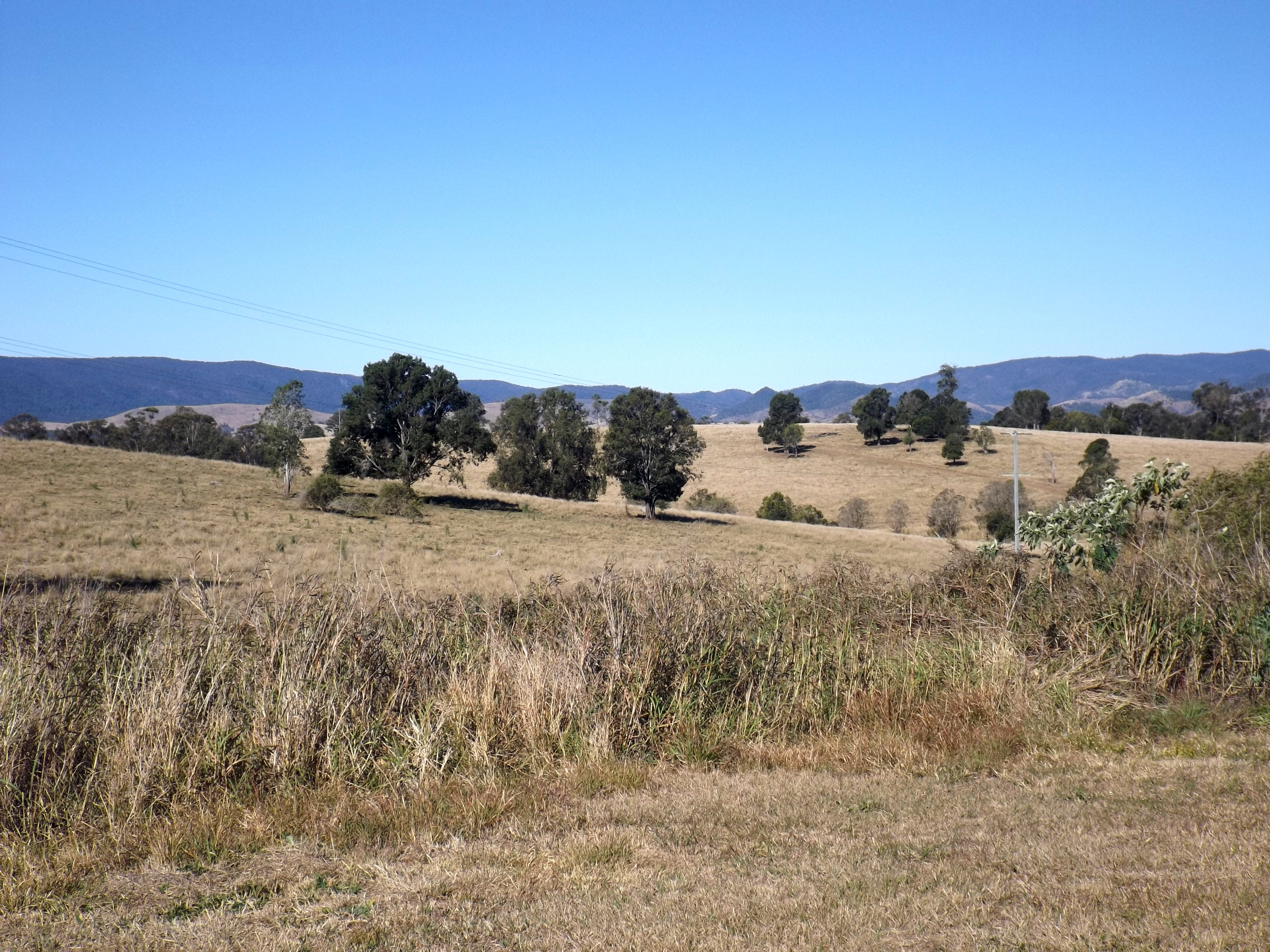
- Esk Kilcoy Road, 2015

- Interactive map of Woolmar
- Coordinates: 26.9277°S 152.5083°E
- Country: Australia
- State: Queensland
- LGA: Somerset Region
- Location: 2.5 km (1.6 mi) W of Kilcoy; 49.2 km (30.6 mi) NNE of Esk; 113 km (70 mi) NW of Brisbane

Government
  - State electorate: Nanango
  - Federal division: Blair

Area
  - Total: 67.9 km^{2} (26.2 sq mi)

Population
  - Total: 565 (2021 census)
  - Density: 8.321/km^{2} (21.55/sq mi)
- Time zone: UTC+10:00 (AEST)
- Postcode: 4515
Suburbs around Woolmar
Harlin	Sheep Station Creek	Sheep Station Creek
Harlin	Woolmar	Kilcoy
Gregors Creek	Hazeldean	Winya

Woolmar is a rural locality in the Somerset Region, Queensland, Australia. In the 2021 census, Woolmar had a population of 565 people.

== Geography ==
Woolmar is immediately west of Kilcoy.

Kilcoy Creek marks a small section of the eastern boundary. In the west elevated terrain reaches higher than 400 metres above sea level.

The D'Aguilar Highway passes through Woolmar.

== History ==
Woolmar Provisional School opened on 8 March 1894. On 1 January 1909, it became Woolmar State School. It had temporary closures in 1931 and 1940, closing permanently on 14 April 1941. It was at 5615 D'Aguilar Highway (26.9458°S 152.5224°E).

Gregor's Creek Provisional School opened on 14 February 1896. On 1 January 1909, it became Gregor's Creek State School. It closed in December 1963. It was at 1095 Gregors Creek Road (26.96012°S 152.44259°E), now in Woolmar.

== Demographics ==
In the 2016 census, Woolmar had a population of 421 people.

In the 2021 census, Woolmar had a population of 565 people.

== Education ==
There are no schools in Woolmar. The nearest government primary and secondary schools are Kilcoy State School and Kilcoy State High School in neighbouring Kilcoy to the east.

== Amenities ==
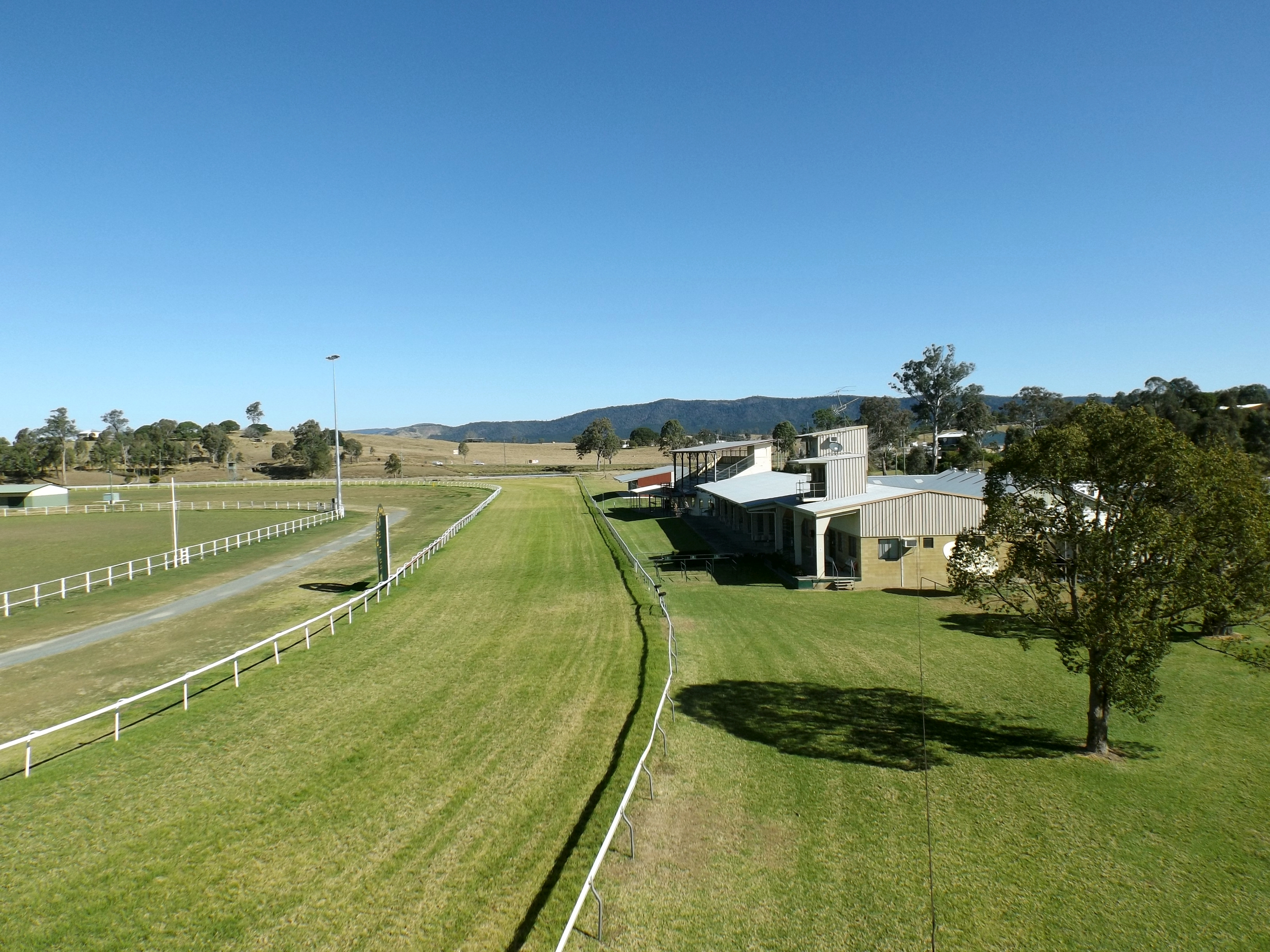
Kilcoy showgrounds, 2015

The Kilcoy Showgrounds and Racecourse are at 26 Showgrounds Road in Woolmar (26.9427°S 152.54904°E).

Kilcoy General Cemetery is on the western corner of the D'Aguilar Highway and Esk Kilcoy Road (26.9455°S 152.5431°E).
