= Gregors Creek, Queensland =

Gregors Creek
- Suburb
- Interactive map of Gregors Creek
- Coordinates: 26.9847°S 152.4097°E
- Country: Australia
- State: Queensland
- LGA: Somerset Region
- Location: 12.9 km (8.0 mi) NNE of Toogoolawah; 21.2 km (13.2 mi) WSW of Kilcoy; 30.4 km (18.9 mi) N of Esk; 94.5 km (58.7 mi) NNW of Ipswich; 122 km (76 mi) NW of Brisbane

Government
  - State electorate: Nanango
  - Federal division: Blair

Area
  - Total: 39.2 km^{2} (15.1 sq mi)

Population
  - Total: 87 (2021 census)
  - Density: 2.219/km^{2} (5.75/sq mi)
- Time zone: UTC+10:00 (AEST)
- Postcode: 4313
Suburbs around Gregors Creek
Harlin	Harlin	Woolmar
Harlin	Gregors Creek	Hazeldean; Fulham
Braemore; Yimbun	Scrub Creek	Scrub Creek

Gregors Creek is a rural locality in the Somerset Region, Queensland, Australia. In the 2021 census, Gregors Creek had a population of 87 people.

== Geography ==
The Brisbane Valley Highway runs along the south-western boundary.

The Brisbane River flows through from west to south-west. Gregors Creek (the watercourse) flows through from north-east to south-west, where it enters the Brisbane River.

The Deer Reserve State Forest (27.0006°S 152.4947°E) is in the east of the locality. The state forest is 2,894 hectares (7,150 acres) and extends into the neighbouring localities of Hazeldean to the east and Fulham to the south-east.

== History ==
The locality derives its name from the creek, which in turn was named by surveyor Robert Austin after pioneer Andrew Gregor who was killed on 10 October 1846 after being attacked by Aboriginals.

Gregor's Creek Provisional School opened on 14 February 1896. On 1 January 1909, it became Gregor's Creek State School. It closed in December 1963. It was at 1095 Gregors Creek Road (26.96012°S 152.44259°E), now in the neighbouring locality of Woolmar.

== Demographics ==
In the 2016 census, Gregors Creek had a population of 96 people.

In the 2021 census, Gregors Creek had a population of 87 people.

== Education ==
There are no schools in Gregors Creek. The nearest government primary school is Harlin State School in neighbouring Harlin to the west and Kilcoy State School in Kilcoy to the north-east. The nearest government secondary schools are Kilcoy State High School in Kilcoy and Toogoolawah State High School in Toogoolawah to the south-west..
