= Eskdale, Queensland =

Eskdale
- Suburb
- Interactive map of Eskdale
- Coordinates: 27.1486°S 152.2344°E
- Country: Australia
- State: Queensland
- LGA: Somerset Region
- Location: 18.8 km (11.7 mi) SW of Toogoolawah; 25.5 km (15.8 mi) NW of Esk; 89.5 km (55.6 mi) NW of Ipswich; 127 km (79 mi) NW of Brisbane

Government
  - State electorate: Nanango
  - Federal division: Blair

Area
  - Total: 146.1 km^{2} (56.4 sq mi)

Population
  - Total: 34 (2021 census)
  - Density: 0.233/km^{2} (0.603/sq mi)
- Time zone: UTC+10:00 (AEST)
- Postcode: 4312
Suburbs around Eskdale
Anduramba	Harlin	Ivory Creek
Anduramba	Eskdale	Biarra
The Bluff	Cressbrook Creek	Biarra

Eskdale is a rural locality in the Somerset Region, Queensland, Australia. In the 2021 census, Eskdale had a population of 34 people.

== Geography ==
The locality is bounded to the north-west by Maria Creek and to the south-east loosely by the Biarra mountain range (27.1333°S 152.2333°E).

The Esk Crows Nest Road enters the locality from the south-west (The Bluff) and exits to the south-east (Biarra).

Within the locality, there are two named mountain features:

- Round Mountain (27.2066°S 152.2138°E) rising to 459 metres (1,506 ft)
- Ivorys Gap (27.1586°S 152.2634°E)

== History ==
In 1877, 15,200 acres (6,200 ha) were resumed from the Eskdale pastoral run and offered for selection on 24 April 1877.

== Demographics ==
In the 2016 census, Eskdale had a population of 33 people.

In the 2021 census, Eskdale had a population of 34 people.

== Education ==
There are no schools in Eskdale. The nearest government primary schools are Blackbutt State School in Blackbutt to the north, Toogoolawah State School in Toogoolawah to the east, and Crow's Nest State School in Crows Nest to the south-west. The nearest government secondary schools are Yarraman State School (to Year 10) in Yarraman to the north-west, Toogoolawah State High School (to Year 12) in Toogoolawah to the east, and Crow's Nest State School (to Year 10) in Crows Nest to the south-west.
