= Cressbrook, Queensland =

Cressbrook
- Suburb
- Interactive map of Cressbrook
- Coordinates: 27.0819°S 152.4344°E
- Country: Australia
- State: Queensland
- LGA: Somerset Region
- Location: 7.2 km (4.5 mi) ENE of Toogoolawah; 23.3 km (14.5 mi) N of Esk; 123 km (76 mi) NW of Brisbane

Government
  - State electorate: Nanango
  - Federal division: Blair

Area
  - Total: 25.4 km^{2} (9.8 sq mi)

Population
  - Total: 121 (2021 census)
  - Density: 4.764/km^{2} (12.34/sq mi)
- Time zone: UTC+10:00 (AEST)
- Postcode: 4313
Suburbs around Cressbrook
| Braemore | Scrub Creek | Fulham |
| Braemore | Cressbrook | Lower Cressbrook |
| Toogoolawah | Mount Beppo | Lake Wivenhoe |

Cressbrook is a rural locality in the Somerset Region, Queensland, Australia. It is known for its recreational aviation facilities. In the 2021 census, Cressbrook had a population of 121 people.

== Geography ==
Cressbrook is a sparsely populated rural area with land used for crops and grazing; there is no urban centre. It is bounded by the Brisbane River to the north and east. Cressbrook Creek meanders from the west to the east of the locality where it enters the Brisbane River. The Cressbrook-Carboonbah Road traverses from the Brisbane Valley Highway in the north-west through the south-east of the locality towards Mount Beppo and beyond to Carboonbah.

== History ==
The locality of Cressbrook takes its name from the Cressbrook Homestead established by David Cannon McConnel in 1841, who came from the village of Cressbrook in Derbyshire, England.

In 1877, 15,700 acres (6,400 ha) were resumed from the Cressbrook pastoral run and offered for selection on 17 April 1877.

Cressbrook Provisional School was operating in 1881 but closed in 1882 due to low student numbers; its opening date is unknown.

In 1898, the McConnel family established a condensed milk factory at Cressbrook; it was sold to Nestlé in 1907.

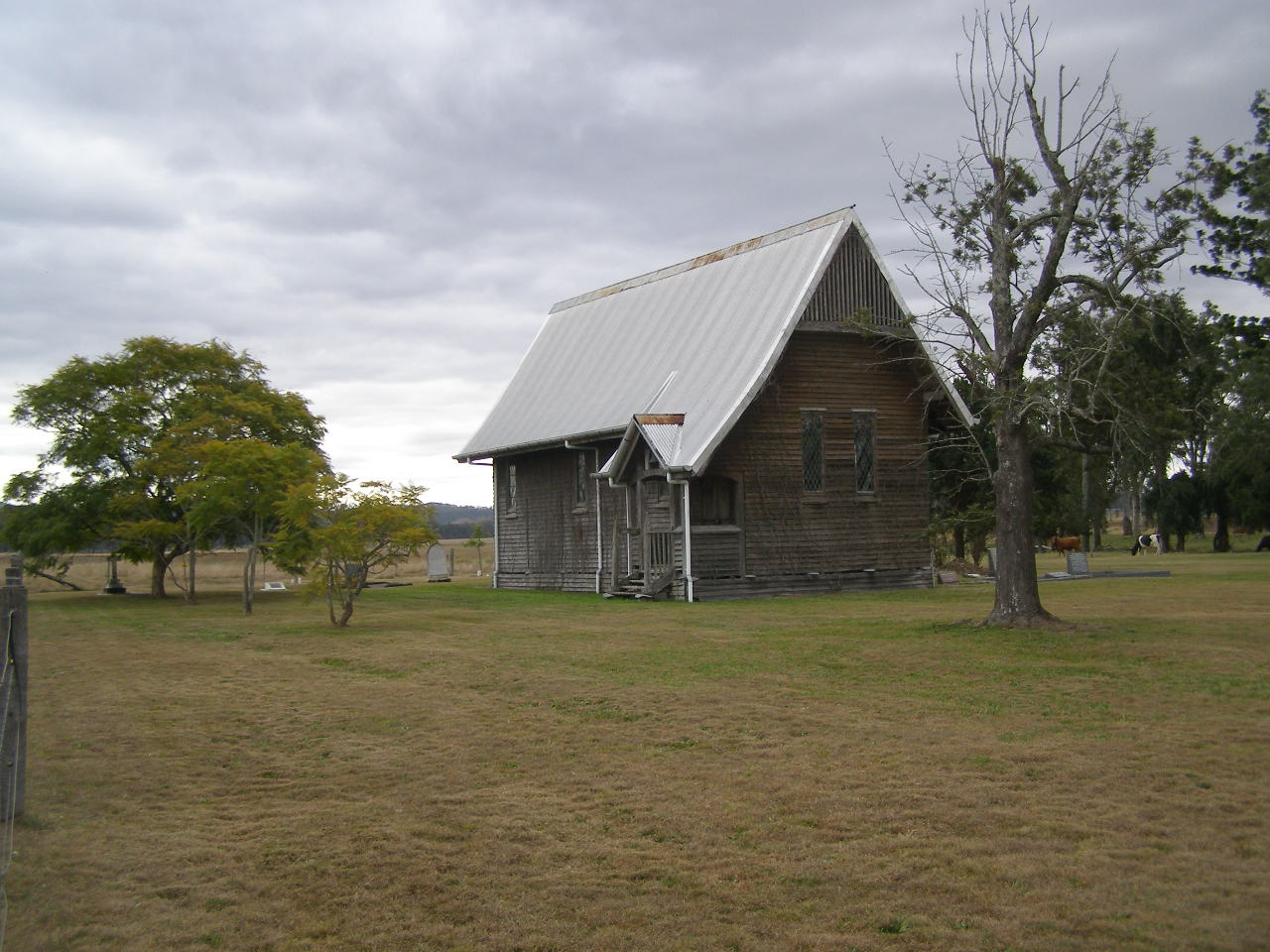
Victoria Chapel at the Cressbrook Homestead, 2010

On 1 June 1901, D. C. McConnel laid the first pile for the Victoria Chapel on the Cressbrook Homestead intended for the use of the McConnel family and their employees. It was a non-denominational chapel. Regular Anglican and Presbyterian services were held there and other denominations were served by visiting ministers.

Cressbrook Lower State School opened on 11 April 1916. It closed in 1953.

Fulham State School opened in 1920 and closed circa 1953. It was located at 372 Cressbrook Cabonah Road (southern corner with Fulham Road, 27.0771°S 152.4209°E, now in Cressbrook).

== Demographics ==
In the 2016 census Cressbrook had a population of 117 people.

In the 2021 census, Cressbrook had a population of 121 people.

== Education ==
There are no schools in Cressbrook. The nearest government primary and secondary schools are Toogoolawah State School and Toogoolawah State High School, both in neighbouring Toogoolawah to the south-west.

== Heritage listings ==
Cressbrook has a number of heritage-listed sites, including:

- Cressbrook Homestead, off Cressbrook-Caboombah Road

== Watts Bridge Memorial Airfield ==
The Watts Bridge Memorial Airfield (ICAO: YWSG) is in the south-east of the locality and provides facilities for sports and recreational aviation. There are three grass runways of length 900 metres (3,000 ft), 820 metres (2,690 ft) and 815 metres (2,674 ft). A number of aviation clubs operate from the airfield, flying vintage planes, gyroplanes, gliders, performing acrobatics and skydiving. Many recreational aviation events are held each year at the airfield.

The airfield was established in 1942 as part of Australia's defences during World War II and known as the Toogoolawah airfield. After the war, the airfield was no longer needed for defence purposes, the buildings were removed and the land was used for grazing. In the early 1980s, the desire for recreational airfield facilities resulted in a group of recreational pilots re-establishing the runways and taxiways, and reopening the airfield in 1990 as the Watts Bridge Memorial Airfield. The name Watts Bridge is a reference to a nearby bridge that crossed the Brisbane River connecting Silverleigh Road in Cressbrook to Cooeeimbardi Road in Lower Cressbrook and was named after local dairyman James Robert Watts. Having survived many floods of the Brisbane River, the bridge was washed away in the 1974 Brisbane flood and not replaced.
