= Somerset Region =

Coordinates: 27°14′21″S 152°25′04″E

- Local government area
- Location within South East Queensland

- Interactive map of Somerset Region
- Country: Australia
- State: Queensland
- Region: South East Queensland
- Established: 2008

Government
  - Mayor: Dr Jason Wendt
  - State electorates: Nanango; Lockyer; Moggil
  - Federal divisions: Blair; Ryan

Area
  - Total: 5,373 km^{2} (2,075 sq mi)

Population
  - Total: 25,057 (2021 census)
  - Density: 4.6635/km^{2} (12.0784/sq mi)
- Website: Somerset Region
LGAs around Somerset Region
South Burnett	Gympie	Sunshine Coast
Toowoomba	Somerset Region	Moreton Bay
Lockyer Valley	Ipswich	Brisbane

The Somerset Region is a local government area located in the West Moreton region of South East Queensland, Australia, northwest of the City of Brisbane. The region has five major towns; Esk, Fernvale, Kilcoy, Lowood and Toogoolawah. Somerset was created in 2008 from a merger of the shires of Esk and Kilcoy, and is also known as the Brisbane Valley, owing to the Brisbane River which courses through the region. However, significant parts of the region lie outside the hydrological Brisbane Valley.

The original shires of Esk and Kilcoy were amalgamated to consolidate the water catchments (or reservoirs) of the Wivenhoe and Somerset dams. The Local Government Reform Commission identified that the long-term future of Somerset would be as a major water catchment area for the South East Queensland region, with farming constituting the main economic activity within a water catchment management regime. The "planning strategy and land use policies" implemented by the Somerset Regional Council are therefore "directed this end".

The Somerset Regional Council, which administers the region, has an estimated operating budget of A$100 million. (according to Council's 2026-2027 budget adopted in June 2026). The Somerset region comprises the primary water catchments for the Somerset and Wivenhoe Dams that form an essential part of the water supply grid for South East Queensland.

In the 2021 census, the Somerset Region had a population of 25,057 people.

== History ==
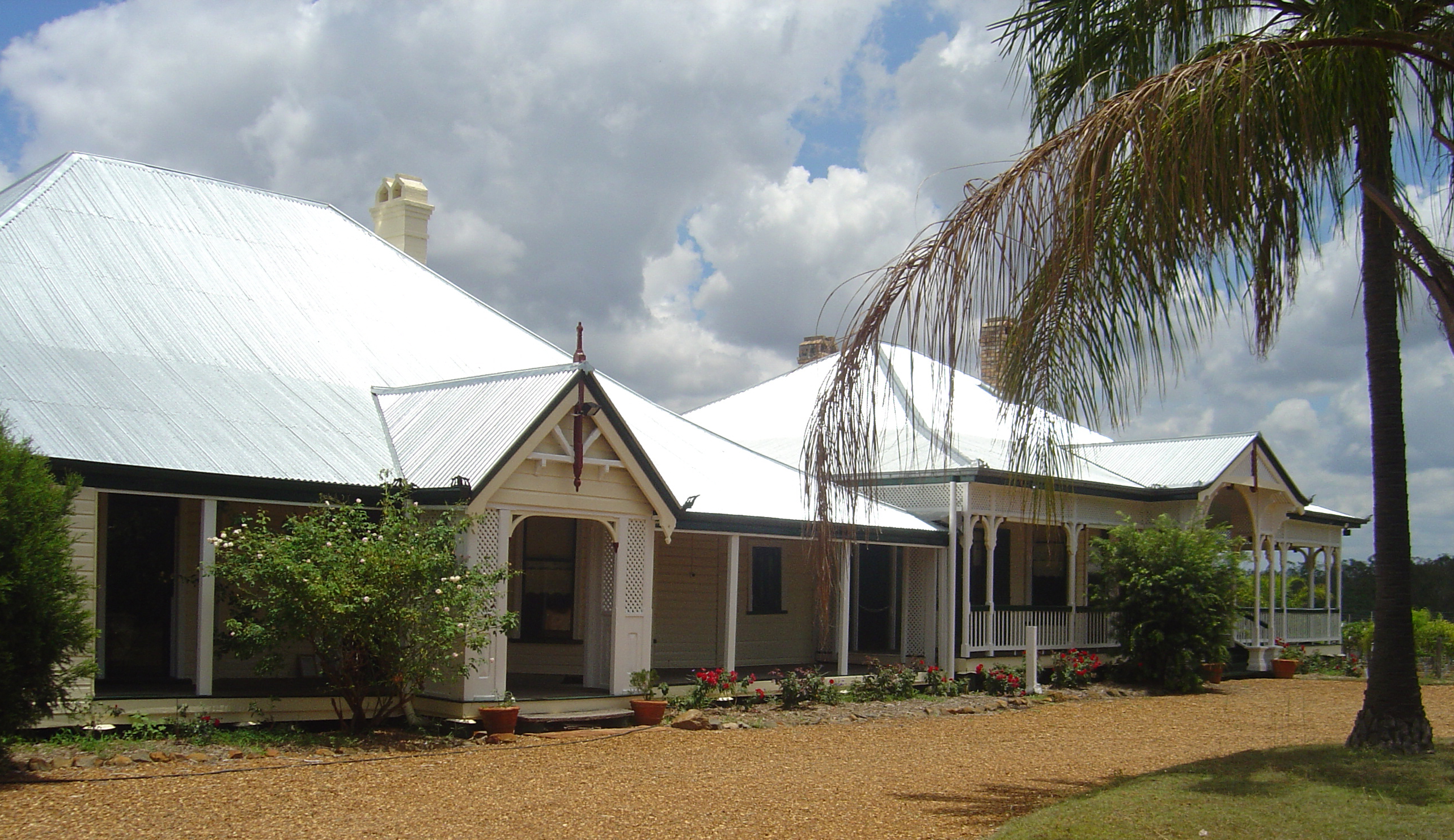
The earliest sections of Bellevue Homestead date from the 1870s.

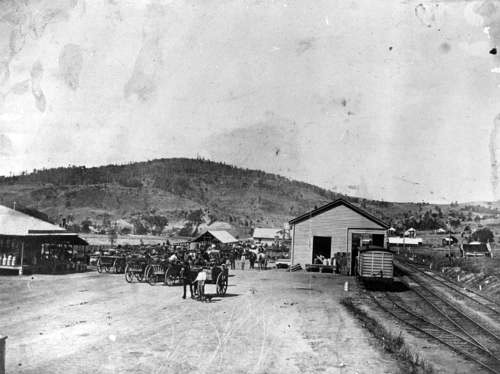
Horse-drawn wagons at the Lowood Railway Station with the Queensland Farmer's Co-Op. Ltd on the opposite side of the street.

Duungidjawu (Kabi Kabi, Cabbee, Carbi, Gabi Gabi) is an Australian Aboriginal language spoken on Duungidjawu country. The Duungidjawu language region includes the landscape within the local government boundaries of Somerset Region and the City of Moreton Bay, particularly the towns of Caboolture, Kilcoy, Woodford and Moore.

Garumngar (also known as Dalla, Garumga. See also Wakka Wakka related languages/dialects) is a language of the Upper Brisbane River catchment. The Garumngar language region includes the landscape within the local government boundaries of the Ipswich, Brisbane, Moreton Bay and Somerset, particularly the towns of Dayboro and Esk extending east towards Moggill.

Prior to 2008, the new Somerset Region was an entire area of two previous and distinct local government areas:

- the Shire of Esk;
- and the Shire of Kilcoy.

=== Indigenous history ===
The traditional owners of the Brisbane Valley district include the Jagera, Yuppera, Ugarapul and Dungibara people who occupied the region for thousands of years prior to European settlement.

Jagara (also known as Jagera, Yagara, Yugarabul, Yuggera and Yuggerabul) is one of the Aboriginal languages of South-East Queensland. There is some uncertainty over the status of Jagara as a language, dialect or perhaps a group or clan within the local government boundaries of Ipswich City Council, Lockyer Regional Council and the Somerset Regional Council.

The country of the Dungibara people started just south of Esk and ran north along the river where their boundary ended near the source of the Brisbane River. The name Dungibara is made up of two words; Dungi meaning wet, tear etc. and bara stipulating people of a place. During the drought seasons the Brisbane River became very dry and left mostly stagnant water pools, their main source of water was from the tributaries that ran into the river.

=== European exploration ===
The Somerset region in South East Queensland was originally settled by European pastoralists in the 1840s after the New South Wales Government had opened up the land around the penal colony at Moreton Bay. The pioneers of this region sought land along the Brisbane and Stanley Rivers for raising sheep. There were several exploration maps to guide them. John Oxley discovered the Brisbane River in December 1823 with a castaway John Finnegan as his guide who had been shipwrecked on Moreton Island and cared for by the indigenous peoples there. Oxley's recommendations lead to a penal colony being established at Redcliffe (1824) and Brisbane the following year. Before this penal colony was closed in 1839 Botanist and explorer Alan Cunningham had discovered Spicers Gap (1827) and Cunninghams Gap (1828) through the Great Dividing Range that would link the Darling Downs with Ipswich and Brisbane. He had also climbed Mount Esk, crossed Lockyer's Plains (later Cressbrook), named a unique bend in the Brisbane River near Wivenhoe "Pedal Bight" and climbed Lister's Peak situated two miles south east of Linville. John Gray had explored to Fernvale; Edmund Lockyer had mapped the junction of the Stanley and Brisbane rivers and Mount Brisbane in 1826 and by 1830 Captain Patrick Logan, Commandant of the penal colony of Moreton Bay had discovered the Logan River (1829), the Bremer River (1827) and explored the Brisbane and Stanley rivers and possibly Kilcoy Creek (1830). He is thought to have been killed by indigenous tribesmen near Wivenhoe on the Brisbane River on 18 October 1830.

=== Settlement ===
According to Henry Stuart Russell the early settlers of the Brisbane Valley followed in the footsteps of Walter & Patrick Leslie. They had "blazed a trail to the Darling Downs, marking the first tree at Wyndam's Stockyards, down the Severn River which they crossed near Texas and thence to the Condamine River between Tummaville and Ellangowan where, at Leslie's Crossing Place, the marked tree line ended." From the Downs the settlers crossed the Great Dividing Range at the new Gormans Gap, discovered by Owen Gorman and then followed Lockyer Creek to Tarampa and up the Brisbane and Stanley rivers to their headwaters. The first settlers on the eastern side of the Great Dividing Range as listed by Russell were "Cocky" Rogers with Mocatta's sheep at Grantham; Somerville at Tent Hill and Richard Jones at Helidon. Following these were Frederick and Francis Edward Bigge (Mt. Brisbane), Evan and Colin Mackenzie (Kilcoy), the McConnel Brothers (David and Frederic) at Cressbrook and the Balfour Brothers (John and Robert) at Colinton.

At the end of August 1843, the Anglican missionary John Gregor spent a fortnight in the Brisbane River valley visiting all the settlers at that time. He saw David Archer at Durundur and his guest Ludwig Leichhardt and then visited the superintendent of Kilcoy station, John Macdonald. He spoke with Frederick and Francis Bigge at Mt. Brisbane, Alexander and Gideon Scott at Mt. Esk (where they only ran cattle) and D.C. McConnel and his superintendent Henry Mort at Cressbrook. He stayed with John Balfour at Colinton, Graham and Ivory at Eskdale, Borthwick and Oliver at Buaraba and Wingate and Fletcher at Lockyer's Creek. From here he returned to Ipswich. Approaching Kilcoy station Gregor had noted "a number of the aborigines, who were very vociferous in their calls of "Name you," but did not attempt to deal us any blows. They were, however, all armed with shields, spears, waddies, and boomerangs". This was the only property "which [Gregor] wish[ed] to leave as soon as possible for several reasons". In 1842, race relations faltered after the deaths of up to 60 Aboriginals at Kilcoy station who were poisoned by flour which was laced with strychnine. Gregor's diary reference may have been his reaction to information about that atrocity. Baker's map of 1846 shows the relative positions of the pioneer families of the Somerset region around the Stanley and Brisbane Rivers. Cressbrook is the only property still managed by the pioneering McConnel family, and both the homestead and its Victoria chapel designed by Robin Dods are now on the Queensland Heritage Register.

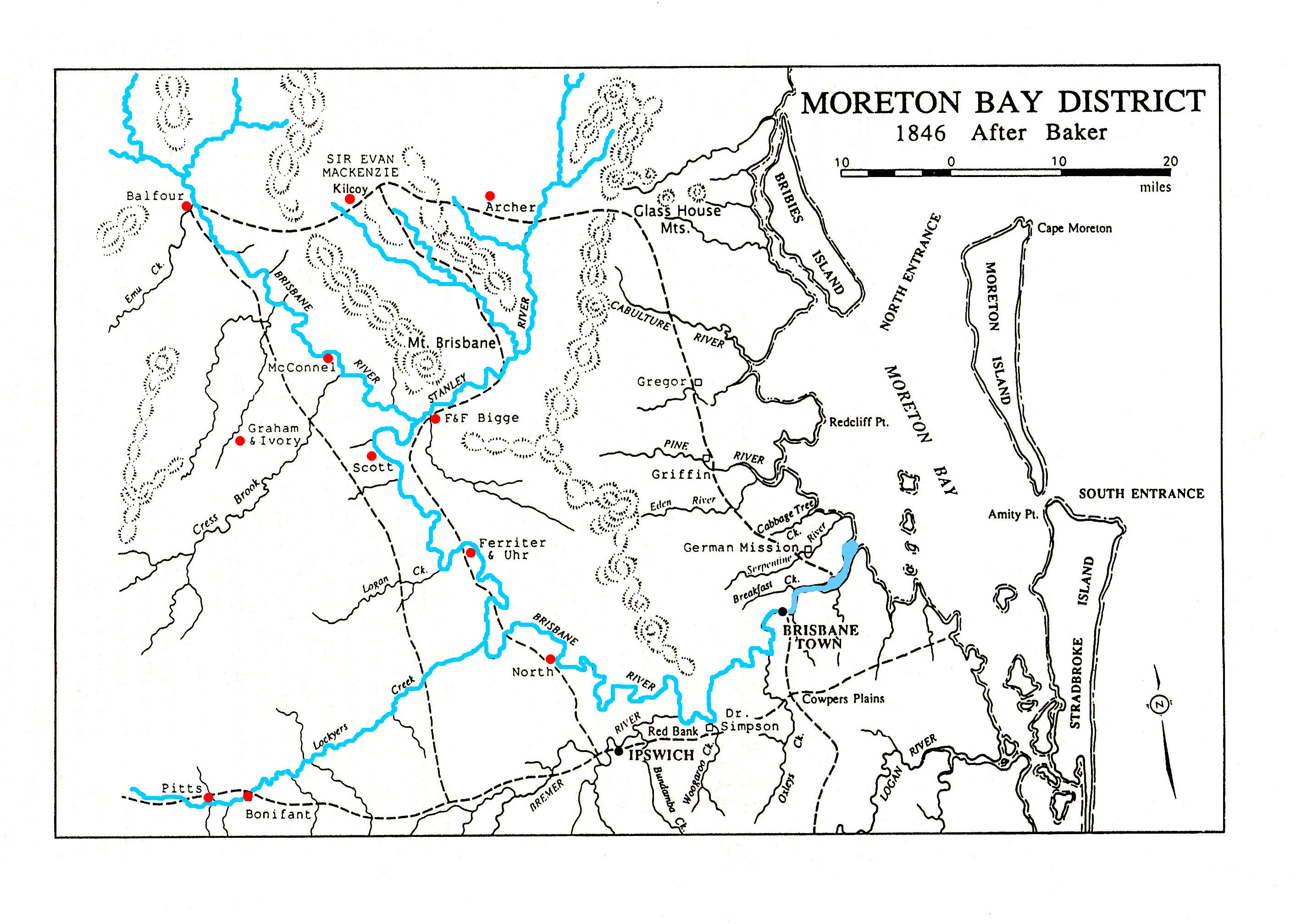
Baker's map of 1846 shows the relative positions of the pioneer families of the Somerset region around the Stanley and Brisbane Rivers.

Two other buildings associated with this early stage of the history of the Somerset region are still available to the public. One is the Bellevue Homestead that was built for the North family and was relocated during the building of the Wivenhoe Dam. The homestead is currently privately owned by John And Laurel Dingle and is open to public. The earliest sections of Bellevue Homestead date from the 1870s and it is now heritage listed and welcomes visitors. The other is a shepherd's slab hut from Colinton Station that has been relocated to the grounds of Ringsfield House, Nanango.

Other historical sites within the Somerset region representing closer settlement, railway development and a wide diversity of business and leisure interests include the Wivenhoe and Stanley Dams, St Andrews Anglican Church & Hall, Toogoolawah and St Agnes Church and Rectory, Esk. There are heritage listed war memorials at Esk and at Linville and a dental surgery at Lowood that was originally the Royal Bank of Queensland, the Fire Tower at Jimna, the Lockyer Creek Railway bridge at Clarendon, the Rail Bridge at Harlin, the Yimbun Railway Tunnel, and existing railway stations at Coominya, Lowood, Esk, Toogoolawah and Linville. The heritage listed Caboonbah homestead, built by H.P. Somerset, was destroyed by fire in 2009 but the public can still enjoy views of the Brisbane River from its precinct.

=== Local government ===
The Durundur Division was incorporated on 11 November 1879 under the Divisional Boards Act 1879. Its name was changed to Esk on 5 June 1880 by proclamation. With the passage of the Local Authorities Act 1902, Esk became a shire on 31 March 1903. The Shire of Kilcoy, historically part of the Caboolture Division and later the Shire of Caboolture, was proclaimed on 22 February 1912. In July 2007, the Local Government Reform Commission released its report and recommended that Esk and Kilcoy amalgamate. Both councils opposed the amalgamation. On 15 March 2008, the two Shires formally ceased to exist, and elections were held on the same day to elect six councillors and a mayor to the Regional Council.

== Climate ==
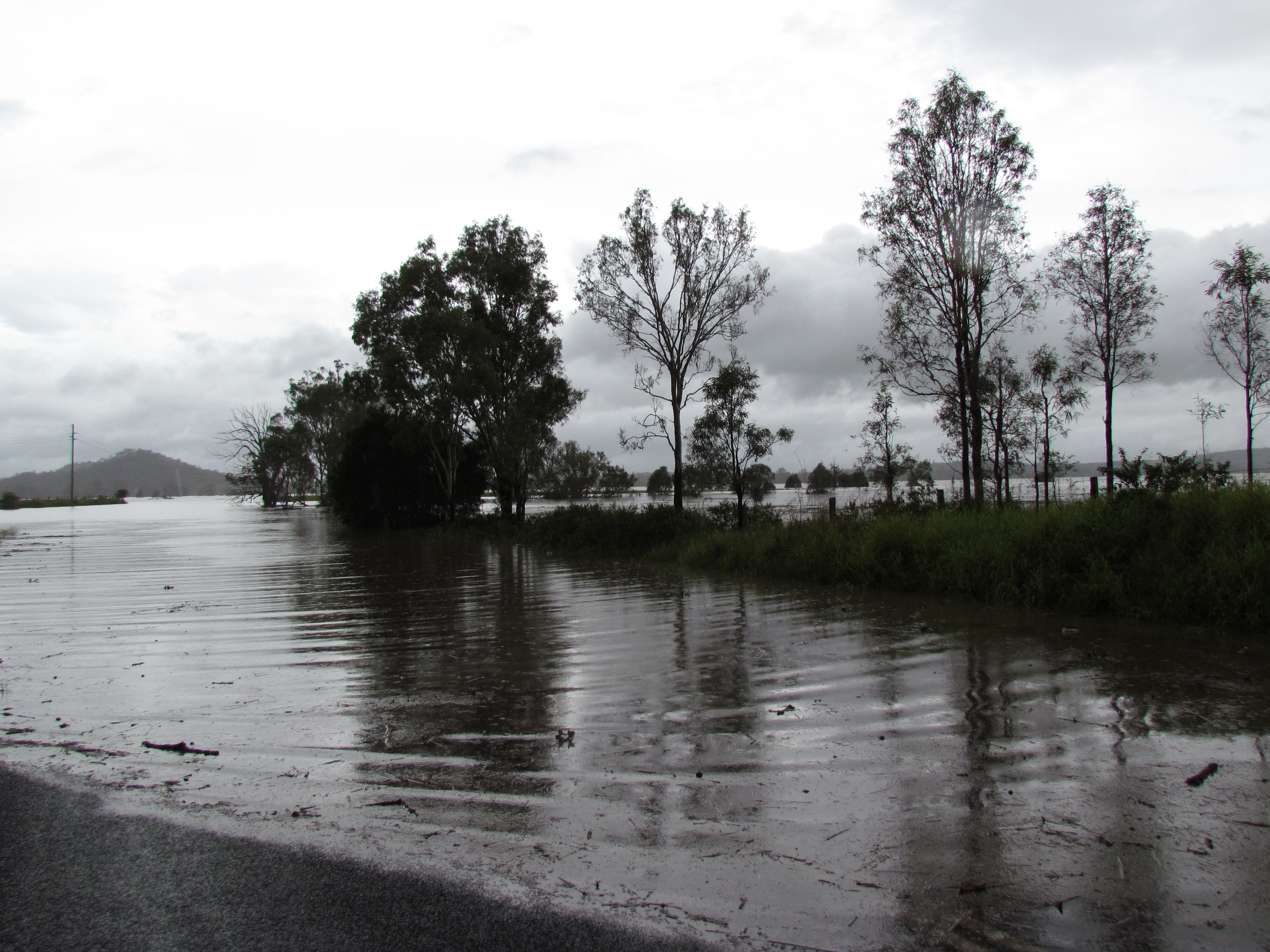
Brisbane Valley Highway Flooded for 5 km (3 mi) at Geof Fisher Bridge crossing during the 2010–2011 Queensland floods

The Somerset region experiences a humid subtropical climate (Köppen climate classification Cfa) with hot and humid summers and mild to warm winters with cool overnight temperatures.

Median monthly rain fall at the Esk Post Office in the centre of the Somerset region since records began in 1887 is 76.26 millimetres (3.002 in). The highest recorded annual rainfall was 2,166 millimetres (85.3 in) in 1893, the year of the 1893 Brisbane flood also known as the Black February floods. By contrast, the rainfall recorded for the year of the 2010–2011 Queensland floods in South East Queensland was 1,198.6 millimetres (47.19 in), but for the period January 2010 to January 2011, the total rainfall was 1,758.4 millimetres (69.23 in).

== Recreation ==
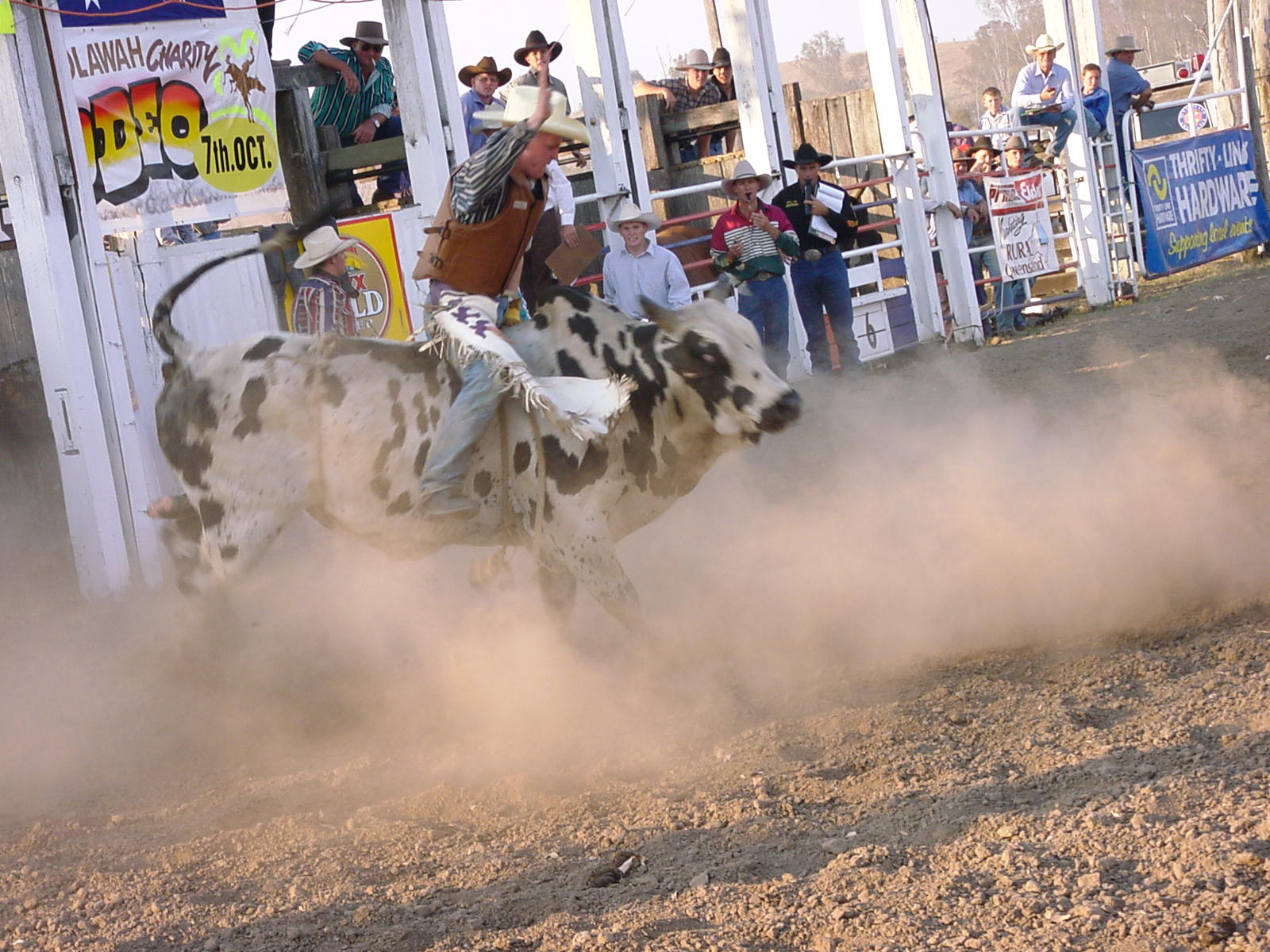
Bull Riding at Toogoolawah Show

Fishing, Horse riding (trail riding, camp drafting, rodeos), cycling, water-skiing, sky diving, walking, four wheel driving, flying (small aircraft), sailing and camping are popular recreational activities.

== Economy ==
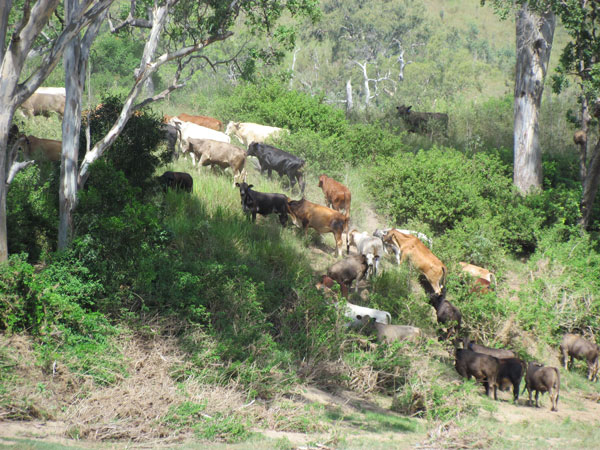
Cattle grazing in the Upper Brisbane Valley, north of Linville

The primary economic activity in the Somerset region is agricultural production (A$120.8 million in 2006). The region is also the location of two major water storage dams – Wivenhoe and Somerset. The Wivenhoe Power Station, is a 500-megawatt, pumped storage hydroelectric plant located on the eastern side of Wivenhoe Dam. Tourism makes a significant contribution to the local economy as Somerset region is just one hour's drive from Brisbane and the Somerset and Wivenhoe Dams offer facilities for a range of water based recreational activities. The largest employers in the region apart from the Somerset Regional Council are the abattoir operated by the Greenmountain Trading Co and the meat processing plant operated by Australian Food Corporation Pty. Limited, which processes meat patties for McDonald's. The Australian Bureau of Statistics ranked the Somerset region as having the third fastest-growing population by local government area in the state (2.94%, narrowly ahead of Ipswich's 2.93%) for the June 2010 – June 2011 period. The smoothed unemployment rate for the Somerset Region in the December quarter of 2011 was 4.4%.

== Telecommunications ==
ADSL Broadband is available in all the major population centres and there is mobile phone/3G mobile Broadband coverage in most parts of the Somerset region with some notable blackspots, especially in the north of the region and around Somerset Dam. NBN (interim) satellite Broadband is available in all locations where other forms of Broadband are not available. The Somerset region is not currently included in the NBN Co three-year roll-out plan for fibre optic cable, but it is included in the NBN Co two-year roll-out plan for fixed wireless Broadband. New greenfield developments in excess of 100 lots will be connected to NBN fibre optic as required by the Federal Government.

== Council ==
Somerset Regional Council is unsubdivided and its elected body consists of six councillors and a popularly elected mayor, elected for a four-year term. A deputy mayor is also appointed by council for a four-year term.

=== Current composition ===
The current council, elected in 2024, is:

Position	Councillor	Party
Mayor	Jason Wendt	Independent
Councillor	Helen Brieschke	Independent
Councillor	Michael Bishop	Independent Labor
Councillor	Brett Freese	Independent
Councillor	Stephanie Laycock	Independent
Councillor	Tiara Hurley	Independent
Councillor	Sally Jess	Independent

== Mayors ==
=== 2008–present ===
No.	Portrait	Mayor	Party	Term start	Term end
1		Graeme Lehmann	Independent	15 March 2008	16 March 2024
1		Jason Wendt	Independent	16 March 2024	Incumbent

=== Deputy mayors ===
No.	Portrait	Mayor	Party	Term start	Term end	Mayor
1		Neil Zabel	Independent	2008	6 December 2012 †	Lehmann (Independent)
2		Dan Hall	Independent	2012	2020	Lehmann (Independent)
3		Helen Brieschke	Independent	2020	incumbent	Lehmann (Independent)

== Past councillors ==
=== 2008−present ===
Year	Councillor	Party	Councillor	Party	Councillor	Party	Councillor	Party	Councillor	Party	Councillor	Party
2008	Alan "Dozer" Bechly	Independent	Robin Caddy	Independent	Dan Hall	Independent	Noel Kammholz	Independent	Bruce Pearce	Independent	Neil Zabel †	Independent
2012	Helen Brieschke	Independent	Jim Madden	Independent Labor	Dan Hall	Independent	Kirsten Moriarty	Independent	Michael "Otis" Ogg	Independent	Neil Zabel †	Independent
2012	Helen Brieschke	Independent	Jim Madden	Independent Labor	Dan Hall	Independent	Kirsten Moriarty	Independent	Michael "Otis" Ogg	Independent	Alan "Dozer" Bechly	Independent
2015	Helen Brieschke	Independent	Bob Whalley	Independent	Dan Hall	Independent	Kirsten Moriarty	Independent	Michael "Otis" Ogg	Independent	Alan "Dozer" Bechly	Independent
2016	Helen Brieschke	Independent	Bob Whalley	Independent	Dan Hall	Independent	Sean Choat	Independent LNP	Michael "Otis" Ogg	Independent	Cheryl Gaedtke	Independent
2020	Helen Brieschke	Independent	Bob Whalley	Independent	Kylee Isidro	Independent	Sean Choat	Independent LNP	Jason Wendt	Independent	Cheryl Gaedtke	Independent

== Towns and localities ==
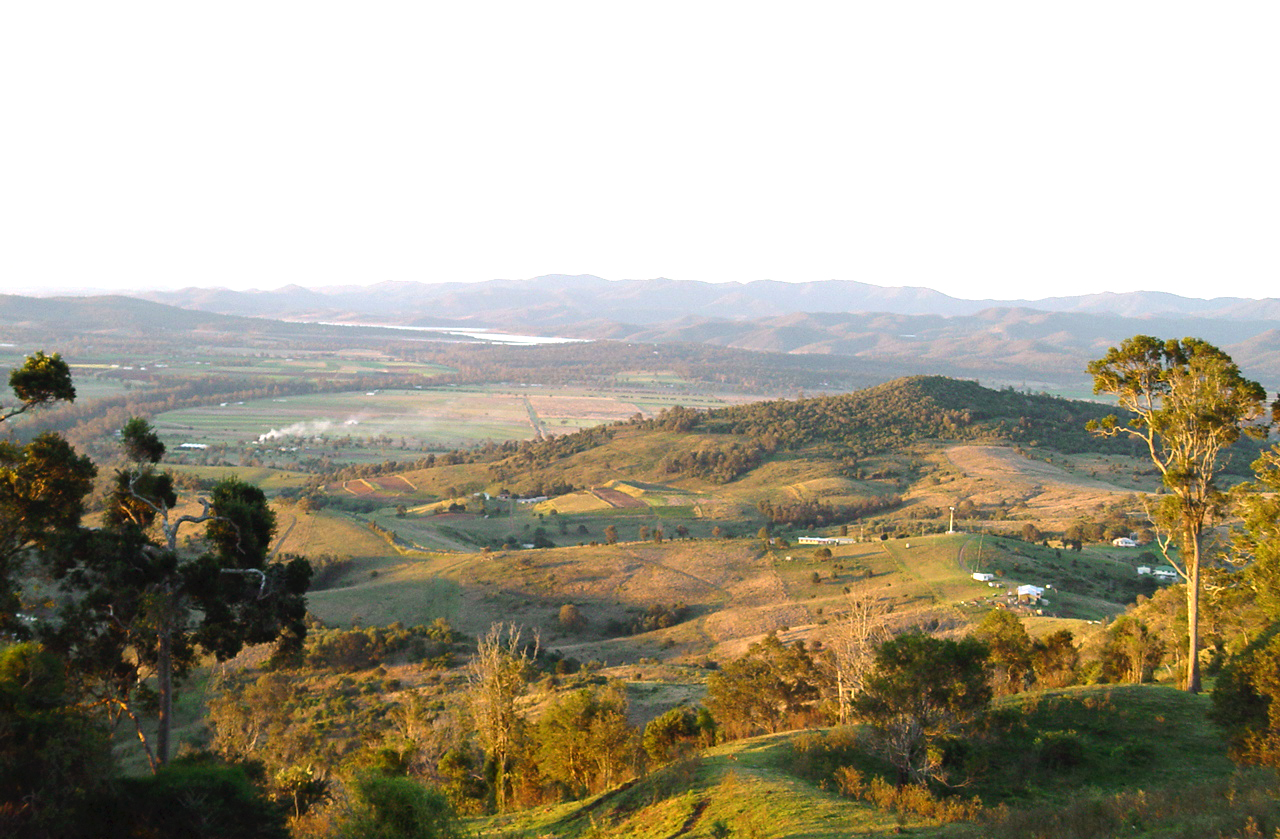
View across farmland towards Wivenhoe Dam from Mount Stradbroke

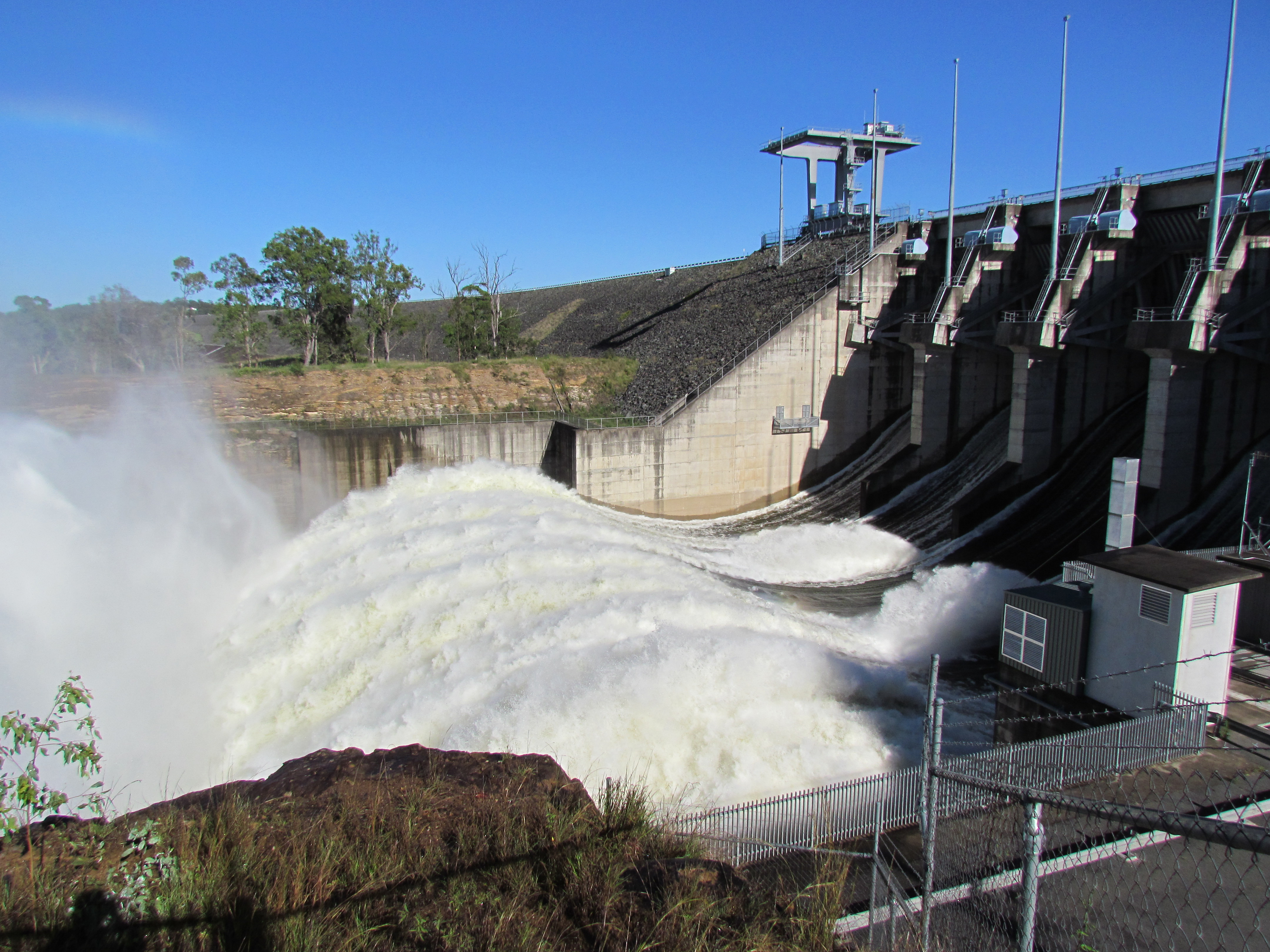
Wivenhoe Dam water release in 2010

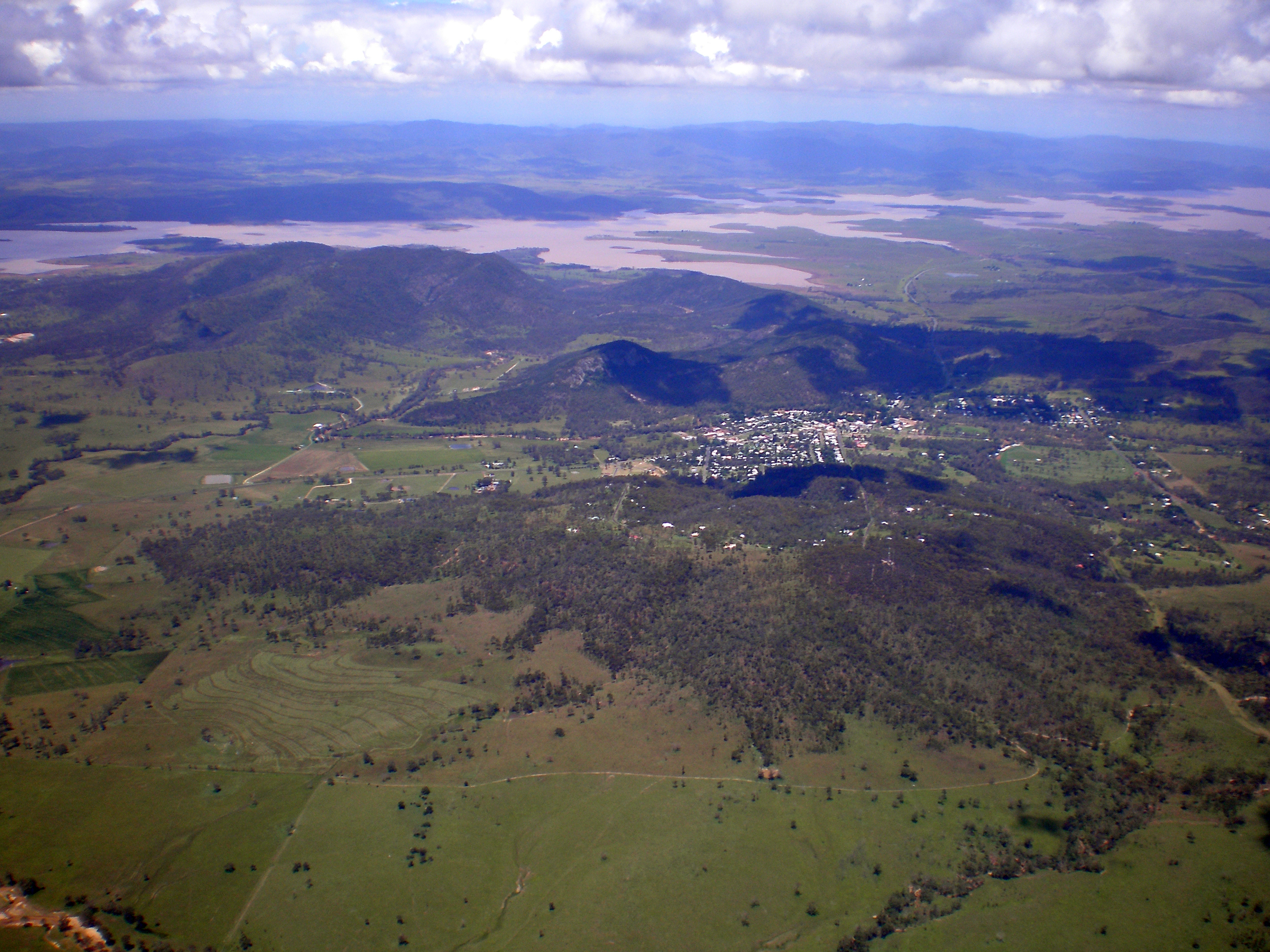
Aerial view of Esk and flooded Wivenhoe Dam, 2011

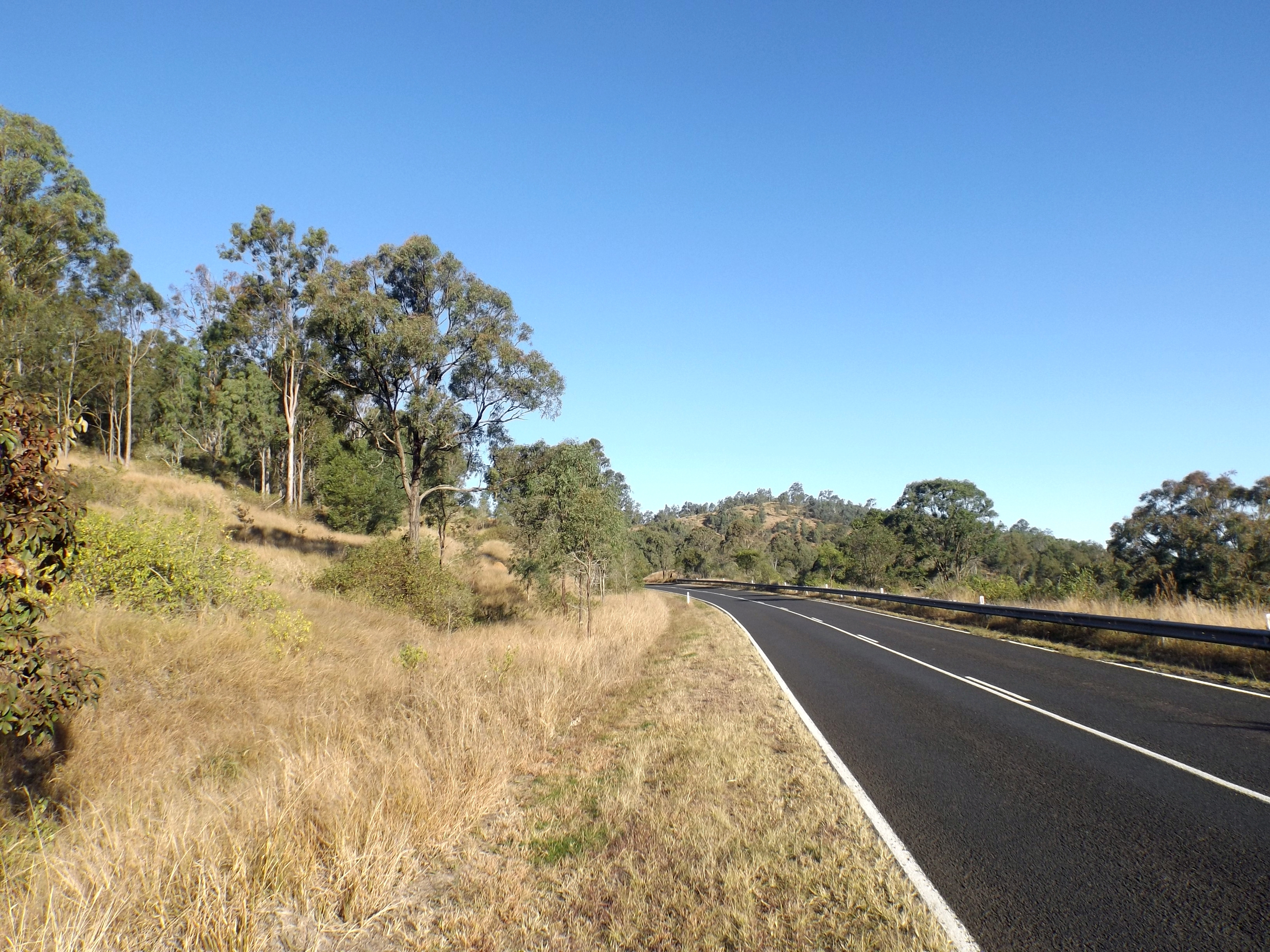
Wivenhoe Somerset Dam Road at Bryden, 2015

The Somerset Region includes the following settlements:

Kilcoy area:

- Kilcoy
- Glenfern
- Hazeldean
- Jimna
- Monsildale
- Villeneuve
- Winya
- Yabba
- Yendina

Esk area:

- Esk
- Borallon
- Caboonbah
- Clarendon
- Colinton
- Coolana
- Coominya
- Dundas
- Fairney View
- Fernvale
- Glamorgan Vale
- Harlin
- Lake Somerset
- Lake Wivenhoe
- Lark Hill
- Linville
- Lowood
- Minden
- Moore
- Mount Hallen
- Mount Tarampa
- Prenzlau
- Rifle Range
- Tarampa
- Toogoolawah
- Vernor
- Wanora

Other areas:

- Atkinsons Dam
- Avoca Vale
- Banks Creek (Note: Locality is split with the City of Brisbane.)
- Biarra
- Braemore
- Brightview (Note: Locality is split with Lockyer Valley Region.)
- Bryden
- Buaraba
- Coal Creek
- Cooeeimbardi
- Cressbrook
- Crossdale
- England Creek
- Eskdale
- Fulham
- Glen Esk
- Gregors Creek
- Haigslea
- Ivory Creek
- Kingaham
- Lake Manchester
- Lockrose
- Lower Cressbrook
- Marburg
- Moombra
- Mount Archer
- Mount Beppo
- Mount Byron
- Mount Kilcoy
- Mount Stanley
- Murrumba
- Ottaba
- Patrick Estate
- Redbank Creek
- Royston
- Sandy Creek
- Scrub Creek
- Sheep Station Creek
- Somerset Dam
- Split Yard Creek
- Westvale
- Wivenhoe Hill
- Wivenhoe Pocket
- Woolmar
- Yimbun

Notes

Also in the region are Lake Somerset and the Yabba State Forest.

== Demographics ==
The populations given relate to the component entities prior to 2008. The most recent census in 2011 was the first for the new Region.

Year	Population (Region total)	Population (Esk)	Population (Kilcoy)	Notes
1921	10,156	7,925	2,231	
1933	9,874	7,654	2,220	
1947	9,688	7,137	2,551	
1954	9,458	6,985	2,473	
1961	8,836	6,430	2,406	
1966	8,463	6,120	2,343	
1971	7,728	5,579	2,149	
1976	8,193	5,970	2,223	
1981	10,276	8,090	2,186	
1986	11,686	9,109	2,577	
1991	13,928	10,977	2,951	
1996	16,530	13,391	3,139	
2001	17,273	14,029	3,244	
2006	18,426	15,002	3,424	
2011 census	21,639			
2016 census	24,597			
2021 census	25,057			

== Libraries ==
The Somerset Regional Council operate public libraries at Esk, Kilcoy, Lowood, and Toogoolawah.

== Notable residents ==
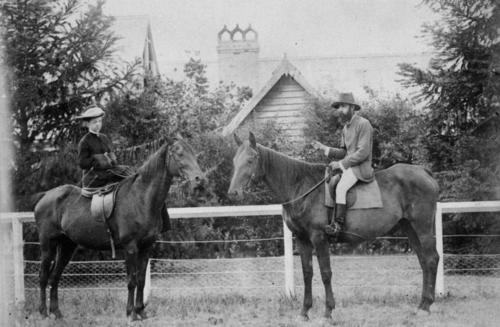
Henry Plantagenet Somerset with his wife Katharine Rose McConnel at Cressbrook Stati

- Troy Cassar-Daley – multi-award-winning country musician.
- Hon Bill Hayden – former Member for Oxley, former Federal Government Minister and former Governor General of Australia
- Craig Lowndes – multi-championship winning Australian racing drive
- Henry Plantagenet Somerset (1852–1936) – landowner who attempted to warn Brisbane of the 1893 Brisbane flood
- Clive Palmer owns 3 properties in the Somerset region and deployed his helicopter to assist local residents who were stranded on rooftops during the 2011 Queensland Floods
- Kevin James Ryan – Dual international Rugby Union–Rugby League, Queensland Amateur Heavyweight Boxing Champion, ABC TV Commentator, Mayor of Hurstville, Barrister
