= Yimbun, Queensland =

Yimbun
- Suburb
- Interactive map of Yimbun
- Coordinates: 27.0316°S 152.3594°E
- Country: Australia
- State: Queensland
- LGA: Somerset Region
- Location: 8.1 km (5.0 mi) N of Toogoolawah; 25.6 km (15.9 mi) N of Esk; 89.7 km (55.7 mi) NNW of Ipswich; 124 km (77 mi) NW of Brisbane

Government
  - State electorate: Nanango
  - Federal division: Blair

Area
  - Total: 7.6 km^{2} (2.9 sq mi)

Population
  - Total: 30 (2021 census)
  - Density: 3.9/km^{2} (10.2/sq mi)
- Time zone: UTC+10:00 (AEST)
- Postcode: 4313
Suburbs around Yimbun
Harlin	Harlin	Gregors Creek
Ivory Creek	Yimbun	Braemore
Ivory Creek	Ivory Creek	Braemore

Yimbun is a rural locality in the Somerset Region, Queensland, Australia. In the 2021 census, Yimbun had a population of 30 people.

== Geography ==
The Brisbane Valley Highway passes through the north-eastern part of the locality, entering from the east (Braemore) and exiting to the north (Harlin).

The Brisbane Valley Rail Trail (the former Brisbane Valley railway line) enters the locality from the south (Ivory Creek) and exits to the north-east (Gregors Creek).

The land use is grazing on native vegetation to the west of the highway and rural residential housing to the east of the highway.

== History ==
Yimbun takes its name from the Yimbun railway station, a word from the Dunibara dialect of the Waka language meaning bullrush (Typha angustifolia). It was briefly named Moorabool from 1904 to 1906 and then Kannangur from 1906 to 1914.

The fourth sector of the Brisbane Valley railway line opened from Toogoolawah to Yimbun on 1 September 1904, with Yimbun being served by the Yimbun railway station. The railway line closed in 1993. The conversion of the line into the Brisbane Valley Rail Trail was proposed in 1996 with the first section opened in 2003. The final section from Toogoolawah to Moore (via Yimbun) was completed on 7 August 2018. At 161 kilometres (100 mi), the rail trail is the longest in Australia.

== Demographics ==
In the 2016 census, Yimbun had a population of 33 people.

In the 2021 census, Yimbun had a population of 30 people.

== Education ==
There are no schools in Yimbun. The nearest government primary schools are Harlin State School in neighbouring Harlin to the north and Toogoolawah State School in Toogoolawah to the south. The nearest government secondary school is Toogoolawah State High School, also in Toogoolawah.
