= The Bluff, Queensland (Toowoomba Region) =

The Bluff
- Suburb
- Interactive map of The Bluff
- Coordinates: 27.1969°S 152.1433°E
- Country: Australia
- State: Queensland
- LGA: Toowoomba Region
- Location: 13.7 km (8.5 mi) NE of Crows Nest; 33.9 km (21.1 mi) SW of Toogoolawah; 45.2 km (28.1 mi) NE of Highfields; 62.1 km (38.6 mi) NNE of Toowoomba CBD; 142 km (88 mi) NW of Brisbane

Government
  - State electorate: Nanango
  - Federal division: Maranoa

Area
  - Total: 32.5 km^{2} (12.5 sq mi)

Population
  - Total: 0 (2021 census)
  - Density: 0.000/km^{2} (0.00/sq mi)
- Time zone: UTC+10:00 (AEST)
- Postcode: 4355
Suburbs around The Bluff
Anduramba	Anduramba	Eskdale
Anduramba	The Bluff	Eskdale
Crows Nest	Cressbrook Creek	Cressbrook Creek

The Bluff is a rural locality in the Toowoomba Region, Queensland, Australia. In the 2021 census, The Bluff had "no people or a very low population".

== Demographics ==
In the 2016 census, The Bluff had "no people or a very low population".

In the 2021 census, The Bluff had "no people or a very low population".

== Education ==
There are no schools in The Bluff. The nearest government primary school is Crow's Nest State School in Crows Nest to the south-west. The nearest government secondary schools are Crows' Nest State School (to Year 10), Toogoolawah State High School in Toogoolawah to the north-east, and Highfields State Secondary College in Highfields to the south-west.
