= Harlin =

- Town
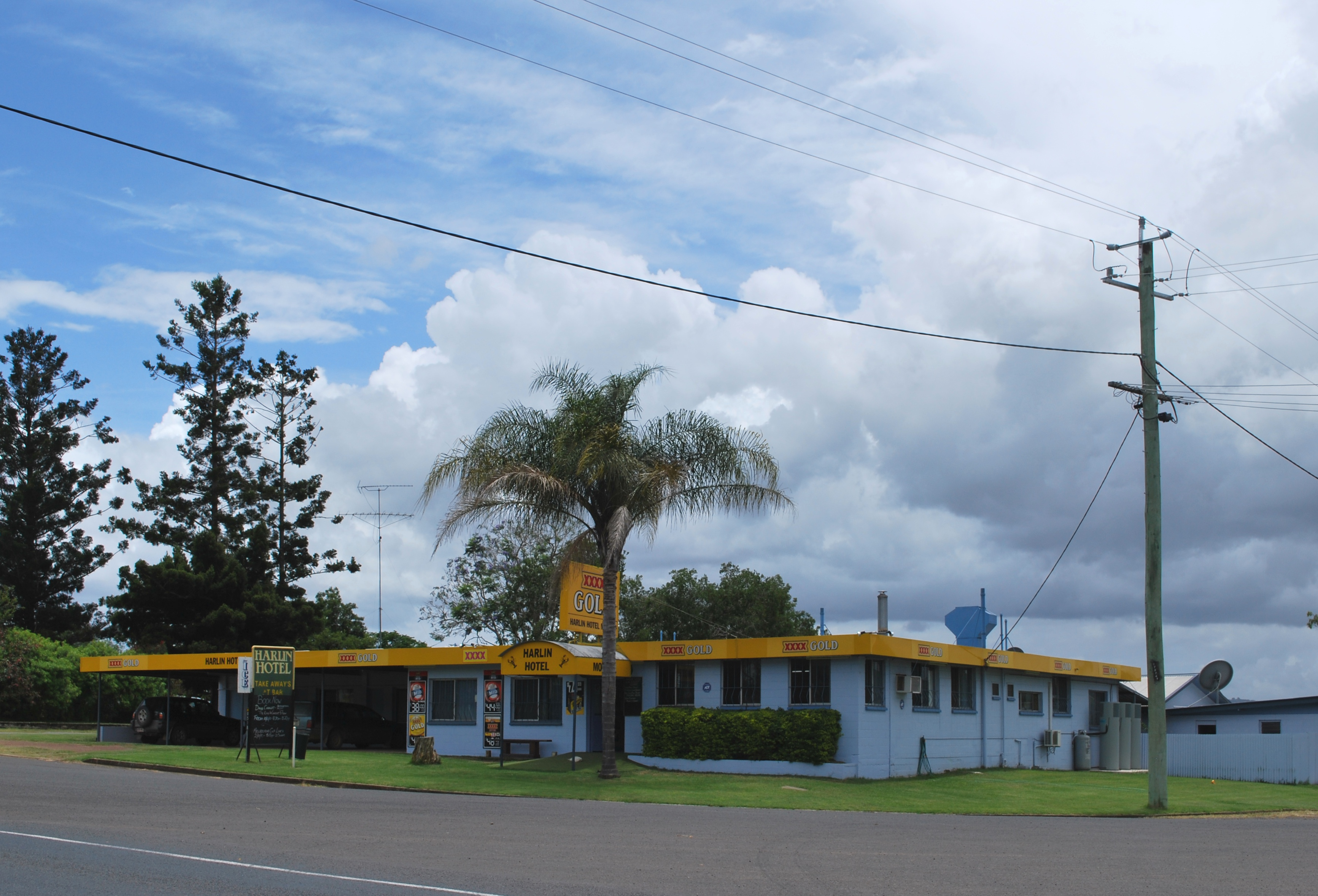
- Harlin Hotel

- Interactive map of Harlin
- Coordinates: 26.9730°S 152.3566°E
- Country: Australia
- State: Queensland
- LGA: Somerset Region
- Location: 14.0 km (8.7 mi) N of Toogoolawah; 27.2 km (16.9 mi) W of Kilcoy; 31.5 km (19.6 mi) N of Esk; 95.5 km (59.3 mi) NNW of Ipswich; 125 km (78 mi) NW of Brisbane CBD

Government
  - State electorate: Nanango
  - Federal division: Blair

Area
  - Total: 255.7 km^{2} (98.7 sq mi)

Population
  - Total: 211 (2021 census)
  - Density: 0.8252/km^{2} (2.137/sq mi)
- Time zone: UTC+10:00 (AEST)
- Postcode: 4314
- County: Cavendish
- Parish: Colinton
Localities around Harlin
Moore	Sheep Station Creek	Woolmar
Colinton	Harlin	Gregors Creek; Yimbun
Anduramba	Eskdale	Ivory Creek

Harlin is a rural town and locality in the Somerset Region, Queensland, Australia. In the 2021 census the locality of Harlin had a population of 211 people.

== Geography ==
Harlin is a small town in South East Queensland. The town is on the Brisbane Valley Highway and the Brisbane River, 125 kilometres (78 mi) north-west of the state capital, Brisbane.

== History ==
The town was named after Charlotte (née Harlin), wife of John Dunn Moore of the Colinton pastoral property. Their son William John Harlin Moore was a Member of the Queensland Legislative Assembly.

Harlin Post Office opened by September 1907 (a receiving office had been open from 1905) and closed in 1989.

Harlin Provisional School opened in 1908. On 1 January 1909, it became Harlin State School.

The town was marooned during the 2011 floods. Over 40 travellers were stranded by the dangerous and rising flood waters of the Brisbane River and the Ivory and Maronghi Creeks. They were housed by the publicans and owners of the Harlin Hotel and the Caltex service station from 9 January 2011, until the flooded creeks and rivers subsided.

== Demographics ==
In the 2011 census, Harlin and the surrounding areas had a population of 534 people.

In the 2016 census, the locality of Harlin had a population of 173 people.

In the 2021 census, the locality of Harlin had a population of 211 people.

== Heritage listings ==
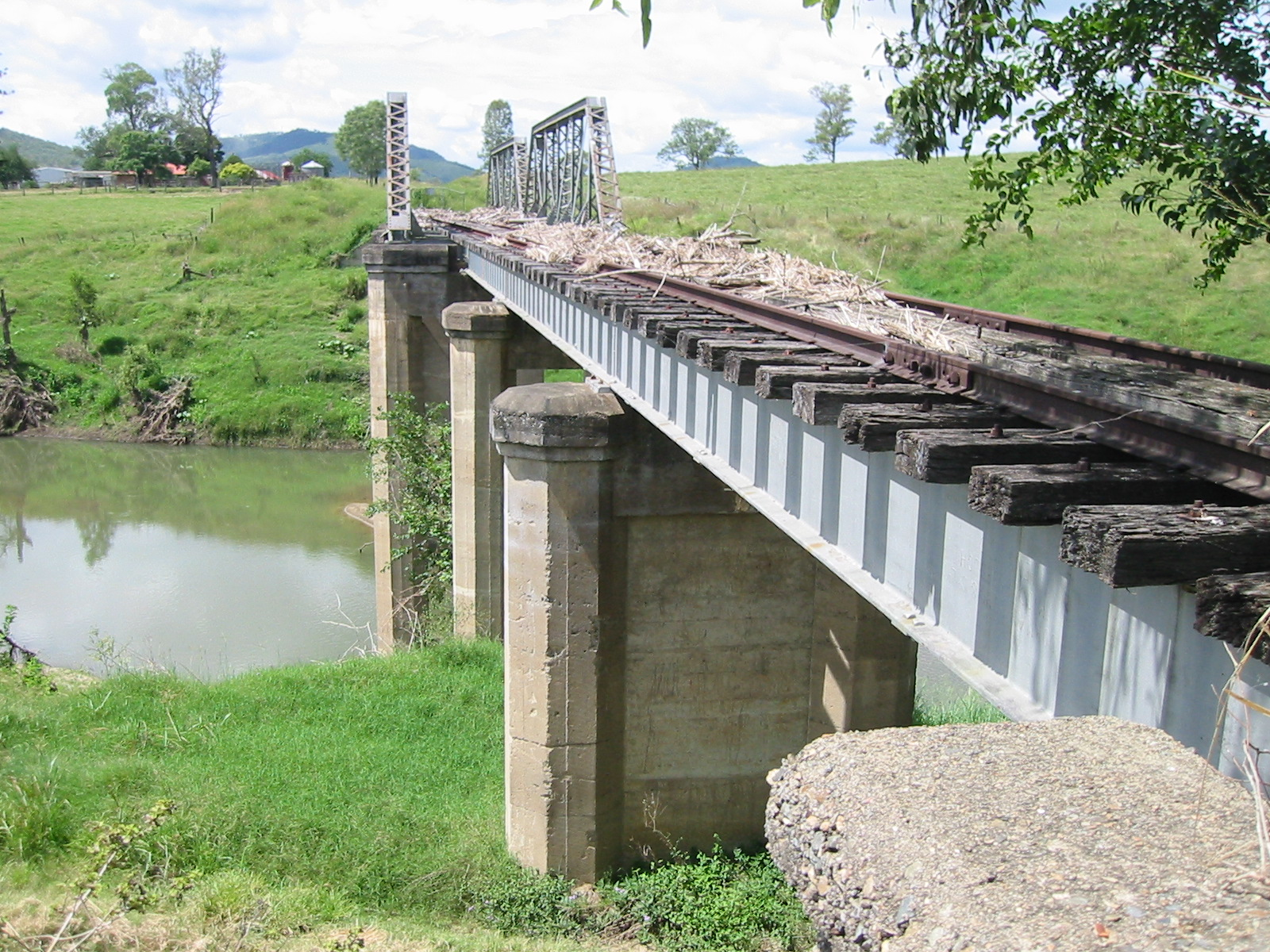
Harlin Rail Bridge

Harlin has a number of heritage-listed sites, including:

- Harlin Rail Bridge, over Ivory (formerly Maronghi) Creek
- Yimbun Railway Tunnel, Sinnamons Lane

== Education ==
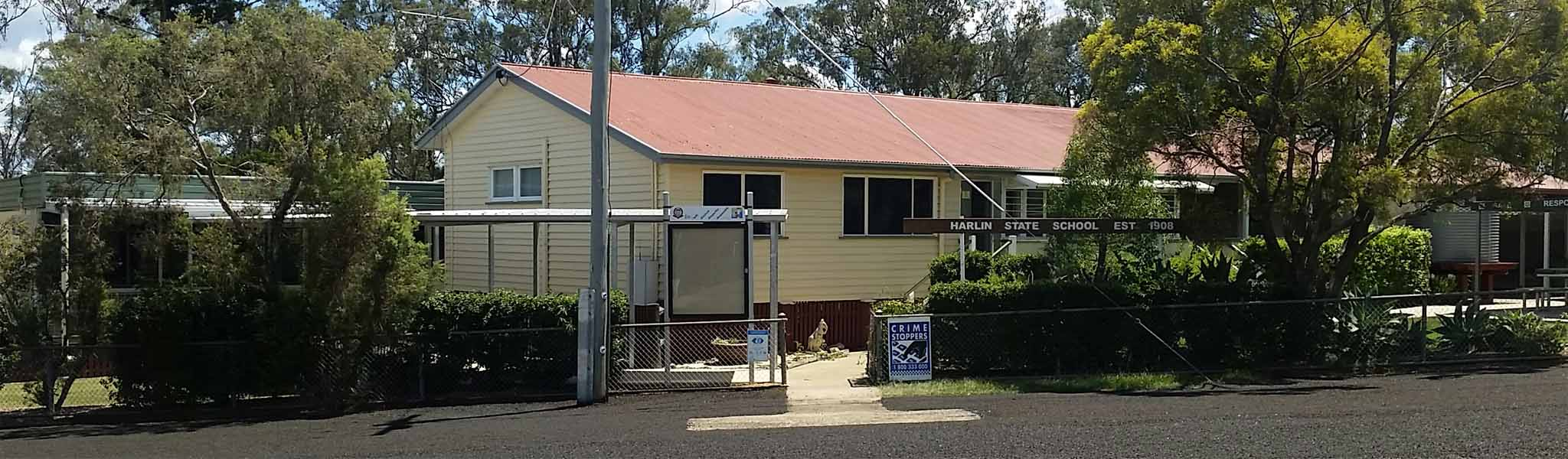
Harlin State School, 2020

Harlin State School is a government primary (Prep–6) school for boys and girls at 8521 Brisbane Valley Highway (26.9740°S 152.3574°E). In 2017, the school had an enrolment of 65 students with 5 teachers (4 full-time equivalent) and 5 non-teaching staff (3 full-time equivalent). In 2018, the school had an enrolment of 58 students with 6 teachers (4 full-time equivalent) and 4 non-teaching staff (2 full-time equivalent).

There are no secondary schools in Harlin. The nearest government secondary schools are Kilcoy State High School in Kilcoy to the east and Toogoolawah State High School in Toogoolawah to the south. However, students living in the west of Harlin are too distant to attend these secondary schools; the alternatives are distance education and boarding school.
