= Split Yard Creek, Queensland =

Split Yard Creek
- Suburb
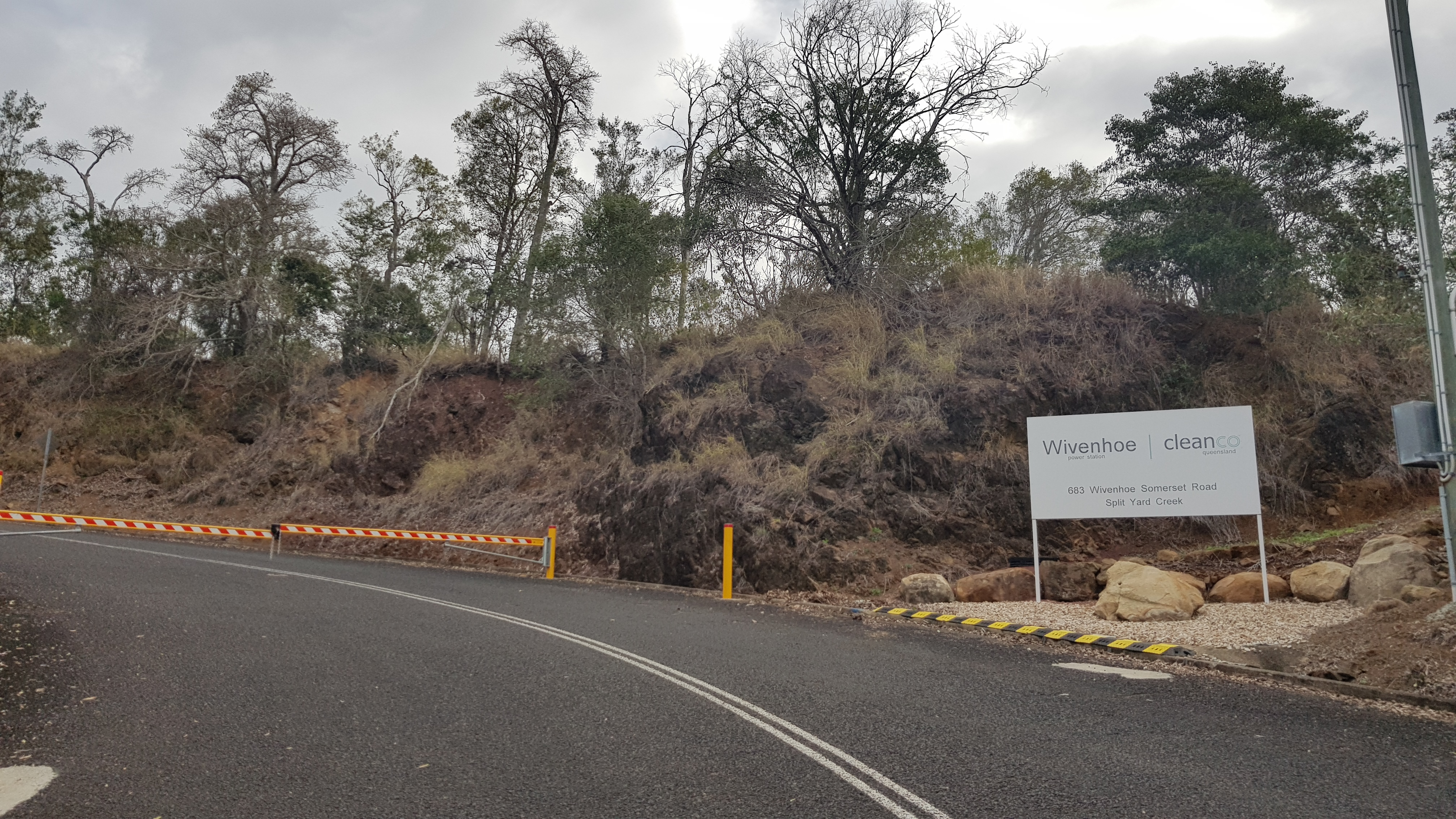
- Wivenhoe Power Station entry, 2023

- Interactive map of Split Yard Creek
- Coordinates: 27.3733°S 152.6594°E
- Country: Australia
- State: Queensland
- LGA: Somerset Region
- Location: 9.6 km (6.0 mi) N of Fernvale; 15.8 km (9.8 mi) NE of Lowood; 34.1 km (21.2 mi) NNW of Ipswich CBD; 38.5 km (23.9 mi) SE of Esk; 70.2 km (43.6 mi) WNW of Brisbane

Government
  - State electorate: Nanango
  - Federal division: Blair

Area
  - Total: 23.0 km^{2} (8.9 sq mi)

Population
  - Total: 31 (2021 census)
  - Density: 1.348/km^{2} (3.49/sq mi)
- Time zone: UTC+10:00 (AEST)
- Postcode: 4306
Suburbs around Split Yard Creek
Lake Wivenhoe	Dundas	Dundas
Lake Wivenhoe	Split Yard Creek	England Creek
Lake Wivenhoe	Wivenhoe Pocket	England Creek

Split Yard Creek is a rural locality in the Somerset Region, Queensland, Australia. In the 2021 census, Split Yard Creek had a population of 31 people.

== Geography ==
The locality is triangular in shape, wide at the north and narrow at the south. Lake Wivenhoe, impounded by the Wivenhoe Dam, loosely forms the western boundary, noting that the extent of the lake varies with the amount of water held by the dam.

The Wivenhoe Somerset Road enters the locality from the south (Wivenhoe Pocket), forms part of the southern boundary of the locality and then heads north-west through the locality running parallel and east of Lake Wivenhoe north-western corner of the locality where it exits to Dundas.

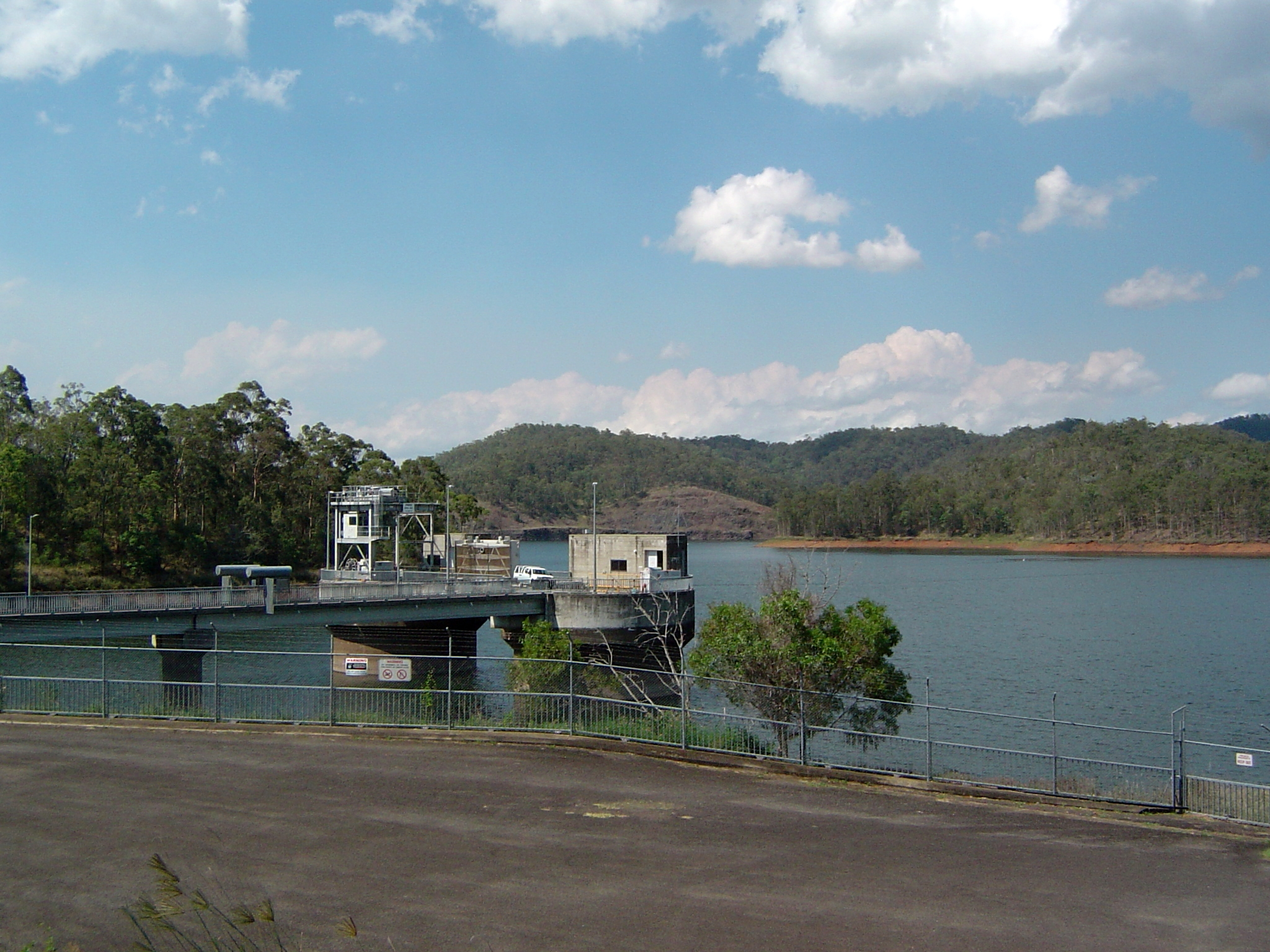
Splityard Creek Dam, 2012

Splityard Creek Dam is to the immediate east of the Wivenhoe Somerset Road (27.3691°S 152.6394°E). It provides water for the pumped-storage hydroelectric Wivenhoe Power Station located between the higher-level Splityard Creek Dam and the lower-level Wivenhoe Dam (27.37222°S 152.63194°E).

The locality of Split Yard Creek has the following mountains:

- Hernandia Hill in the north-west of the locality (27.3690°S 152.6333°E), rising to 213 metres (699 ft) above sea level
- Mount England (also known as Mount Sampson) on the south-eastern boundary of the locality with England Creek (27.3962°S 152.6560°E), 307 metres (1,007 ft)
- Mount Baxter in the south of the locality (27.4065°S 152.6523°E), 225 metres (738 ft)

The D'Aguilar National Park is in the north of the locality extending into neighbouring Dundas to the north and beyond. Apart from this protected area, the land use is predominantly grazing on native vegetation with some rural residential housing.

== History ==
The locality presumably takes its name from the watercourse Split Yard Creek which flows through the locality (27.38768°S 152.65128°E).

== Demographics ==
In the 2016 census, Split Yard Creek had a population of 37 people.

In the 2021 census, Split Yard Creek had a population of 31 people.

== Education ==
There are no schools in Split Yard Creek. The nearest government primary school is Fernvale State School in Fernvale to the south. The nearest government secondary school is Lowood State High School in Lowood to the south-west.

== Attractions ==
There is a public carpark with access to the Splityard Creek Lookout at the Splityard Creek Dam.
