= Wivenhoe (disambiguation) =

Wivenhoe is a town in England.

Wivenhoe may also refer to:

== Australia ==
- Wivenhoe Pocket, a rural district in the Somerset Region of Queensland (sometimes simply known as Wivenhoe)
  - Lake Wivenhoe, a lake in Queensland formed by Wivehoe Dam on the Brisbane River
  - Wivenhoe Dam, the dam on the Brisbane River, Queensland that creates Lake Wivenhoe
  - Wivenhoe Power Station, situated on Lake Wivenhoe
- Wivenhoe, Narellan, historic house in New South Wales
- Wivenhoe, Tasmania, a locality in Tasmania

== Canada ==
- Wivenhoe station (Manitoba), a railway station in Wivenhoe, Manitoba

== United Kingdom ==
- Wivenhoe railway station, on the Colchester to Clacton Line
- Wivenhoe Park, located in Colchester, East of England
- Wivenhoe Town F.C., a football club from Wivenhoe, Essex, England
