= Fulham, Queensland =

Fulham
- Suburb
- Interactive map of Fulham
- Coordinates: 27.0399°S 152.4761°E
- Country: Australia
- State: Queensland
- LGA: Somerset Region
- Location: 13.1 km (8.1 mi) NE of Toogoolawah; 26.7 km (16.6 mi) N of Esk; 90.8 km (56.4 mi) N of Ipswich; 107 km (66 mi) NW of Brisbane

Government
  - State electorate: Nanango
  - Federal division: Blair

Area
  - Total: 48.1 km^{2} (18.6 sq mi)

Population
  - Total: 53 (2021 census)
  - Density: 1.102/km^{2} (2.854/sq mi)
- Time zone: UTC+10:00 (AEST)
- Postcode: 4313
Suburbs around Fulham
Scrub Creek	Gregors Creek	Hazeldean
Scrub Creek	Fulham	Hazeldean
Cressbrook	Lower Cressbrook	Cooeeimbardi

Fulham is a rural locality in the Somerset Region, Queensland, Australia. In the 2021 census, Fulham had a population of 53 people.

== Geography ==
The Deer Reserve State Forest (27.0006°S 152.4947°E) is in the north of the locality. The state forest is 2,894 hectares (7,150 acres) and extends into the neighbouring localities of Gregors Creek to the north and Hazeldean to the north-east.

The Deer Reserve National Park (27.0811°S 152.526°E) is in the east of the locality. The national park is 3,228 hectares (7,980 acres) and extends into the neighbouring localities of Hazeldean to the east, Cooeeimbardi to the south-east and Somerset Dam (the locality) further to the south-east.

== History ==
Cressbrook Lower State School opened on 11 April 1916 and closed in 1953. It was at 2 Monks Road (corner Cooeeimbardi Road, 27.05595°S 152.45333°E).

Fulham State School opened in 1920 and closed circa 1953. It was located at 372 Cressbrook Caboonbah Road (southern corner with Fulham Road, 27.0771°S 152.4209°E, now in Cressbrook).

== Demographics ==
In the 2016 census, Fulham had a population of 35 people.

In the 2021 census, Fulham had a population of 53 people.

== Education ==
There are no schools in Fulham. The nearest government primary school is Toogoolawah State School in Toogoolawah to the south-west. The nearest government secondary schools are Toogoolawah State High School, also in Toogoolawah, and Kilcoy State High School in Kilcoy to the north-east.
