= England Creek =

Rural locality split between the City of Brisbane and Somerset Region

- Suburb
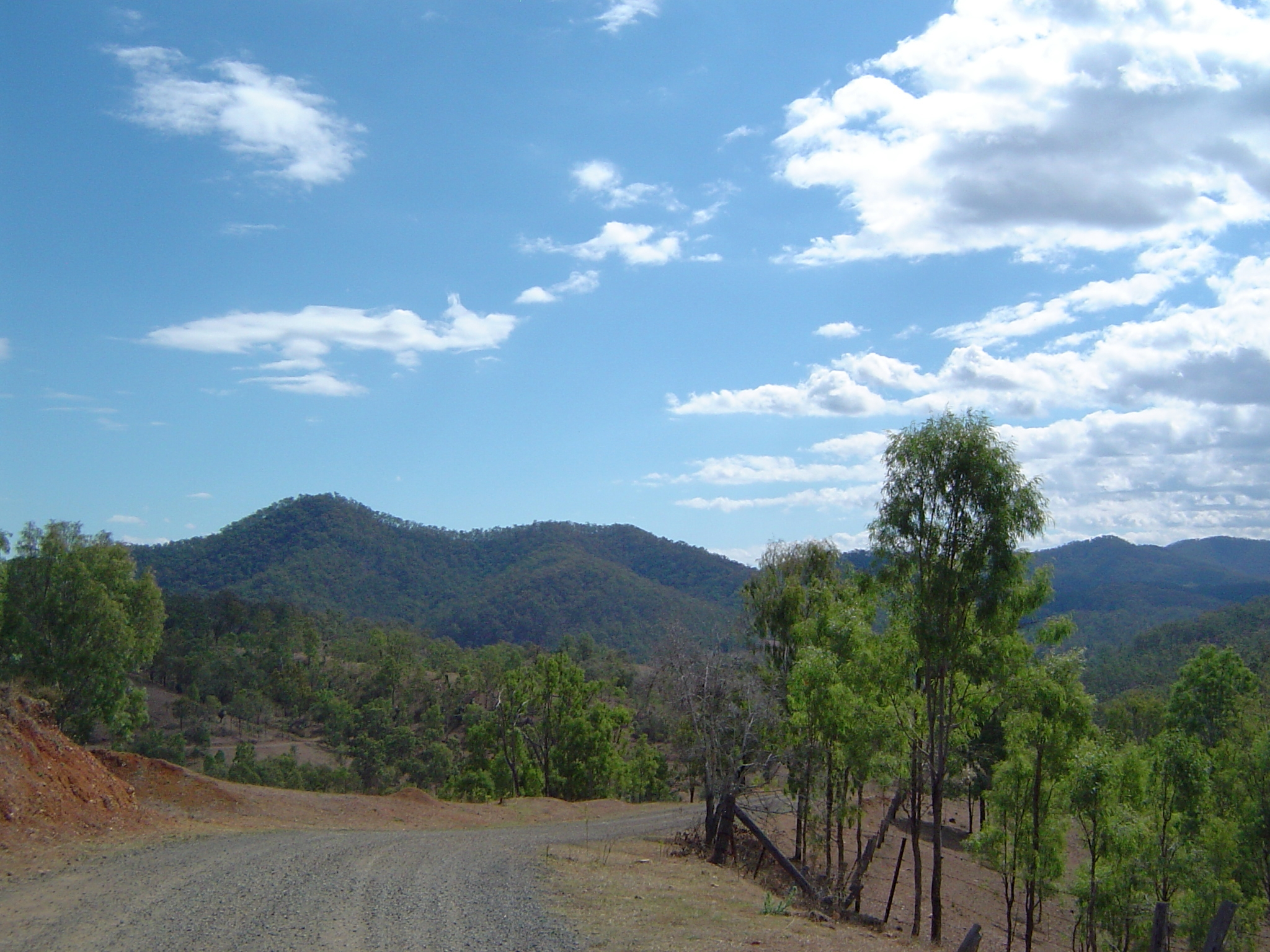
- View north east from England Creek Road, 2014

- Interactive map of England Creek
- Coordinates: 27.3561°S 152.7214°E
- Country: Australia
- State: Queensland
- LGAs: Somerset Region; City of Brisbane
- Location: 7.3 km (4.5 mi) NNE of Fernvale; 46.9 km (29.1 mi) SE of Esk; 68.3 km (42.4 mi) W of Brisbane CBD

Government
  - State electorates: Moggill; Nanango
  - Federal divisions: Blair; Ryan

Area
  - Total: 58.1 km^{2} (22.4 sq mi)

Population
  - Total: 39 (2021 census)
  - Density: 0.671/km^{2} (1.739/sq mi)
- Time zone: UTC+10:00 (AEST)
- Postcode: 4306
Suburbs around England Creek
Dundas	Dundas	Mount Glorious
Split Yard Creek	England Creek	Mount Nebo; Banks Creek
Wivenhoe Pocket	Fernvale	Banks Creek

England Creek is a rural locality split between Somerset Region and City of Brisbane, Queensland, Australia. In the 2021 census, England Creek had a population of 39 people.

== Geography ==
The locality lies a short distance south-east of Lake Wivenhoe.

England Creek (the watercourse) forms part of the eastern boundary before flowing through to the Brisbane River.

The Brisbane Valley Highway and the Wivenhoe Somerset Road (State Route 31) pass to the south-west, while the Mount Nebo Road (also part of State Route 32) runs along the north-eastern boundary. The main route through the locality is England Creek Road, which enters from the Brisbane Valley Highway.

== History ==
The locality presumably takes its name from the creek.

== Demographics ==
In the 2016 census, England Creek had a population of 33 people.

In the 2021 census, England Creek had a population of 39 people.

== Education ==
There are no schools in England Creek. The nearest government primary schools are Mount Nebo State School in neighbouring Mount Nebo to the south-east and Fernvale State School in neighbouring Fernvale to the south-west. The nearest government secondary schools are Lowood State High School in Lowood to the south-west and Ferny Grove State High School in Ferny Grove to the south-west.
