= Somerset Dam, Queensland =

Somerset Dam
- Town
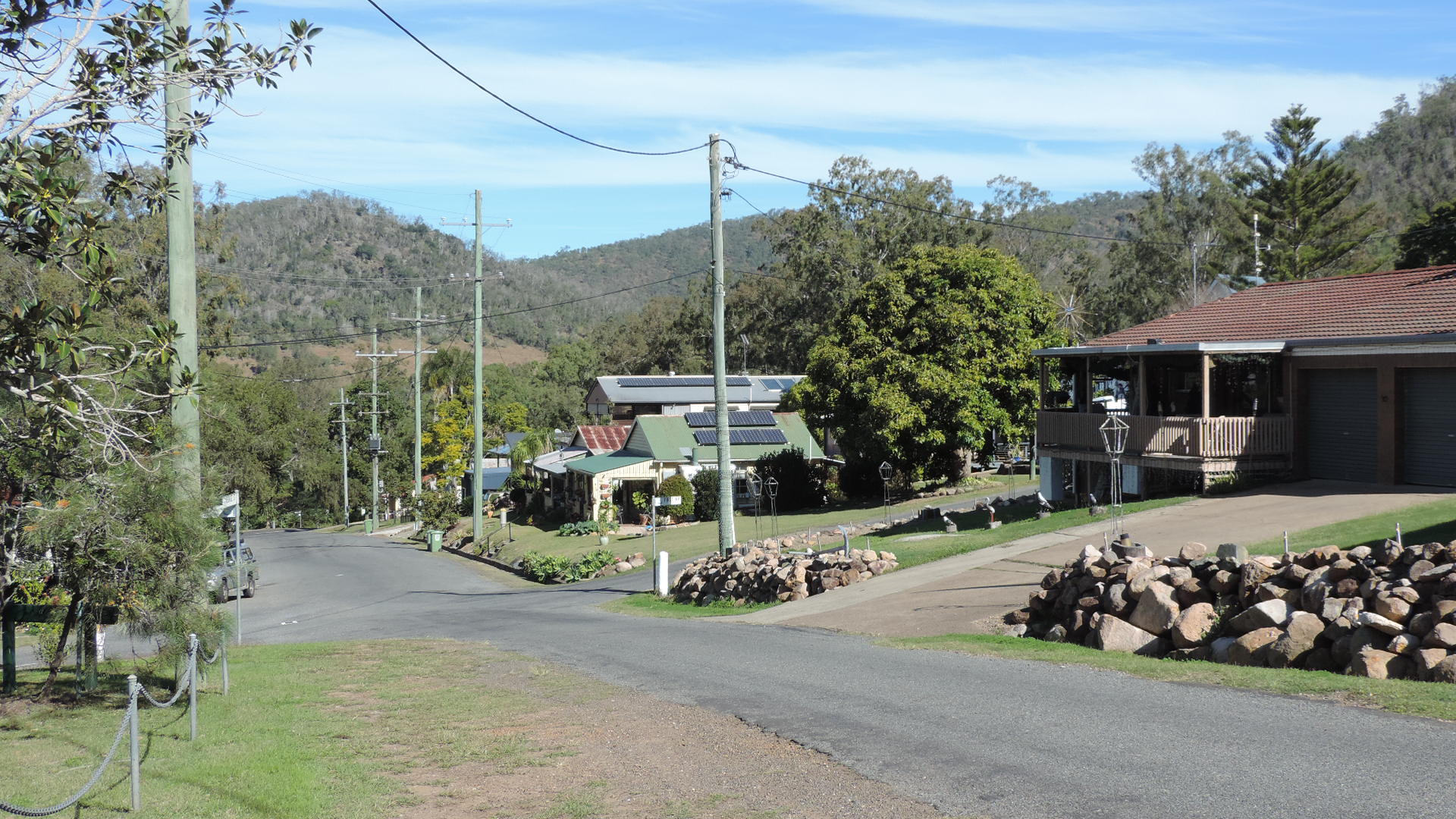
- Streetscape in Somerset Dam, 2020

- Interactive map of Somerset Dam
- Coordinates: 27.1172°S 152.5513°E
- Country: Australia
- State: Queensland
- LGA: Somerset Region
- Location: 25.7 km (16.0 mi) NE of Esk; 71.5 km (44.4 mi) N of Ipswich; 92 km (57 mi) NW of Brisbane

Government
  - State electorate: Nanango
  - Federal division: Blair

Area
  - Total: 21.8 km^{2} (8.4 sq mi)

Population
  - Total: 78 (2021 census)
  - Density: 3.578/km^{2} (9.27/sq mi)
- Time zone: UTC+10:00 (AEST)
- Postcode: 4312
Localities around Somerset Dam
Cooeeimbardi	Hazeldean	Crossdale
Cooeeimbardi	Somerset Dam	Lake Wivenhoe
Lake Wivenhoe	Lake Wivenhoe	Lake Wivenhoe

Somerset Dam is a rural town and locality in the Somerset Region, Queensland, Australia. When first being planned, it was unofficially known as the Stanley River township. In the 2021 census, the locality of Somerset Dam had a population of 78 people.

== Geography ==
The town lies on the slopes of Mount Brisbane (27.0886°S 152.5272°E) on the western bank of the Stanley River immediately below and south-west of the wall of the Somerset Dam (27.1154°S 152.5565°E) which impounds the river creating Lake Somerset (27.0333°S 152.5667°E).

The Deer Reserve National Park (27.0811°S 152.526°E) is in the north-west of the locality. The national park is 3,228 hectares (7,980 acres) and extends into the neighbouring localities of Hazeldean to the north, Cooeeimbardi to the north-west and Fulham further to the north-west.

== History ==
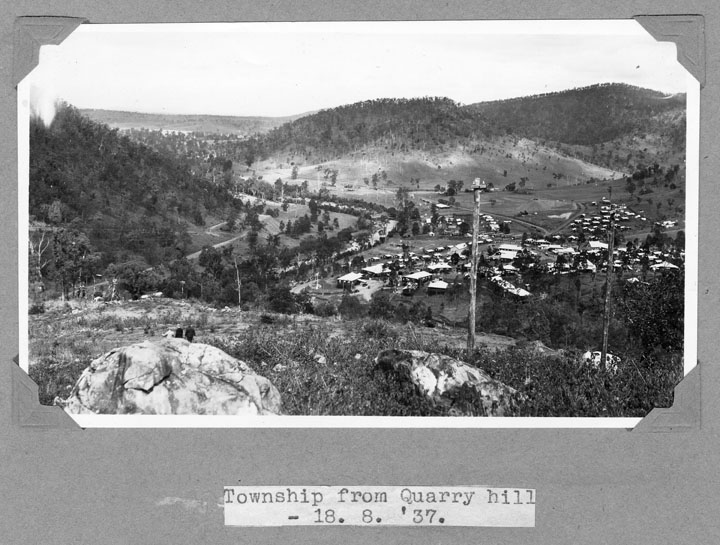
Stanley River Township from Quarry Hill, 1937

The town was constructed in 1935 to provide accommodation for those working on the construction of the dam and their families with the first businesses opening in 1936. The town was designed by civil engineer Charles Bank Mott like a suburban with gravel streets, electricity, street lights, reticulated water, stormwater drainage, and sewerage. Mott was seconded for three years from the Brisbane City Council.

When the project commenced, the town was informally known as the Stanley River township. The Queensland Government decided to call the town Somerset after local pastoralist Henry Plantagenet Somerset, the Member of the Queensland Legislative Assembly for Stanley from 1904 to 1920. However, the postal authorities objected, fearing confusion with Somerset in Far North Queensland and Somerset in Tasmania. In January 1936 it was officially named Somerset Dam after the dam, which was named after Henry Plantagenet Somerset.

As there was already a Somerset State School near Kilcoy (which had opened in 1915), the education authorities had decided to call the town's school Silverton. Silverton Provisional School opened in February 1936 at the end of First Avenue (27.1178°S 152.5505°E). In 1958, it became Silverton State School. Circa 1959, it was renamed Somerset State School (the school of that name near Kilcoy having closed in 1943). On 24 January 1966, it renamed Somerset Dam State School. It closed on 31 December 2000.

A community hall was officially opened on Wednesday 22 July 1936. It was constructed by the Stanley River Works Board (who were responsible for the construction of the dam) and could seat 200 people. It could be used as a dance hall and had projection facilities to be used as a cinema. Initially opened as Somerset Hall, by 1938 it had become known as Coronation Hall (presumably in honour of the Coronation of King George VI in 1937).

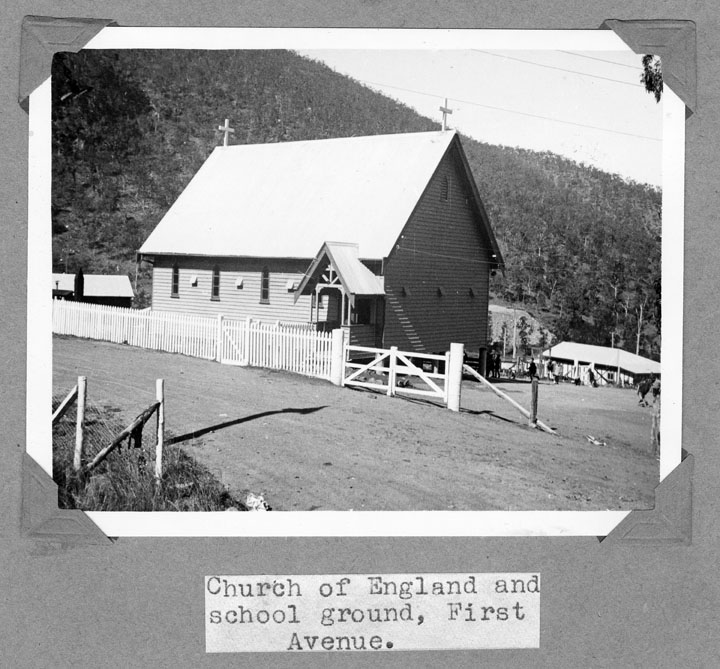
St Mark's Anglican Church, circa 1936

The dam was being built as part of a program of providing employment during the Great Depression. During World War II construction of the dam was halted to enable the workers to be redeployed on war-related work, such as the Cairncross Dockyard with work resuming in 1948. About 450 people were employed constructing the dam during which time the population of the town exceeded 1000 people.

St Mark's Anglican Church at First Avenue (27.1177°S 152.5508°E) was dedicated on 30 August 1936 by Archbishop William Wand. The church building was the former St Mark's Anglican Church of Fernvale which, having closed in 1934, was purchased by the Queensland Government for £50, relocated to Somerset Dam, renovated and re-roofed. The church closed circa 1995. As at 2020, the church building still exists but has been converted to holiday accommodation.

On the same day and at the same time as the Anglican church was dedicated, so too was St Joseph's Catholic Church at 5 King Street (27.1187°S 152.5510°E). It was blessed and dedicated by Archbishop James Duhig.

== Demographics ==
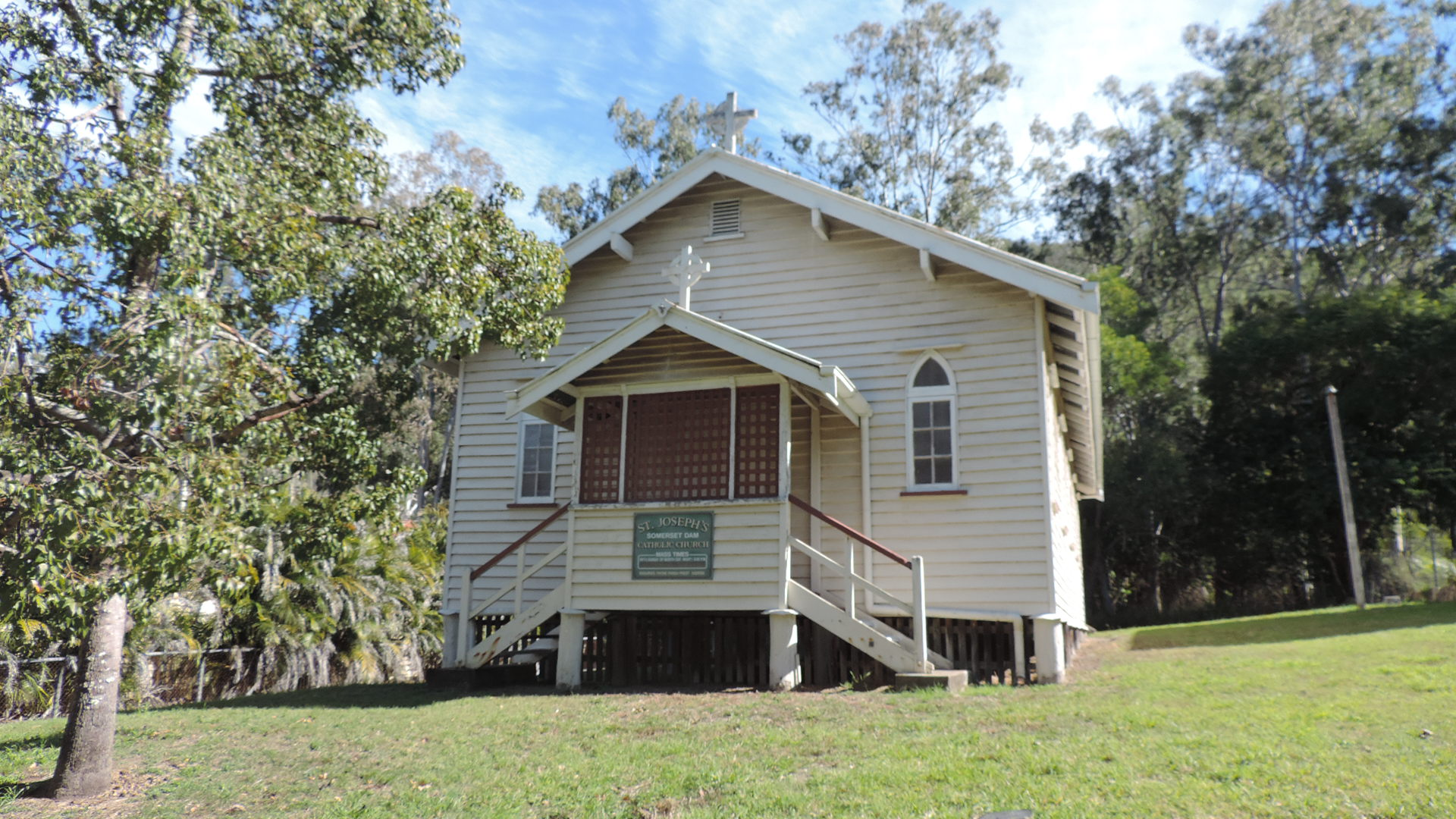
St Joseph's Catholic Church, 2020

In the 2016 census, the locality of Somerset Dam had a population of 69 people.

In the 2021 census, the locality of Somerset Dam had a population of 78 people.

== Education ==
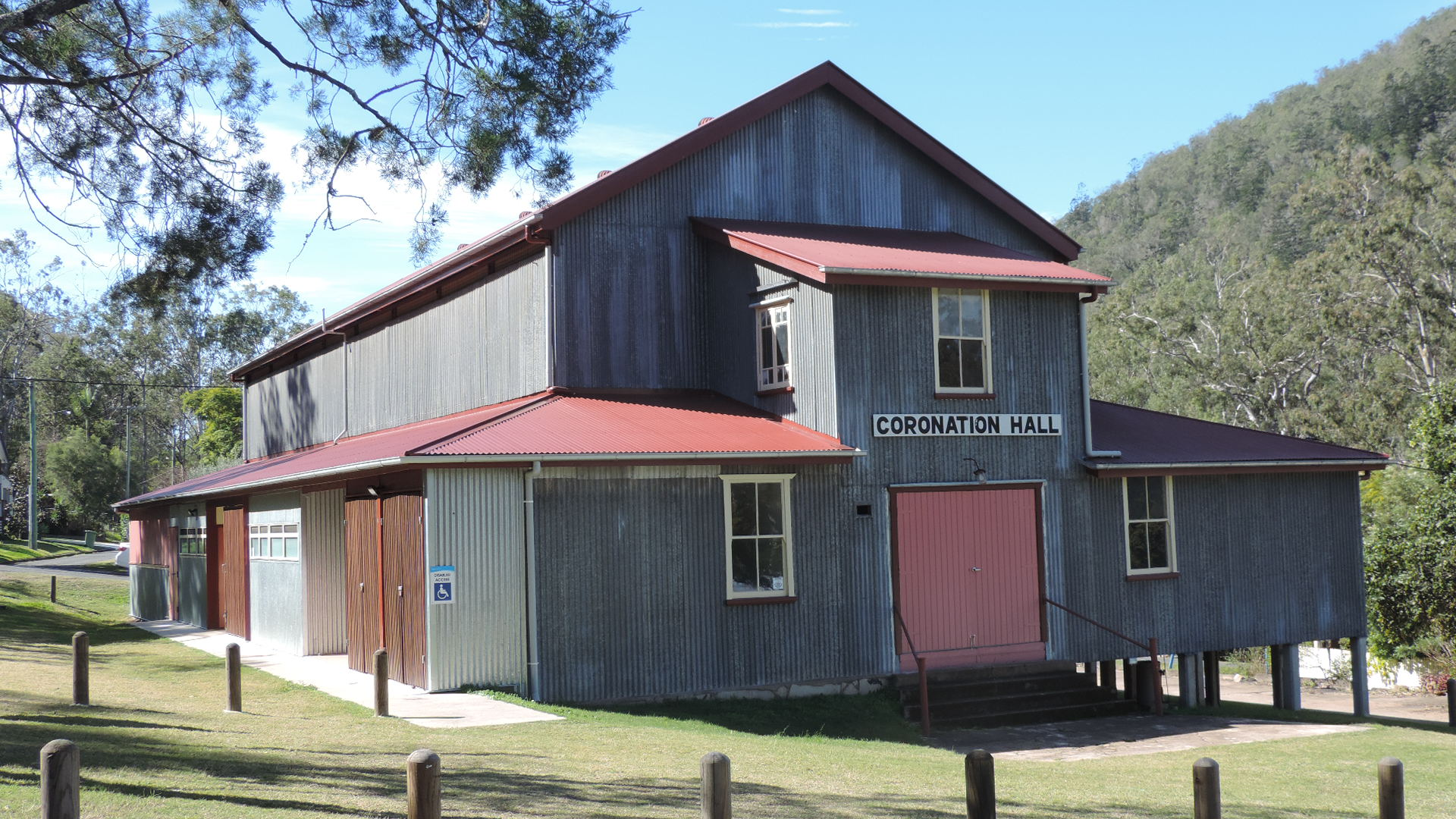
Coronation Hall, 2020

There are no schools in Somerset Dam. The nearest government primary schools are Toogoolawah State School in Toogoolawah to the west and Kilcoy State School in Kilcoy to the north. The nearest government secondary schools are Toogoolawah State High School, also in Toogooolawah, and Kilcoy State High School, also in Kilcoy.

== Amenities ==
St Joseph's Catholic Church is at 5 King Street (27.1187°S 152.5510°E). It is part of the Parish of St Mel's at Esk.

Coronation Hall is at 2 Short Street. It is operated by the Somerset Regional Council and continues to be used for local events and as a wedding venue.
