= Cooeeimbardi, Queensland =

Cooeeimbardi
- Suburb
- Interactive map of Cooeeimbardi
- Coordinates: 27.1152°S 152.5177°E
- Country: Australia
- State: Queensland
- LGA: Somerset Region
- Location: 19.3 km (12.0 mi) SE of Toogoolawah; 22.2 km (13.8 mi) SW of Esk; 78.0 km (48.5 mi) NNW of Ipswich; 98.6 km (61.3 mi) NW of Brisbane

Government
  - State electorate: Nanango
  - Federal division: Blair

Area
  - Total: 22.7 km^{2} (8.8 sq mi)

Population
  - Total: 0 (2021 census)
  - Density: 0.000/km^{2} (0.00/sq mi)
- Time zone: UTC+10:00 (AEST)
- Postcode: 4313
Suburbs around Cooeeimbardi
Lower Cressbrook	Fulham	Hazeldean
Lake Wivenhoe	Cooeeimbardi	Somerset Dam
Lake Wivenhoe	Somerset Dam	Somerset Dam

Cooeeimbardi is a rural locality in the Somerset Region, Queensland, Australia. In the 2021 census, Cooeeimbardi had "no people or a very low population".

== Geography ==
The Brisbane River forms the western and southern boundaries of the locality.

The northern and eastern parts of the locality is mostly undeveloped mountainous country, including the following named peaks:

- Mount Boorran (27.1161°S 152.5181°E) 475 metres (1,558 ft)
- Mount Somerset (27.1053°S 152.5160°E) 447 metres (1,467 ft)
- Point Deception (27.1243°S 152.5199°E) 463 metres (1,519 ft).

This land is mostly part of the Deer Reserve National Park (27.0811°S 152.526°E). The national park is 3,228 hectares (7,980 acres) and extends into the neighbouring localities of Fulham to the north, Hazeldean to the northeast, and Somerset Dam (the locality) to the east.

The southern and western areas of the locality are on lower flatter land (approx 70–80 metres above sea level). This land is freehold and the land use is predominantly grazing on native vegetation.

== History ==
Cooembardie Provisional School opened on 27 July 1927. On 1 September 1928, it became Cooembardie State School. It closed in March 1953. It was west of Cooeeimbardi Road at approx 27.1103°S 152.4840°E.

== Demographics ==
In the 2016 census, Cooeeimbardi had a population of 7 people.

In the 2021 census, Cooeeimbardi had "no people or a very low population".

== Education ==
There are no schools in Cooeeimbardi. The nearest government primary and secondary schools are Toogoolawah State School and Toogoolawah State High School, both in Toogoolawah to the west.
