= Hazeldean, Queensland =

Hazeldean
- Suburb
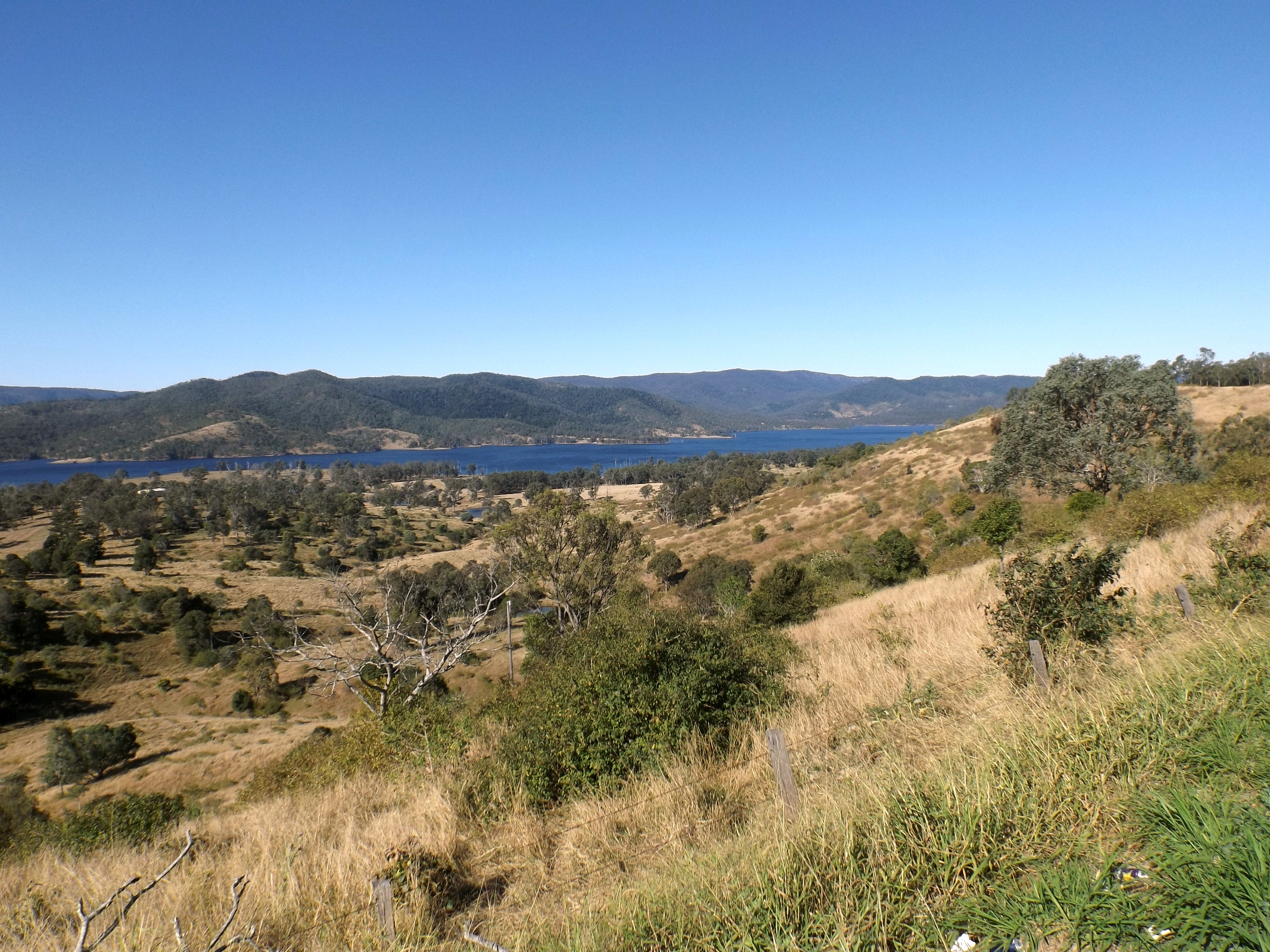
- D'Aguilar Range and Somerset Dam along Esk Kilcoy Road, 2015

- Interactive map of Hazeldean
- Coordinates: 27.0236°S 152.5463°E
- Country: Australia
- State: Queensland
- LGA: Somerset Region
- Location: 13.1 km (8.1 mi) SSW of Kilcoy; 39.5 km (24.5 mi) NE of Esk; 84.3 km (52.4 mi) N of Ipswich; 105 km (65 mi) NW of Brisbane

Government
  - State electorate: Nanango
  - Federal division: Blair

Area
  - Total: 86.8 km^{2} (33.5 sq mi)

Population
  - Total: 326 (2021 census)
  - Density: 3.756/km^{2} (9.727/sq mi)
- Time zone: UTC+10:00 (AEST)
- Postcode: 4515
Suburbs around Hazeldean
Gregors Creek	Woolmar	Winya
Fulham	Hazeldean	Westvale
Cooeeimbardi	Somerset Dam	Crossdale

Hazeldean is a rural locality in the Somerset Region, Queensland, Australia. In the 2021 census, Hazeldean had a population of 326 people.

== Geography ==
Lake Somerset occupies the east of the locality. Lake Somerset is the reservoir created by the Somerset Dam impounding the Stanley River.

The western part of the locality is elevated and remains mostly vegetated. The strip of land between the lake and the mountains is mostly rural-residential.

The Deer Reserve National Park (27.0811°S 152.526°E) is in the south-west of the locality and includes Mount Brisbane (27.0886°S 152.5272°E) in the south-western corner of the locality which is 684 metres (2,244 ft) above sea level. The national park is 3,228 hectares (7,980 acres) and extends into the neighbouring localities of Fulham to the west, Cooeeimbardi to the south-west and Somerset Dam (the locality) to the south.

The Deer Reserve State Forest (27.0006°S 152.4947°E) is in the north-west of the locality and includes Mount Goonneringerringgi (26.9999°S 152.5215°E) at 495 metres (1,624 ft) and Mount McConnel (26.9956°S 152.5089°E) at 277 metres (909 ft). The state forest is 2,894 hectares (7,150 acres) and extends into the neighbouring localities of Gregors Creek to the north-west and Fulham to the west.

== History ==
Stanley River Provisional School opened on 26 January 1898 with an initial enrolment of 24 students. On 1 January 1909, it became Stanley River State School. The school was on the eastern side of the Esk Kilcoy Road (approx 27.0068°S 152.5538°E).

In the 1920s, a 300-metre tramway was constructed in Hazeldean to move timber down a steep descent from mountain top to bottom.

As parts of Hazeldean would be flooded following the completion of the Somerset Dam across the Stanley River, in 1951, it was necessary to plan for road re-alignments. As part of this, it was decided to relocate the Stanley River State School to higher ground. A new 5.5 acres (2.2 ha) was chosen for the new school site further south on the Esk Kilcoy Road and the school buildings including the teacher's residence relocated to the new site. Down to 12 students enrolled, the school closed on 31 December 1973. On 9 July 1975, the Stanley River Field Study Centre opened in the school buildings, becoming the Stanley River Environmental Education Centre in 1990.

== Demographics ==
In the 2011 census, the population of Hazeldean was 267.

In the 2016 census, Hazeldean had a population of 262 people.

In the 2021 census, Hazeldean had a population of 326 people.

== Education ==
Stanley River Environmental Education Centre is an Outdoor and Environmental Education Centre at 3856 Esk-Kilcoy Road (27.0107°S 152.5526°E).

There are no mainstream schools in Hazeldean. The nearest government primary school is Kilcoy State School in Kilcoy to the north-east. The nearest government secondary schools are Kilcoy State High School in Kilcoy and Toogoolawah State High School in Toogoolawah to the south-west.

== Amenities ==
There are two boat ramps into the Lake Somerset Dam off Kirkleigh Road:

- Kirkleigh North (27.0191°S 152.5631°E).
- Kirkleigh South (27.0217°S 152.5612°E)

Both are managed by the Seqwater.

== Attractions ==
Lake Somerset Holiday Park is a large park on the edge of Somerset Dam which offers a range of accommodation including cabins and camping.

== See also ==
- List of tramways in Queensland
