= Glen Esk, Queensland =

Glen Esk
- Suburb
- Interactive map of Glen Esk
- Coordinates: 27.2233°S 152.4552°E
- Country: Australia
- State: Queensland
- LGA: Somerset Region
- Location: 4.3 km (2.7 mi) SE of Esk; 22.5 km (14.0 mi) SSE of Toogoolawah; 59.8 km (37.2 mi) NNW of Ipswich; 94.0 km (58.4 mi) NW of Brisbane

Government
  - State electorate: Nanango
  - Federal division: Blair

Area
  - Total: 27.1 km^{2} (10.5 sq mi)

Population
  - Total: 55 (2021 census)
  - Density: 2.030/km^{2} (5.26/sq mi)
- Time zone: UTC+10:00 (AEST)
- Postcode: 4312
Suburbs around Glen Esk
| Esk | Murrumba | Lake Wivenhoe |
| Esk | Glen Esk | Lake Wivenhoe |
| Esk | Esk | Moombra |

Glen Esk is a rural locality in the Somerset Region, Queensland, Australia. In the 2021 census, Glen Esk had a population of 55 people.

== Geography ==
The locality is on the western side of Lake Wivenhoe created by the Wivenhoe Dam across the Brisbane River, although the lake and its shoreline are within the locality of Lake Wivenhoe.

The terrain is mountainous in the north of the locality with named peaks: Mount Esk 444 metres (1,457 ft) and Burrundon Mountain 247 metres (810 ft) above sea level. The southern part of the locality is mostly 80 to 100 metres (260 to 330 ft). For comparison, the lake shoreline is approximately 70 metres (230 ft) above sea level.

The predominant land use is cattle grazing.

== History ==
The locality presumably takes its name from Mount Esk. The mountain and the associated pastoral station were named by pastoralists David Graham and James Ivory in 1843 after the Esk River in Scotland.

A police station was constructed at Glen Esk in 1877.

Glen Esk State School opened circa 1932 and closed circa 1955.

== Demographics ==
In the 2016 census, Glen Esk had a population of 54 people.

In the 2021 census, Glen Esk had a population of 55 people.

== Education ==
There are no schools in Glen Esk. The nearest government primary school is Esk State School in neighbouring Esk to the west. The nearest government secondary school is Toogoolawah State High School in Toogoolawah to the north-west.
