= Banks Creek =

Rural locality split between the City of Brisbane and Somerset Region

- Suburb
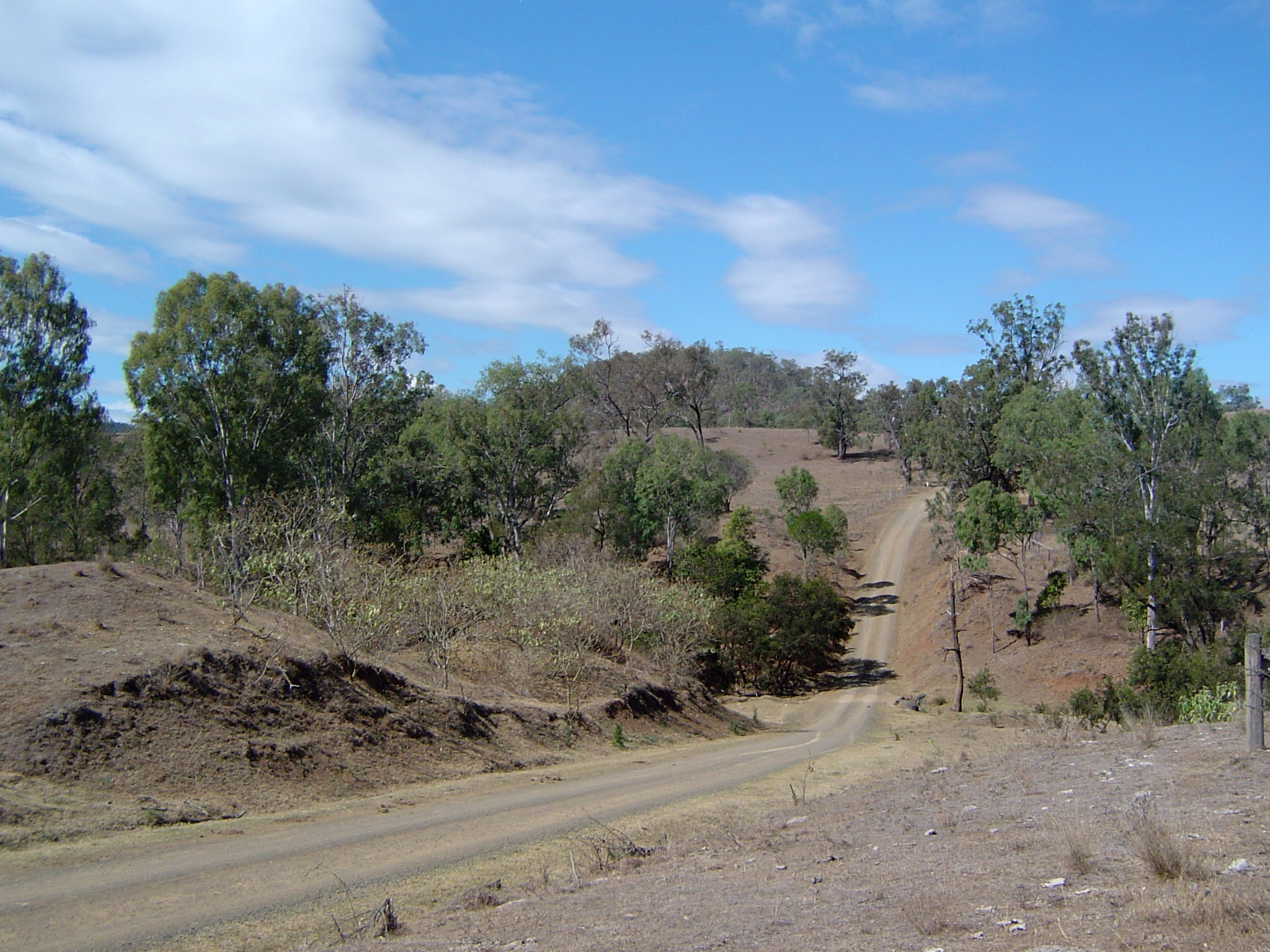
- England Creek Banks Creek Road, 2014

- Interactive map of Banks Creek
- Coordinates: 27.4152°S 152.7177°E
- Country: Australia
- State: Queensland
- LGAs: Somerset Region; City of Brisbane
- Location: 35 km (22 mi) SE of Esk; 29 km (18 mi) NW of Brisbane

Government
  - State electorates: Nanango; Moggill; Lockyer
  - Federal divisions: Blair; Ryan

Area
  - Total: 42.2 km^{2} (16.3 sq mi)

Population
  - Total: 11 (2021 census)
  - Density: 0.261/km^{2} (0.675/sq mi)
- Time zone: UTC+10:00 (AEST)
- Postcode: 4306
Suburbs around Banks Creek
England Creek	England Creek	Mount Nebo
England Creek	Banks Creek	Lake Manchester
Fernvale	Lake Manchester	Lake Manchester

Banks Creek is a rural locality split between the City of Brisbane and Somerset Region in Queensland, Australia. The locality is also split for the purposes of state and federal elections. In the 2021 census, Banks Creek had a population of 11 people.

== Geography ==
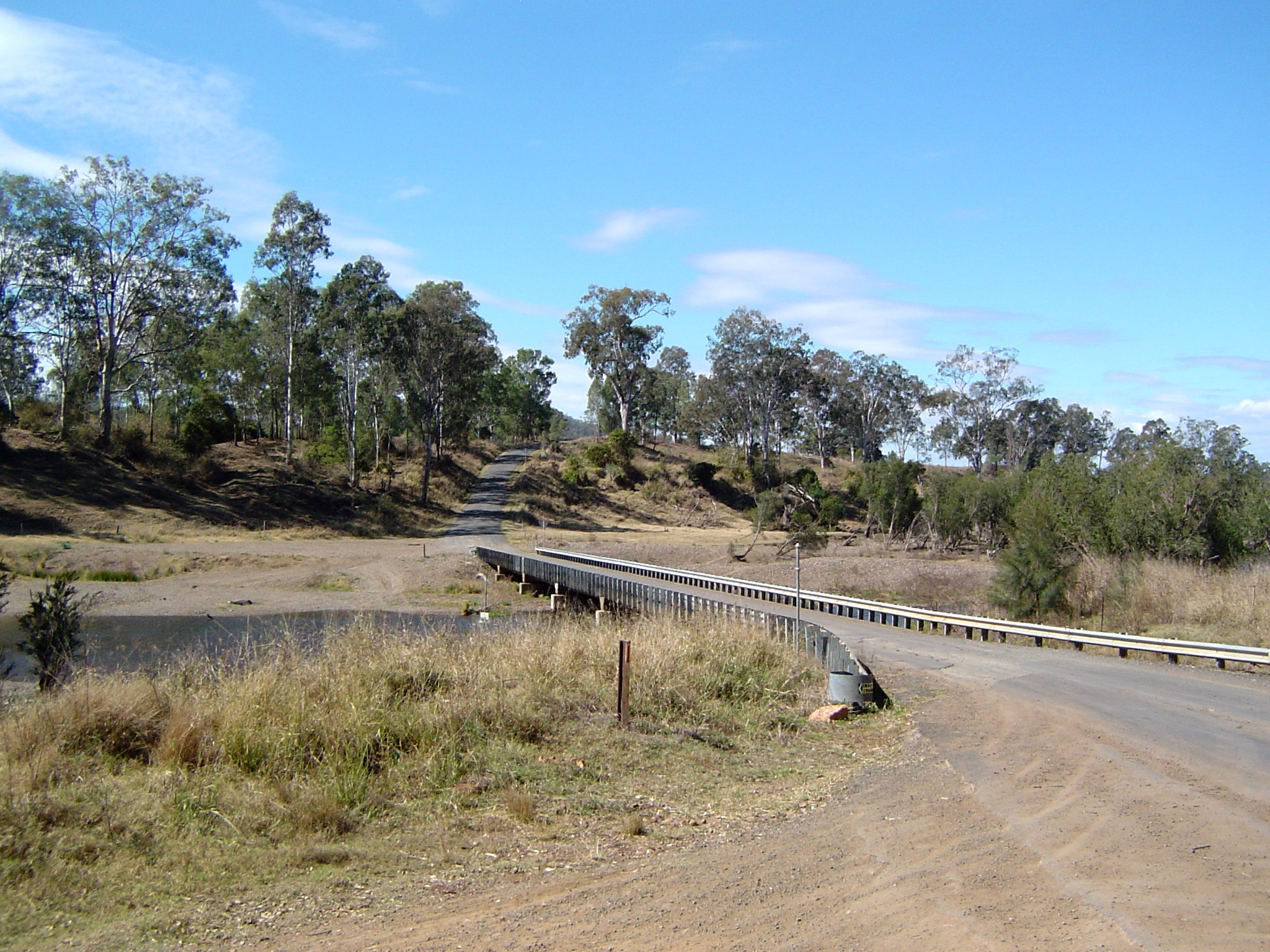
Savages Crossing, 2014

The Brisbane River forms the south-western boundary of the locality.

Banks Creek Road is the main route through the locality. It commences at the Brisbane Valley Highway in Fernvale, entering the locality of Banks Creek from the south-west.

The locality takes its name from the creek of the same name, which flows through the locality to its confluence with the Brisbane River at Savages Crossing (27.44385°S 152.67032°E), where Banks Creek Road has an unnamed bridge over the Brisbane River.

== History ==
A sawmill was built in the district in 1911.

In 1927, flooding of the Brisbane River cut a deep channel in the river where Banks Creek Road crossed the river. A low-level bridge was built by Mr Davidson, junior, to enable traffic to cross.

In the 1930s, Banks Creek became known for its high-quality Cavendish bananas.

== Demographics ==
In the 2016 census, Banks Creek had a population of 5 people.

In the 2021 census, Banks Creek had a population of 11 people.

== Education ==
There are no schools in Banks Creek. The nearest government primary school is Fernvale State School in neighbouring Fernvale to the south-west. The nearest government secondary school is Lowood State High School in Lowood to the south-west.
