= Moombra, Queensland =

Moombra
- Suburb
- Interactive map of Moombra
- Coordinates: 27.2986°S 152.4844°E
- Country: Australia
- State: Queensland
- LGA: Somerset Region
- Location: 8.4 km (5.2 mi) SW of Esk; 55.7 km (34.6 mi) NNW of Ipswich; 93.2 km (57.9 mi) NW of Brisbane

Government
  - State electorate: Nanango
  - Federal division: Blair

Area
  - Total: 53.3 km^{2} (20.6 sq mi)

Population
  - Total: 9 (2021 census)
  - Density: 0.169/km^{2} (0.437/sq mi)
- Time zone: UTC+10:00 (AEST)
- Postcode: 4312
Suburbs around Moombra
Esk	Glen Esk	Lake Wivenhoe
Mount Hallen	Moombra	Lake Wivenhoe
Coominya	Coominya	Lake Wivenhoe

Moombra is a rural locality in the Somerset Region, Queensland, Australia. In the 2021 census, Moombra had a population of 9 people.

== Geography ==
The locality is located on the north-western side of Lake Wivenhoe created by the Wivenhoe Dam across the Brisbane River. Although very close to the lake, the lake and its shoreline are within the locality of Lake Wivenhoe.

The Brisbane Valley Highway passes through the locality from south (Coominya) to north (Glen Esk).

The predominant land use is cattle grazing.

== History ==
The name Moomba is believed to be the Waka language name for the land between Mount Hallen and the Brisbane River (now Lake Wivenhoe).

Following the closure of the Riverside Pine Mountain school, the Five Mile Water Provisional School opened on 19 February 1883. In February 1892, it was renamed Moombra Provisional School. It closed in 1905.

On 7 March 1910, Moombra State School opened but it closed in 1926 due to low student numbers. It reopened in 1928 but closed again in 1932.

== Demographics ==
In the 2016 census, Moombra had a population of 9 people.

In the 2021 census, Moombra had a population of 9 people.

== Education ==
There are no schools in Moombra. The nearest government primary schools are Esk State School in neighbouring Esk to the north-west and Coominya State School in neighbouring Coominya to the south. The nearest government secondary schools are Toogoolawah State High Schoool in Toogoolawah 27.4 kilometres (17.0 mi) to the north-west and Lowood State High School in Lowood 31.6 kilometres (19.6 mi) to the south-east.
