= Coal Creek, Queensland =

Coal Creek
- Suburb
- Interactive map of Coal Creek
- Coordinates: 27.1819°S 152.4344°E
- Country: Australia
- State: Queensland
- LGA: Somerset Region
- Location: 9.7 km (6.0 mi) NE of Esk; 17.5 km (10.9 mi) SSW of Toogoolawah; 73.8 km (45.9 mi) NNW of Ipswich; 103 km (64 mi) NW of Brisbane

Government
  - State electorate: Nanango
  - Federal division: Blair

Area
  - Total: 24.3 km^{2} (9.4 sq mi)

Population
  - Total: 50 (2021 census)
  - Density: 2.06/km^{2} (5.3/sq mi)
- Time zone: UTC+10:00 (AEST)
- Postcode: 4312
Suburbs around Coal Creek
Ottaba	Mount Beppo	Caboonbah
Biarra	Coal Creek	Lake Wivenhoe
Biarra	Esk	Murrumba

Coal Creek is a rural locality in the Somerset Region, Queensland, Australia. In the 2021 census, Coal Creek had a population of 50 people.

== Geography ==
The watercourse Coal Creek enters the locality from the west (Biarra) and then meanders through the south of the locality before exiting to the east. Once it was a tributary of the Brisbane River but now contributes directly into the upper reaches of Lake Wivenhoe created by the Wivenhoe Dam across the river.

The Brisbane Valley Highway enters the locality from the south (Esk), then forms part of the south-western boundary of the locality, before exiting to the west (Biarra). The Esk Kilcoy Road enters the locality from the south (Esk) and travels in a north-eastly direction through the locality, forming part of the south-east and the north-east boundary of the locality before exiting to the north-east (Caboonbah).

The land use is predominantly grazing on native vegetation.

== History ==
The locality presumably takes its name from the creek.

Coal Creek Provisional School opened on 7 November 1892. By 1897, it had about 30 students. On 1 January 1909, it became Coal Creek State School. It closed in 1948. It was at 154 Coal Creek Road (27.1728°S 152.4334°E).

== Demographics ==
In the 2016 census, Coal Creek had a population of 52 people. On average, each household in Coal Creek was inhabited by 2.1 people, compared to the national average of 2.6. 2016 was the first year in which the Australian census collected data specifically for Coal Creek.

In the 2021 census, Coal Creek had a population of 50 people.

== Education ==
There are no schools in Coal Creek. The nearest government primary school is Esk State School in neighbouring Esk to the south. The nearest government secondary school is Toogoolawah State High School in Toogoolawah to the north-west.
