= Lower Cressbrook, Queensland =

Lower Cressbrook
- Suburb
- Interactive map of Lower Cressbrook
- Coordinates: 27.0816°S 152.4761°E
- Country: Australia
- State: Queensland
- LGA: Somerset Region
- Location: 14.8 km (9.2 mi) E of Toogoolawah; 26.7 km (16.6 mi) NNE of Esk; 103 km (64 mi) NW of Brisbane

Government
  - State electorate: Nanango
  - Federal division: Blair

Area
  - Total: 15.7 km^{2} (6.1 sq mi)

Population
  - Total: 21 (2021 census)
  - Density: 1.34/km^{2} (3.46/sq mi)
- Time zone: UTC+10:00 (AEST)
- Postcode: 4313
Suburbs around Lower Cressbrook
Fulham	Fulham	Fulham
Cressbrook	Lower Cressbrook	Cooeeimbardi
Lake Wivenhoe	Cooeeimbardi	Cooeeimbardi

Lower Cressbrook is a rural locality in the Somerset Region, Queensland, Australia. In the 2021 census, Lower Cressbrook had a population of 21 people.

== Geography ==
The land use is predominantly grazing on native vegetation with some crop growing in the north-west of the locality.

== History ==
Cressbrook Lower State School opened on 11 April 1916 and closed in 1953. It was at 2 Monks Road (corner Cooeeimbardi Road, 27.05595°S 152.45333°E) now within the neighbouring locality of Fulham.

== Demographics ==
In the 2016 census, Lower Cressbrook had a population of 16 people.

In the 2021 census, Lower Cressbrook had a population of 21 people.

== Education ==
There are no schools in Lower Cressbrook. The nearest government primary and secondary schools are Toogoolawah State School and Toogoolawah State High School, both in Toogoolawah to the west.
