= Murrumba, Queensland =

Murrumba
- Suburb
- Interactive map of Murrumba
- Coordinates: 27.2025°S 152.4677°E
- Country: Australia
- State: Queensland
- LGA: Somerset Region
- Location: 7.8 km (4.8 mi) NE of Esk; 18.3 km (11.4 mi) SSE of Toogoolawah; 71.8 km (44.6 mi) NNW of Ipswich CBD; 109 km (68 mi) NW of Brisbane CBD

Government
  - State electorate: Nanango
  - Federal division: Blair

Area
  - Total: 8.0 km^{2} (3.1 sq mi)

Population
  - Total: 0 (2021 census)
  - Density: 0.00/km^{2} (0.00/sq mi)
- Time zone: UTC+10:00 (AEST)
- Postcode: 4312
Suburbs around Murrumba
Coal Creek	Lake Wivenhoe	Lake Wivenhoe
Coal Creek	Murrumba	Lake Wivenhoe
Esk	Glen Esk	Glen Esk

Murrumba is a rural locality in the Somerset Region, Queensland, Australia. In the 2021 census, Murrumba had "no people or a very low population".

== History ==
The name Murrumba is an Aboriginal word combination, in the Kabi language, meaning good spirit or good place.

Murrumba State School opened on 6 September 1910. It closed on 8 March 1964. It was located approximately 27.1995°S 152.4894°E on Murrumba Road. That section of Murrumba Road no longer exists as it was realigned due to the construction of Lake Wivenhoe, but originally the road continued east to the Murrumba Bridge over the Brisbane River. The school's location is now in the foreshore area of the lake and hence part of the locality of Lake Wivenhoe.

== Demographics ==
In the 2016 census, Murrumba had a population of 16 people.

In the 2021 census, Murrumba had "no people or a very low population".

== Education ==
There are no schools in Murrumba. The nearest government primary school is Esk State School in neighbouring Esk to the south-east. The nearest government secondary school is Toogoolawah State High School in Toogoolawah to the north-west.

== Transport ==
No public transport serves the area.
