= Wivenhoe Power Station =

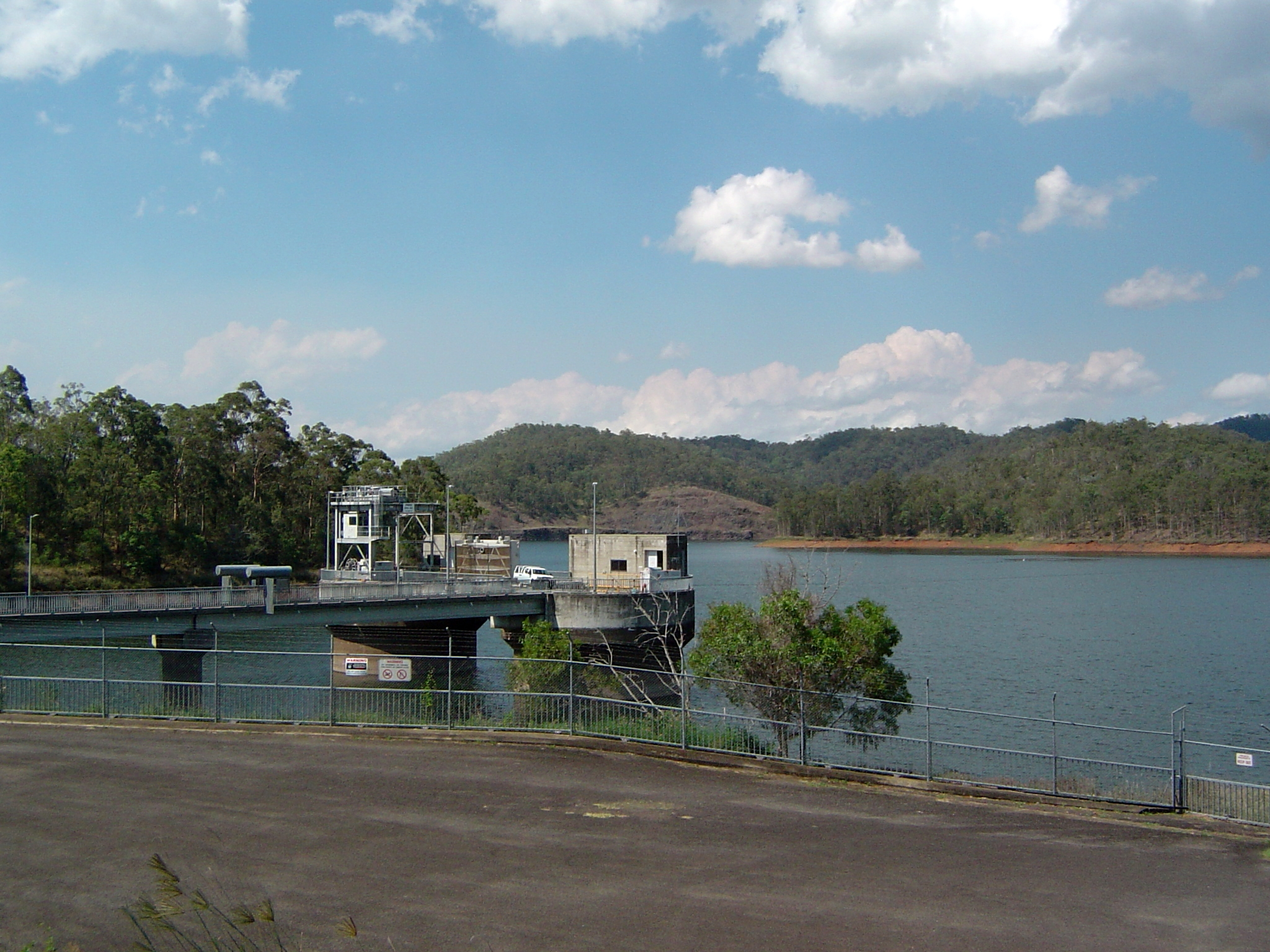
- Power station at Splityard Creek Dam
- Country: Australia
- Location: Split Yard Creek, Queensland
- Coordinates: 27.37222°S 152.63194°E
- Status: Operational
- Opening date: 1984
- Owner(s): CleanCo

Upper reservoir
- Creates: Splityard Creek Dam
- Total capacity: 28,600-megalitre

Lower reservoir
- Creates: Lake Wivenhoe

Power Station
- Hydraulic head: 76 m (249 ft)
- Installed capacity: 570 MW

The Wivenhoe Power Station is situated between the Splityard Creek Dam and Lake Wivenhoe in the locality of Split Yard Creek, Somerset Region, Queensland, Australia. The Splityard Creek Dam is located in hills adjacent to Lake Wivenhoe and is about 100 metres (330 ft) above it. The power station is the only pumped storage hydroelectric plant in Queensland.

The Wivenhoe Dam has been built across the Brisbane River about 80 kilometres (50 mi) by road from the centre of Brisbane, the capital of the state of Queensland, Australia. The body of water held behind the dam is called Lake Wivenhoe.

== Operation ==
The pumped storage hydroelectricity power station consists of two circular concrete silos, each of about 32 metres (105 ft) internal diameter. Each of the silos houses a 285 megawatts (382,000 hp) turbine generator spinning at 120 rpm and pump set, giving a total capacity of 570 megawatts (760,000 hp).

During the pumping phase in the operating cycle the generator operates as a 240 megawatts (320,000 hp) electric motor driving the pump to lift water from Lake Wivenhoe to the upper storage of the 28,600-megalitre Splityard Creek Dam. When peak demand for electricity occurs the flow of water is reversed, flowing from the upper to the lower storage and driving the turbine generator to generate electricity.

The Splityard Creek Dam has sufficient capacity for 10 hours of continuous power generation. It takes about 14 hours of pumping to refill it. Wivenhoe is used in 20% of peak hours, reducing peak price obtained by other power plants. It earned almost $35 million when the Callide Power Station failed in 2021. The power station is owned and operated by CleanCo Queensland a Queensland Government owned corporation. Twin 275KV transmission lines connect the power station to Queensland's grid system.

In 2021, a major overhaul of the station was undertaken. It included the repair and refurbishment of one of the turbines, corrosion protection painting of machinery and pipes, and repairs to a transformer.

== Wivenhoe Small Hydro ==
A second hydro-electric power station known as Wivenhoe Small Hydro powered by water discharging from the Wivenhoe Dam into the Brisbane River commenced operation in March 2003. It has a much lower power output of 4.5 MW. In 2021, a major overhaul project was planned to preserve the reliability of the plant, and to create 100 new jobs in accordance to Australia's recovery plan from the COVID-19 pandemic.

== See also ==
- List of active power stations in Queensland
