= Splityard Creek Dam =

Dam in south-east Queensland, Australia

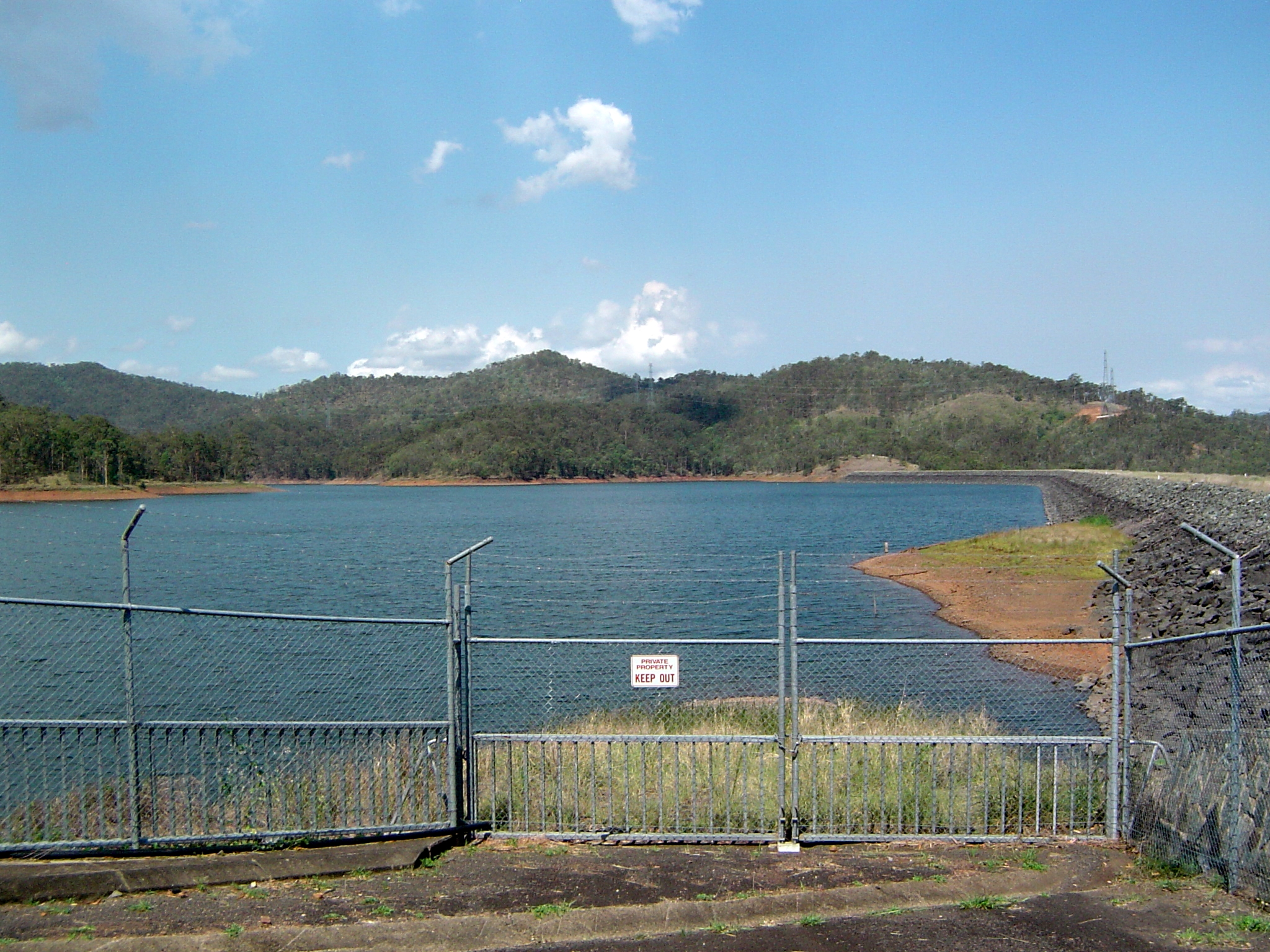

- Location of the Splityard Creek Dam in Queensland
- Country: Australia
- Location: South East Queensland
- Coordinates: 27°22′16″S 152°38′13″E
- Purpose: Power
- Status: Operational
- Construction began: 1977
- Opening date: 1980
- Built by: Thiess Brothers and John Holland
- Owner: CleanCo Queensland
- Operator: CS Energy

Dam and spillways
- Type of dam: Embankment dam
- Impounds: Pryde Creek
- Height: 76 m (249 ft)
- Length: 1,140 m (3,740 ft)
- Dam volume: 69×10^{3} m^{3} (2.4×10^{6} cu ft)
- Spillway type: Uncontrolled
- Spillway capacity: 570 m^{3}/s (20,000 cu ft/s)

Reservoir
- Total capacity: 28,700 ML (23,300 acre⋅ft)
- Catchment area: 3.8 km^{2} (1.5 sq mi)
- Surface area: 105 ha (260 acres)
- Maximum width: 294 m (965 ft)

Wivenhoe Power Station
- Operator: CS Energy
- Commission date: 1984
- Type: Pumped-storage
- Turbines: 2
- Installed capacity: 500 MW (670,000 hp)
- Website; Wivenhoe Power Station

The Splityard Creek Dam is a rock and earth-fill embankment dam across the Pryde Creek in the South East region of Queensland, Australia. The sole purpose of the dam is for the generation of hydroelectricity. The impounded reservoir is called the Splityard Creek Reservoir.

== Location and features ==
The dam is located 30 kilometres (19 mi) northwest of Ipswich in the Somerset Region and forms the upper reservoir for the Wivenhoe Power Station.

Construction commenced in 1977 and was completed in 1980 by contractors Thiess Brothers and John Holland. The rock and earthfill dam structure is 76 metres (249 ft) high and 1,140 metres (3,740 ft) long. The resultant reservoir has a capacity of 28,600 megalitres (23,200 acre⋅ft) when full that covers a surface area of 102 hectares (250 acres), and is drawn from a catchment area of 3.8 square kilometres (1.5 sq mi). The uncontrolled un-gated spillway has a discharge capacity of 570 cubic metres per second (20,000 cu ft/s). The asset was transferred to CleanCo Queensland in October 2019.

=== Power station ===
Owned by CleanCo Queensland and operated by CS Energy, Wivenhoe Power Station is located on the eastern side of Wivenhoe Dam, north west of Brisbane. The station, which began commercial operation in 1984, was Queensland's first pumped-storage hydro-electric plant. It is operated remotely from an operating centre used to manage the Queensland electricity grid.

The dam's water capacity is enough for the power station to run at full load for approximately ten hours. Using both pumps, this water can be replaced in about 14 hours. The pumped storage power station consists of two circular concrete silos, each of about 32 metres (105 ft) internal diameter. Each of the silos houses a 250 megawatts (340,000 hp) turbine generator and pump set, giving a total capacity of 500 megawatts (670,000 hp).

== Recreation ==
Public access including swimming is banned from the dam due to strong currents and submerged hazards.

== See also ==
- List of dams in Queensland
- Wivenhoe Dam
- Wivenhoe Power Station
