= Lake Wivenhoe =

- Suburb
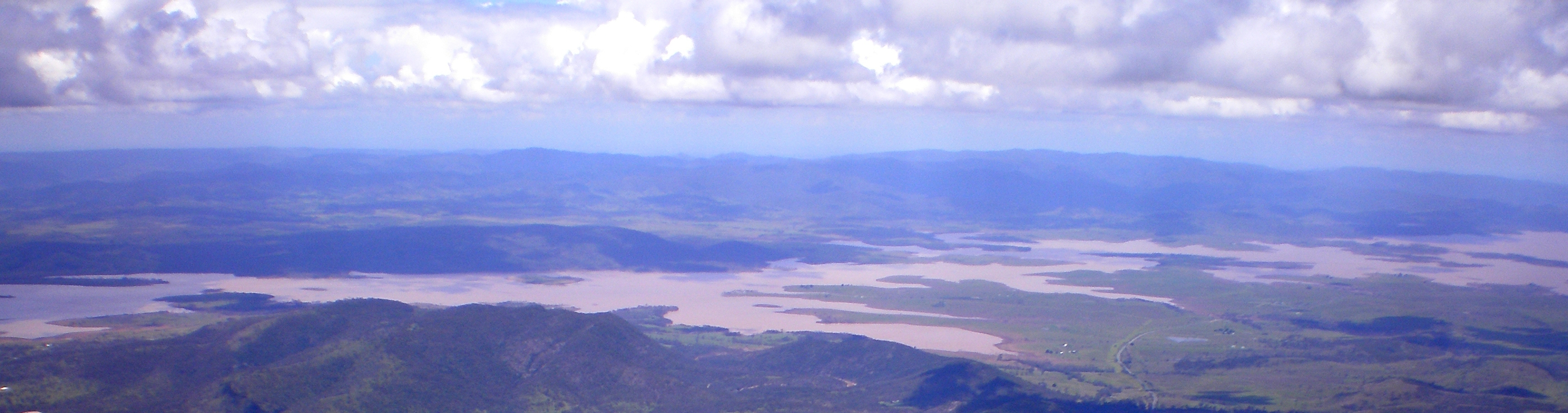

- Interactive map of Lake Wivenhoe
- Coordinates: 27.3152°S 152.5677°E
- Country: Australia
- State: Queensland
- LGA: Somerset Region
- Location: 11.1 km (6.9 mi) SE of Esk; 27.5 km (17.1 mi) N of Lowood; 29.3 km (18.2 mi) SSE of Toogoolawah; 53 km (33 mi) NNW of Ipswich CBD; 90.5 km (56.2 mi) NW of Brisbane CBD

Government
  - State electorate: Nanango
  - Federal division: Blair

Area
  - Total: 202.5 km^{2} (78.2 sq mi)

Population
  - Total: 0 (2021 census)
  - Density: 0.0000/km^{2} (0.000/sq mi)
- Time zone: UTC+10:00 (AEST)
- Postcode: 4311

Lake Wivenhoe is the name of both an artificial lake formed by the Wivenhoe Dam and the locality which contains it in the Somerset Region, Queensland, Australia. In the 2021 census, Lake Wivenhoe had "no people or a very low population".

== Geography ==
The locality includes the dam wall and associated water management infrastructure at the south, the lake created by the dam, sections of Brisbane River and Stanley River as they flow into the lake from the north and a narrow strip of land around the dam, the lake and river the sections. The lake's boundaries are very irregular and this is reflected in the very irregular boundaries of the locality. The locality is entirely set aside for water management purposes.

Due to its unusual shape, Lake Wivenhoe has many adjacent localities including (commencing from the dam wall in the south and proceeding clockwise:Wivenhoe Pocket, Patrick Estate, Wivenhoe Hill, Coominya, Moombra, Glen Esk, Murrumba, Coal Creek, Caboonbah, Mount Beppo, Cressbrook, Lower Cressbrook, Cooeeimbardi, Somerset Dam, Crossdale, Bryden, Dundas, and Split Yard Creek.

The Brisbane Valley Highway passes through the south of the locality as it travels across the top of the dam wall.

Wash Pool Knoll is a hill on the south-western bank of the lake (27.3714°S 152.6084°E) 84 metres (276 ft) above sea level.

The formation of the lake created numerous headlands, inlets, bays and islands.

=== Headlands ===
Headlands into the lake include:

- Bauer Point (27.3287°S 152.5384°E)
- Brough Point (27.2373°S 152.5053°E)
- Conroys Point (27.2655°S 152.5612°E)
- Crowe Point (27.3358°S 152.5675°E)
- Harris Point (27.3812°S 152.6134°E)
- Lees Point (27.1836°S 152.4795°E)
- Loganview Point (27.3367°S 152.5445°E)
- Mclean Point (27.3560°S 152.5286°E)
- Monreid Point (27.2617°S 152.5477°E)
- O'Briens Point (27.2570°S 152.5202°E)
- Pakleppa Point (27.3075°S 152.5295°E)
- Robenlea Point (27.2833°S 152.5568°E)
- Rockville Point (27.2904°S 152.5325°E)
- Sinnamon Point (27.2292°S 152.4906°E)
- Wheelers Point (27.1840°S 152.4720°E)
- Whitfield Point (27.3236°S 152.5345°E)

=== Inlets and bays ===
Inlets and bays in the lake include:

- Apel Inlet (27.2566°S 152.5622°E)
- Bellevue Bay (27.3359°S 152.5344°E)
- Billies Bay 27.3400°S 152.6205°E)
- Burrundon Bay (27.2331°S 152.4830°E)
- Coal Inlet (27.1886°S 152.4636°E)
- Conroys Cove (27.3233°S 152.5261°E)
- Cormorant Bay (27.3984°S 152.6288°E)
- Davis Bay (27.2928°S 152.5580°E)
- Five Mile Water (27.3025°S 152.5163°E)
- Logan Inlet (27.3538°S 152.5316°E)
- McGraths Bay (27.3458°S 152.5797°E)
- Middle Inlet (27.2483°S 152.5483°E)
- Moioo Bay (27.3470°S 152.5705°E)
- Moombra Bay (27.2942°S 152.5232°E)
- Northbrook Inlet (27.3233°S 152.6038°E)
- Paddys Inlet (27.2566°S 152.5080°E)
- Sheep Station Inlet (27.3830°S 152.5858°E)
- Tea Tree Inlet (27.2788°S 152.5302°E)
- Tulungra Inlet (27.2719°S 152.5413°E)
- Varleys Cove (27.3094°S 152.5816°E)

=== Islands ===
There is one island in the lake itself:

- Murrumba Island, a 38.0079-hectare (93.920-acre) island (27.2198°S 152.5084°E)

and two others in the Brisbane River leading into the lake:

- Marshall Island, a 9.2541-hectare (22.867-acre) island (27.1523°S 152.5530°E)
- Stanley Island, a 12.3444-hectare (30.504-acre) island (27.1462°S 152.5585°E)

== History ==
The name Wivenhoe comes from the name of the pastoral property established circa 1845 by Edmund Blucher Uhr, which took its name from the town of Wivenhoe in Essex, England.

The heritage-listed Caboonbah Homestead was located on to the north-west of the lake (near but not within the locality of Caboonbah) where it was a tourist attraction operated by the Brisbane Valley Historical Society until the homestead burned down in 2009.

== Demographics ==
In the 2016 census, Lake Wivenhoe had a population of 3 people.

In the 2021 census, Lake Wivenhoe had "no people or a very low population".

== Heritage listings ==
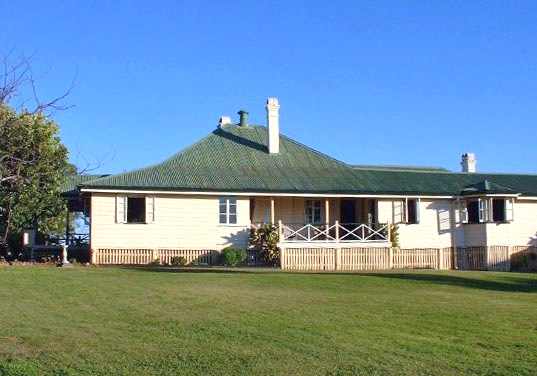
Caboonbah homestead, 2009

Lake Wivenhoe has a number of heritage-listed sites, including:

- Caboonbah Homestead, Esk-Kilcoy Road (27.1437°S 152.4919°E)

== Education ==
There are no schools in the locality. The nearest government primary schools are (from north to south):

- Toogoolawah State School in Toogoolawah to the north-west
- Esk State School in Esk to the west
- Coominya State School in neighbouring Coominya to the south-west
- Fernvale State School in Fernvale to the south

The nearest government secondary schools are (from north to south):

- Toogoolawah State High School in Toogoolawah
- Lowood State High School in Lowood to the south

== Transport ==
There are three main roads in the area. The Brisbane Valley Highway comes to the lake from the south and then travels along the western side of the lake towards Esk. Wivenhoe Somerset Road separates from the highway at the south of the lake and travels along the eastern side of the dam towards Somerset Dam. Due to the irregular shape of the boundaries of the locality around the lake, both roads weave through the locality and the adjacent localities on each side of the lake. Northbank Parkway comes from Mount Glorious to the east and terminates on the east of the lake at Wivenhoe Somerset Road.

Northbrook Parkway heliport is at the junction of Wivenhoe Somerset Road and Northbank Parkway (27.3110°S 152.6185°E).

== Attractions and amenities ==
Although it is not a populated area, Lake Wivenhoe offers a range of outdoor recreational facilities for camping, picnics, swimming, fishing and water sports. A stocked impoundment permit is required to fish in the dam. Swimming is permitted and camp sites have been established. Electric and non-powered boating with a permit is allowed, but domestic animals are banned.

=== West of the lake ===
Cormorant Bay Recreation Area has picnic and barbeque facilities and a children's playground. It is suitable for walking and fishing. It is off the Brisbane Valley Highway (27.4003°S 152.6207°E).

Wivenhoe Dam Spillway has a lookout over the dam spillway. It has picnic and barbeque facilities. It is off the Brisbane Valley Highway (27.3962°S 152.6088°E).

Lake Wivenhoe Information Centre provides information about the dam and the lake. It is off the Brisbane Valley Highway (27.3904°S 152.5942°E).

Wivenhoe Hill Trails are for walking, cycling and horse riding. They are off Fig Tree Road (27.3820°S 152.6031°E).

Logan Complex has three separate areas, one for day use (27.3493°S 152.5453°E) and two for camping: Captain Logan camp ground (27.3493°S 152.5491°E) and the Lumley Hill camp ground (27.3473°S 152.5520°E). There are picnic and barbeque facilities and a children's playground. This area is suitable for swimming, fishing, canoeing and water sports. Logan Complex is on Logan Inlet Road on the western side of the lake. It has a boat ramp (27.3499°S 152.5435°E).

Hamon Cove Recreation Area has picnic and barbeque facilities and is suitable for fishing, canoeing and water sports. It is on the western side of the lake off the Brisbane Valley Highway (27.3009°S 152.5180°E). It has a boat ramp (27.3012°S 152.5184°E).

=== East of the lake ===
Billies Bay Recreation Area has picnic and barbeque facilities. This area is suitable for swimming, fishing, canoeing and water sports. It is off Bryden Road (27.3394°S 152.6138°E). It has a boat ramp (27.3408°S 152.6145°E).

Hays Landing Recreation Area has picnic and barbeque facilities. This area is suitable for fishing, canoeing and water sports. It is off Bryden Road (27.3348°S 152.6064°E). It has a boat ramp (27.3340°S 152.6099°E).

=== North of the lake ===
O'Shea's Crossing Rest Area has picnic and barbeque facilities and is suitable for fishing and canoeing. It is on the corner of Esk Kilcoy Road and Cooeeimbardi Road (27.1373°S 152.5115°E).
