= Deer Reserve National Park =

National park in Queensland, Australia

Coordinates: 27.087°S 152.526°E

Deer Reserve National Park is a protected area in the Somerset Region of Queensland, in the South East Queensland bioregion, Australia.

== History ==
The area was set aside as a timber reserve in 1912. The name "Deer Reserve" refers to a gift of red deer from Queen Victoria to the people of Queensland circa 1873. The deer were released near the Cressbrook Station as there were concerns about releasing them where they might damage the crops.

In 2006, the Deer Reserve Forest was gazetted as the Deer Reserve National Park.

== Geography ==
The national park covers an area of 32.3 square kilometers. It is located 480 meters above sea level.

== Flora ==
Plants protected in Deer Reserve National Park and the adjoining Deer Reserve State Forest include Plectranthus leiperi.
