= Wivenhoe Dam =

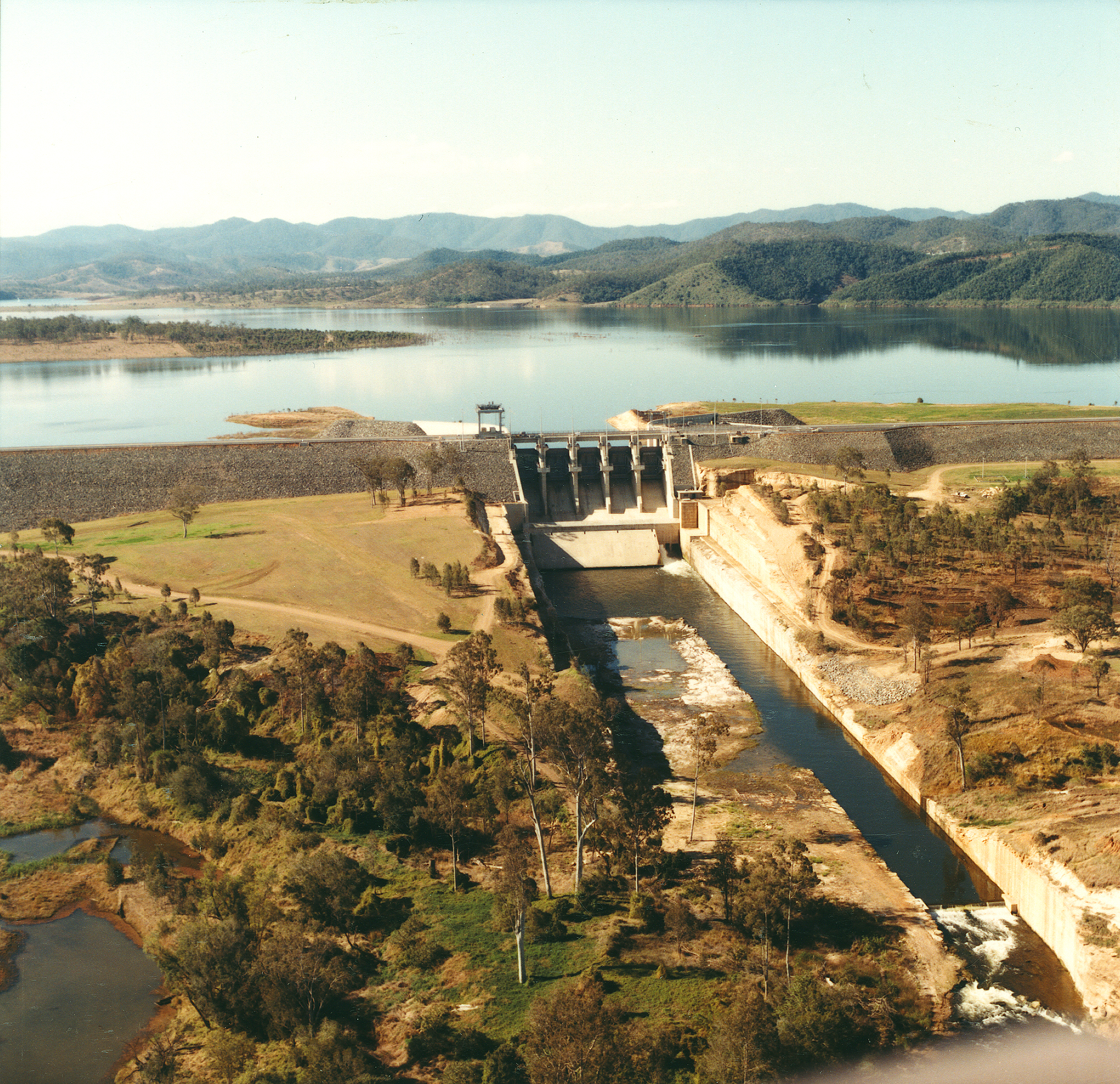
- Wivenhoe Dam, wall, and spillway, 1985

- Location of the Wivenhoe Dam in Queensland
- Country: Australia
- Location: South East Queensland
- Coordinates: 27°23′38″S 152°36′28″E
- Purpose: Potable water supply; Flood mitigation; Hydroelectricity; Recreation
- Status: Operational
- Construction began: March 1973; 53 years ago
- Opening date: 1984; 42 years ago
- Operator: SEQ Water

Dam and spillways
- Type of dam: Embankment dam
- Impounds: Brisbane River
- Height: 59 m (194 ft)
- Height (thalweg): 23 m (75 ft) AHD
- Length: 2,300 m (7,500 ft)
- Elevation at crest: 79 m (259 ft) AHD
- Dam volume: 4,140×10^{3} m^{3} (146×10^{6} cu ft)
- Spillways: 2
- Spillway type: Service, controlled crest-overflow; Auxiliary
- Spillway capacity: 12,000 m^{3}/s (420,000 cu ft/s)

Reservoir
- Creates: Wivenhoe Reservoir
- Total capacity: 1,165,238 ML (256,317×10^{6} imp gal; 307,823×10^{6} US gal)
- Catchment area: 7,020 km^{2} (2,710 sq mi)
- Surface area: 109.4 km^{2} (42.2 sq mi)

Wivenhoe Power Station
- Operator: Tarong Energy
- Commission date: May 1984
- Type: Pumped-storage
- Turbines: 2
- Installed capacity: 500 MW (670,000 hp)
- Website www.seqwater.com.au

Wivenhoe Dam is a rock and earth-fill embankment dam with a concrete spillway across the Brisbane River in South East Queensland, Australia. The dam takes it names from the local Wivenhoe Pocket rural community. The dam wall is located about 80 kilometres (50 mi) by road from the centre of Brisbane. The primary purpose of the dam is the supply of potable water for the Brisbane and Ipswich regions. South-east Queensland's largest dam also provides for flood mitigation control, hydroelectricity, and recreation. The impounded reservoir is called Lake Wivenhoe and the dam, the lake and a narrow strip of surrounding land forms a locality also called Lake Wivenhoe.

Wivenhoe Dam was planned in the early 1970s. The 1974 Brisbane flood highlighted the need for flood protection for South East Queensland. The lake also forms part of the water storages for the Wivenhoe Power Station.

== Location and features ==
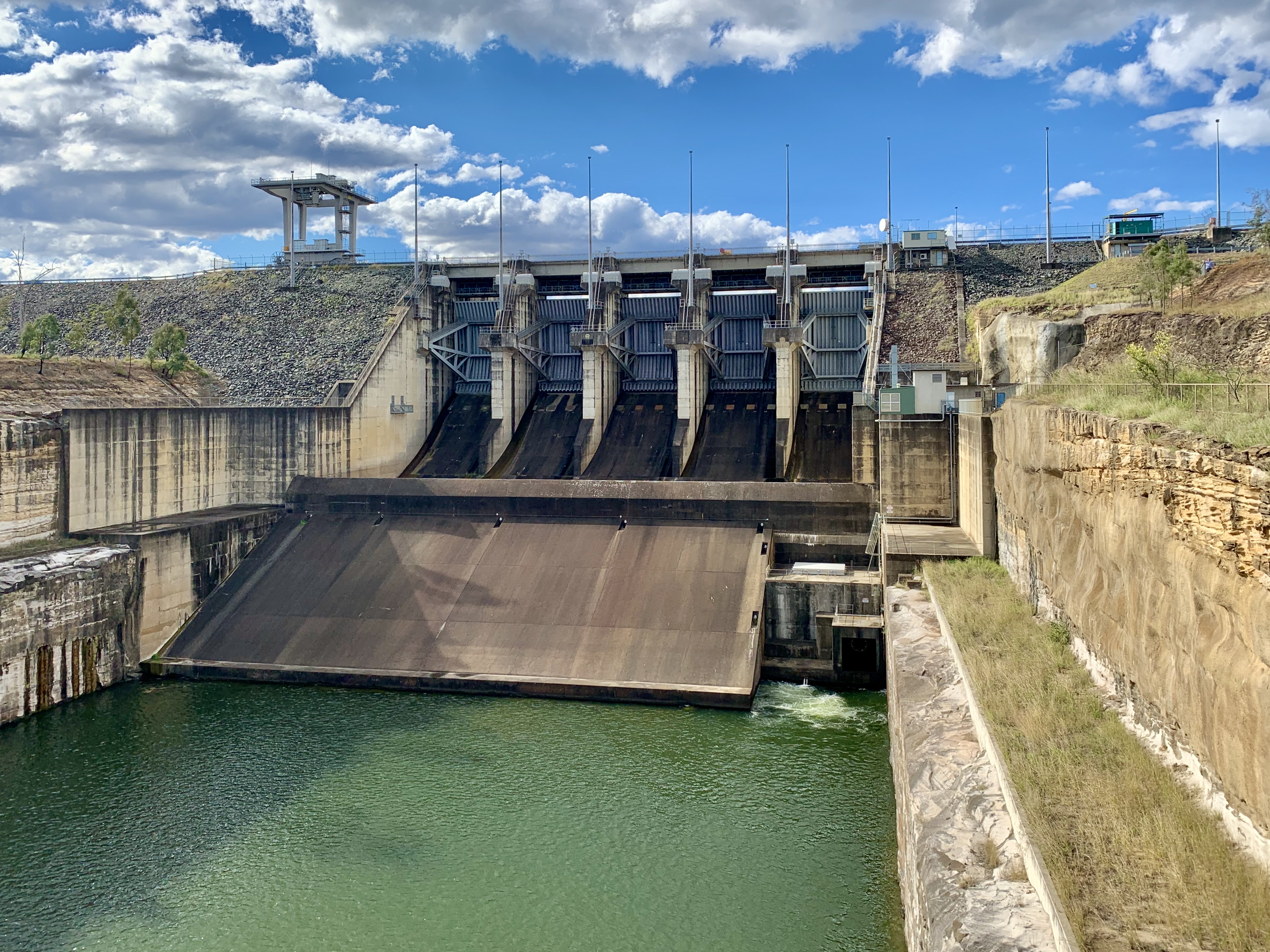
Dam and spillway, August 2020

The earth and rock dam structure is 59 metres (194 ft) high and 2,300 metres (7,500 ft) long. The 4,140-thousand-cubic-metre (146×10^{6} cu ft) dam wall holds back the 1,165,000-megalitre (256×10^{9} imp gal; 308×10^{9} US gal) reservoir when at full capacity. From a catchment area of 7,020 square kilometres (2,710 sq mi) that includes much of the south–western slopes of the D'Aguilar National Park, the dam creates Lake Wivenhoe, with a surface area of 1,094 hectares (2,700 acres), a maximum shoreline of 462 kilometres (287 mi), and an average annual evaporation level of 1,872 mm (73.7 in). The gated spillway, with five steel crest gates that are 12 metres (39 ft) wide and 16.6 metres (54 ft) high, has a discharge capacity of 12,000 cubic metres per second (420,000 cu ft/s). The dam also has an auxiliary spillway to stop over-topping. The dam is managed by SEQ Water since July 2008 when most dam assets were transferred to the statutory authority, as part of a water security project in the South East Queensland region, known as the South East Queensland Water Grid.

=== Construction ===
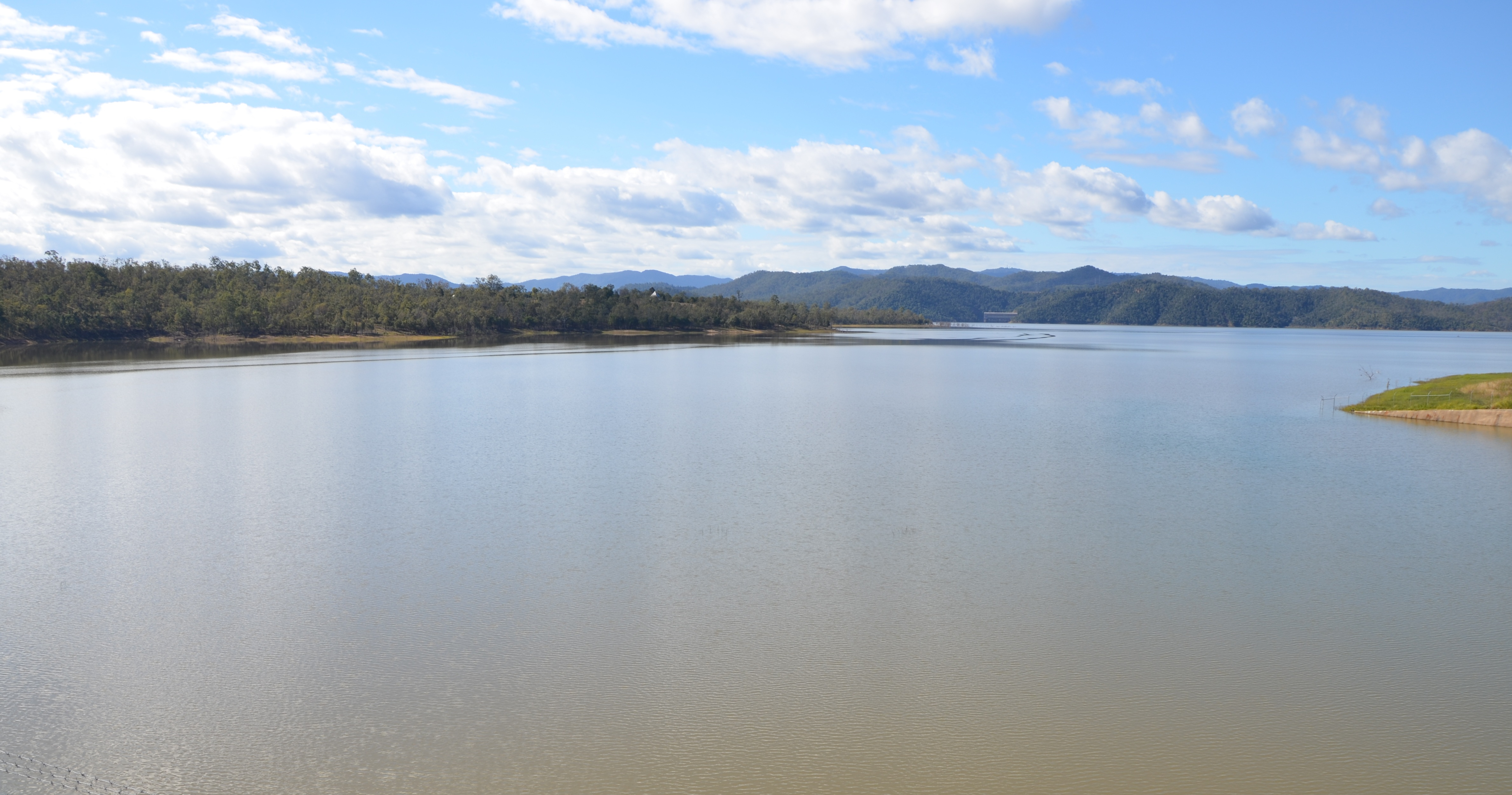
A view of Lake Wivenhoe

Wivenhoe was initially investigated for a dam site in the 1890s and again in 1933. Further investigations into a dam began in the mid 1960s. In November 1971, Government approval was given to proceed with construction. Acquisition of lands of the submerged portion of the dam began in March 1973. In 1976, the Government gave approval to proceed with construction of the pumped storage hydro-electric scheme. Total cost for the hydro-electric project was A$450 million. In March 1977, the first construction contract was awarded. The dam was designed by the Queensland Water Resources Commission.

In June 1983, the partially completed dam mitigated a potentially severe flood that may have caused damage equal to the 1893 Brisbane flood. Construction work, carried out by Thiess Brothers, was complete by 1985. To provide the 337.5 square kilometres (130.3 sq mi) of land required for the dam, 200 properties were acquired. The catchment area has an average annual rainfall of 940 millimetres (37 in). The dam holds twice as much water as Sydney Harbour and can hold about seven times more water than the Hinze Dam on the Gold Coast. Wivenhoe Dam contributes to the Gold Coast's water supply.

=== Purpose ===
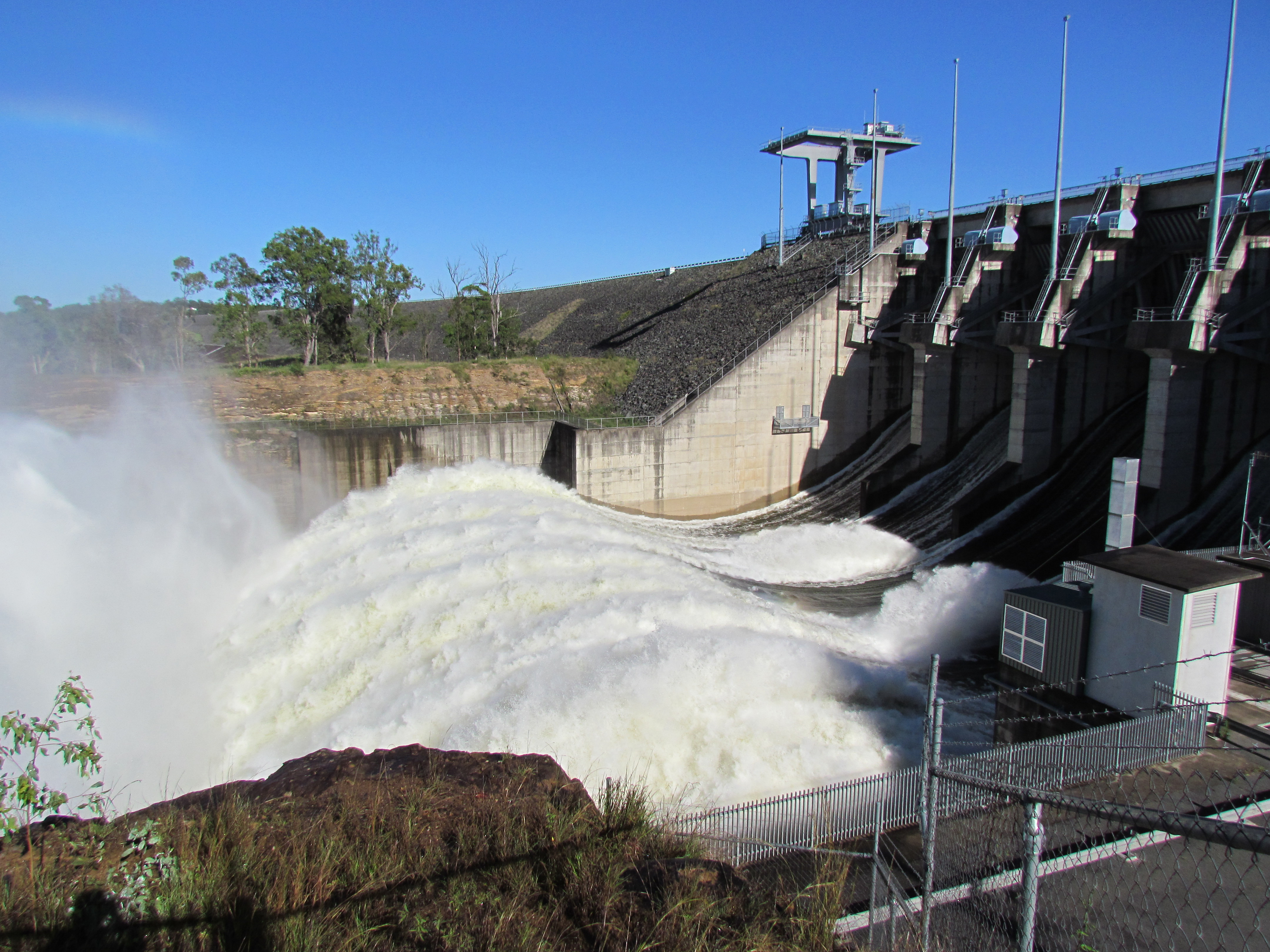
The dam is used to mitigate floods and provide drinking water

The dam was designed as a response to the floods that damaged Brisbane in 1974. Built in the late 1970s – early 1980s as a multifunction facility by a consortium of construction companies including Thiess Brothers, Wivenhoe Dam provides a safe water supply to the people of Brisbane and adjacent regions. Additionally, Wivenhoe Dam serves as the lower storage in a pumped-storage, hydro-electric generating facility, the Wivenhoe Power Station. The upper reservoir is formed by Splityard Creek Dam, of earth and rock construction, with a capacity of 28,700 megalitres (6,300,000×10^{3} imp gal; 7,600,000×10^{3} US gal). Under normal conditions the dam supplies water via pipeline to both Tarong Power Station and Tarong North Power Station, but during drought conditions only supplies water to Tarong North.

==== Flood mitigation ====
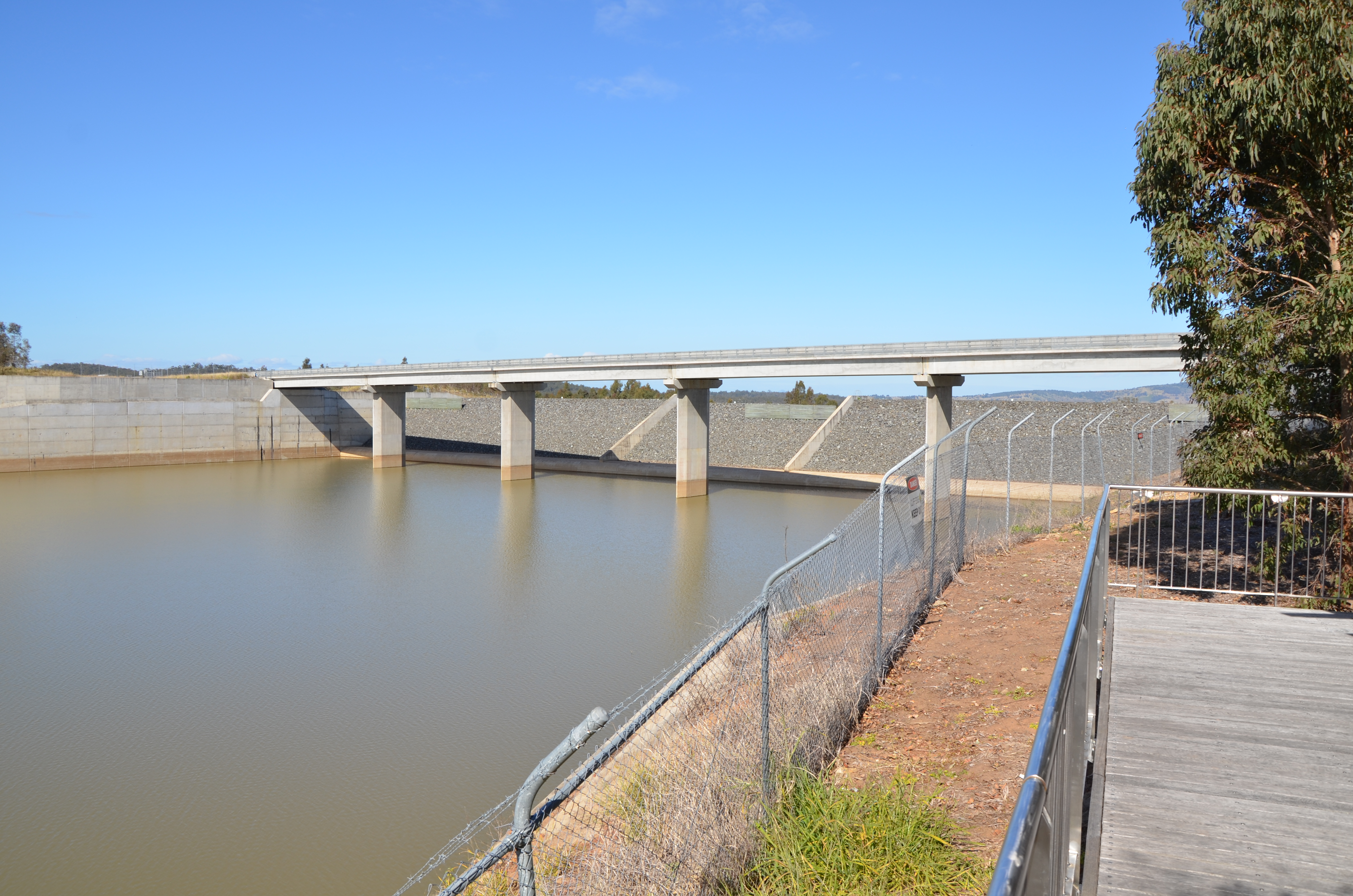
Auxiliary spillway, upstream side

During a flood the dam is designed to hold back 1.967 million megalitres (433,000×10^{6} imp gal; 520,000×10^{6} US gal) of additional water for flood mitigation or 225% capacity. Under the water release plan which is defined by law, excess water must be released from the dam within seven days or a week of it reaching 100% capacity. In February 1999, the level reached 135% of full capacity. Between April 2004 and September 2008, a 165-metre (541 ft) wide auxiliary spillway with a three-bay fuse plug was installed on the western portion of the dam to further mitigate flooding. In 2007, a feasibility study concluded that Wivenhoe Dam failed to satisfy the Australian National Committee on Large Dams (ANCOLD) guidelines on acceptable flood capacity.

==== 2000–2007 drought ====
Brisbane water levels reduced to under 20% of capacity, having had no substantial inflow for five years.

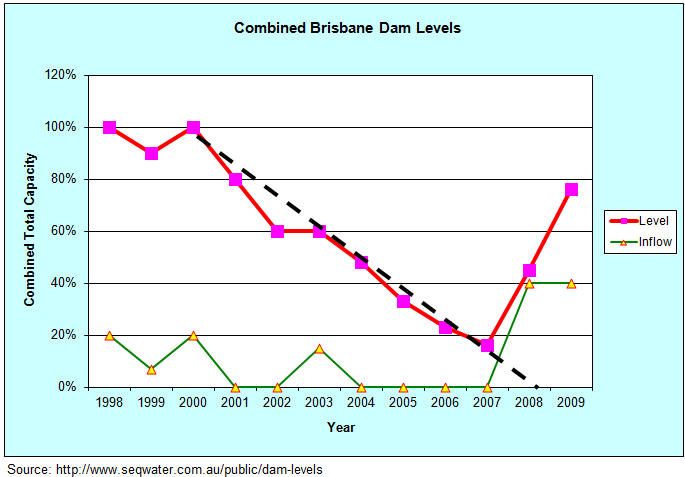

===== 2011 Queensland floods =====
The largest ever recorded inflows for the dam occurred in January 2011. On 11 January 2011, Wivenhoe Dam reached its highest level ever, 191% of normal water supply storage capacity, as it held back floodwater. Because it is an embankment dam, it was not designed to spill over its crest or overtop and there is a risk that if waters spilled over the crest, this could erode the dam wall and potentially cause the dam to fail. In this scenario the water level would need to rise to 225% capacity. To prevent this, the dam was designed and built to include a second emergency spillway. During the peak of the flooding event the dam water level reached 60 centimetres (24 in) below the auxiliary spillway height.

===== 2022 eastern Australia floods =====
On 27 February 2022 the dam reached 180% of capacity.

=== Recycled water ===
Spillway with all five gates open in October 2010

In 2006, emergency plans for placing fully treated recycled water from the Western Corridor Recycled Water Scheme into the dam to supplement supply were made public. Sixty million litres of recycled water were to be pumped into the dam by early 2009. Increasing rainfall from 2008 resulted in the plan for recycled water to enter the region's drinking water supply to be postponed.

=== Recreation ===
Lake Wivenhoe is also a camping and outdoor recreation destination. Camping sites are provided at Captain Logan and Lumley Hill Areas. The managed camping facilities at Captain Logan Camp include hot showers, barbecues and toilets, and are adjacent to playgrounds and a boat ramp at Logan Inlet. Cormorant Bay, Hamon Cove and Spillway Common also have facilities for picnic.

A stocked impoundment permit is required to fish in the dam. Swimming is permitted and camp sites have been established. Electric and non-powered boating with a permit is allowed, but domestic animals are banned.

==== Fauna ====
The dam is home to the endangered Australian lungfish. Anne Kemp, a researcher from the University of Queensland, estimates there was a population of 800 in 2010 but many are swept out of the dam when the spillway is opened and that their food source of molluscs and clams is insufficient to maintain the lungfish in the dam.

Self-sustaining populations of lungfish have lived in dams in South East Queensland for over 100 years since 1896. Lungfish were originally restricted to the Mary and Burnett river systems but due to perceived threats to their survival they were introduced to other rivers and dams, including the Brisbane River, in 1895–1896. This was done to improve the viability of the species.

Land around the dam has been the location for a tree planting program in order to provide koala habitat. Planting will occur between 2020 and 2025.

== See also ==
- Bridges over the Brisbane River
- List of dams in Queensland
