= Esk, Queensland =

Esk
- Town
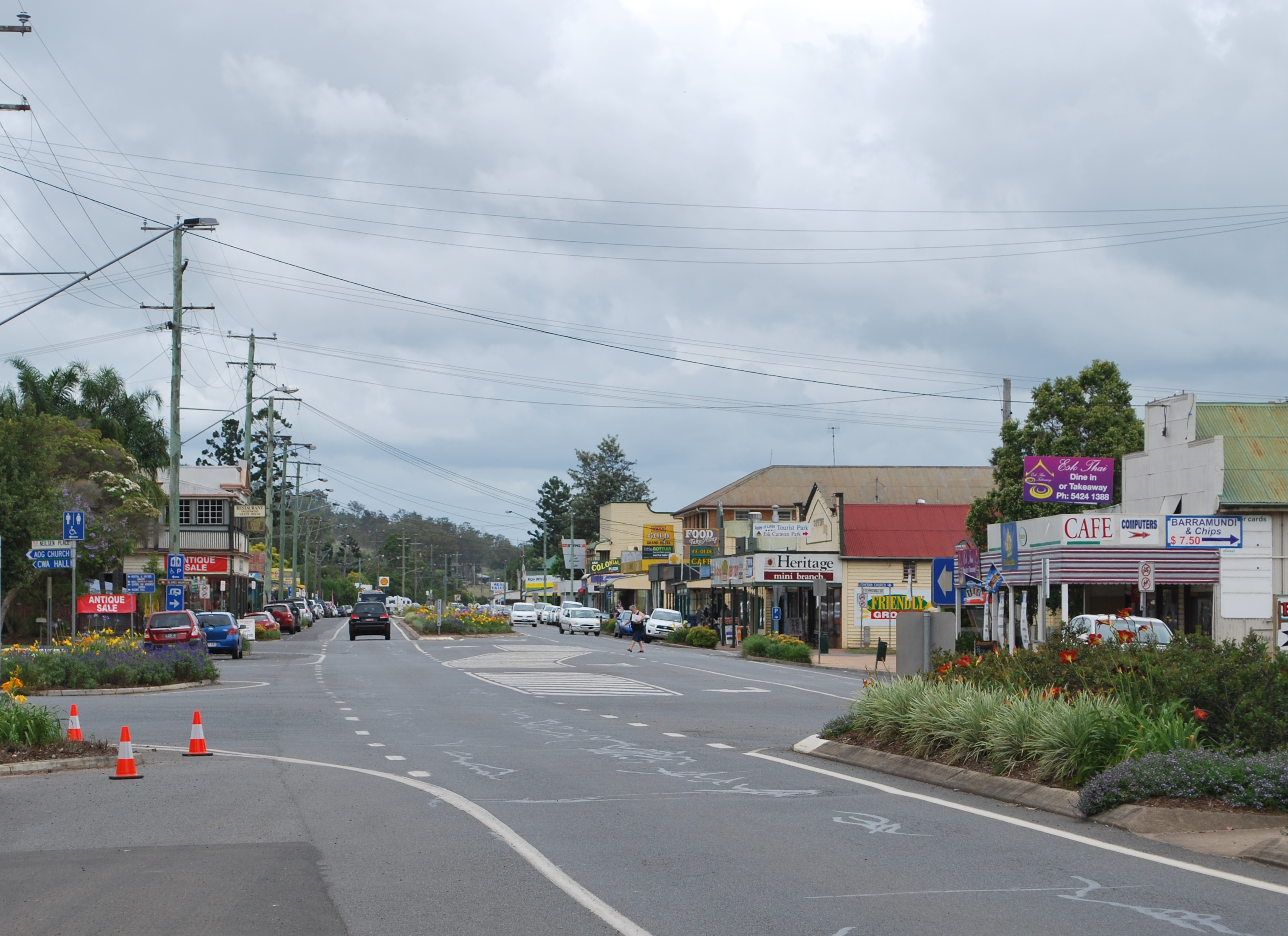
- Main street of Esk, the Brisbane Valley Highway

- Interactive map of Esk
- Coordinates: 27.2394°S 152.4197°E
- Country: Australia
- State: Queensland
- LGA: Somerset Region
- Location: 18.3 km (11.4 mi) S of Toogoolawah; 64.1 km (39.8 mi) NNW of Ipswich; 98.2 km (61.0 mi) NW of Brisbane
- Established: 1872

Government
  - State electorate: Nanango
  - Federal division: Blair

Area
  - Total: 59.6 km^{2} (23.0 sq mi)

Population
  - Total: 1,641 (2021 census)
  - Density: 27.534/km^{2} (71.31/sq mi)
- Time zone: UTC+10:00 (AEST)
- Postcode: 4312
- County: Cavendish
- Parish: Esk
Localities around Esk
Biarra	Coal Creek	Murrumba
Redbank Creek	Esk	Glen Esk
Mount Hallen	Mount Hallen	Moombra

Esk is a rural town and locality in the Somerset Region in South East Queensland, Australia. In the 2021 census, the locality of Esk had a population of 1,641. It is the administrative centre of the Somerset Region.

== Geography ==
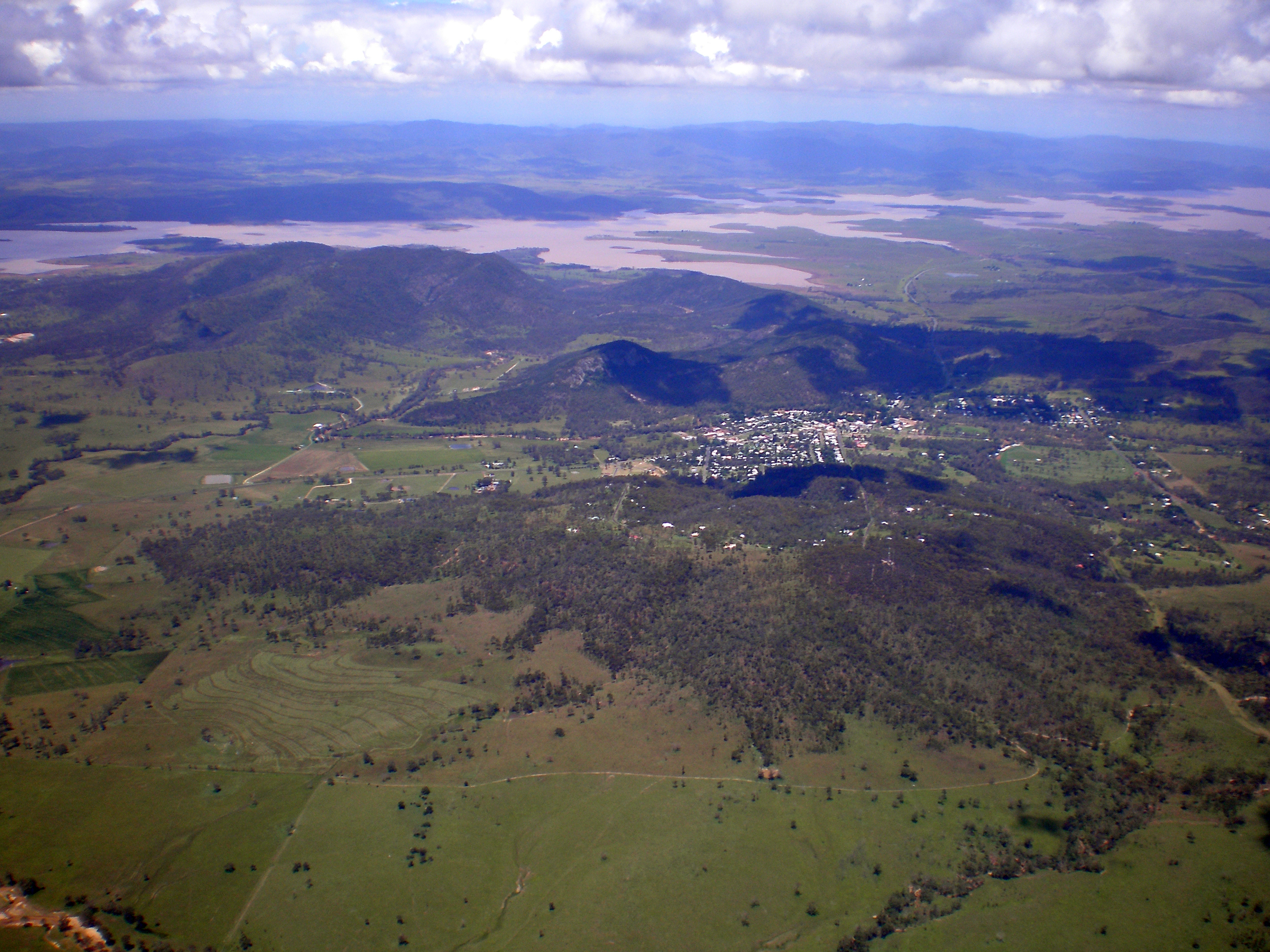
Aerial view of Esk with flooded Wivenhoe Dam in the background, photographed a week after the devastating floods of January 2011

Esk is approximately 64 kilometres (40 mi) northwest of Ipswich on the Brisbane Valley Highway. It was named after the River Esk in Scotland and England. It is the administrative centre of the Somerset Region.

The town of Esk is contained in the Queensland electoral district of Nanango.

== History ==
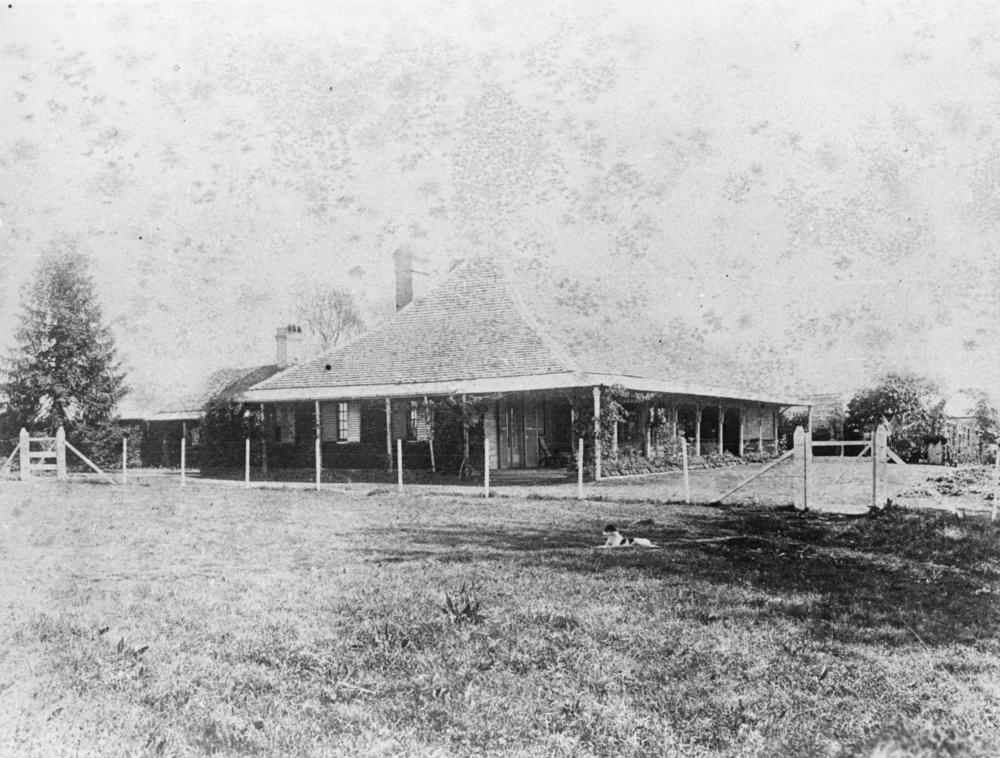
View across the grass to Cressbrook Homestead, circa 1887

Jagara (also known as Jagera, Yagara, Yugarabul, Yuggera and Yuggerabul) is one of the Aboriginal languages of South-East Queensland. There is some uncertainty over the status of Jagara as a language, dialect or perhaps a group or clan within the local government boundaries of Ipswich City Council, Lockyer Regional Council and the Somerset Regional Council.

Esk formed part of the southern border of the Garumga clan of the Dalla tribe.

The land around Esk was first explored by Captain Patrick Logan in 1830. The town was established to service the short-lived copper mines of Eskdale and Cressbrook Creek. Settlers moved into the region during the 1840s.

Mount Esk Post Office opened on 1 February 1874 (a receiving office had been open from 1873) and was renamed Esk by February 1881.

Mount Esk State School was opened on 1 November 1875 and was renamed Esk State School in 1887.

On Sunday 25 November 1883, the Esk Primitive Methodist Church was opened with services conducted by the Reverend Willian Little. It was a timber church, 18 by 30 feet (5.5 by 9.1 m). It became the Esk Methodist Church after the amalgamation of Methodist denominations in 1902. A new church was constructed in 1907.

In 1886, the Brisbane Valley railway line reached Esk from Lowood. Several sawmills were built and in 1904 a butter factory opened. The timber industry declined in the 1920s.

St Agnes' Anglican Church was dedicated on Monday 28 October 1889 by Bishop William Webber.

On 30 November 1920, Dr Graham Butler laid the foundation stone of the Esk War Memorial. The finished memorial was unveiled by General Lachlan Chisholm Wilson on 27 August 1921. The memorial records the names of 462 Shire residents who enlisted during the First World War. It also contains bronze honour rolls bearing the names of 83 local men who died during the war. Four commemorative plaques have subsequently been added to the structure. The war memorial stands in Esk Memorial Park, which also contains a memorial to Captain Logan, who was murdered while exploring the Brisbane Valley in 1830.

In July 1941, a Lutheran church was opened.

Dairying slowed from the 1960s onwards, which has eventually led to the decline of the town's importance as a major rural centre.

The Esk Library opened in 2009.

The Caboonbah Homestead was destroyed by fire on 10 May 2009.

During the 2010–11 Queensland floods, the centre of Esk was flooded when Redbank Creek burst its banks for the first time in recorded history.

== Demographics ==
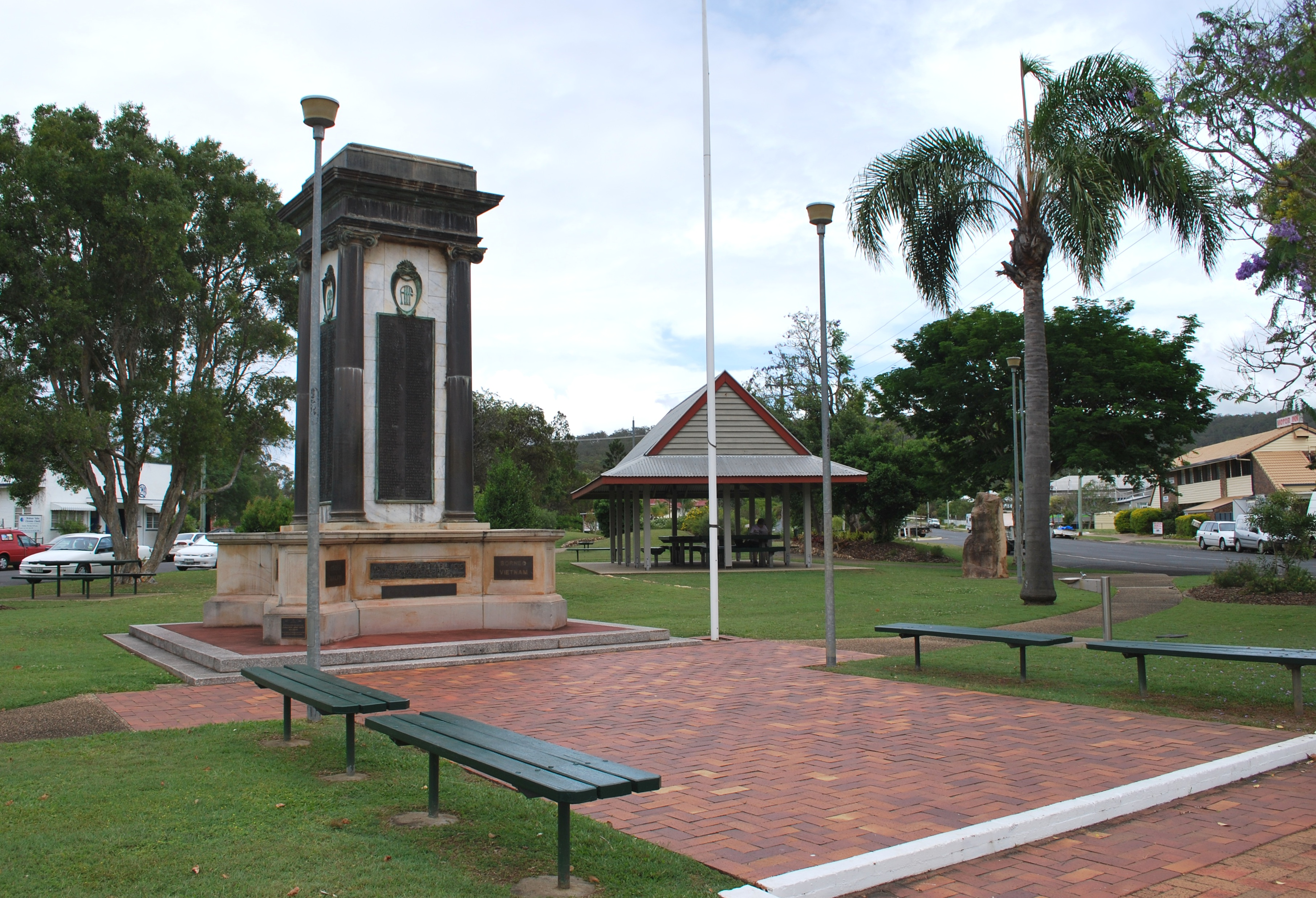
War Memorial and War Memorial Park, 2010

In the 2006 census, the town of Esk had a population of 1,166 people.

In the 2011 census, the location of Esk had a population of 1,755 people.

In the 2016 census, the locality of Esk had a population of 1,698 people.

In the 2021 census, the locality of Esk had a population of 1,641 people.

== Heritage listings ==
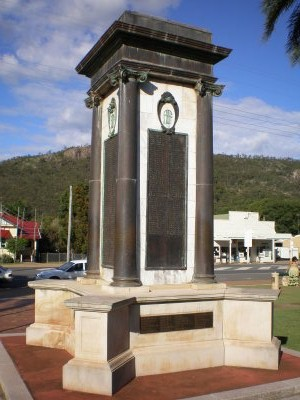
War memorial

Esk has a number of heritage-listed sites, including:

- Esk War Memorial, Ipswich Street (27.2401°S 152.4214°E):
- St Agnes Anglican Church and Rectory, Ipswich Street
- St Andrews Presbyterian Church, Ipswich Street

== Education ==
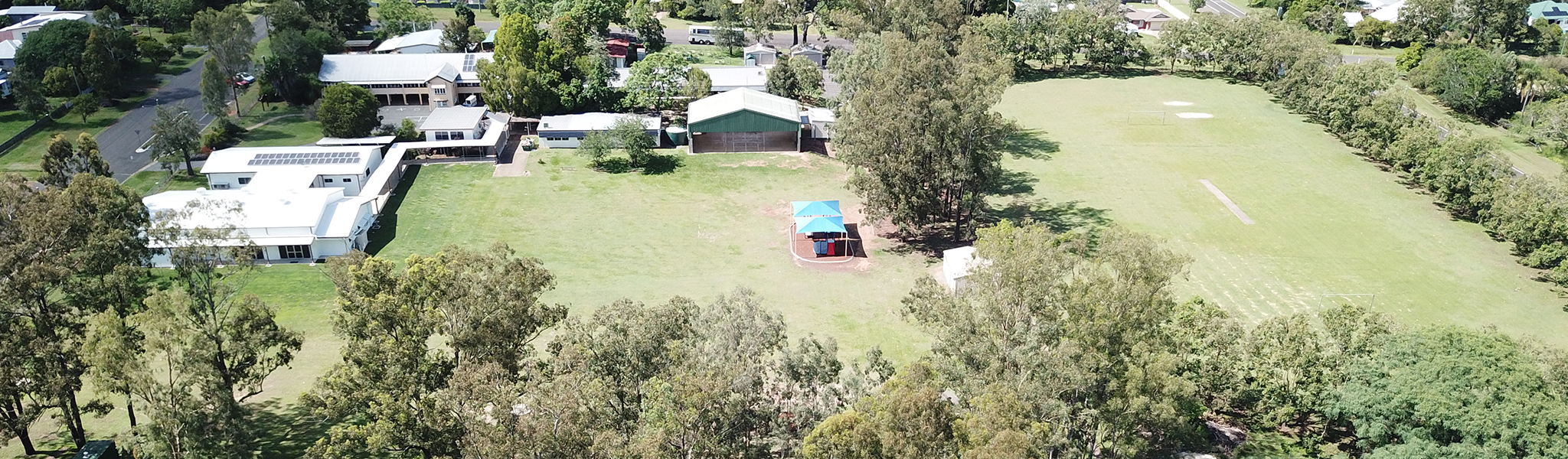
Esk State School, 2023

Esk State School is a government primary (Prep–6) school for boys and girls at 49 East Street (27.2475°S 152.4263°E). In 2017, the school had an enrolment of 172 students with 15 teachers (13 full-time equivalent) and 9 non-teaching staff (6 full-time equivalent).

There are no secondary schools in Esk. The nearest government secondary school is Toogoolawah State High School in Toogoolawah to the north. Other government secondary schools in the area are Lockyer District High School in Gatton and Lowood State High School in Lowood.

== Amenities ==
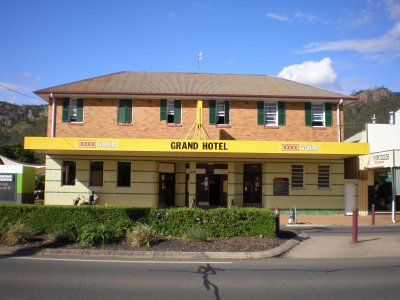
Grand Hotel, Esk

The Somerset Regional Council operates a public library at 19 Heap Street.

The Esk branch of the Queensland Country Women's Association meets at 5 Heap Street.

Esk Uniting Church is at 78 Ipswich Street (27.2421°S 152.4234°E). It is part of the Brisbane Valley Uniting Church.

Esk Post Office is at 97 Ipswich Street (27.2398°S 152.4219°E).

== Attractions ==
Nearby attractions include Lake Somerset and Lake Wivenhoe, both lakes created by dams which provide a number of camping areas with facilities and opportunities for water-based recreational activities including boating, canoeing, fishing and skiing and Ravensbourne and Crows Nest National Parks.

The historic Bellevue Homestead is located in the area. Also close by are the peaks Glen Rock and Mount Esk.

== Notable people from Esk ==
- Douglas Berry (1907–1957), butcher and Liberal MP in the 1950s
- Roderic Dallas (1891–1918), First World War fighter ace
- The Kransky Sisters, a comedy musical trio who claim to be "from Esk, in Queensland" before every show
- Henry Newton (bishop) (1866–1947), Anglican colonial bishop
