= Darling Downs =

- Region
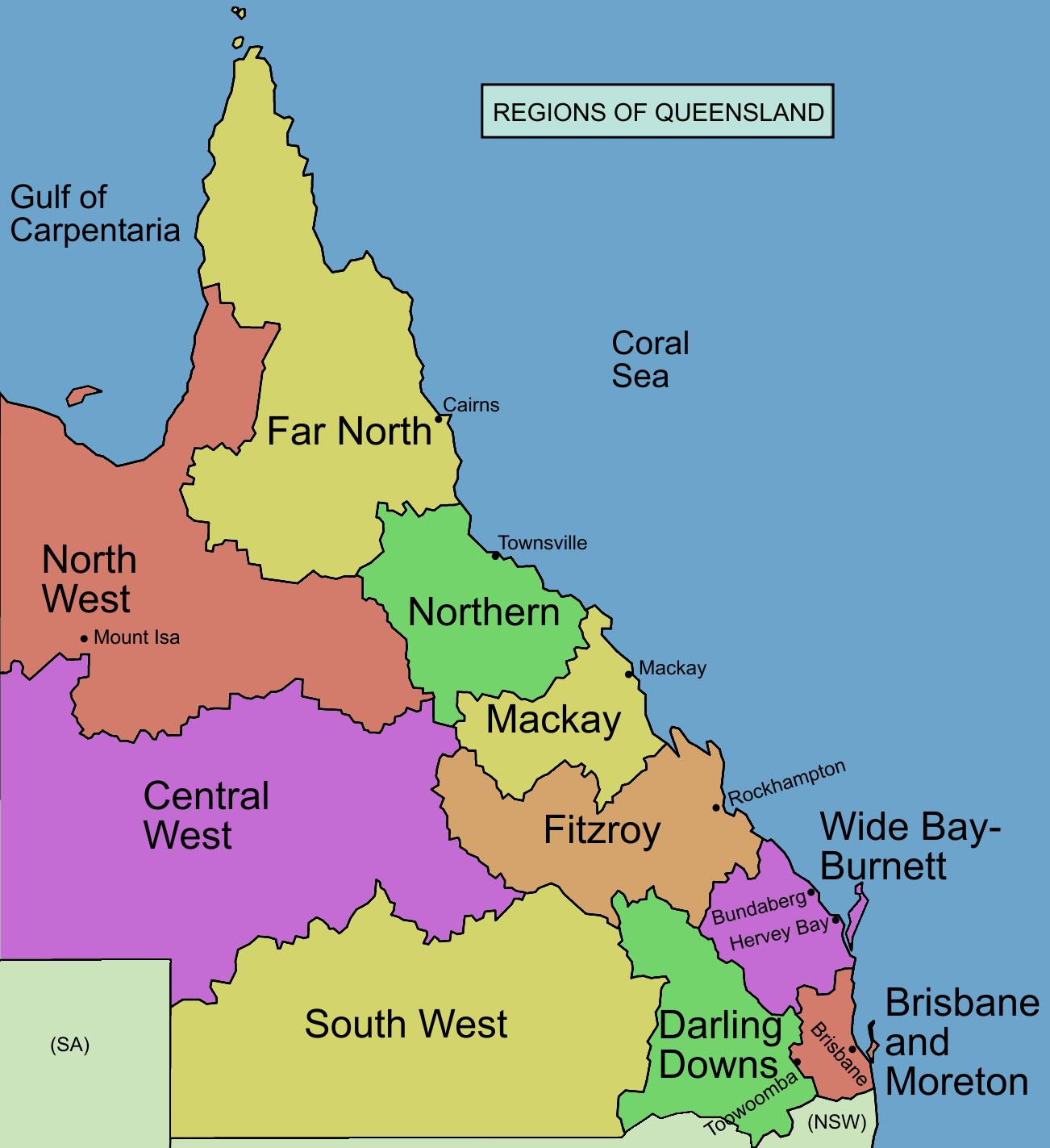

- Country: Australia
- State: Queensland
- LGA: Goondiwindi, Southern Downs, Toowoomba, Western Downs
- Established: 1840

Government
  - State electorate: Condamine, Nanango, Southern Downs, Toowoomba North, Toowoomba South, Warrego
  - Federal division: Groom, Maranoa

Area
  - Total: 77,388.7 km^{2} (29,879.9 sq mi)

Population
  - Total: 241,537 (2010)
  - Density: 3.121089/km^{2} (8.083583/sq mi)
Regions around Darling Downs
South West Queensland	Central Queensland	Wide Bay–Burnett
South West Queensland	Darling Downs	South East Queensland
New South Wales	New South Wales	New South Wales

The Darling Downs is a farming region on the western slopes of the Great Dividing Range in southern Queensland, Australia. The Downs are to the west of South East Queensland and are one of the major regions of Queensland. The name was generally applied to an area approximating to that of the Condamine River catchment upstream of Condamine township but is now applied to a wider region comprising the Southern Downs, Western Downs, Toowoomba and Goondiwindi local authority areas. The name Darling Downs was given in 1827 by Allan Cunningham, the first European explorer to reach the area and recognises the then Governor of New South Wales, Ralph Darling.

The region has developed a strong and diverse agricultural industry largely due to the extensive areas of vertosols (cracking clay soils), particularly black vertosols, of moderate to high fertility and available water capacity. Manufacturing and mining, particularly coal mining are also important, and coal seam gas extraction experienced significant growth in the decade up to 2016.

The landscape is dominated by rolling hills covered by pastures of many different species, vegetables, legumes such as soy beans and chick peas, and other crops including cotton, wheat, barley and sorghum. Between the farmlands there are long stretches of crisscrossing roads, bushy ridges, winding creeks and herds of cattle. There are farms with beef and dairy cattle, pigs, sheep and lamb stock. Other typical sights include irrigation systems, windmills serving as water well pumps to get water from the Great Artesian Basin, light planes crop-dusting, rusty old woolsheds and other scattered remnants from a bygone era of early exploration and settlement.

The region is recognised as a cultural icon on the list of Queensland's Q150 icons.

== History ==
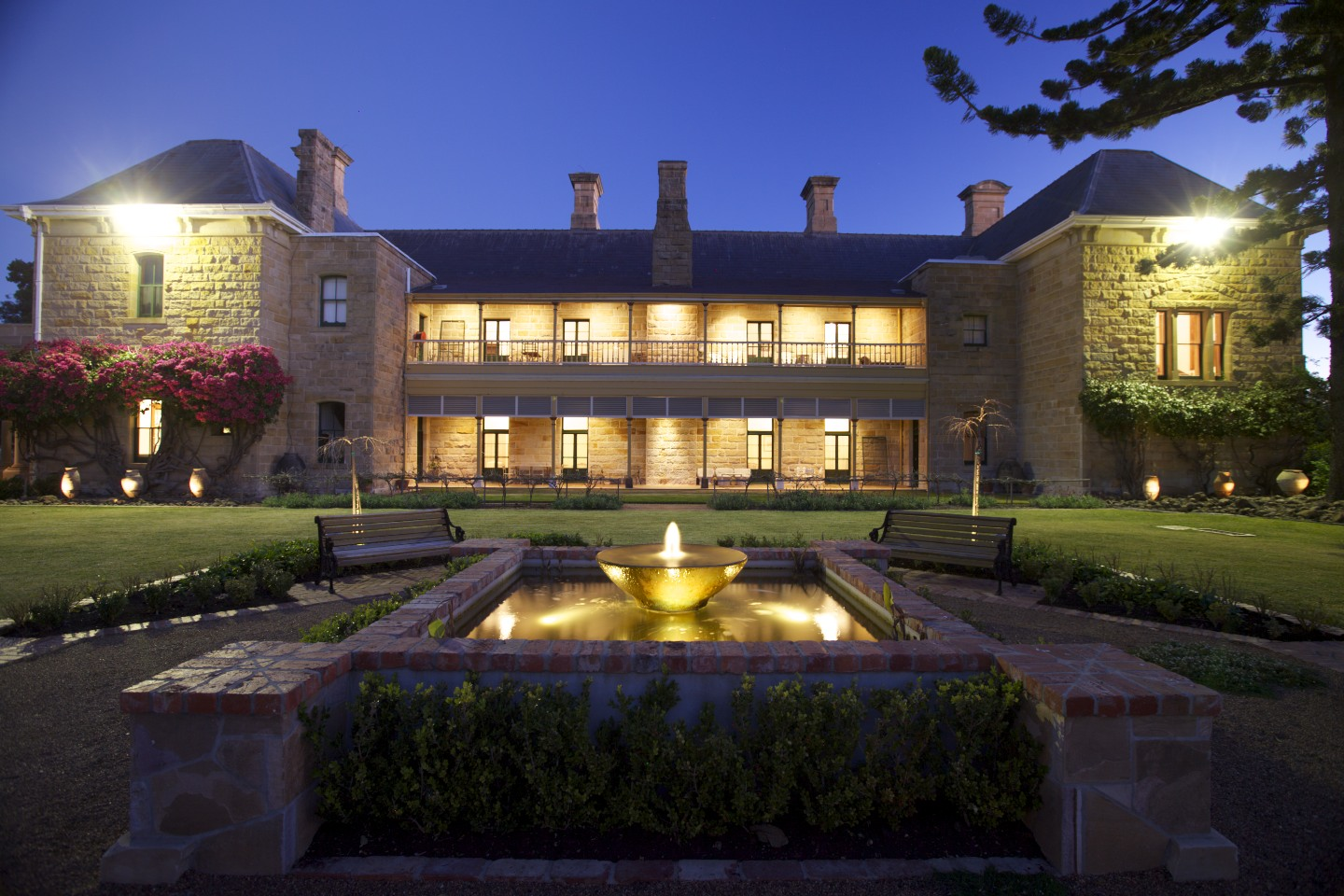
Jimbour House, 2011

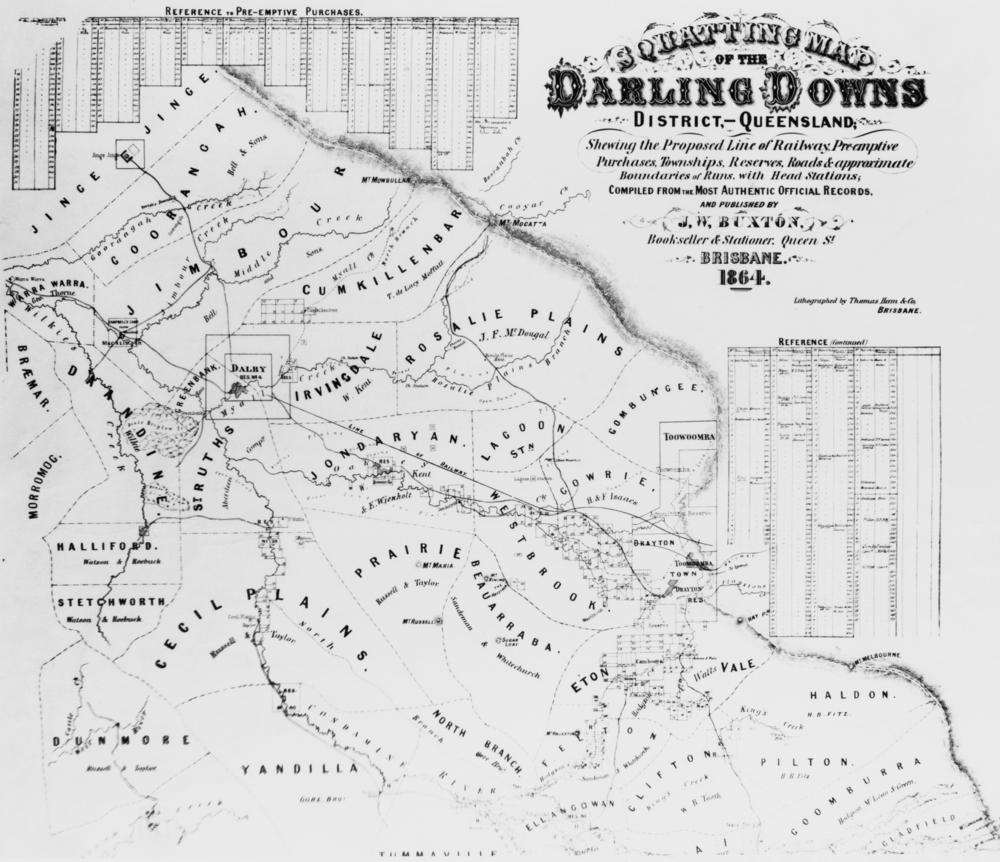
Squatting map of the Darling Downs district, 1864

Baranggum (also known as Barrunggam, Barunggam Parrungoom, Murrumgama) is an Australian Aboriginal language spoken by the Baranggum people. The Baranggum language region includes the landscape within the local government boundaries of the Western Downs Regional Council, particularly Dalby, Tara, Jandowae and west towards Chinchilla.

Originally, the Darling Downs was covered with a wealth of indigenous grasses which created an ideal verdure for stock eight months of the year. The Darling Downs Aboriginals had an annual burning season at the time when the indigenous grasses were ripe and dry. The annual fires gave the local Aboriginals of the Darling Downs the name "or "Fire Blacks" – "goonnee" being a name for fire and "burra" a generic word the Moreton Bay area. Murri is a wider-spread generic word meaning the whole race but in the Kamabroi dialect. The Downs tribes spoke one common dialect, called Waccah and so to all other surrounding tribes were known as the Wacca-burra. The Goonnee-burra were once situated where Warwick stands today. Goonnee meant "the ones who hunt with fire".

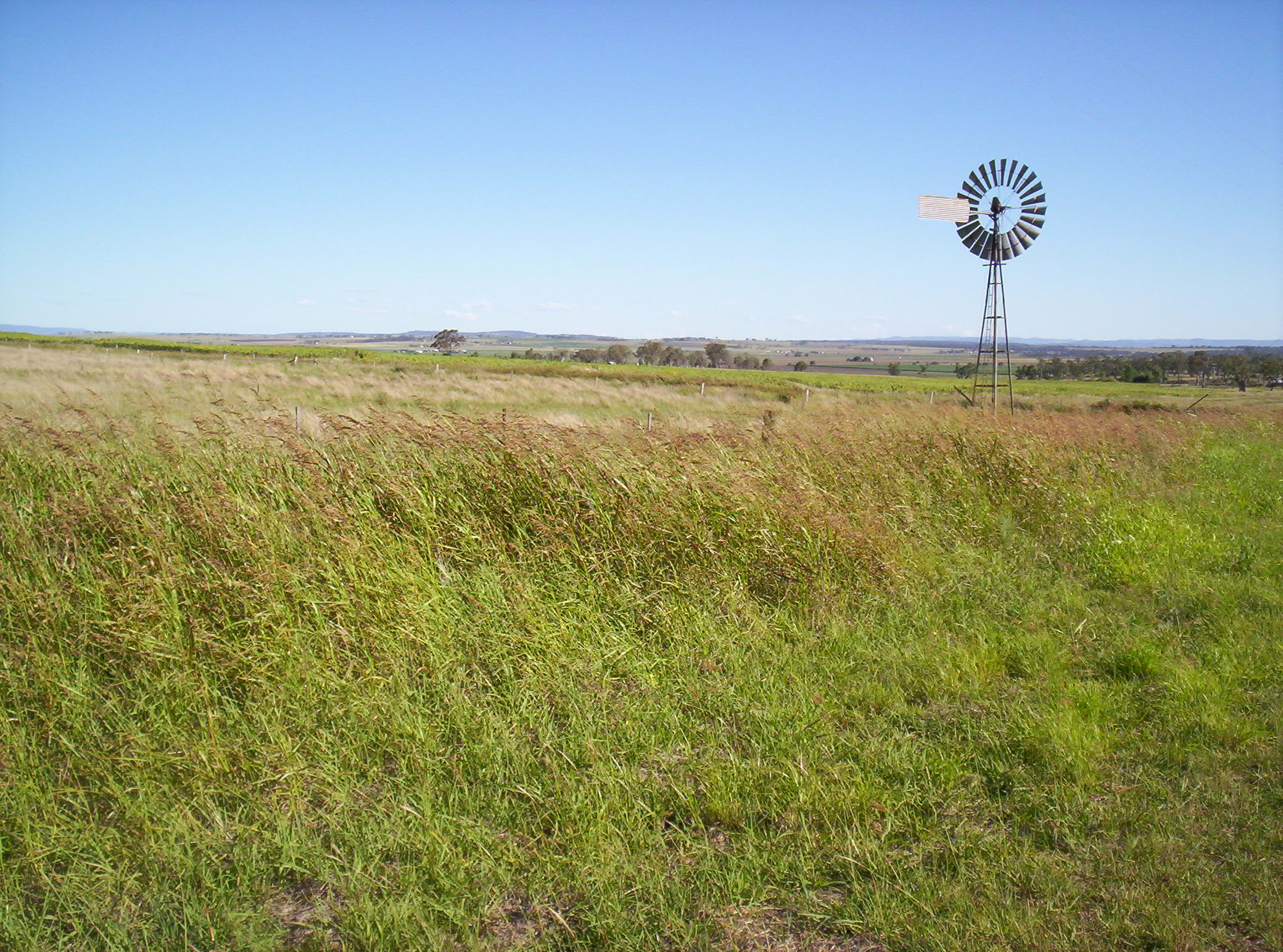
Windmill on the Darling Downs, Queensland

1883 map of the Darling Downs showing pastoral runs

Allan Cunningham set out to explore the area to the west of Moreton Bay in 1827, crossing to the west of the Great Dividing Range from the Hunter Region and travelling north. In June 1827, Cunningham climbed to the top of Mount Dumaresque (near what is now Clintonvale close to Maryvale) and after wrote in his diary that this lush area was ideal for settlement. Exploring around Mount Dumaresque, Cunningham found a pass, now known as Cunninghams Gap. Cunningham returned to Moreton Bay in 1828 and with Charles Fraser charted the route through the pass to the Darling Downs. Ludwig Leichhardt in 1844 saw the remains of a camp showing the signs of white men through ridge poles and steel axes.

News of the lush pastures quickly spread resulting in a land grab that authorities in the distant New South Wales colony found difficult to stop. Patrick Leslie was the first European person to settle on the Darling Downs in 1840, establishing a sheep property at Canning Downs on the Condamine River in 1846. Other well-established residences on the southern downs include Glengallan Homestead, Talgai Homestead, Pringle Cottage and Rosenthal Homestead. One of the first stations to be established was Jimbour House. It was also the point where Leichhardt launched his expedition to the Northern Territory in 1844.

Railway lines on the Darling Downs
From	To	Line	Opened	Closed
Toowoomba	Dalby	Western	1868	–
Toowoomba	Warwick	Southern	1871	–
Toowoomba	Miles	Western	1878	–
Warwick	Stanthorpe	Southern	1881	–
Toowoomba	Cabarlah	Crows Nest	1883	1961
Warwick	Killarney	Killarney	1885	1964
Toowoomba	Crows Nest	Crows Nest	1886	1961
Warwick	Allora	Goomburra	1897	1995
Hendon	Goomburra	Goomburra	1897	1995
Wyreema	Millmerran	Millmerran	1897	–
Warwick	Goondiwindi	South Western	1904	–
Dalby	Bell	Bell	1906	1972
Kingsthorpe	Haden	Haden	1910	1964
Dalby	Tara	Glenmorgan	1911	–
Warwick	Maryvale	Maryvale	1911	1960
Oakey	Cooyar	Cooyar	1913	1969
Miles	Wandoan	Wandoan	1913	–
Dalby	Jandowae	Jandowae	1914	2013
Oakey	Cecil Plains	Cecil Plains	1915	1984
Cottonvale	Amiens	Amiens	1920	1974

By 1844, there were 26 properties including a number of sheep stations with more than 150,000 head. Local aboriginals and European squatters co-settled the area from the late 1840s onwards. Darling Downs then became known as the 'jewel in the diadem of squatterdom' with an elite 'pure merino' class living in comfortable houses. Sheep grazing was the dominant land-use on the Darling Downs for a century. More recently a shift to cultivation and cattle raising has occurred.

In 1854, Charles Douglas Eastaughffe settled in the area. Spicers Gap Road opened up the area in the 1850s. Later the expansion of Queensland Rail's train networks and Cobb and Co's stagecoach transport greatly assisted access to the region. Gold was found in the district around this time, however it was agricultural activity that provided for the boom times ahead.

The 1891 Australian shearers' strike started at Jondaryan. The Darling Downs experienced a water crisis as the Condamine River dried up during the severe drought of 1994/1995.

During the early 20th century dairy was a significant industry for Queensland. The 1930s saw the peaking of the dairy industry on the Downs with 6,500 farms and over 200,000 milking cows. The Downs Co-operative Dairy Association expanded, constructed or purchased at least 10 butter and cheese factories across the Darling Downs. The Downs Co-operative Dairy Association Limited Factory in Toowoomba closed in 2006.

In 2010, the population of the Darling Downs was estimated to be 241,537 people.

In 2022, the Wieambilla police shootings took place.

== Geography ==
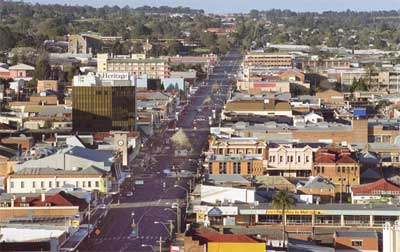
The central business district of the region's largest city, Toowoomba

The largest city and commercial centre of the Darling Downs is Toowoomba about 132 kilometres (82 mi) west of Brisbane. Other towns situated on what is now called The Downs include Dalby, Warwick, Stanthorpe, Wallangarra, Goondiwindi, Oakey, Miles, Pittsworth, Allora, Clifton, Cecil Plains, Drayton, Millmerran, Nobby, and Chinchilla. The New England Highway, Gore Highway and the Warrego Highway traverse the region. The Toowoomba Second Range Crossing has been constructed so that heavy traffic can avoid passing through Toowoomba. Coolmunda Dam, Leslie Dam, Cooby Dam, Perseverance Dam, Cressbrook Dam, Storm King Dam and the Glenlyon Dam are some of the major water storage facilities in the area. West of Toowoomba is the Toowoomba Wellcamp Airport.

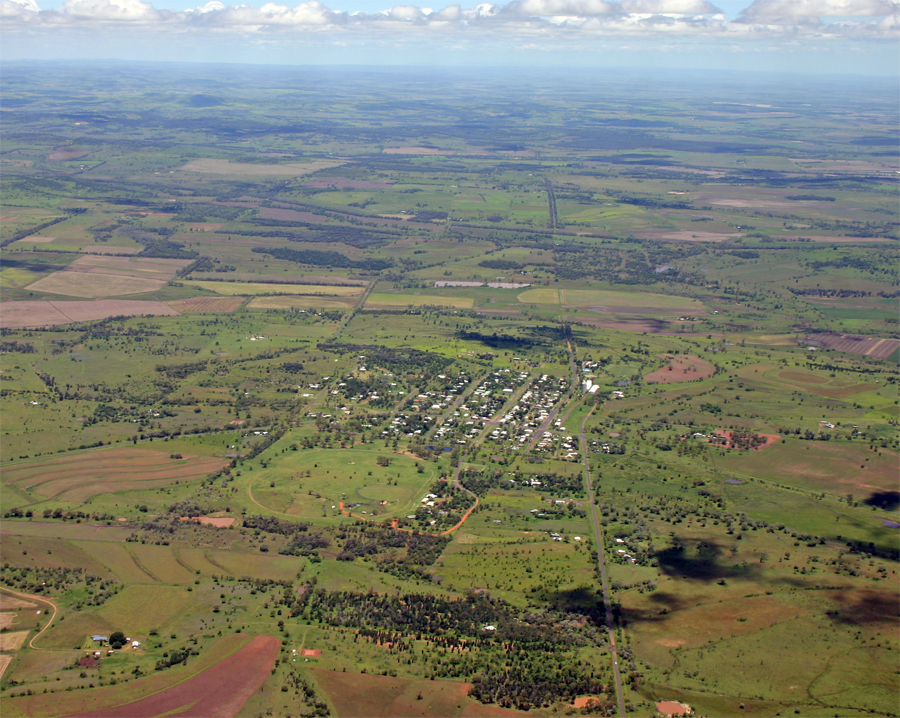
Aerial view of Bell, 2010

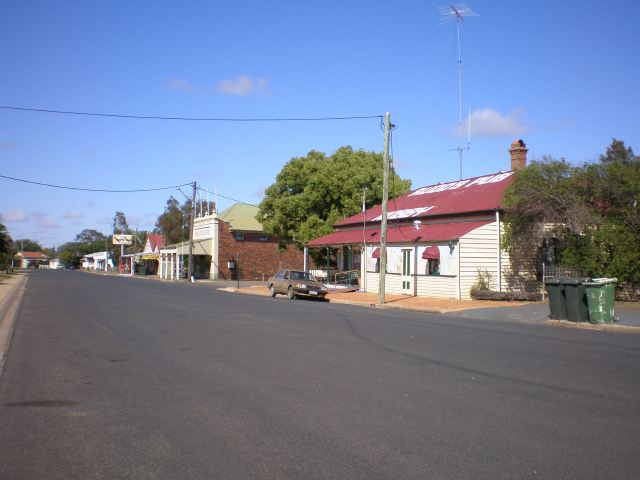
A wide street in the small town of Nobby

The Darling Down is situated in the drainage basins of the Condamine River and Maranoa River and tributaries. The Condamine River flood plain is noted for its good soils formed by basaltic alluvium. On the northern boundaries of the Downs are the Bunya Mountains and the Bunya Mountains National Park. The region to the north is the South Burnett and the Maranoa lies to the west. A section of the western downs lies over coal deposits of the Surat Basin. Towards the coast, the mountains of the Scenic Rim form the headwaters of the westward flowing Condamine.

=== Climate ===
The majority of the Darling Downs has a humid subtropical climate although some areas experience a semi-arid or subtropical highland climate. Summer maximum temperatures range from 28 to 34 °C (82 to 93 °F), while winter maximums range from 13 to 19 °C (55 to 66 °F). The annual rainfall ranges from 600 mm (24 in) in the far west of the region, to 1,000 mm (39 in) in the east. In the south-east of the Darling Downs winter temperatures can drop below −5 °C (23 °F) with heavy frost and occasional snow, while in the north-west summer temperatures can surpass 45 °C (113 °F). Severe thunderstorms and damaging floods are a threat at times, as are bushfires in dry years.

=== Southern Downs ===
Part of the Darling Downs, which includes the towns of Allora, Clifton, Warwick, Killarney and the rocky district in the south known as the Granite Belt, is known as the Southern Downs. The phrase is also used to define political boundaries and in the promotion of tourism in the area. The Dumaresq and the MacIntyre are found in this part of the region. (This is different to the IBRA subregion also known as The Southern Downs Interim Biogeographic Regionalisation for Australia, which is further west, around the towns of Roma, Mitchell and Injune).

== Industry ==
The Queensland Gas Pipeline oil pipeline and the Roma to Brisbane Pipeline, Australia's first natural gas pipeline both cross the region from west to east. There are three coal mines, New Acland Mine, Kogan Creek Mine and Cameby Downs coal mine and a number of power stations situated on the Downs, including the Millmerran Power Station, Oakey Power Station, Darling Downs Power Station and the Kogan Creek Power Station. Tarong Power Station is building the state's largest grid battery storage project. The Dingo Fence starts at the town of Jimbour across the country to the Great Australian Bight. Mining exploration leases cover more than 90% of the Darling Downs. The western Downs has seen a massive installation of coal seam gas wells.

After agriculture and mining and manufacturing are the next most important sectors. Manufacturing focuses on food and beverages but also the production of machinery, equipment and metal products.

=== Agriculture ===
The region produces around one quarter of the state's agricultural output. Water for irrigation is mostly sourced from groundwater from alluvial aquifers. Water is also extracted from streams, off-stream reservoirs and on-farm dams. The lower temperatures of the milder summers in the Stanthorpe and Killarney regions allows farmers to grow lettuce, celery, brassicas and potato.

The Darling Downs contains the largest deposit of rich black agricultural soils in Australia. A commonly grown grass species Panicum coloratum, also known as Bambatsi, is well-suited for pastures used for grazing because it is suitable to the heavy-cracking clay soils found in the area. The eastern Downs feature a wide range of soil types.

Brothers Friedrich Wilhelm Ernst Ziesemer and Theodor Martin Peter Ziesemer were significant pioneers of large scale wheat farming on the Darling Downs.

=== Meat ===
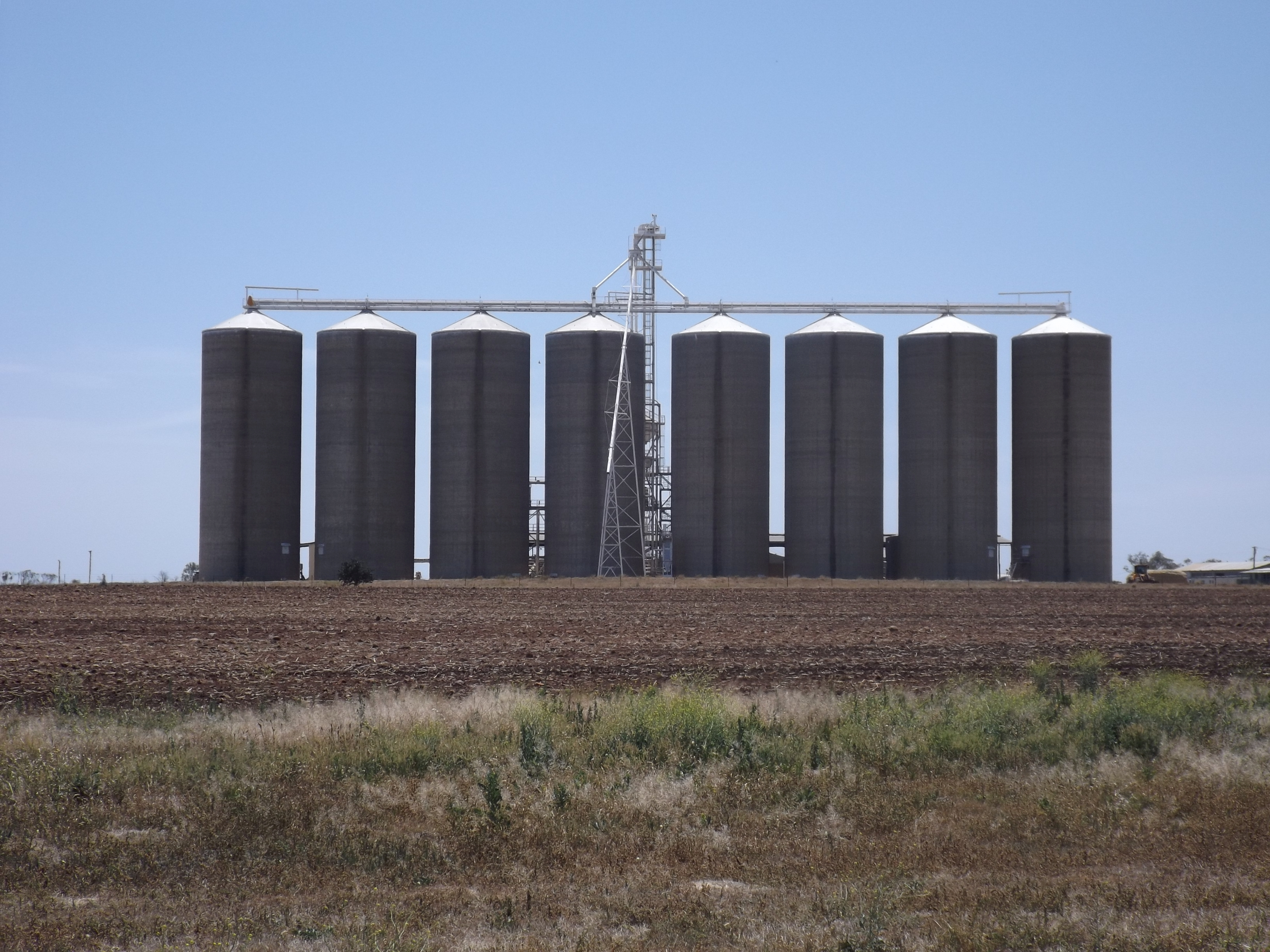
Grain silos at Purrawunda, 2014

The area is home to Australia's largest concentration of feedlots. In 2010, two abattoirs at Pittsworth and Killarney owned by Dudley Leitch were closed. Several other plants in the area were also closed leaving the remaining meat processor at Yangan in high demand. By late 2012, the industry was recovering with smaller processing facilities at Crows Nest and Inglewood opening. In 2014, the Oakey Abattoir which is the fourth largest meat processing plant in Australia, launched an environmental initiative to extract green energy biogas from its waste water streams. It was the first ever use of a covered lagoon to treat effluent.

=== Wine ===
In the Southern Downs region surrounding Stanthorpe in an area called the Granite Belt there are now over sixty cellar doors, wineries, and vineyards. The industry first began as a table grape growing region that by the mid-1960s was starting to plant wine grape cultivars. This region has a subtropical highland climate atypical to the rest of Queensland due to its elevation. Altitudes from 680 m to over 1200 m above sea level make it ideally suited to premium wine production.

== Attractions ==
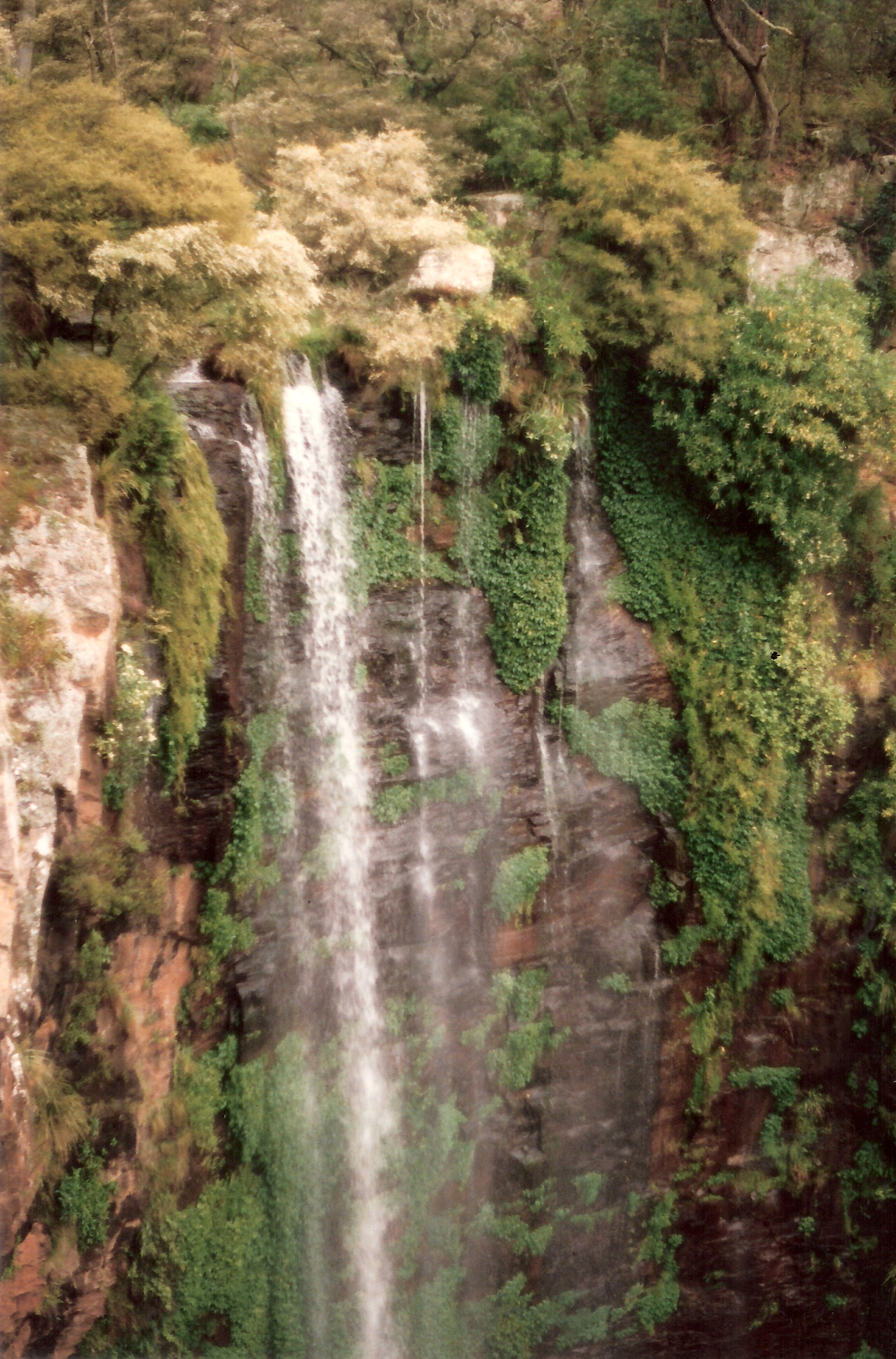
Queen Mary Falls

The region is popular with tourists because of its many natural and heritage attractions, including the Goomburra State Forest, Cunninghams Gap, Spicers Gap and the Queen Mary Falls near Killarney in the Main Range National Park. Lake Broadwater is the only natural lake on the tablelands.

The town of Jandowae gained fame after offering vacant blocks of land for just $1. This was done to encourage residents to settle in the small town which had less than 1,000 people in 2001.

The Cobb & Co Museum has displays of horse-drawn vehicles and material on the history of the Darling Downs. The Jondaryan Woolshed is a heritage-listed shearing shed situated at a site where a tourist operator has collected numerous related structures. The region has also a small zoo, Darling Downs Zoo near Clifton.

The region has uncovered important megafauna fossil finds. The rich discoveries have lent weight to the theory that humans were not a factor in the extinction of the ancient megafauna species. Many of the fossils in the region date to the Pleistocene and include species such as Diprotodon optatum, the largest-ever marsupial. In 2021, examination of a partial skull revealed a site on the Darling Downs was the location for a new species of Tomistominae crocodile, representing the largest extinct crocodile species ever discovered in Australia.

The Darling Downs Golf Association has 21 affiliated golf clubs on the Darling Downs.

The Carnival of Flowers attracts hundreds of thousands of tourists to Toowoomba each September since 1950.

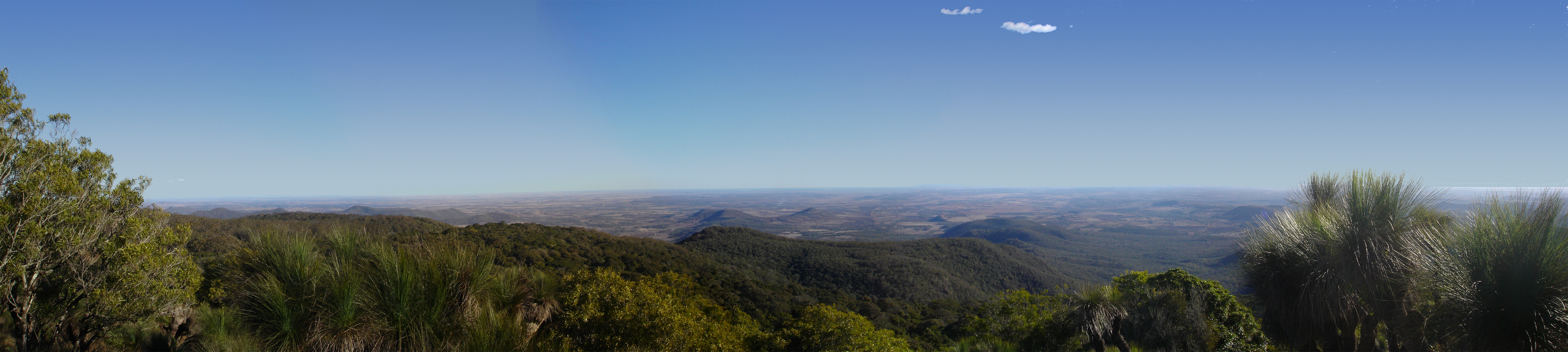
Darling Downs viewed from the Bunya Mountains

== Environment ==
Before European settlement many areas on the Darling Downs were fertile wilderness. For example, around Ma Ma Creek, rich swampy wetlands provided a haven for many animal species not currently found on the downs. The Darling Downs hopping mouse and paradise parrot have both become extinct since cattle farming began.

The New Acland Mine expansion, north of Oakey, has been delayed by the largest environmental public interest court cases in Australian history.

== Awards ==
In 2009 as part of the Q150 celebrations, the Darling Downs was announced as one of the Q150 Icons of Queensland for its role as a "location".

== In fiction ==
Steele Rudd (Arthur Davis) wrote a series of comic novels on rural life, starting with On Our Selection (1899), about Dad, Mother and Dave Rudd of Snake Gully. The Rudds had four (or six) acres adjoining a sheep run in the Darling Downs. The stories were made into films and a radio series.

== See also ==
- Darling Downs Correctional Centre
