= List of coal mines in Queensland =

As of 2022 there were 86 coal mines in Queensland.

Mine Name	Company	Mine Type	Basin	Operations began	Production (Mt/a)	Use	Coal type
Jeebropilly Mine	New Hope Group	Open-cut	Clarence-Moreton	1982	0.5	Export	Thermal
Commodore	Intergen	Open-cut	Clarence-Moreton	2003	3.6	Domestic	Thermal
New Acland	New Hope Group	Open-cut	Clarence-Moreton	2002	4.2	Domestic & Export	Thermal
Meandu	Stanwell Corporation	Open-cut	Tarong	1983	7	Domestic	Thermal
Kogan Creek	CS Energy	Open-cut	Surat	2007	2.8	Domestic	Thermal
Dawson	AngloAmerican Coal	Open-cut	Bowen	1961	9	Export	Coking & Thermal
Olive Downs	Pembroke Resources	Open-cut	Bowen	2023	15	Export	Coking
Blackwater	Whitehaven Coal	Open-cut	Bowen	1967	13	Export	Coking & Thermal
Blair Athol	TerraCom	Open-cut	Bowen	1984	12.9	Export	Thermal
Burton	Peabody Energy	Open-cut	Bowen	1995	4.3	Export	Coking
Cameby Downs	Yancoal	Open-cut	Surat	2010	2	Export	Thermal
Carmichael	Adani Group	Open-cut	Galilee	2021	10	Export	Thermal
Collinsville	Glencore	Open-cut	Bowen Basin	1919	6	Export & Domestic	Coking & Thermal
Coppabella	joint venture with Peabody Energy as majority owner	Open-cut	Bowen	1998	4.2	Export	Coking
Curragh	Coronado Global Resources	Open-cut	Bowen	2004	8.5	Export & Domestic	Coking
Ensham coal mine	Sungela	Open-cut	Bowen	-	3.2	Export & Domestic	Thermal
Foxleigh coal mine	joint venture between QMetco, POSCO and Nippon Steel	Open-cut	Bowen	1999	3.1	Export	Coking
Broadmeadow Mine	BMA	Underground	Bowen	2005		Export	Coking

== See also ==
- List of mines in Australia
- Coal in Australia
- Energy in Australia
