= Cressbrook Creek, Queensland =

Cressbrook Creek
- Suburb
- Interactive map of Cressbrook Creek
- Coordinates: 27.2372°S 152.1672°E
- Country: Australia
- State: Queensland
- LGA: Toowoomba Region
- Location: 20.5 km (12.7 mi) SE of Crows Nest; 36.6 km (22.7 mi) NE of Highfields; 49.1 km (30.5 mi) NNE of Toowoomba CBD; 57.1 km (35.5 mi) SW of Toogoolawah; 142 km (88 mi) W of Brisbane

Government
  - State electorate: Nanango
  - Federal division: Maranoa

Area
  - Total: 57.3 km^{2} (22.1 sq mi)

Population
  - Total: 10 (2021 census)
  - Density: 0.17/km^{2} (0.45/sq mi)
- Time zone: UTC+10:00 (AEST)
- Postcode: 4355
Suburbs around Cressbrook Creek
The Bluff	Eskdale	Eskdale
Crows Nest	Cressbrook Creek	Biarra
Crows Nest	Ravensbourne	Biarra

Cressbrook Creek is a rural locality in the Toowoomba Region, Queensland, Australia. In the 2021 census, Cressbrook Creek had a population of 10 people.

== Geography ==
The watercourse Cressbrook Creek enters the locality from the west (Crows Nest) and flows east into Lake Cressbrook created by the Cressbrook Dam. Only the westernmost part of the lake is within the locality of Cressbrook Creek with most of lake and the dam wall being within the neighbouring locality of Biarra to the east and south-east.

Cressbrook Creek has the following mountains (from north to south):

- Mount Sevastopol on the eastern boundary of the locality (27.2392°S 152.2033°E) 557 metres (1,827 ft)
- Mount Dongineeriaman (Sandy Mountain) in the south of the locality (27.2799°S 152.1462°E) 597 metres (1,959 ft)

The land use is predominantly grazing on native vegetation.

== Demographics ==
In the 2016 census, Cressbrook Creek had a population of 20 people.

In the 2021 census, Cressbrook Creek had a population of 10 people.

== Education ==
There are no schools in Cressbrook Creek. The nearest government primary school is Crow's Nest State School in neighbouring Crows Nest to the south-west, which also provides secondary schooling to Year 10. The nearest government secondary schools to Year 12 are Toogoolawah State High School in Toogoolawah to the north-east and Highfields State Secondary College in Highfields to the south-west. There are also non-government schools in and around Highfields.

== See also ==
- List of tramways in Queensland
