= Boeing CH-47 Chinook in Australian service =

Australian military heavy-lift helicopters

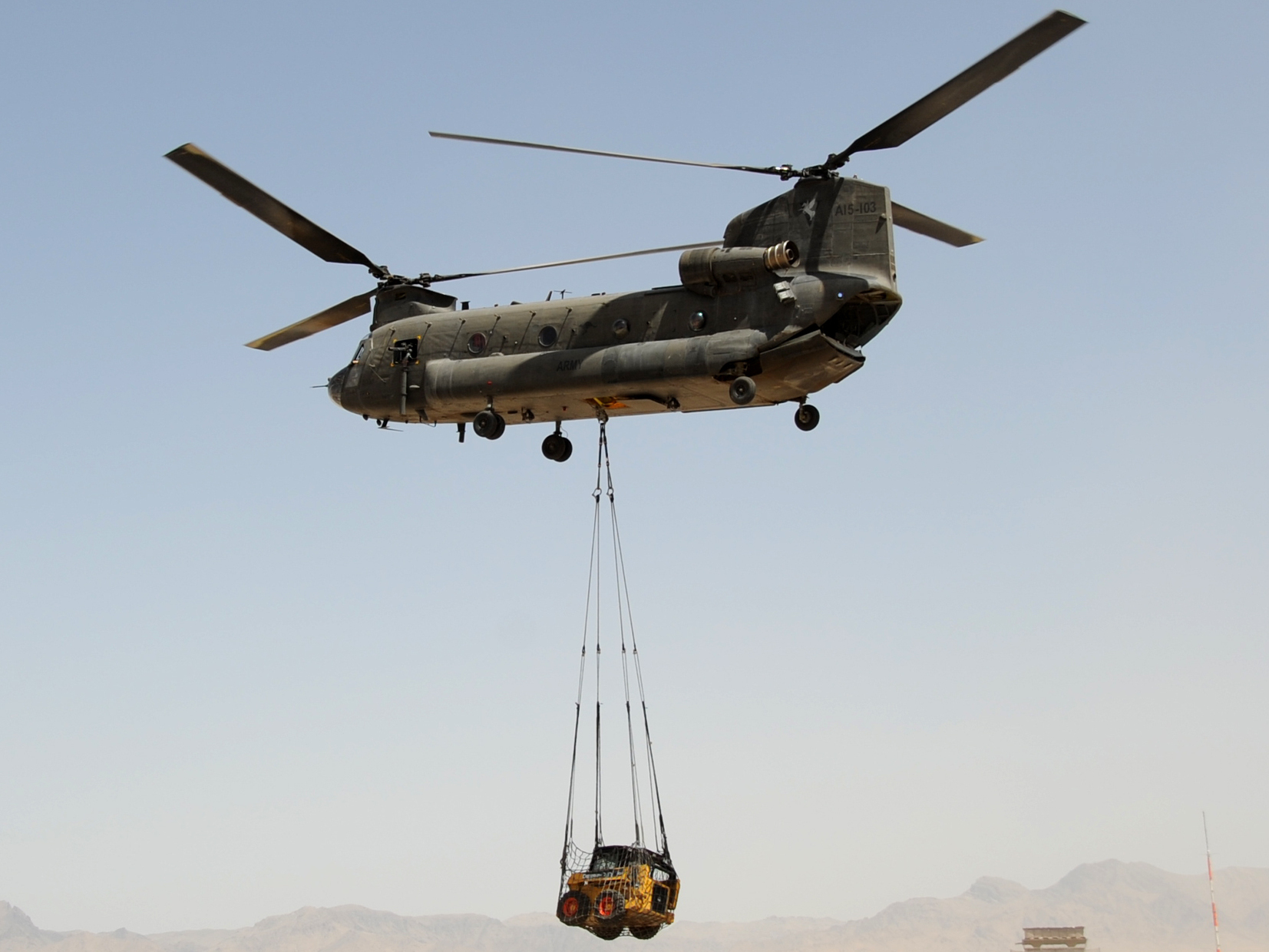
- An Australian Army CH-47D Chinook lifting a front loader in Afghanistan during 2012

General information
- Type: Heavy-lift helicopter
- Manufacturer: Boeing
- Primary user: Royal Australian Air Force and Australian Army
- Number built: 12 CH-47C, 8 CH-47D, 14 CH-47F
- Serial: A15-001 to A15-012 (CH-47C); A15-102 to A15-106 and A15-201 to A15-202 (CH-47D); A15-301 to A15-314 (CH-47F)

History
- In service: 1974–1989, 1995–present

The Australian Defence Force has operated Boeing CH-47 Chinook heavy-lift helicopters for most of the period since 1974. Thirty four of the type have entered Australian service, comprising twelve CH-47C variants, eight CH-47Ds and fourteen CH-47Fs. The helicopters have been operated by both the Royal Australian Air Force (RAAF) and Australian Army.

An initial order of eight Chinooks for the RAAF was placed in 1962, but soon cancelled in favour of more urgent priorities. The Australian military still required helicopters of this type, and twelve CH-47C Chinooks were ordered in 1970. The CH-47s entered service with the RAAF in December 1974. The eleven surviving Chinooks were retired in 1989 as a cost-saving measure, but it was found that the Australian Defence Force's other helicopters could not replace their capabilities. As a result, four of the CH-47Cs were upgraded to CH-47D standard, and returned to service in 1995 with the Australian Army. The Army acquired two more CH-47Ds in 2000 and another pair in 2012. The CH-47Ds were replaced with seven new CH-47F aircraft during 2015, and another three were delivered in 2016. A further four CH-47Fs were ordered in 2021, with two being delivered that year and two others arriving in 2022.

The Chinooks have mainly been used to support the Australian Army, though they have performed a wide range of other tasks. Three Chinooks took part in the Iraq War during 2003, when they transported supplies and Australian special forces. A detachment of two Chinooks was also deployed to Afghanistan during the northern spring and summer months for each year between 2006 and 2007 and 2008 to 2013, seeing extensive combat. Two of the CH-47s deployed to Afghanistan were destroyed in crashes. The helicopters have also frequently been assigned to assist recovery efforts following natural disasters and undertook a range of civilian construction tasks while being operated by the RAAF.

== Acquisition ==
During the early 1960s the Australian Army and RAAF considered new types of tactical transport aircraft to replace the RAAF's obsolete Douglas Dakotas. The Army wanted a simple and rugged aircraft that could be purchased immediately, and pressed for the acquisition of de Havilland Canada DHC-4 Caribous. The RAAF regarded the Caribou as inadequate for the intended role and preferred a more sophisticated aircraft, leading to delays in the selection process.

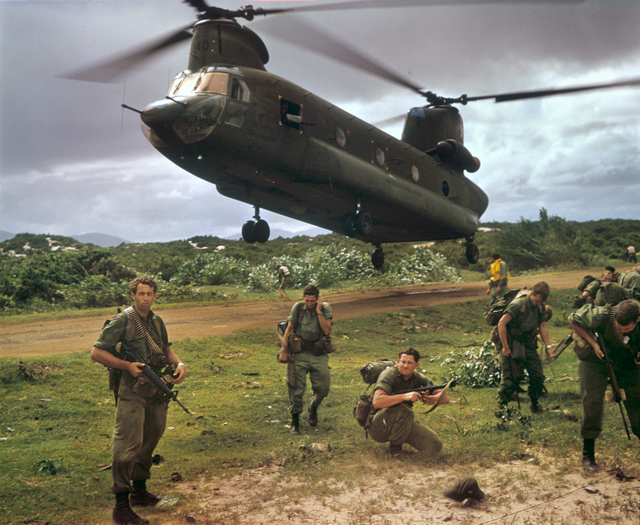
Australian soldiers with a US Army Chinook at the conclusion of a 1967 combat operation in South Vietnam

This disagreement ended in September 1962. As part of the expansion of the military in response to Indonesia's policy of "confrontation" with its neighbours, the RAAF was directed by the Australian Government to conduct an urgent evaluation of short takeoff and landing aircraft and heavy-lift helicopters that could be purchased to improve the Army's tactical mobility. An Air Staff Requirement was established in October that year for a project to acquire eight heavy-lift helicopters and introduce them into service by 1971. A team of seven RAAF officers headed by Group Captain Charles Read, the director of operational requirements, was immediately dispatched to the United States and assessed the Sikorsky S-61, Boeing Vertol 107-II and CH-47 Chinook helicopters. The team judged the Chinook to be clearly the most suitable of these types, and recommended that several be acquired; this was in line with the Army's preference. The Government subsequently accepted a recommendation made by the RAAF to acquire a package of twelve Caribou fixed-wing aircraft and eight Chinooks, and placed an order for these aircraft within weeks of the evaluation. The Chinook order was cancelled by the Government when it was learned that it would take several years for the helicopters to be delivered, and the RAAF's orders of Caribous and Bell UH-1 Iroquois tactical transport helicopters were expanded instead.

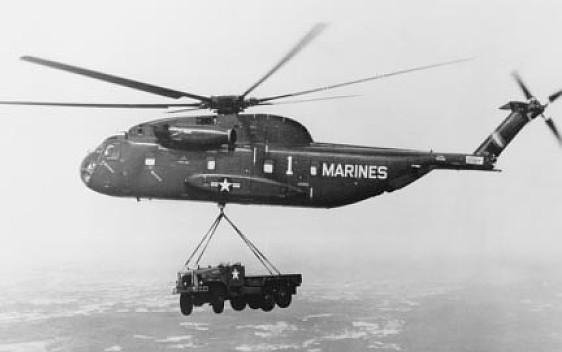
A Sikorsky CH-53A Sea Stallion in flight; this type was preferred by a joint RAAF-Army evaluation team in 1969

The Australian military continued to consider options to acquire heavy-lift helicopters throughout the 1960s, and a formal program to achieve this goal was initiated by the RAAF in 1969. The Federal Government's Cabinet approved the acquisition of twelve such helicopters in August that year. At this time the helicopters were intended to be deployed to South Vietnam as part of the Australian contribution to the Vietnam War. A team of nine Air Force and Army officers travelled to the United States in October 1969 to evaluate the Sikorsky CH-53 Sea Stallion and Chinook. The team, which was led by Group Captain Peter Raw, recommended that CH-53s be ordered as the type had superior flying characteristics. Senior RAAF officers and the Army were not pleased with this outcome, and the Air Board rejected Raw's report. Read, who was now an air vice-marshal and deputy chief of the air staff, was directed to review the choice of helicopters, and again recommended that Chinooks be acquired. He justified this choice on the grounds that the Chinook could carry more cargo than the CH-53 and was better suited for operations in the mountains of the Australian-administered Territory of Papua and New Guinea. The Government believed that both types met the RAAF's requirements, but a project to acquire Chinooks would be lower risk than purchasing CH-53s. As a result, an order for twelve CH-47C Chinooks was announced on 19 August 1970. It was planned to rotate the helicopters in and out of service, six being available at any time. The order was suspended later in 1970 when a series of engine problems affected the United States Army's CH-47Cs, but was reinstated in March 1972 after these issues were resolved. The total cost of the purchase was $A37 million. The order made Australia the CH-47's first export customer.

The contract for the Chinooks included an offset agreement with Boeing through which the firm gave Australian companies opportunities to manufacture components of both the RAAF's helicopters and those destined for other customers. This was the first of several such agreements that were included in Australian military aircraft procurement contracts during the 1970s and 1980s, the goal being to assist the local defence industry to access international markets. This agreement had some benefits, as several of the participating Australian companies upgraded their factories to manufacture complex elements of the CH-47. The offset contracts for the Chinook concluded in the early 1980s, but the improved equipment and manufacturing processes were employed in the project to build McDonnell Douglas F/A-18 Hornet fighter aircraft in Australia between 1985 and 1990. In line with the RAAF's procurement and support philosophy and the aim of ensuring that the force was self-sufficient, a very large quantity of spare parts for the CH-47Cs was also ordered; in 1993 it was reported that this was the second-largest stockpile of Chinook spare parts after that held by Boeing, and was worth more than $A120 million.

It was decided to station the Chinooks at RAAF Base Amberley, Queensland, as it was located at the midpoint between the Army's main field formations that were based on the outskirts of Sydney in New South Wales and the north Queensland city of Townsville. Construction began on support facilities for the helicopters at Amberley shortly after the order for them was confirmed in 1972.

== Royal Australian Air Force service ==
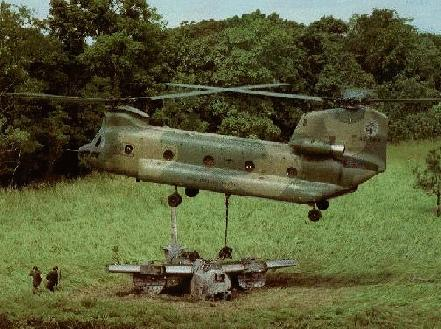
A RAAF CH-47C Chinook lifting a crashed World War II-era A-20 Boston in Papua New Guinea

No. 12 Squadron was re-raised at Amberley on 3 September 1973 to operate the Chinooks. This unit had flown bombers between 1939 and 1948 before being renumbered No. 1 Squadron. The twelve CH-47s were officially accepted by the RAAF in the United States on 9 October 1973. They were subsequently shipped to Australia on board the aircraft carrier HMAS Melbourne, and were unloaded at Brisbane on 28 March 1974. No. 12 Squadron began training flights on 8 July 1974, and the unit was declared operational in December the next year. The squadron typically had between four and six CH-47Cs operational at any time throughout the type's service, the fleet being rotated through long-term storage at RAAF Base Amberley as planned. In November 1980, eight Chinooks were simultaneously operational for the first time, and a formation flight was conducted to mark the occasion. The CH-47Cs had a crew of four, comprising two pilots, a loadmaster and one other, and could transport up to 33 passengers or 11,129 kilograms (24,535 lb) of cargo. The helicopters were assigned serial numbers A15-001 to A15-012.

The Chinooks' main role was to support the Army. The helicopters were used to transport troops, artillery guns, ammunition, fuel and other supplies. They also provided part of the aeromedical evacuation capability available to the Army. While the Chinooks generally operated in Northern Australia, they made frequent deployments to other parts of Australia, and No. 12 Squadron conducted an annual high-altitude flying training exercise in Papua New Guinea. As part of the security measures introduced after the Sydney Hilton Hotel bombing on 13 February 1978, Chinooks were used to transport Australian Prime Minister Malcolm Fraser and several other national leaders from Sydney to Bowral for a Commonwealth Heads of Government Regional Meeting. In August 1980, a CH-47 was flown from Amberley to Malaysia, and used to recover a Royal Malaysian Air Force S-61 helicopter that had crashed in a remote location. This involved a return trip of 14,000 kilometres (8,700 mi), which was believed to have been the longest distance a helicopter had flown up to that time and remains the longest flight to have been conducted by a RAAF helicopter.

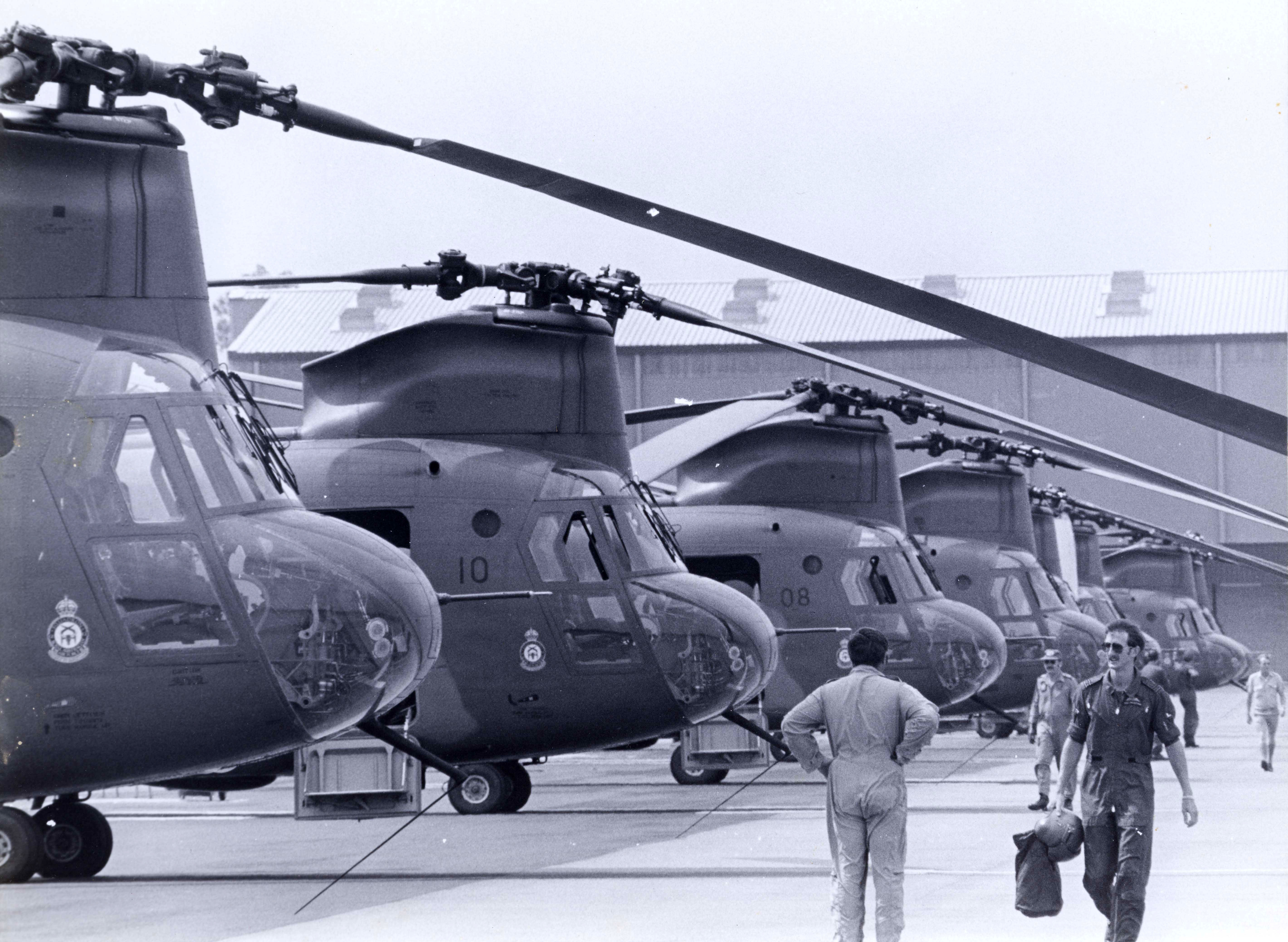
No. 12 Squadron Chinooks at RAAF Base Amberley

During their RAAF service, the Chinooks also undertook a range of non-military tasks. The helicopters frequently formed part of the Australian Defence Force's response to natural disasters, including by delivering food for people and livestock cut off by floods. They were also used for civilian construction tasks such as emplacing lighthouses and carrying air conditioning equipment to the tops of tall buildings. On two occasions Chinooks supported Queensland Police Service drug eradication efforts in remote parts of the state by transporting fuel for RAAF Iroquois helicopters and carrying seized narcotics. In August 1981, two CH-47s lifted containers from the cargo ship Waigani Express to enable the vessel to be refloated after it ran aground in the Torres Strait. A similar operation was undertaken to free the Anro Asia when it ran aground near Caloundra, Queensland, in November the same year. Another unusual task was conducted in December 1981 when a Chinook transported two bulldozers onto a grounded iron ore carrier near Port Hedland, so that they could be used to reposition the ship's load. In May 1989 a Chinook transported a 8,000-kilogram (18,000 lb) section of a memorial to the pioneering aviator Lawrence Hargrave onto Mount Keira near Wollongong.

The RAAF's Chinook fleet suffered two serious accidents. On 26 June 1975, A15-011 crashed when one of its engine turbines disintegrated; none of its crew were injured. The helicopter was initially assessed as a write off, but No. 3 Aircraft Depot was later assigned responsibility for repairing it. The maintenance unit lacked experience with major helicopter repairs, and A15-011 did not reenter service until 21 May 1981. On 4 February 1985, A15-001 struck power lines and crashed into Perseverance Dam near Toowoomba, Queensland, while undertaking a navigation exercise. The helicopter's pilot, an exchange officer from the Royal Air Force, was killed and the other three aircrew suffered minor injuries. The helicopter was written off and used as a fire training aid at Amberley. A court of inquiry found that A15-001's crew had been unaware of the presence of power lines in the area as they were not marked on the maps used to plan the flight, and were difficult to see from a moving helicopter. The inquiry also judged that the mission had been inadequately planned, and recommended that No. 12 Squadron update the master map used for preparing operations in the Amberley region to ensure that it included all flying hazards.

In November 1986 the Chiefs of Staff Committee and Minister for Defence Kim Beazley decided to transfer all of the RAAF's Iroquois and Sikorsky S-70 Black Hawk battlefield helicopters to the Army. The Army did not want the Chinooks due to their high operating costs, and they remained with the RAAF at this time. The reduction of the RAAF's helicopter fleet increased the cost of operating the Chinooks due to the loss of economies of scale, and made it more difficult to find aircrew for No. 12 Squadron. The RAAF subsequently proposed transferring the Chinooks, but the Army remained unwilling to accept them. The problems the Army was experiencing keeping the Iroquois and Black Hawks operational may have influenced this position, the service being reluctant to take on an even more complex type.

The RAAF and Army jointly decided to withdraw the Chinooks from service in May 1989. This decision was made to reduce costs, the Army believing that the Black Hawks would provide sufficient air lift capability. No. 12 Squadron ceased flying on 30 June 1989, and was disbanded on 25 August that year. The CH-47Cs were placed in storage at Amberley.

== Australian Army service ==
=== CH-47D Chinook ===
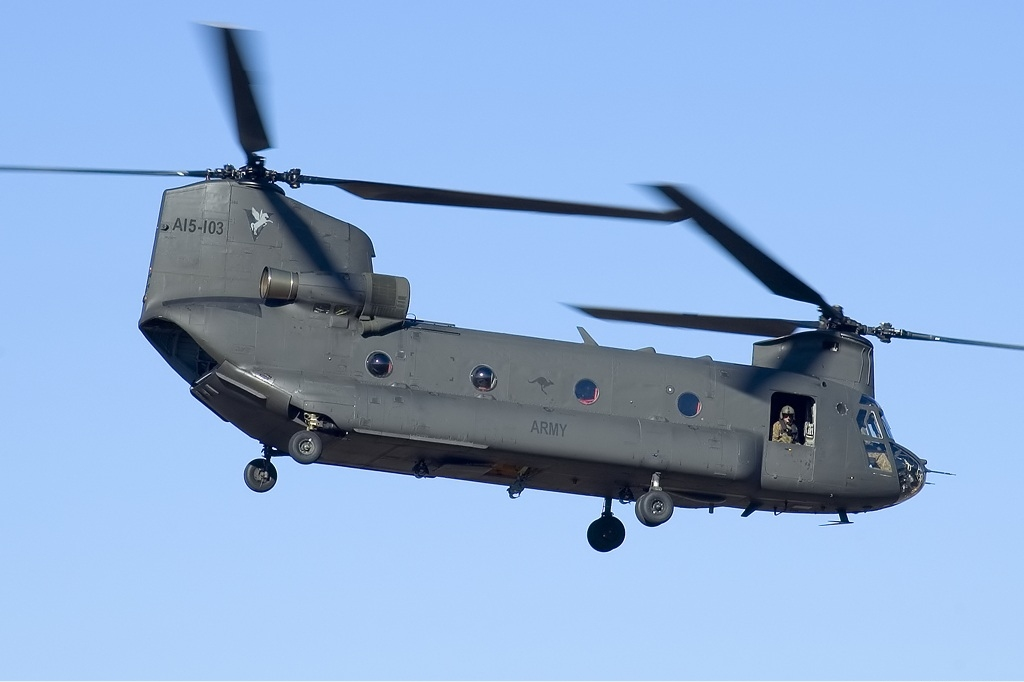
An Australian Army CH-47D Chinook in 2005

While it was intended to sell the Chinooks after they were withdrawn from service, experience soon demonstrated that the Black Hawks were unable to fully replace them. In particular, it was found that heavy-lift helicopters were needed to transport fuel supplies for the Black Hawks during exercises and operations. As a result, plans to sell the Chinooks were put on hold in late 1989, and the Army and RAAF began investigating options to reactivate them. The 1991 Force Structure Review recommended that between four and six Chinooks—preferably upgraded to CH-47D standard—be reactivated to support the Black Hawks.

A deal to upgrade several of the Chinooks was reached in June 1993. Under this arrangement, seven of the surviving CH-47Cs were sold to the US Army for $A40 million, the funds being used to partly cover the cost of upgrading the remaining four to CH-47D standard. The project's total cost was $A62 million, of which $A42 million was required to upgrade the four helicopters and the remainder for spare parts, administration and new facilities for the Chinooks at Townsville. It was also decided at this time to transfer the Chinooks to the Australian Army, as the RAAF no longer had significant expertise in operating the type and such a change would concentrate all the ADF's battlefield helicopters with the same service. The CH-47D variant of the Chinook was based on the C variant's airframe, and had improved engines and rotors, as well as upgraded avionics. These modifications resulted in the type having superior performance as well as lower operating costs.

All eleven CH-47Cs were shipped to the United States in September 1993, and the upgraded helicopters returned to Australia in 1995. The four CH-47Ds upgraded were the former A15-002, 003, 004, and 006, now renumbered A15-102, 103, 104, and 106 respectively. They were assigned to C Squadron of the 5th Aviation Regiment, which was based at Townsville, and also comprised two squadrons equipped with Black Hawks as well as six Iroquois helicopters used as gunships. The Regiment's experiences during the 1990s demonstrated that four Chinooks were not sufficient to meet the ADF's needs, leading to an order for two newly built CH-47Ds in 1998. These helicopters were delivered in 2001, and designated A15-201 and A15-202.

Following their transfer to the Army, the Chinooks were used in similar roles to those they had undertaken in RAAF service. The first operational deployment of the Army Chinooks began in October 1997, when two of the helicopters and three Black Hawks that were in Papua New Guinea as part of a training exercise were tasked with delivering food supplies to the highlands of the country following a severe drought. The Chinooks were also used to transport fuel supplies for the other ADF aircraft and helicopters involved in this effort. At this time, the deployment of two Chinooks was the largest possible given the need to reserve other CH-47s for training tasks and rotate the fleet through maintenance periods. The Chinooks returned to Australia in March 1998. None of the CH-47s were available to support the Australian-led INTERFET peacekeeping deployment to East Timor in 1999 as the fleet had been grounded due to systematic problems with their transmissions. United States Marine Corps CH-53s and Mil Mi-8 and Mil Mi-26 helicopters chartered from Bulgarian and Russian companies were used instead.

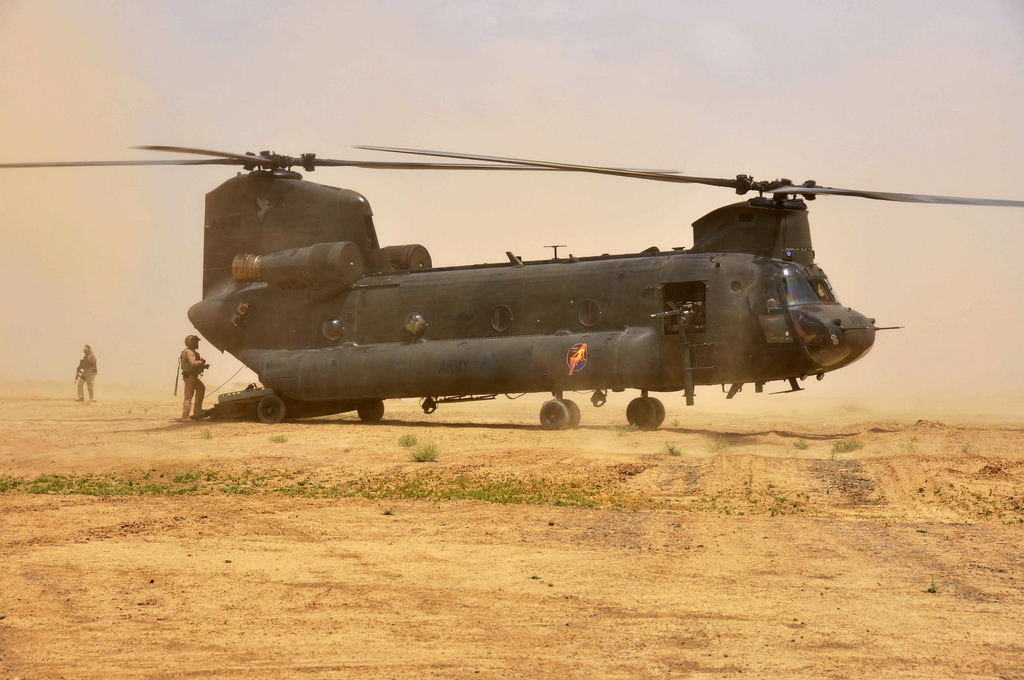
An Australian Chinook in Afghanistan during 2012

In 2003 a detachment of three CH-47Ds was deployed to the Middle East as part of the Australian contribution to the invasion of Iraq. The detachment formed part of the Special Operations Task Group, and operated from Jordan to transport supplies and personnel for Australian special forces units. Two histories published in 2004 stated that the helicopters entered Western Iraq throughout the initial stage of the conflict. A 2005 history also stated that one of the tasks undertaken by the detachment was flying commandos from the 4th Battalion, Royal Australian Regiment to Al Asad Airbase within Iraq after the facility was captured by Special Air Service Regiment units. However, an uncompleted internal Army history of the deployment of Australian forces to the Iraq War—released in 2017 following a freedom of information request—stated that as the Chinooks were not equipped with missile countermeasure systems and their pilots had not been trained to insert special forces behind enemy lines, they had been prohibited from entering Iraq and remained in Jordan throughout the conflict. This history stated that "it is not possible to explain the rationale" for the deployment of the CH-47s given their unsuitability for operations within Iraq, and judged that the main achievement of the detachment had been to free up British and American helicopters for other tasks.

During 2005 the Australian Government decided to deploy Chinooks to Afghanistan as part of the Australian forces in the country. The need to prepare for this task contributed to a decision in October that year to dispatch Black Hawks rather than Chinooks to Pakistan as part of Australia's contribution to the international relief efforts which followed the 2005 Kashmir earthquake, despite the Chinooks being better suited for operations at the high altitudes affected by the disaster. In November 2005 the Government authorised a program of urgent upgrades to the CH-47Ds to improve their combat readiness ahead of being deployed to Afghanistan. The upgrades included fitting the helicopters with extra armour as well as new electronic warfare and communications systems. The helicopters' machine guns were also replaced with M134D miniguns. A longer-term plan to upgrade the helicopters, designated Phase 5 of project AIR 9000, was also in place at this time. This was to involve two sub-phases: under Phase 5A new engines were purchased in December 2004, and were scheduled to be fitted in late 2006. It was also planned to put the helicopters through a mid-life update as part of Phase 5B, enabling them to remain in service until around 2025. Following the RAAF's acquisition of Boeing C-17 Globemaster III large transport aircraft in 2007, the Chinooks were transported by air on occasion. However, it took one and a half days to prepare the CH-47Ds for air transport.

A detachment of two Chinooks operated in Afghanistan during 2006 to 2007 and 2008 to 2013. The detachment was designated the Aviation Support Element during 2006 and 2007, and renamed the Rotary Wing Group in 2008. The initial detachment arrived at Kandahar International Airport in March 2006, and was tasked with supporting the Australian Special Forces Task Group in the country. The upgrades the helicopters had received proved successful, and allowed them to operate in combat alongside other Coalition CH-47s. After the Special Forces Task Group was withdrawn in September 2006 the helicopters remained in the country and were used to support Coalition forces, with a particular emphasis on the Australian units located in Urozgan Province. The detachment was withdrawn to Australia in February 2007, and did not deploy again until February 2008. During this period all six helicopters received further upgrades, which included new engines and blue force tracker equipment. During subsequent years the detachment was withdrawn to Australia over the Afghan winters, and redeployed each northern spring. As the Chinooks' tasking was controlled by the International Security Assistance Force, the ADF chartered a Russian Mil Mi-26 between 2010 and 2013 to provide the Australian forces in Afghanistan with a dedicated heavylift helicopter. By the end of the final rotation on 14 September 2013, the helicopters had flown more than 6,000 hours in combat and transported almost 40,000 personnel. Preparing for and sustaining the Rotary Wing Group rotations absorbed most of C Squadron's resources throughout this period, and Chinooks were rarely available for other Army training or operational tasks.

Former Australian Army CH-47D A15-202 on display at the Australian War Memorial in 2026

Two Australian CH-47Ds were destroyed in Afghanistan. On 30 May 2011, A15-102 crashed in Zabul Province, resulting in the death of an Army unmanned aerial vehicle pilot who was travelling on board as a passenger. As it was impractical to recover the helicopter, it was destroyed by Coalition forces. The official inquiry into the crash found that it was caused by a known issue in which Chinooks suffered uncommanded pitch oscillations while flying at high density altitudes, and that the aircrew had not been adequately trained to prevent such incidents. A15-103 was written off following a hard landing in Kandahar Province on 22 June 2012; one of the crew members suffered minor injuries. Both of the Chinooks at Kandahar International Airport in April 2013 also suffered significant damage when the airport was struck by a severe hail storm. Two ex-US Army CH-47Ds were purchased in December 2011 to replace A15-102, and arrived in Australia in January 2012; these helicopters were designated A15-151 and A15-152.

=== CH-47F Chinook ===
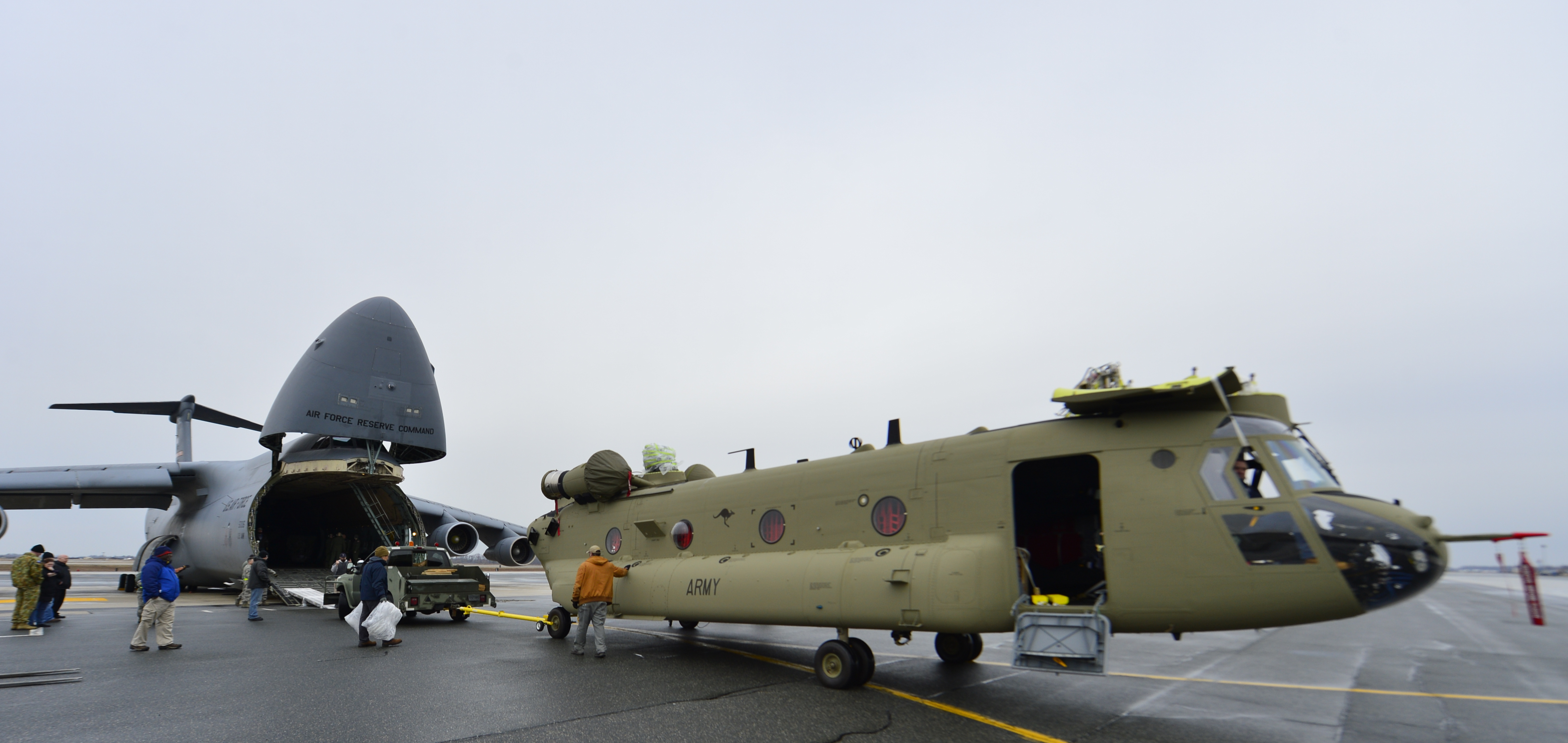
An Australian CH-47F shortly before being loaded on a United States Air Force Lockheed C-5 Galaxy in March 2015

A decision by the US Army in the mid-2000s to replace all its CH-47Ds with new-build CH-47Fs by 2017 endangered the viability of the Australian Chinooks. This was because the Australian Army's arrangements for the logistical support of its small number of CH-47Ds were heavily leveraged off those for the US Army's large fleet. In response, the Australian Army also established a project to acquire CH-47F Chinooks in the mid-2000s. The Australian Government provided initial approval for a CH-47F purchase in September 2007. As part of this decision, the Government chose to procure the helicopters through the US Government's Foreign Military Sales program to minimise potential risks to the schedule and cost of the project.

Final approval to acquire CH-47Fs was granted by the Australian Government in February 2010, seven of the helicopters being ordered. A contract was signed on 19 March that year. The decision to increase the fleet size from six to seven was made to improve the robustness of the Army's helicopter capacities, including by reducing the impact of the loss of any of the helicopters. The total cost of the CH-47F project, including the construction of new facilities and the acquisition of two flight simulators, was $A631 million.

The CH-47F has generally similar performance to the CH-47D, and was designed to be easier to maintain and deploy. Its fuselage comprises few machined components, rather than the many fabricated sections of sheet metal used in the D variant, which reduces vibration and structural cracking. The F variant also includes more advanced avionics as well as design features that enable the helicopters to be more quickly prepared for transport within a cargo aircraft. The initial seven Australian CH-47Fs are fitted with rotor brakes and other equipment to better enable them to operate from the Royal Australian Navy's Canberra class landing helicopter dock vessels, but are otherwise identical to those operated by the US Army.

Australia's first two CH-47Fs were delivered in early April 2015, eight months later than originally expected, and entered service with the 5th Aviation Regiment on 5 May that year. At this time it was planned for C Squadron to be fully operational with the new Chinooks by January 2017. The seventh CH-47F was delivered three weeks ahead of schedule in September 2015. These helicopters were designated A15-301 to A15-307.

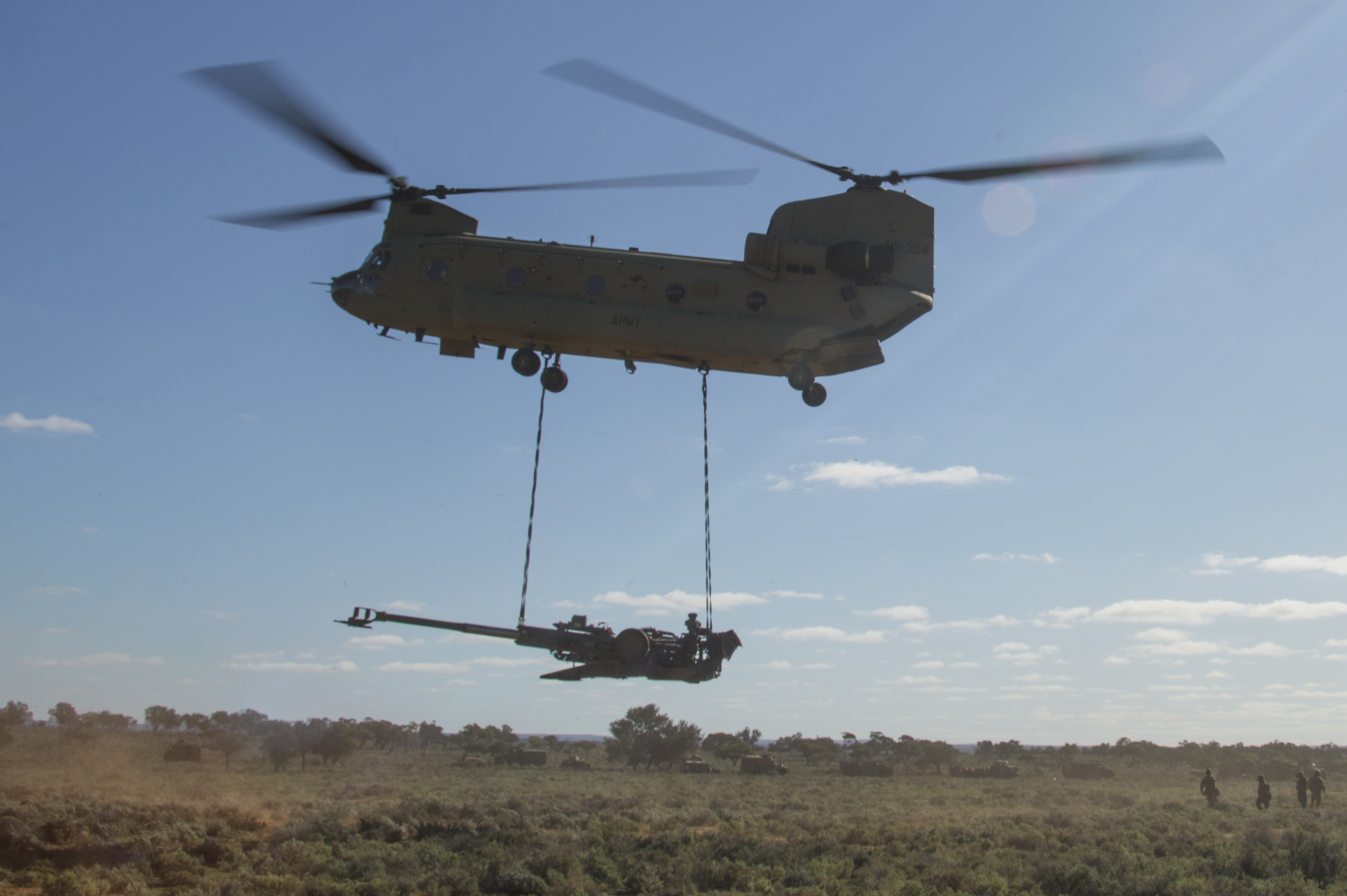
An Australian CH-47F carrying a M777A2 howitzer during a training exercise in 2016

An urgent order was placed in March 2016 for a further three CH-47Fs for $US150 million, including spare parts, related equipment and some support costs. The ADF had previously intended to expand the CH-47F fleet at a later date, but the order was placed at short notice to use funds made available by an under-spend on other Defence capabilities. All three helicopters were delivered in June 2016, two and half months earlier than planned. The Chinooks were designated A15-308 to A15-310. These helicopters are not fitted with rotor brakes as they were taken directly from the production line of helicopters for the US Army. As of 2017, it was planned to fit these helicopters with rotor brakes by 2020.

C Squadron's air crew undertook training to prepare them to operate the new type using the two flight simulators, and the CH-47F fleet achieved initial operating capacity in April 2016. During 2016, the CH-47s were approved to operate from the Canberra class vessels after trials proved successful. The first seven CH-47s reached full operating capability status in July 2017. C Squadron's operations were constrained at this time by personnel shortages and a backlog of maintenance tasks which at one point led to four of the helicopters simultaneously being out of service for deep maintenance. These constraints are expected to delay full operating capability status for the entire CH-47F fleet to 2020.

The CH-47Ds were retired as they became due for deep maintenance checks, the last of the type leaving service in September 2016. Due to the many common components between the D and F variants, the helicopters were stripped for spare parts before being preserved in Australia. A15-202 was handed over to the Australian War Memorial in April 2016, A15-104 will be displayed at the Australian Army Flying Museum and the former Air Force helicopter A15-106 was transferred to the RAAF Museum. The other three surviving CH-47Ds were retained by the Army for non-flying training, A15-151 and A15-152 for general and special forces training respectively, and A15-201 as a maintenance systems training airframe.

The 2016 Defence White Paper and its supporting documentation stated that the CH-47Fs will receive modifications to better enable them to perform aeromedical evacuation tasks by the 2025–26 financial year, and that it is intended to regularly upgrade the helicopters over time so that they can continue to be supported through the US military's logistics system. This will involve keeping pace with key changes introduced to the American CH-47F fleet, though there will be options to modify the helicopters to meet Australian requirements. As of 2017, the ADF intended to retain the CH-47Fs until 2040. The US Army has indicated that it will operate the type until the 2060s, which may lead to Australia doing the same.

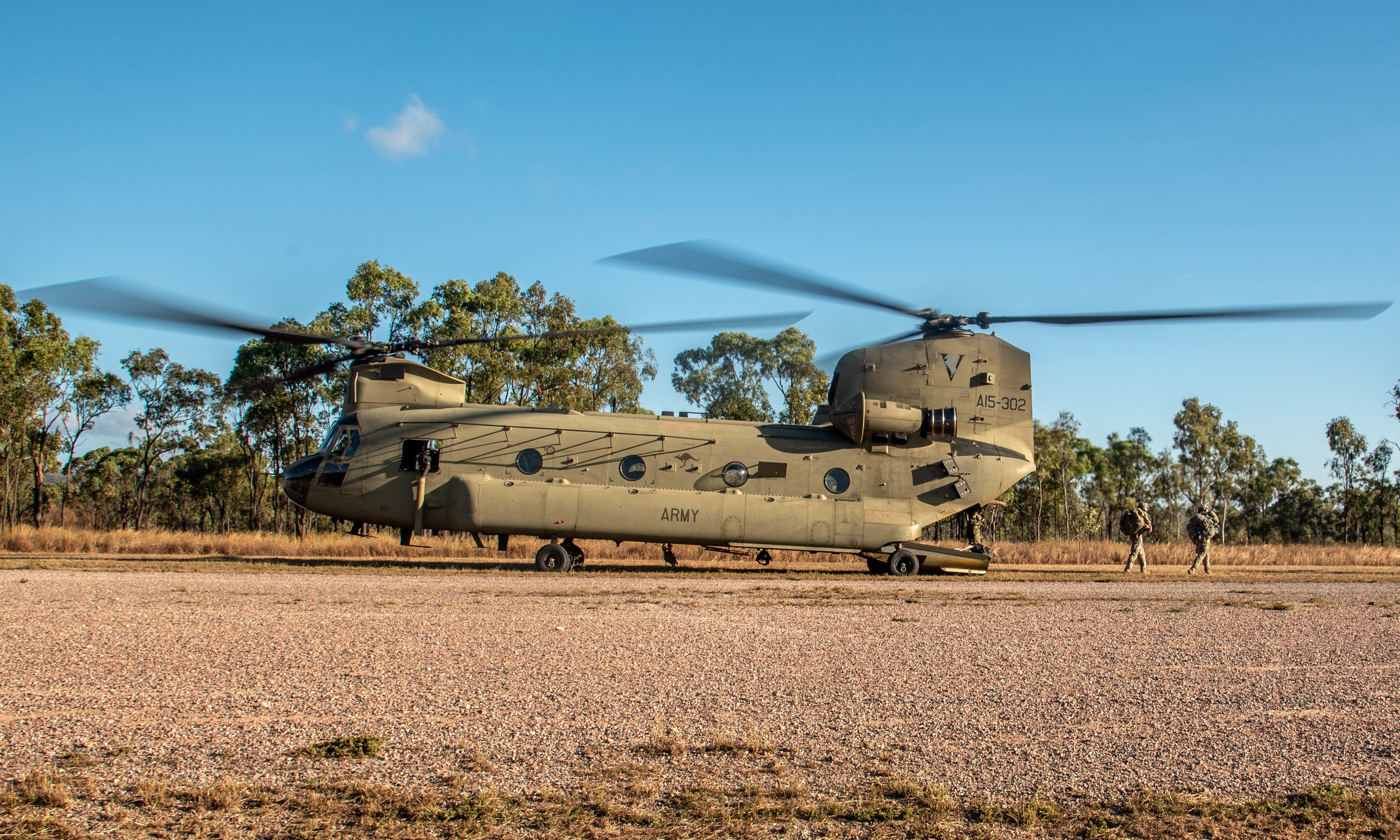
An Australian CH-47F in 2021

The first overseas deployment of Australian CH-47Fs commenced in early March 2018. On 8 March, the Australian Government announced that three of the helicopters would be dispatched to Papua New Guinea to assist the relief efforts for victims of the 2018 Papua New Guinea earthquake. The Chinooks commenced operations in the country on 11 March, and the deployment concluded in April that year. A detachment of several Chinooks was deployed to RAAF Base East Sale during January 2020 as part of the ADF's response to the 2019–20 Australian bushfire season. During this deployment the helicopters transported evacuees and a wide range of supplies and equipment. The CH-47F fleet flew for over 400 hours during the month, the highest number of flying hours achieved by Australian Chinooks since the type entered service.

In April 2021, the United States Department of State approved a potential sale of four CH-47Fs from US Army holdings to Australia. The Australian Government's interest in buying additional Chinooks had not been previously announced, and the Australian Defence Business Review has reported that it was partly motivated by "the low availability of the Army's MRH-90 Taipan helicopter fleet". The order was confirmed on 8 July 2021, at a price of $595 million. Two of the helicopters were delivered to Australia early that month on board a United States Air Force Lockheed C-5 Galaxy transport plane after the US Army agreed to transfer two of their aircraft. The other two were delivered in June 2022. The CH-47F fleet reached 20,000 flying hours on 3 December 2024.
