= Darling Downs Golf Association =

The Darling Downs Golf Association consists of 21 affiliated Golf Clubs on Queensland's (Australia) Darling Downs.
