= Ensham coal mine =

Mine in Queensland, Australia

Coordinates: 23°28′07″S 148°30′02″E

Ensham Coal Mine
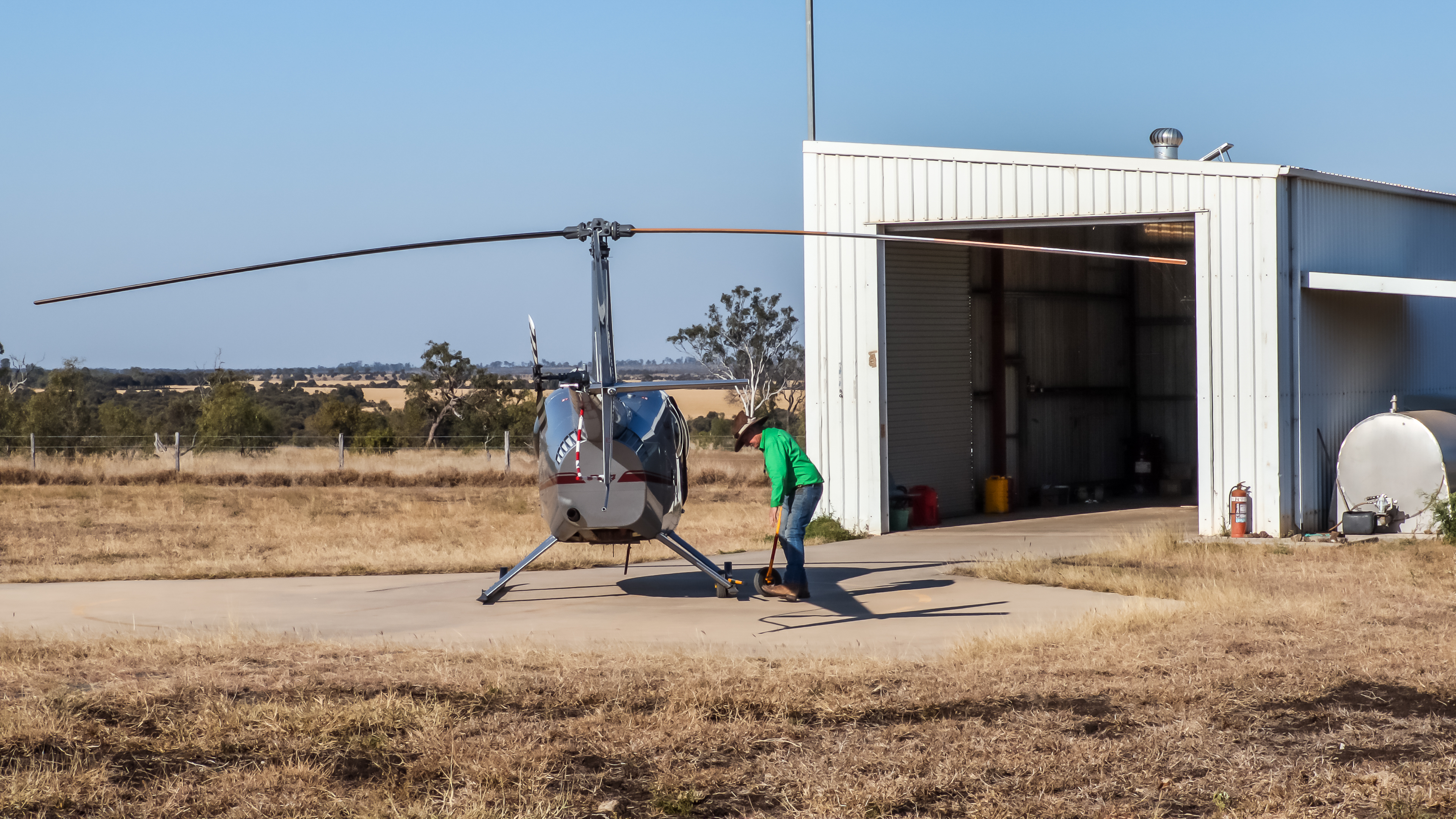
- Helicopter at the Ensham coal mine
- Interactive map of Ensham Coal Mine
- Location: Queensland, Australia
- Products: Thermal coal
- Company: Thungela Resources Limited

The Ensham Coal Mine is a coal mine located 40 km east of Emerald in Central Queensland, Australia. The Bowen Basin mine has coal reserves amounting to 1.48 billion tonnes of coking coal, one of the largest coal reserves in Australia and the world. The Ensham mine had an annual production capacity of 3.2 million tonnes of high-quality thermal coal in 2022. In 2023, the mine was sold to Thungela Resources Limited. It has approval to run until 2045.

Ensham consists of six pits on either side of the Nogoa River. Operations currently utilise the open-cut method of mining. Extraction is conducted by dragline and truck and shovel operations. A transition to underground mining is required to access the highest quality coal. Extensive rehabilitation has resulted in Ensham being the largest certified area of progressive rehabilitation in an open cut mine in Queensland.

Coal is transported to port via the Blackwater railway system. Some of the coal is fuel for Gladstone Power Station.

As thermal coal prices declined in 2012 mining operations were reduced to 40% of capacity and a further round of permanent job cuts was announced.

== Flooding ==
The mine was inundated by floods in January 2008. Two pits were left filled with water. One dragline was submerged in 15 metres of water. Total mine damages have been estimated at around $300 million. Following the precautionary construction of flood protection levees after the 2008 flood, the mine was not affected by the 2010–11 Queensland floods.

== See also ==
- Coal in Australia
- List of coal mines in Queensland
- List of mines in Australia
