= Ottaba, Queensland =

Ottaba
- Suburb
- Interactive map of Ottaba
- Coordinates: 27.1566°S 152.3844°E
- Country: Australia
- State: Queensland
- LGA: Somerset Region
- Location: 9.5 km (5.9 mi) N of Esk; 73.5 km (45.7 mi) NNW of Ipswich; 86.8 km (53.9 mi) NE of Toowoomba; 111 km (69 mi) NW of Brisbane CBD

Government
  - State electorate: Nanango
  - Federal division: Blair

Area
  - Total: 17.9 km^{2} (6.9 sq mi)

Population
  - Total: 52 (2021 census)
  - Density: 2.91/km^{2} (7.52/sq mi)
- Time zone: UTC+10:00 (AEST)
- Postcode: 4313
Suburbs around Ottaba
Toogoolawah	Toogoolawah	Mount Beppo
Biarra	Ottaba	Mount Beppo
Biarra	Biarra	Coal Creek

Ottaba is a rural locality in the Somerset Region, Queensland, Australia. In the 2021 census, Ottaba had a population of 52 people.

== Geography ==
The mountain Ottaba is in the east of the locality (27.1448°S 152.3960°E), rising to 316 metres (1,037 ft) above sea level.

The Brisbane Valley Highway enters the locality from the south (Biarra) and exits to the north (Toogoolawah).

Ottaba railway station is an abandoned railway station (27.1500°S 152.3904°E) on the dismantled Brisbane Valley railway line.

== History ==
On 26 February 1904, the Queensland Railways Department named the former railway station in the area Ottaba, which is a Wakawaka language word in the Dungibara dialect meaning come on. Anthropologist Walter Edmund Roth is believed to have suggested the name. The locality takes its name from the former railway station.

Newton Provisional School opened on 15 September 1898. In 1905, it was renamed Ottaba Provisional School. On 1 January 1909, it became Ottaba State School. It closed temporarily in 1924. It permanently closed circa 1936.

== Demographics ==
In the 2016 census, Ottaba had a population of 54 people.

In the 2021 census, Ottaba had a population of 52 people.

== Education ==
There are no schools in Ottaba. The nearest government primary and secondary schools are Toogoolawah State School and Toogoolawah State High School, both in neighbouring Toogoolawah to the north.
