= Olive Downs Complex =

Open-cut coal mine in Queensland, Australia

Coordinates: 22.139°S 148.386°E

The Olive Downs Complex is an open-cut mine for metallurgical coal in the Bowen Basin of Queensland, Australia. It is located 40 kilometres south-east of Moranbah, about 140 km south-west of Mackay. The mine is accessed via the Sheldon Bridge over the Isaac River. The mine has a production life of 80 years and is expected to deliver steelmaking coal to Japan, South Korea, India, and China.

Olive Downs is owned by Pembroke Resources. It was acquired in April 2016 from Peabody Energy by Barry Tudor, founder of Pembroke Resources for $100 million.

Once operational it will be the third largest coal mine in Queensland, producing up to 15 million tonnes a year. It has reserves of 514 million tonnes.

In September 2020 the Queensland Government granted formal approval.

Construction of the mine had begun by April 2022. Productions commenced in June 2023. Construction consisted of:

- A 19km electrified rail loop
- 24 km water pipeline
- Advanced 2 stage coal processing plant
- Multiple road and rail bridges
- 44km 66 kV electricity line and dedicated communications tower

The mine was officially opened in April 2024 with an official party consisting of Resources and Critical Minerals Minister Scott Stewart, Capricornia MP Michelle Landry, Senator Matthew Canavan, Resources opposition spokeswoman Susan McDonald and opposition Natural Resources and Mines spokesman Dale Last.

== See also ==
- Coal in Australia
- List of coal mines in Queensland
