= Perseverance Dam =

Dam in Toowoomba Region, Queensland, Australia

Perseverance Creek Dam
- Location of the dam in Queensland
- Interactive map of Perseverance Creek Dam
- Official name: Perseverance Dam
- Country: Australia
- Location: Crows Nest, Toowoomba Region, Queensland
- Coordinates: 27°17′13″S 152°07′05″E
- Purpose: Potable water supply
- Status: Operational
- Construction began: 1962
- Opening date: 1965
- Operator: Toowoomba Regional Council

Dam and spillways
- Type of dam: Rock-fill dam
- Impounds: Perseverance Creek
- Height (foundation): 53 m (174 ft)
- Length: 197 m (646 ft)
- Dam volume: 500×10^{3} m^{3} (18×10^{6} cu ft)
- Spillway type: Uncontrolled
- Spillway capacity: 1,190 m^{3}/s (42,000 cu ft/s)

Reservoir
- Creates: Lake Perseverance
- Total capacity: 30,140 ML (24,430 acre⋅ft)
- Catchment area: 110 km^{2} (42 sq mi)
- Surface area: 2.5 km^{2} (0.97 sq mi)
- Maximum water depth: 23.1 m (76 ft)
- Normal elevation: 446.08 m (1,463.5 ft) AHD

The Perseverance Creek Dam, also known as the Perseverance Dam, is a rock-fill embankment dam across Perseverance Creek, located in Crows Nest, in the Toowoomba Region of Queensland, Australia. The dam is 53 metres (174 ft) high and 197 metres (646 ft) long. The resultant 30,140-megalitre (24,430 acre⋅ft) reservoir, Lake Perseverance, is the second largest (in terms of storage capacity) and the second oldest reservoir of Toowoomba city's three water supply dams. The other two storages used for Toowoomba are Cooby Dam and Cressbrook Dam which is located downstream of Perseverance.

== History ==
Construction of this dam commenced in 1962 and was completed in 1965. Perseverance Dam is approximately 35 kilometres (22 mi) northeast of Toowoomba on Perseverance Creek, a tributary of the Cressbrook Creek.

On 4 February 1985, a Royal Australian Air Force Chinook helicopter crashed into the dam after striking a power line. The helicopter's pilot was killed, and the other three crew members were injured.

== Amenities ==
The dam has a lookout with views across the lake, picnic and barbeque facilities, playground, toilets, and walking tracks. Pets are not allowed. Water skiing and canoeing are possible through the Lake Perseverance Centre's activities program.

== See also ==
- List of dams and reservoirs in Australia
