= Kogan Creek Power Station =

Coal-fired power station in Queensland

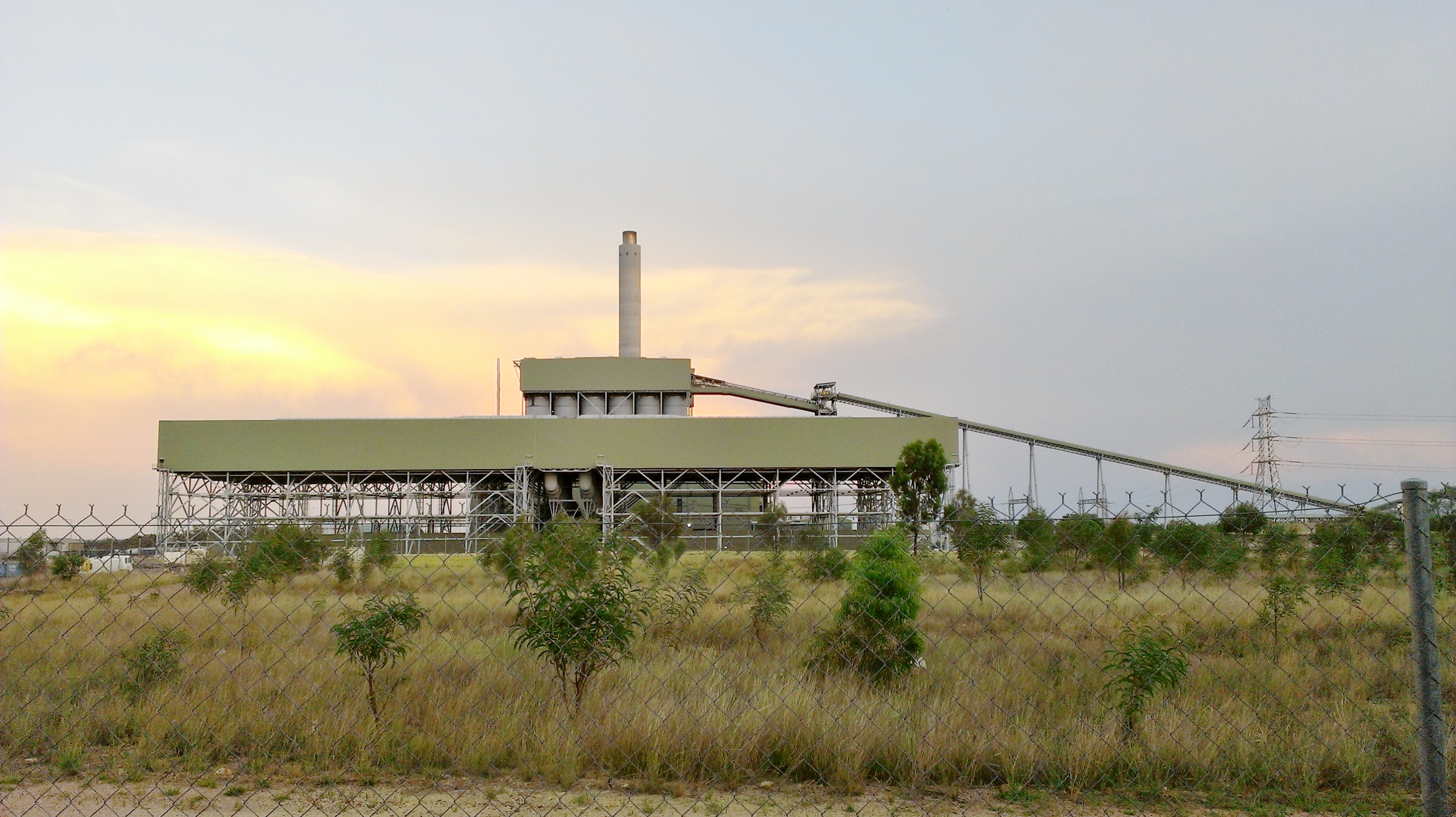
- Viewed from Observation Area
- Country: Australia
- Location: Brigalow, Queensland
- Coordinates: 26°54′59″S 150°44′57″E
- Status: Operational
- Construction began: 2004
- Commission date: 2007
- Construction cost: A$1.2 billion
- Owner: CS Energy
- Operator: CS Energy

Solar farm
- Type: CSP
- CSP technology: Fresnel reflector
- Collectors: 14
- Total collector area: 0.25 km^{2} (0.097 sq mi)

Thermal power station
- Primary fuel: Bituminous coal
- Turbine technology: Supercritical steam turbine
- Site area: 30 hectares (74 acres)
- Cooling towers: Air-cooled
- Cooling source: 3 × deep groundwater boreholes supplying 1,500 megalitres per year (53,000,000 cu ft/a)

Power generation
- Units operational: 1 × 750 MW
- Make and model: Siemens; Babcock-Hitachi (supercritical boiler)
- Units cancelled: 1 × 44 MW (Solar Boost CSP project)
- Nameplate capacity: 750 MW
- Capacity factor: 82.33% (2016–2017)
- Annual net output: 5409 GWh (2016–2017)

External links
- Website: Kogan Creek Power Station and Kogan Creek Mine

The Kogan Creek Power Station is a 750-megawatt coal fired power station owned by CS Energy on the Darling Downs in Queensland. The $1.2 billion plant is situated at Brigalow, in the Surat Basin between Dalby and Chinchilla.

== Background ==
Kogan Creek consists of only one boiler-turbine-generator unit. At 750 MW, it is the largest single unit in Australia. Construction by a consortium led by Siemens commenced in 2004 and was completed in 2007. It was opened by the Queensland Premier Anna Bligh and Minister for Mines and Energy Geoff Wilson on 27 November 2007.

The fuel source is the Kogan Creek coal deposit, which is also owned by CS Energy and will provide 2.8 million tonnes of black coal annually. The coal is delivered to the power station via a 4 km long conveyor belt. The coal mine is operated by Golding Contractors, who has a contract to run the mine until 30 June 2026.

The plant's 40% efficiency is reached using supercritical steam technology which raises the steam pressure to 250 bar at 560 °C, however the less efficient air cooling keeps the power station from reaching the 45% efficiency of power stations like Stanwell Power Station. Kogan Creek uses air-cooled surface condensers, which reduce water consumption to 90% less water through the use of dry cooling technology when compared to conventional power stations using fresh water directly.

Carbon Monitoring for Action estimates this power station emits 4.33 million tonnes of greenhouse gases each year as a result of burning coal. The Australian Government announced the introduction of a now cancelled Carbon Pollution Reduction Scheme commencing in 2010 which was expected to impact on emissions from power stations. The National Pollutant Inventory provides details of other pollutant emissions, but, as at 23 November 2008, not CO_{2}.

== Facilities ==
A 28 kilometres (17 mi), 275 kV transmission line from the Braemar Creek substation, as well as the Western Downs substation adjacent to Kogan Creek, connects the Kogan Creek power station to the National Electricity Market, providing power to Queensland and New South Wales.

Also located at the Western Downs substation are several grid battery projects; the 200 MW / 400 MWh Western Downs Green Power Hub battery with its photovoltaic 400 MW solar, the 100 MW / 200 MWh Chinchilla battery, and the 150 MW / 300 MWh Ulinda Park battery.

== Kogan Creek Solar Boost ==
In April 2011, the Kogan Creek Solar Boost project was officially launched. Funding for the project includes a $70 million commitment from CS Energy and a commitment of more than $34 million from the Australian Government, of which CS spent $50 million and ARENA spent $6.4 million. The project was to be constructed by Areva using superheated solar steam technology. Kogan Creek Solar Boost was to be the largest integration of solar technology with a coal-fired power station in the world. Construction started in 2011 and was originally scheduled for completion by 2013. Difficulties with the project and commercial issues delayed the project.

It was stated that the project, involving the installation of a CLFR solar thermal system, was capable of generating 44 MW electrical at peak solar conditions. But additional sources state that the 44 MW capacity was not additional to the full 744 MW net capacity of Kogan Creek, rather was an estimated contribution towards the total generation. Instead, steam from the solar field was to be first further heated and then used to power the intermediate pressure turbine, thereby displacing coal. The project was expected to reduce carbon emissions by about 35,000 tonnes per year, which is 0.8% of emissions, at a cost of only A$3 per tonne of carbon for the first year's emissions alone.

On 18 March 2016, CS Energy announced that the Solar Boost demonstration project would not be completed, blaming "technical and contractual problems". By 2017, the equipment was being dismantled. CS Energy recorded a $70 million impairment in its 2016 accounts because of the project.

CS Energy explained in a report to ARENA why the project was cancelled. Kogan Creek being AREVA Solar's first commercial project, compounded by the supply chain inexperience, resulted in delays and rework. Works where suspended when an alternative local supplier had to be selected. The technology design was new and not completely optimised, causing more site labour. AREVA Solar treated the economiser boiler tubes with a "Solonyx" internally developed coating. But most of the economiser boiler tubes rusted both before and after installation. AREVA Solar stopped production of that coating after that. Culminating that, in August 2014, AREVA announced its solar business exit.

Per CS Energy, the project (having no thermal conservation/storage capacity) had problems with "rapidly moving clouds". Site Manager Ian Canham noted he had observed multiple problems with Areva Solar communication and planning. Also, workers brought in from the US lacked safety training and safety gear. On the supply side, after sitting in 2011 floodwaters at the Port of Brisbane during a dispute between Areva and shipping company DHL, 80 per cent of pipes for the project were damaged by rust. Other steel ordered for the project was completely unusable and had to be scrapped. Some necessary parts became unavailable when a Newcastle supplier went out of business.

== See also ==
- Coal mining in Australia
- Energy policy of Australia
- List of active power stations in Queensland
- Solar power in Australia
- List of largest power stations in the world
