= Biarra, Queensland =

Biarra
- Suburb
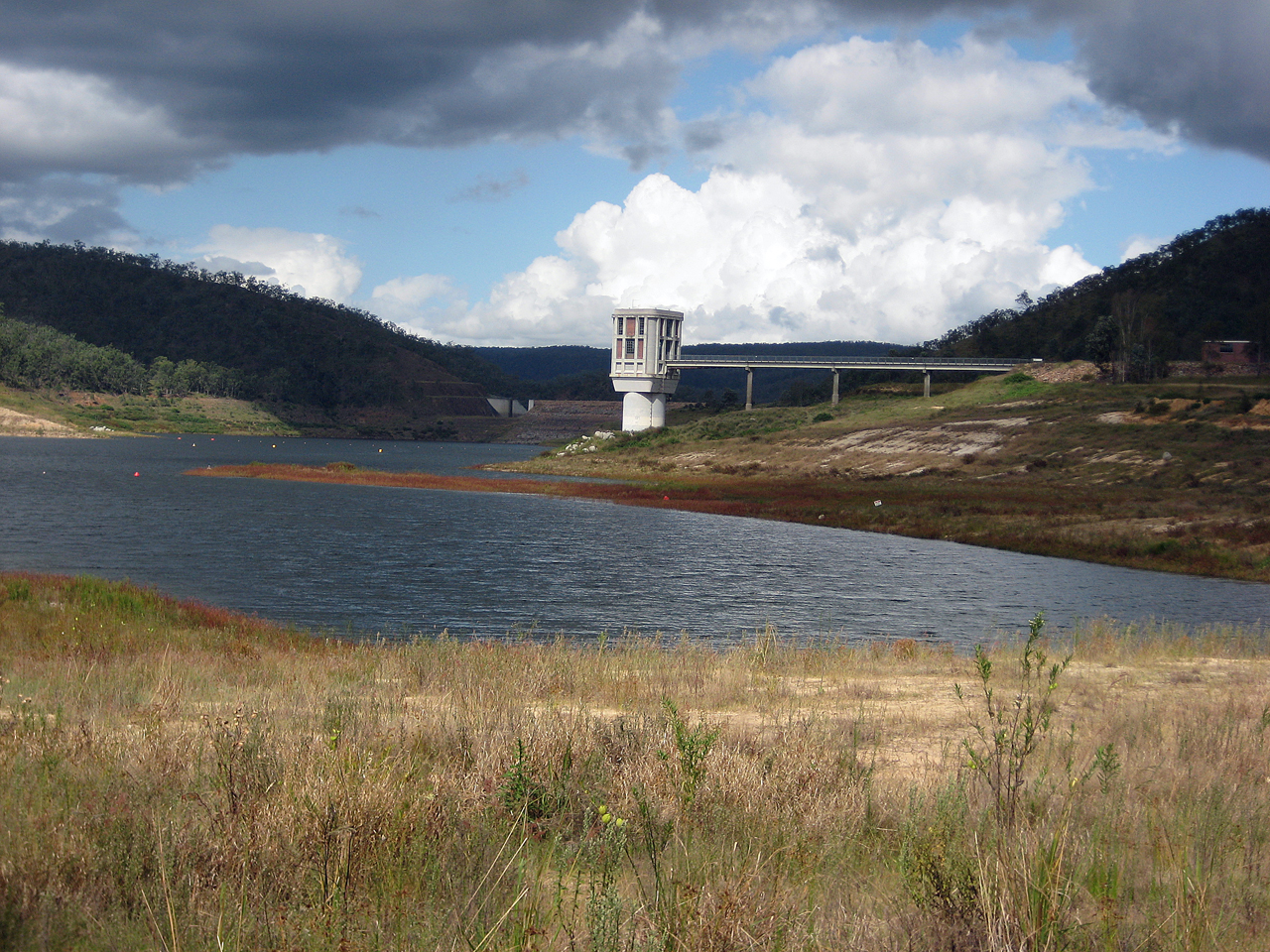
- Lake Cressbrook, only 12 percent full, 2008

- Interactive map of Biarra
- Coordinates: 27.1986°S 152.3344°E
- Country: Australia
- State: Queensland
- LGA: Somerset Region
- Location: 10.9 km (6.8 mi) SW of Toogoolawah; 17.5 km (10.9 mi) NW of Esk; 36.7 km (22.8 mi) NE of Crows Nest; 80.3 km (49.9 mi) NE of Toowoomba; 119 km (74 mi) NW of Brisbane

Government
  - State electorate: Nanango
  - Federal division: Blair

Area
  - Total: 234.8 km^{2} (90.7 sq mi)

Population
  - Total: 270 (2021 census)
  - Density: 1.150/km^{2} (2.98/sq mi)
- Time zone: UTC+10:00 (AEST)
- Postcode: 4313
Suburbs around Biarra
Eskdale	Ivory Creek	Toogoolawah
Cressbrook Creek	Biarra	Ottaba; Coal Creek
Ravensbourne	Redbank Creek	Esk

Biarra is a rural locality in the Somerset Region, Queensland, Australia. In the 2021 census, Biarra had a population of 270 people.

== Geography ==
Cressbrook Creek flows through the locality from the south-west (the locality of Cressbrook Creek) to the north-east (Toogoolawah); it is a tributary of the Brisbane River.

The north-east of the locality is at elevation 110 metres (360 ft) while th south-west of the locality is mountainous with several named peaks (from west to east):

- Perkins Knob (384 metres (1,260 ft))
- Mount Sevastopol (557 metres (1,827 ft))
- The Sugar Loaf (376 metres (1,234 ft))
- Mount Deongwar (548 metres (1,798 ft))
- Mount Tin Tin (394 metres (1,293 ft))
- Eskvale (296 metres (971 ft))
- Horse Mountain (310 metres (1,020 ft))

The Cressbrook Dam is in the south-west of the locality, impounding Cressbrook Creek and creating Lake Cressbrook. Although within the Somerset Region, the dam exists to supply drinking water to Toowoomba and surrounding areas in the Toowoomba Region, west of the Great Dividing Range.

Below the dam is the Deongwar State Forest, a protected area, which extends into the neighbouring locality of Redbank Creek.

== History ==
The locality name Biarra comes from the parish name, which in turn is a word in the Waka language meaning plentiful supply of fish, presumably in Cressbrook Creek.

In 1841 David Cannon McConnel established a pastoral property called Cressbrook Station.

In 1872, copper was found in the Biarra and Cressbrook Creek district and a number of mines were established. However, the boom was over by 1874. Mining resumed in 1895 for some years but it was not successful. In 1912 there was an attempt at coal mining and in 1933 there was quarrying of limestone, but neither were successful.

By 1883, a cricket team had formed in Biarra.

The Queensland Government sold town allotments in Biarra in January 1887. However, the construction of the Brisbane Valley railway including the Toogoolawah railway station in 1904 to service the Cressbrook condensed milk factory and the subsequent sale of town allotments in Toogoolawah made Toogoolawah the preferred town in the area and Biarra failed to develop further. The town of Biarra no longer officially exists but a cluster of houses (27.0612°S 152.3837°E) and the Biarra cemetery (27.0574°S 152.3794°E, now known as the Toogoolawah Cemetery) remain, but they are not within the present day boundaries of the locality of Biarra but rather within the locality of Braemore.

Following a public meeting in February 1887, a school committee was established to obtain a school for the district. By May 1887 the £110 required towards the cost of the school building and furnishings had been raised. Tenders were called to build the school in June 1887. In August 1887, the Governor approved the construction of the school by contractor H. Day. However, there were days in constructing the school due to flooding. Biarra State School opened on 1 May 1888 in the farming district of Biarra (not in the town) on the ridge of a hill on the then Main Eskdale Road. The first teacher was Mr T Shaw. In late 1889 a library opened in conjunction with the school. The school closed in 1929. The teacher's residence was sold in 1939, but the school building continued to be used for other occasional purposes, such as a polling station until at least 1948, but was removed by 1952.

In 1889, town lots were offered in the town of Eskdale (27.159°S 152.315°E) but did not sell well. Despite the official name of Eskdale, the local residents referred to it as Biarra, perhaps reinforced by the presence of the Biarra Hall and the Biarra State School in the same area. The town of Eskdale no longer officially exists but there are a few houses still at that location (which is within the present day locality of Biarra and not within the locality of Eskdale).

As railways developed, dairying became possible as a means to get the milk and other products quickly to markets. The Brisbane Valley was well-suited to dairying. In late 1894 a creamery was opened in Biarra. By 1895 it was processing 200 imperial gallons (910 L) per day.

In 1897, Biarra farmers established a Mutual Improvement Society.

In October 1912, following the Boer War and the 1912 Brisbane general strike, led to development of local volunteer militia. Twelve local men formed the Biarra patrol of the Stanley Legion of Frontiersmen was formed in October 1912 under the leadership of Ernest Frederick Lord, a local grazier.

On 18 December 1912, the Biarra Public Hall opened alongside Cressbrook Creek in the Biarra Recreation Grounds, where there was already a tennis and cricket pitch. (Again this development occurred at the officially-named town of Eskdale). As 1988, the hall was still standing due to volunteer maintenance by "Khaki" Drew.

Tenders were called in September 1924 for the erection of a school at Sandy Gully. Sandy Gully State School was opened on 4 June 1925. It was officially opened in September 1925 by Frederick Lancelot Nott, the local Member of the Queensland Legislative Assembly. It closed 5 July 1959. It was located at approx 22 Wells Station Road (27.1238°S 152.3303°E).

In 1935, a football team was established in Biarra by Dudley Parry Burton de Burgh Persse of Eskdale Station.

The Cressbrook Dam was built in 1983.

== Demographics ==
In the 2016 census, Biarra had a population of 257 people.

In the 2021 census, Biarra had a population of 270 people.

== Education ==
There are no schools in Biarra. The nearest government primary schools are Toogoolawah State School in neighbouring Toogoolawah to the north, Esk State School in neighbouring Esk to the east, and Crow's Nest State School in Crows Nest to the south-west. The nearest government secondary schools are Toogoolawah State HIgh School (to Year 12) in Toogoolawah, Crow's Nest State School (to Year 10) in Crows Nest, and Highfields State Secondary College in Highfields to the south-west.
