= Cooby Dam =

Dam in Queensland, Australia

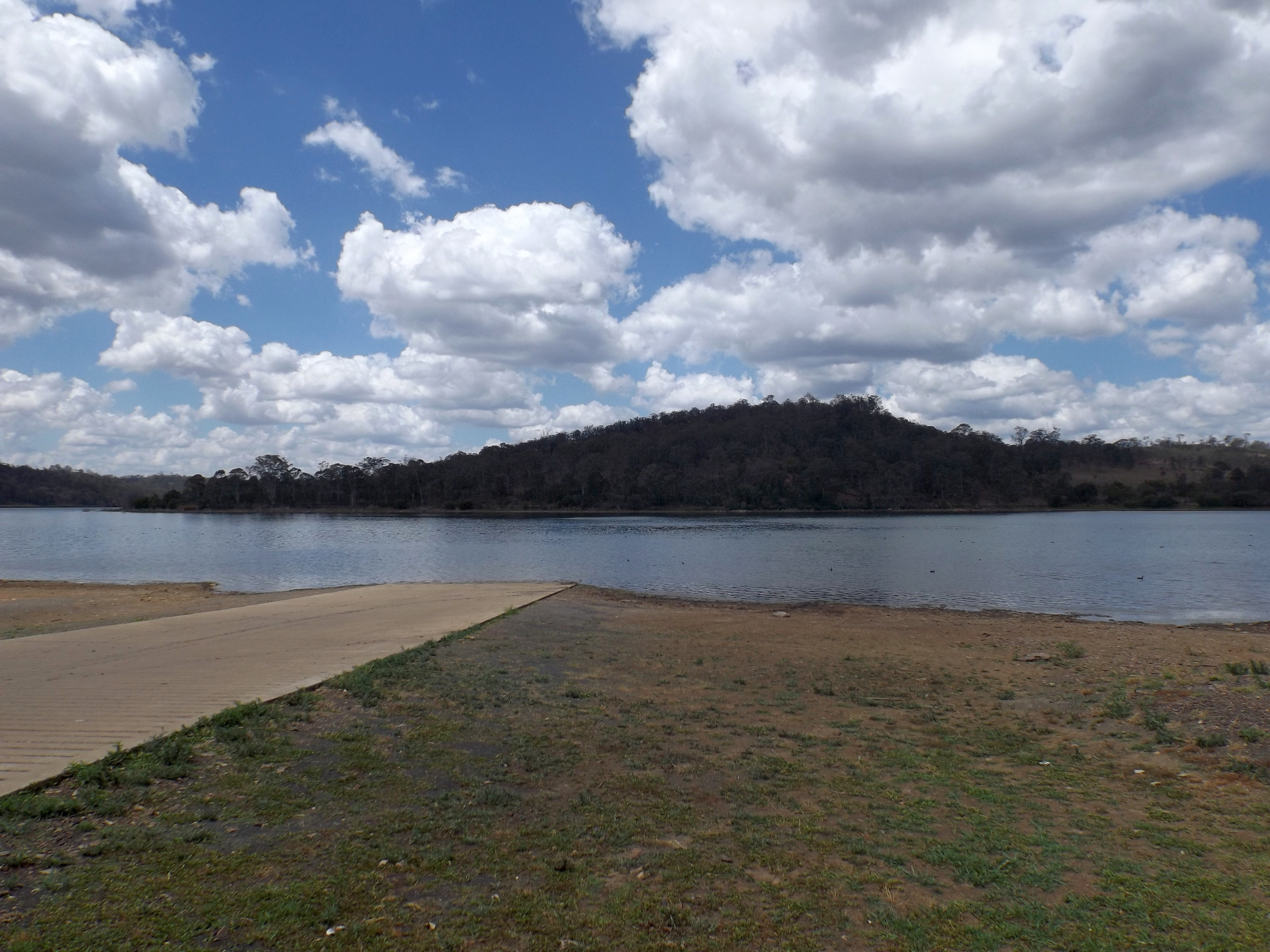
- Boat ramp, 2014

- Location of the Cooby Dam in Queensland
- Country: Australia
- Location: Darling Downs, Queensland
- Coordinates: 27°23′09″S 151°56′24″E
- Purpose: Potable water supply
- Status: Operational
- Construction began: 1938
- Opening date: 1942
- Operator: Toowoomba Region Council

Dam and spillways
- Type of dam: Rock-fill dam
- Impounds: Cooby Creek
- Height: 32 m (105 ft)
- Length: 207 m (679 ft)
- Dam volume: 71×10^{3} m^{3} (2.5×10^{6} cu ft)
- Spillway type: Uncontrolled
- Spillway capacity: 680 m^{3}/s (24,000 cu ft/s)

Reservoir
- Creates: Cooby Creek Reservoir
- Total capacity: 23,100 ML (18,700 acre⋅ft)
- Active capacity: 19,703 ML (15,973 acre⋅ft)
- Inactive capacity: 1,462 ML (1,185 acre⋅ft)
- Catchment area: 159–169 km^{2} (61–65 sq mi)
- Surface area: 301 ha (740 acres)
- Maximum water depth: 12.5 m (41 ft)
- Normal elevation: 482 m (1,581 ft) AHD

The Cooby Dam is a rock–fill embankment dam with an un–gated spillway across the Cooby Creek, a tributary of Condamine River, located at Groomsville in the Toowoomba Region on the Darling Downs, Queensland, Australia. The main purpose of the dam is for potable water supply of the Toowoomba region. The impounded reservoir is called the Cooby Creek Reservoir.

== Location and features ==
The dam is approximately 17 kilometres (11 mi) north of Toowoomba. The other two storages used for Toowoomba are Perseverance Dam and Cressbrook Dam.

Completed in 1942, the rock–fill dam structure is 32 metres (105 ft) high and 207 metres (679 ft) long. The 71-thousand-cubic-metre (2.5×10^{6} cu ft) dam wall holds back the 23,100-megalitre (18,700 acre⋅ft) reservoir when at full capacity. From a catchment area of 169 square kilometres (65 sq mi), the dam creates an unnamed reservoir, with a surface area of 301 hectares (740 acres) at a maximum depth of 12.5 metres (41 ft) when at full capacity. The uncontrolled un-gated spillway has a discharge capacity of 680 cubic metres per second (24,000 cu ft/s). The dam is managed by the Toowoomba Region Council.

Cooby Dam's lowest usable storage volume was recorded at 8% in January 2010.

In July 2006, public outcry and a referendum with winning "No" vote rejected plans to place recycled water into Cooby Dam. In 2007, the idea was again resurrected when plans for an advanced water treatment plant to be built near Cooby Dam by the Toowoomba City Council were suggested. The trial would test the re-use of recycled water into Toowoomba's drinking water supply. In 2008, an emergency bore was used to extract water from the Great Artesian Basin to supplement water supplies for the dam as drought conditions reduced supply to critical levels.

== Recreational activities ==
A stocked impoundment permit is required to fish in the dam.

Darling Downs Sailing Club uses the dam.

== See also ==
- List of dams in Queensland
