= Kogan Creek Mine =

Coordinates: 26°56′1″S 150°47′11″E

The Kogan Creek Mine is an open-cut coal mine located 15 kilometres (km) south of the township of Brigalow in the Darling Downs region of Queensland, Australia. The mine is owned by CS Energy and lies in the Surat Basin. It provides about 2.5 million tonnes of coal annually via a four km conveyor belt to the nearby Kogan Creek Power Station.

Kogan Creek Mine is operated by Golding who also completed the initial construction in 2006. About 70 people are employed by the mine.

== See also ==
- Coal in Australia
- List of coal mines in Queensland
