= Dawson coal mine =

Coordinates: 24.587°S 150.046°E

The Dawson coal mine is an open-cut coal mine south-east of Moura in Central Queensland, Australia. The mine includes three mining areas; Dawson North, Dawson Central and Dawson South that share common infrastructure. The Dawson coal mine lies in the Baralaba Coal Measures of the Bowen Basin.

Coking, soft coking and thermal coal have all been produced at the mine. Anglo American has owned the mine since mid-2002. Mining in the area began in 1961 in what was known as the Moura Mine. The mine was the first to export a shipment of Queensland's coking coal to Japan. It was also the first mine to introduce draglines into its operation in 1963.

The coal is exported by Gladstone to the Barney Point and R G Tanna coal terminals. Dawson coal mine has implemented an extensive rehabilitation program.

== See also ==
- Coal in Australia
- List of coal mines in Queensland
