= CS Energy =

Australian electricity generating company

- Type: Government-owned corporation
- Industry: Energy
- Founded: 1997
- Headquarters: Brisbane, Australia
- Area served: Queensland
- Key people: Brian Gillespie; CEO; Tony Bellas; Chairman
- Products: Electricity
- Revenue: $2 billion (2024)
- Net income: ($58 million) (2024)
- Number of employees: 500+
- Parent: Government of Queensland
- Website: www.csenergy.com.au
- Footnotes; Annual Report 30 June 2024 CS Energy

CS Energy is an Australia-based electricity generating company fully owned by the Government of Queensland with its head office located in Fortitude Valley, Brisbane. The company was established in 1997 and employs more than 700 staff.

The company's generation portfolio comprises coal-fired power stations, energy storage and renewable energy offtakes.

As at 2023, CS Energy is adding the 100 MW/200 MWh Chinchilla Battery grid-scale battery to its Kogan Creek site on the Western Downs.

CS Energy was awarded A$32 million in 2010 to help construct Australia's first large-scale solar thermal project at Kogan Creek Power Station. Funding was provided by the Rudd Government under the Renewable Energy Demonstration Program. However, in March 2016, it was announced that CS Energy would 'pull the plug' on that project.

In 2020, Stanwell and CS Energy were accused of driving up prices by creating an artificial lack of supply.

== Assets ==
Major assets owned by CS Energy include:

- Callide Power Station
- Kogan Creek Power Station and Kogan Creek Mine
- Chinchilla Battery (operational)
- Greenbank Battery (under construction)

== Management ==
Martin Moore was the CEO in 2017. Andrew Bills was appointed as CEO in 2018 and resigned in February 2023 following his appointment as CEO of SA Power Networks. Darren Busine was appointed as the new permanent CEO in June 2023.

In June 2023, Jim Soorley resigned as Chairman of CS Energy. Queensland Energy Minister Mick de Brenni confirmed Soorley “has made the decision” to leave the role he has held since 2015 and will be replaced by CS Energy director Adam Aspinall.

== See also ==
- List of active power stations in Queensland
- National Electricity Market
