= Cressbrook Dam =

Dam in Darling Downs, Queensland, Australia

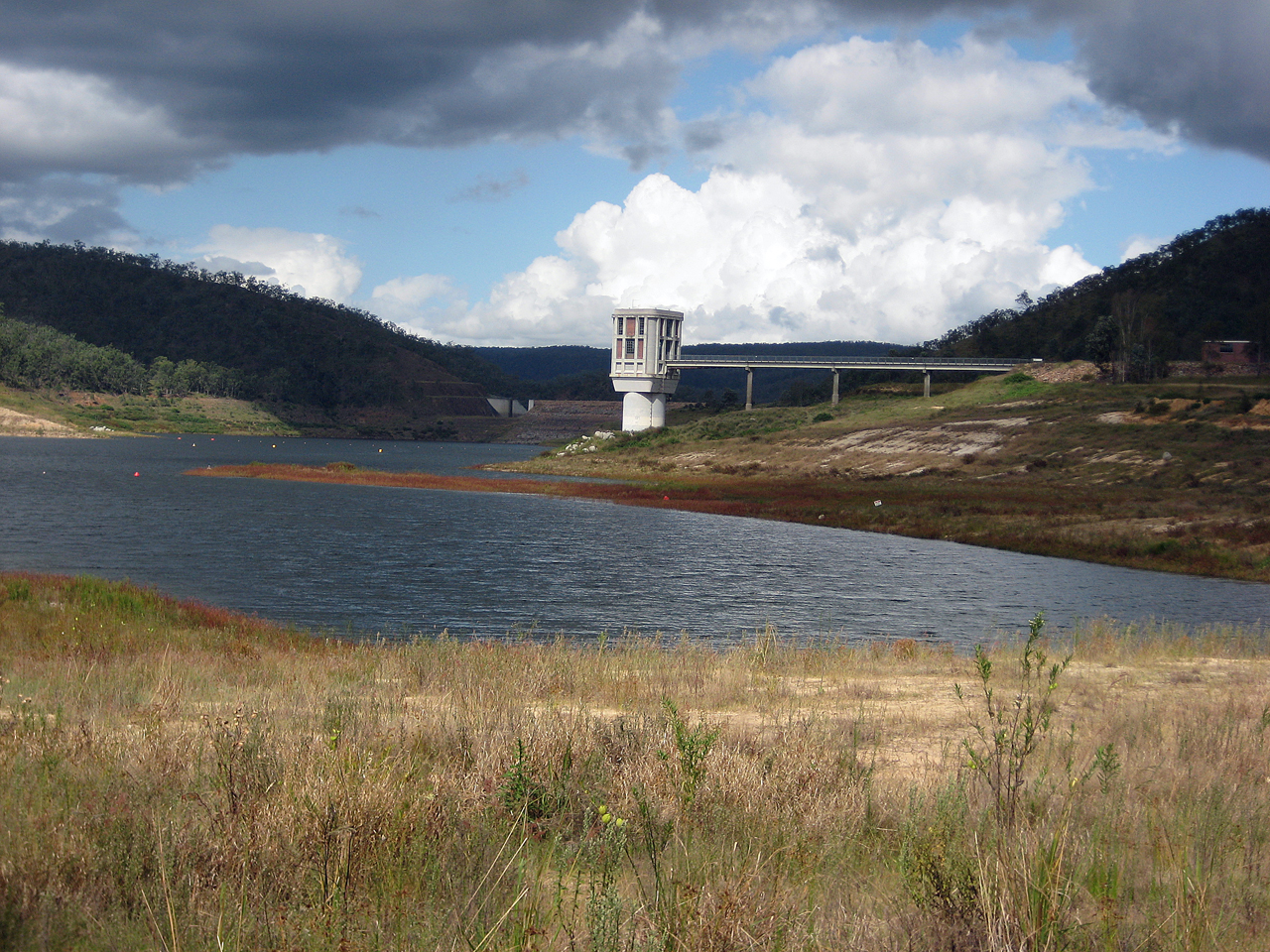
- The dam wall and reservoir in 2008; at 12% of capacity

- Location of the dam in Queensland
- Interactive map of Cressbrook Dam
- Country: Australia
- Location: Biarra, Somerset Region, Queensland
- Coordinates: 27°15′50″S 152°12′30″E
- Purpose: Water supply
- Status: Operational
- Opening date: 1983
- Built by: Abigroup
- Operator: Toowoomba Regional Council

Dam and spillways
- Type of dam: Earth fill dam
- Impounds: Cressbrook Creek
- Height (foundation): 59 m (194 ft)
- Length: 363 m (1,191 ft)
- Dam volume: 1,578×10^{3} m^{3} (55.7×10^{6} cu ft)
- Spillway capacity: 1,140 m^{3}/s (40,000 cu ft/s)

Reservoir
- Creates: Lake Cressbrook
- Total capacity: 81,840 ML (66,350 acre⋅ft)
- Active capacity: 78,700 ML (63,800 acre⋅ft)
- Catchment area: 321 km^{2} (124 sq mi)
- Surface area: 5.17 km^{2} (2.00 sq mi)
- Maximum water depth: 34 m (112 ft)
- Normal elevation: 277 m (909 ft) AHD

The Cressbrook Dam is an earth-filled embankment dam across Cressbrook Creek, 33 kilometres (21 mi) north-east of Toowoomba in the locality of Biarra in the Somerset Region of Queensland, Australia. Completed in 1983, the resultant reservoir, Lake Cressbrook, is one of three storages used to supply potable water to Toowoomba and the surrounding region. The dam is operated by the Toowoomba Regional Council.

== Overview ==
The dam is 59 metres (194 ft) high and 363 metres (1,191 ft) long. When full, the impounded reservoir, Lake Cressbrook, has a capacity of 818,140 megalitres (663,280 acre⋅ft), of which 78,700 megalitres (63,800 acre⋅ft) are usable. The reservoir covers 517 hectares (1,280 acres) at an average depth of 15.8 metres (52 ft) and draws from a 321-square-kilometre (124 sq mi) catchment area.

The catchment contains Perseverance Dam, that also supplies potable water to Toowoomba, which is located 10 kilometres (6.2 mi) upstream of Cressbrook Dam. Cooby Dam also supplies water to Toowoomba.

In 2022, it was suggested that a pumped-storage hydroelectric project be added to the dam, to generate 400 megawatts (540,000 hp) / 4 gigawatt-hours (14 TJ).

== Fishing ==
A Stocked Impoundment Permit is required to fish in the dam.
