= Caboonbah, Queensland =

Caboonbah
- Suburb
- Interactive map of Caboonbah
- Coordinates: 27.1399°S 152.4761°E
- Country: Australia
- State: Queensland
- LGA: Somerset Region
- Location: 16.8 km (10.4 mi) SE of Toogoolawah; 17.3 km (10.7 mi) NE of Esk; 96.7 km (60.1 mi) NW of Brisbane CBD

Government
  - State electorate: Nanango
  - Federal division: Blair

Area
  - Total: 8.3 km^{2} (3.2 sq mi)

Population
  - Total: 13 (2021 census)
  - Density: 1.57/km^{2} (4.06/sq mi)
- Time zone: UTC+10:00 (AEST)
- Postcode: 4312
Suburbs around Caboonbah
Mount Beppo	Lake Wivenhoe	Lake Wivenhoe
Mount Beppo	Caboonbah	Lake Wivenhoe
Coal Creek	Lake Wivenhoe	Lake Wivenhoe

Caboonbah is a rural locality in the Somerset Region, Queensland, Australia. In the 2021 census, Caboonbah had a population of 13 people.

== Geography ==
The locality is bounded to the south by Lake Wivenhoe and to the east and north by the Brisbane River.

The Esk Kilcoy Road passes through the locality, entering from the south-west (Coal Creek) and exiting to the north-east (the locality of Lake Wivenhoe).

== History ==
The locality name derives from the Caboonbah Homestead built by Henry Plantagenet Somerset. The name derives from the Kabi language "cabon gibbah" meaning big rock.

Caboonbah Homestead was built in 1889-90 for grazier Henry Plantagenet Somerset and his wife Katherine Rose (née McConnel) and their family. It was added to the Queensland Heritage Register on 12 December 1996. It was destroyed by fire in 2009 and removed from the Queensland Heritage Register in 2014. Caboonbah Homestead was on Esk-Kilcoy Road, now with the neighbouring locality of Lake Wivenhoe.

Caboonbah Undenominational Church is a union church. It was established by Henry Plantagenet Somerset and takes its name, "Caboonbah", from the Somerset family homestead, Caboonbah Homestead, nearby. The wooden structure was designed by Somerset's wife Katherine Rose Somerset, the daughter of David Cannon McConnell and Mary McConnel (nee McLeod) who founded the Cressbrook Homestead. The church was built by Lars Andersen. It opened in 1905 to serve the local farming community. It is located on Cressbrook-Caboonbah Road (27.13412°S 152.46732°E), now within the neighbouring locality of Mount Beppo.

== Demographics ==
In the 2016 census, Caboonbah had a population of 14 people.

In the 2021 census, Caboonbah had a population of 13 people.

== Education ==
There are no schools in Caboonbah. The nearest government primary and secondary schools are Toogoolawah State School and Toogoolawah State High School respectively, both in Toogoolawah to the north-west.
