= Mount Beppo, Queensland =

Mount Beppo
- Suburb
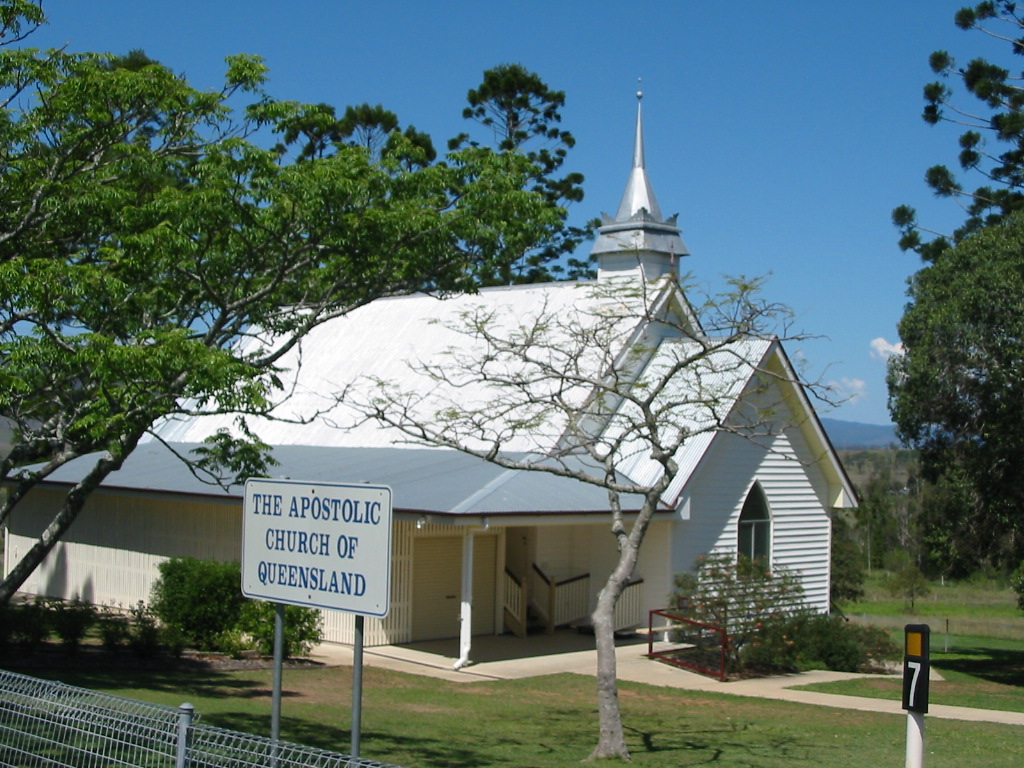
- Apostolic Church, Mount Beppo, 2005

- Interactive map of Mount Beppo
- Coordinates: 27.1233°S 152.4344°E
- Country: Australia
- State: Queensland
- City: Somerset Region
- LGA: Somerset Region
- Location: 9.3 km (5.8 mi) SE of Toogoolawah; 16.7 km (10.4 mi) N of Esk; 105 km (65 mi) NW of Brisbane
- Established: early 1880s

Government
  - State electorate: Nanango
  - Federal division: Blair

Area
  - Total: 49.4 km^{2} (19.1 sq mi)

Population
  - Total: 251 (2021 census)
  - Density: 5.081/km^{2} (13.16/sq mi)
- Time zone: UTC+10:00 (AEST)
- Postcode: 4313
Suburbs around Mount Beppo
Toogoolawah	Cressbrook	Cressbrook
Toogoolawah	Mount Beppo	Cooeeimbardi
Ottaba	Coal Creek	Caboonbah

Mount Beppo is a rural locality in the Somerset Region, Queensland, Australia. In the 2021 census, Mount Beppo had a population of 251 people.

== Geography ==
The Brisbane River forms the north-eastern boundary.

The Brisbane Valley Highway passes to the west.

== History ==
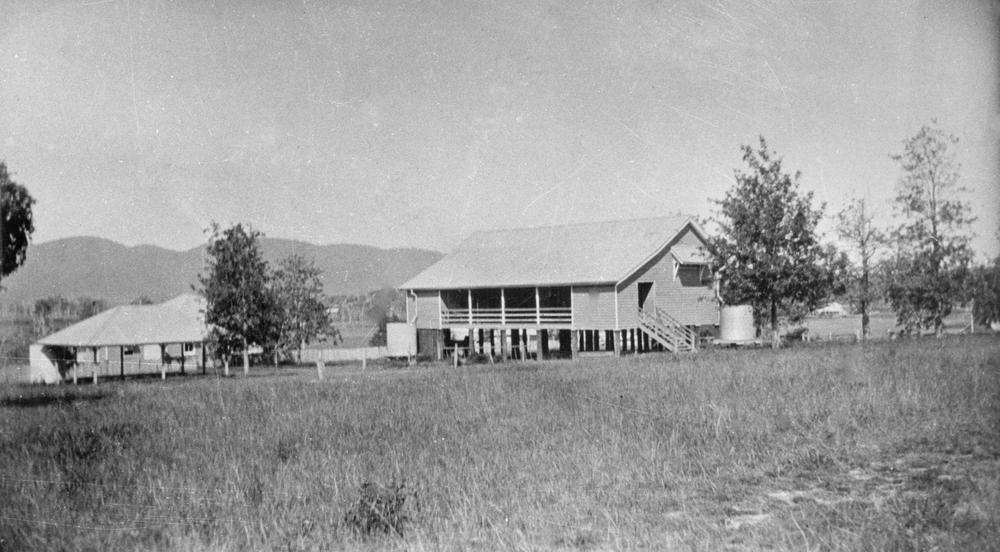
Mount Beppo State School (now closed)

The district takes its name from the neighbouring mountain, whose name in turn is believed to be derived from the Yuggera word bippo meaning mountain. However, as Yuggera is not a local indigenous language, it may have been Europeans who introduced the name.

The district was first settled in the early 1880s; the Granzein and Soden families were among the early pioneers.

Mount Beppo State School opened on 4 September 1893. The chairman of the school was Henry Plantagenet Somerset. In 1929 the school had about 80 pupils. The school closed on 31 December 1972. It was at 13 German Reserve Road (27.1321°S 152.4538°E).

By 1929, there were two churches at Mount Beppo, the Lutheran church and the Apostolic church, both with associated cemeteries.

The Lutheran Church was opened on 12 August 1888. It was extended and re-dedicated in 1930.

The first Apostolic Church services were held in 1883 in the home of Mr Carl Casper Meier and the church building was constructed about 1889, but in 1911 the building was relocated higher up the hill and extended. Further extensions occurred at part of the golden jubilee celebrations in 1934. In 2014, only the Apostolic Church remains, but both cemeteries still exist.

The district was known for its brass band, which was established in 1898 and celebrated its golden jubilee in 1949.

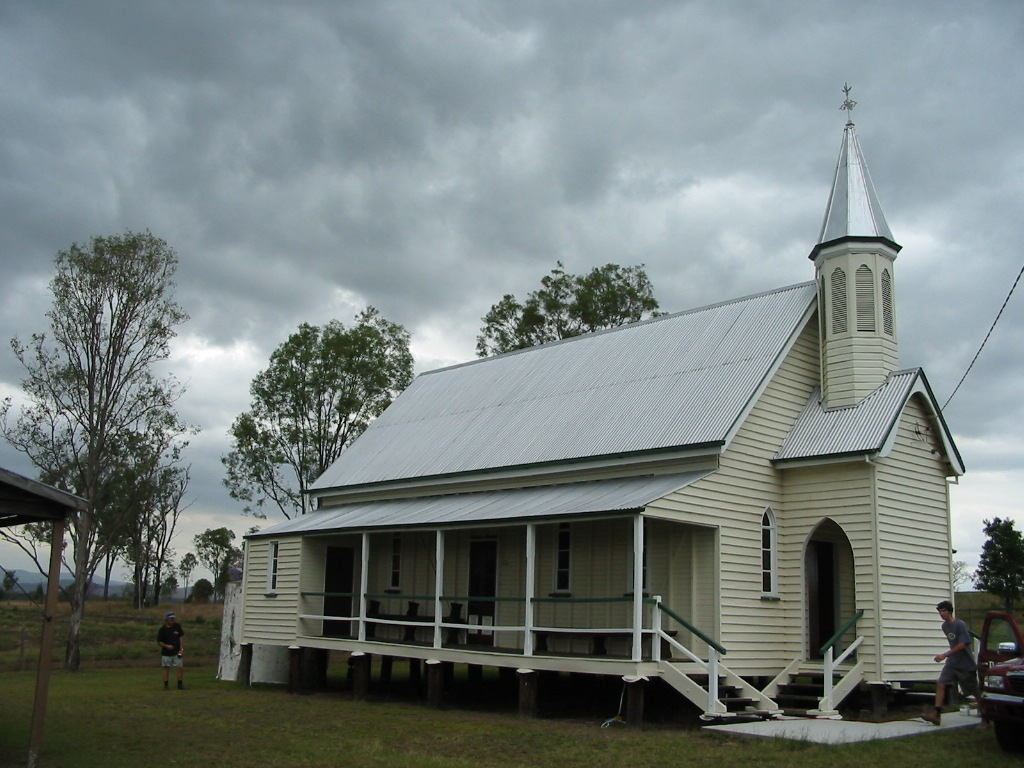
Caboonbah Undenominational Church, 2005

Caboonbah Undenominational Church is a union church. It was established by Henry Plantagenet Somerset and takes its name, "Caboonbah", from the Somerset family homestead, Caboonbah Homestead, nearby. The wooden structure was designed by Somerset's wife Katherine Rose Somerset, the daughter of David Cannon McConnell and Mary McConnel (nee McLeod) who founded the Cressbrook Homestead. The church was built by Lars Andersen. It opened in 1905 to serve the local farming community. It is located on Cressbrook-Caboonbah Road (27.13412°S 152.46732°E).

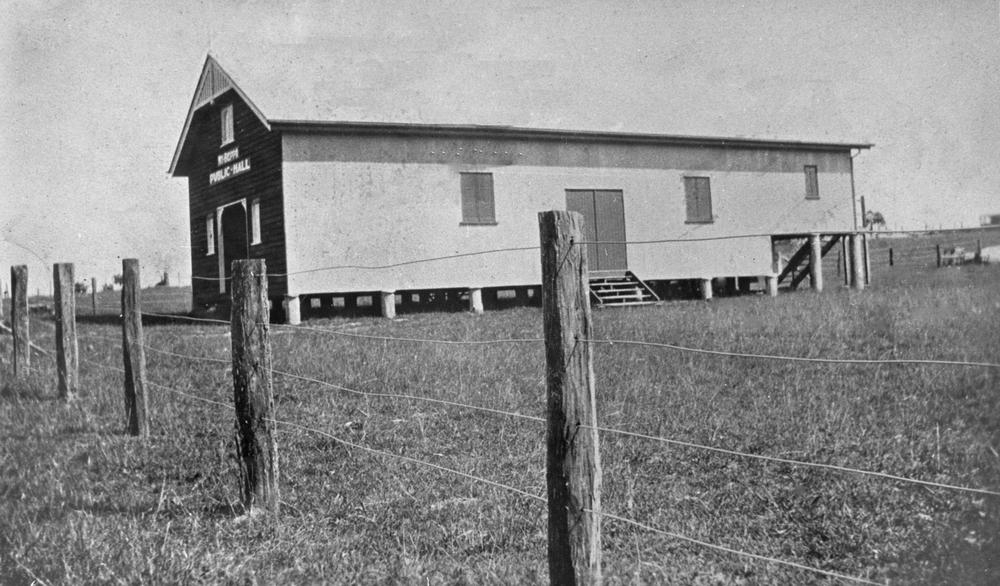
Mount Beppo public hall

A public hall was opened at Mount Beppo on 15 March 1930 by Henry Plantagenet Somerset, former Member of the Legislative Assembly for the district, with the then current Member, Ernest Grimstone, in attendance.

== Demographics ==
In the 2011 census, Mount Beppo had a population of 347 people.

In the 2016 census, Mount Beppo had a population of 216 people.

In the 2021 census, Mount Beppo had a population of 251 people.

== Education ==
There are no schools in Mount Beppo. The nearest government primary school is Toogoolawah State School in neighbouring Toogoolawah to the north-west. The nearest government secondary school is Toogoolawah State High School, also in Toogoolawah.
