= Caboonbah =

Caboonbah may refer to:

- Caboonbah, Queensland, a locality in the Somerset Region, Queensland, Australia
- Caboonbah Homestead, a former homestead in Lake Wivenhoe, Somerset Region, Queensland, Australia
- Caboonbah Undenominational Church, a church in the Somerset Region, Queensland, Australia
