= Mary McConnel =

Mary McConnel may refer to:

- Mary McConnel (pioneer) (1824–1910), a Scottish settler in Australia who founded the Royal Children's Hospital, Brisbane
  - Mary MacLeod Banks (née McConnel; 1861–1951), her daughter, a British-Australian folklorist
  - Mary McConnel School, an Anglican school in Brisbane, Queensland, named after her
