= Henry Plantagenet Somerset =

Australian politician (1852–1936)

Henry Somerset
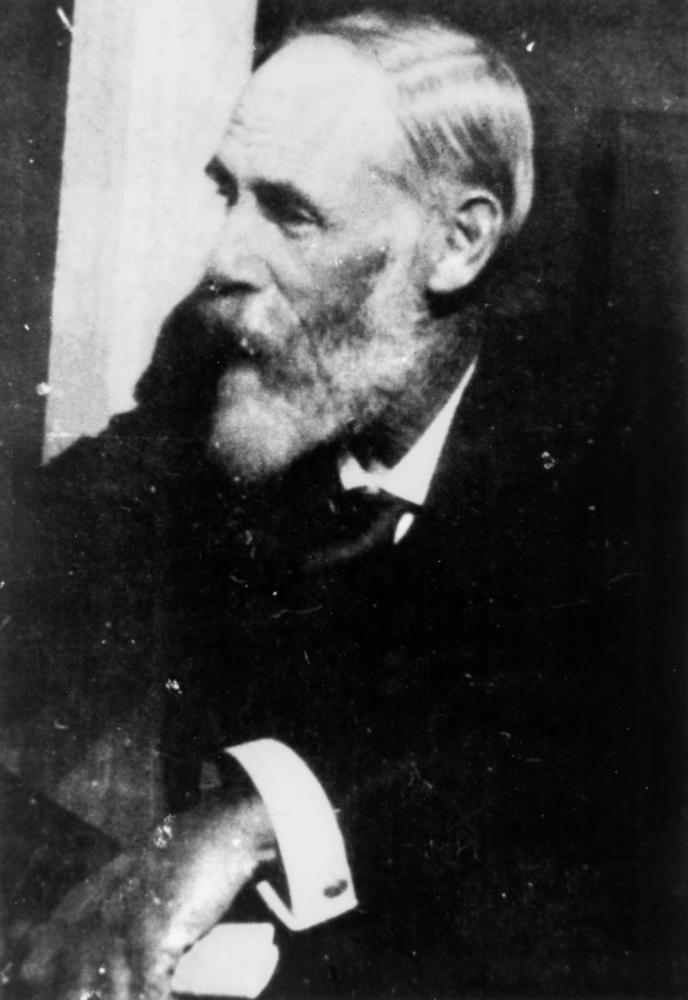
- Henry Plantagenet Somerset

Member of the Queensland Legislative Assembly for Stanley
- In office 27 August 1904 – 9 October 1920
- Preceded by: William Summerville
- Succeeded by: Frederick Nott

Personal details
- Born: Henry Plantagenet Somerset; 19 May 1852 Fort Armstrong, Kaffraria, Eastern Cape (now South Africa)
- Died: 11 April 1936 (aged 83) Caboonbah, Queensland, Australia
- Resting place: Caboonbah Undenominational Church Cemetery
- Party: Ministerial
- Other political affiliations: Liberal Party, National
- Spouse: Katherine Rose McConnel
- Occupation: Grazier

Henry Plantagenet Somerset (19 May 1852 – 11 April 1936) was a pioneer pastoralist and politician in Queensland, Australia. Somerset was a liberal politician who represented the district of Stanley in the Queensland Legislative Assembly from 1904 to 1920, and canvassed successfully for the extension of the Brisbane Valley railway through the Brisbane River Valley to the rich timber reserves in the Blackbutt Range and beyond. Both the Somerset Dam and the local government area of Somerset Region are named in his honour.

== Early life ==
H. P. Somerset's family claimed descent from John of Gaunt and Katherine Swynford through the Beaufort line. Henry was the second son of Colonel Charles Henry Somerset and Christina Emma Thompson and was born at Fort Armstrong in Kaffraria, Cape Colony (now South Africa) on 19 May 1852 where his father was a serving officer with the 72nd Highlanders.

In 1855, his family moved to India, and remained until the Sepoy Mutiny in 1857 after which his mother returned to England with her four young children. They were cared for by relatives until Henry's father returned in ill health and both his parents died in 1863 when Henry was 11. The following year Henry Somerset was sent to Wellington College by his guardian, General Edward Somerset, where he remained until he was 18, excelling at sport, music and art. Wellington College had been established by Queen Victoria for the education of her army's orphans in 1859 and Henry's years there provide the most joyous chapters of his autobiography.

== Farming in Queensland ==
On the advice of Charles Grant Tindal, with whom Henry shared a love of thoroughbred horses, Henry paid £40 for passage to Queensland as a sailor-passenger on the wooden barque Polmaise and a land order for 40 acres. On arrival he met William Bowman, manager of Mount Brisbane Station on part of which the township of Esk was built and accompanied him to New South Wales. Henry returned to Queensland and worked for David Cannon McConnel, from 1872 to 1874, at Cressbrook Station. He established Mount Marlow Station for James Henry McConnel in 1875 where his head stockman was James MacPherson the bushranger, known as the Wild Scotsman, after his release from prison.

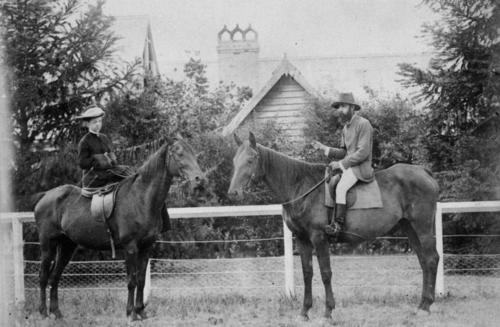
Katharine Rose McConnel and Henry Plantagenet Somerset at Cressbrook Station

Mount Marlow station was sold in 1877 and Henry returned to England in December 1878 on the Whampoa after having proposed to Katharine Rose McConnel, daughter of David Cannon McConnel on the top of Mount Coot-tha.

They were married at the British Legation in Berne, Switzerland, in 1879 and returned to Cressbrook for the birth of their first daughter. Henry then purchased Glenhaughton Station on the Dawson River for D. C. McConnel before leaving to manage

Ramornie Station on the Clarence River for Charles Grant Tindal until 1885 and then Gordon Brook Station until 1888. He returned to Queensland permanently in 1888 to build a house for his wife and four children, first at Mount Stanley and finally at Caboonbah in 1889–1890.

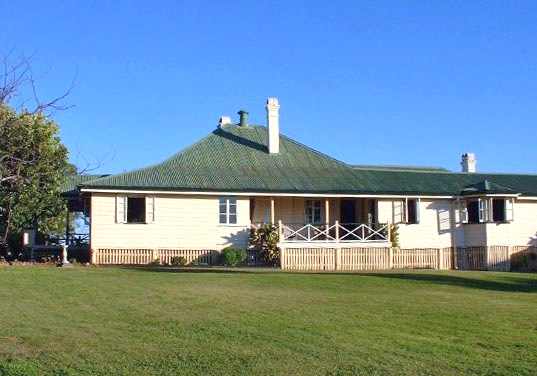
Caboonbah Homestead

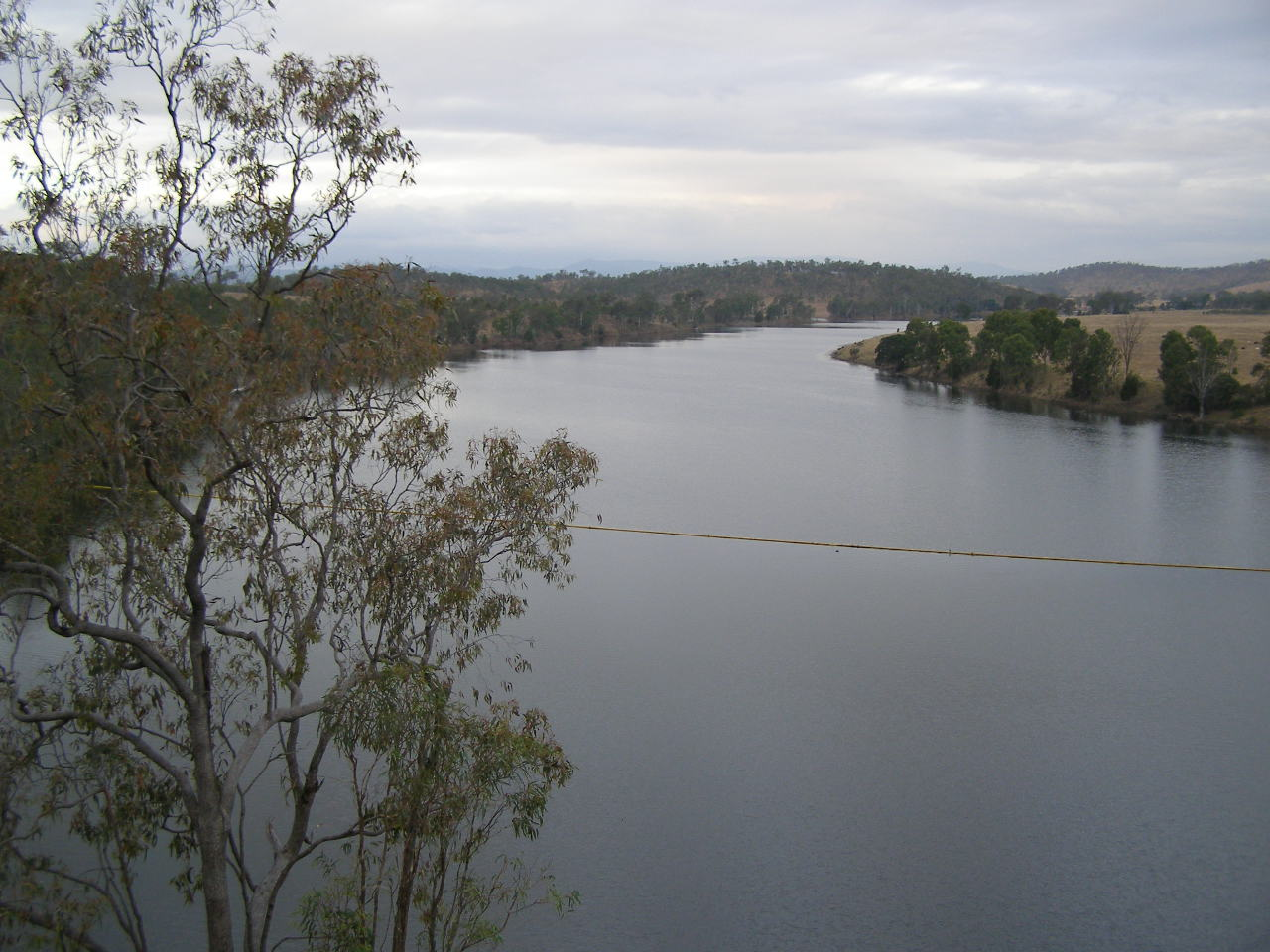
View of Brisbane River from the Caboonbah Homestead, looking south-east

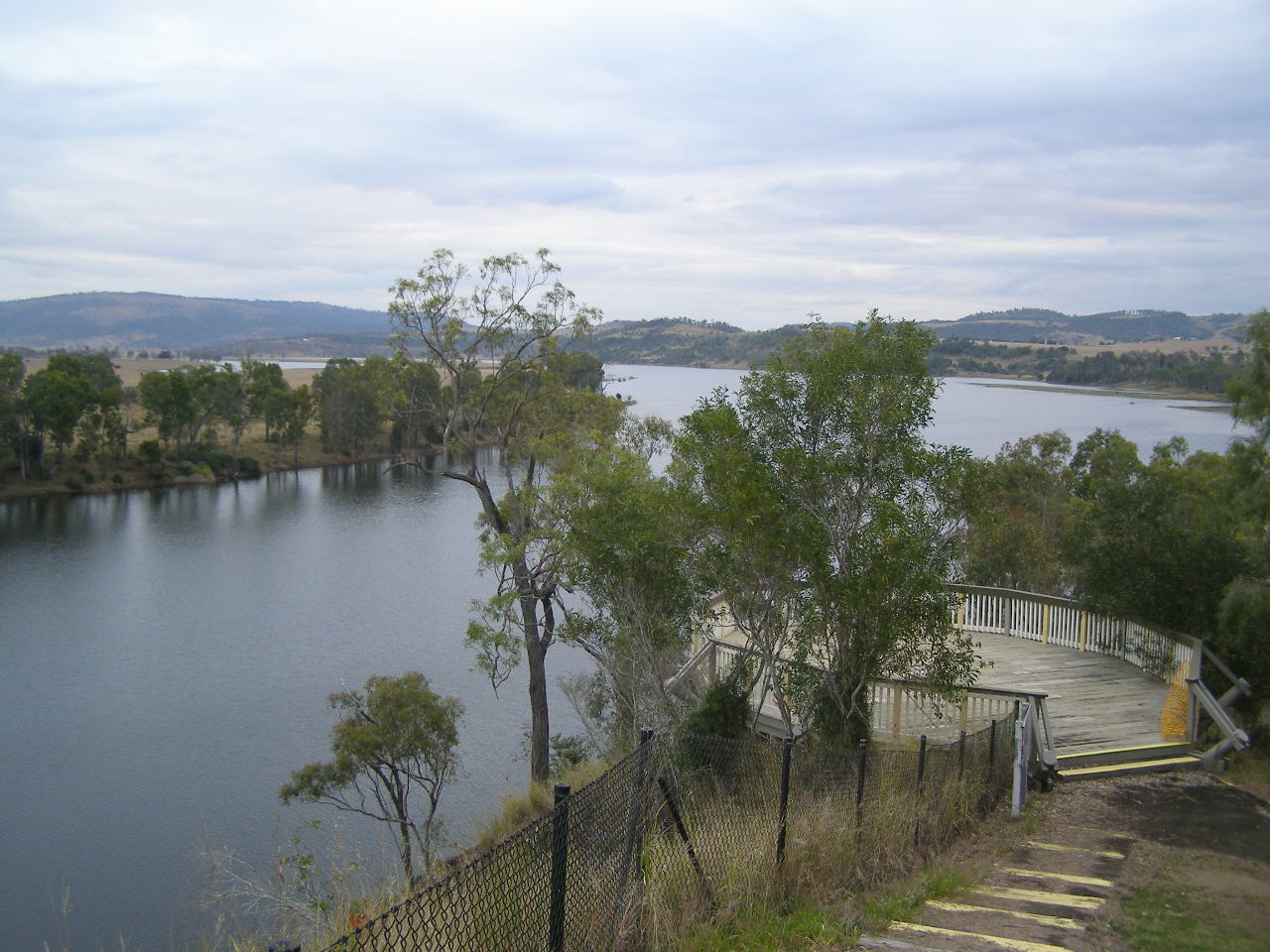
View of Brisbane River from the Caboonbah Homestead, looking south-west

His Caboonbah Homestead was built in a unique position commanding a view of both the Stanley and Brisbane Rivers and it was from here that Henry Somerset sent riders on two separate occasions to warn Brisbane of impending flooding in 1893. The first was a local bullock driver named Harry Winwood who rode to Esk with a telegram for Post Master General, Brisbane, but "not a soul was warned".

The second was a stockman from Dalgangal station, Billy Mateer, who rode to North Pine with more success. Convinced that Caboonbah's location was ideal for a flood warning station for the Brisbane and Stanley Rivers, Henry lobbied hard. and achieved his objective in 1895.

In 1893, he became the first chairman of the Mount Beppo State School, which opened on 4 September 1893.

== Politics ==
In 1890, he served as a councillor in the Esk Shire and served again from 1898–1905, being chairman from March 1901 to January 1902.

In September 1904 Henry Somerset won the seat of Stanley in the Queensland Legislative Assembly from the incumbent William Summerville (525 to 410) and retained it until 1920. In his first acceptance speech he described himself as a democrat, not a conservative and pledged himself to "use his influence to advance the construction of the railway line as far as Stanley Gates" (now known as the township of Moore on D’Aguilar Highway, Somerset). He also offered to come before the electors again if he failed. He had no need to honour that promise.

The railway had reached Yimbun, a station beyond Toogoolawah when Henry Plantagenet Somerset was first elected. It passed the timber town of Moore and reached Linville on 21 November 1910 and Benarkin on the Blackbutt Range by 8 May 1911. In two more years it was open to Blackbutt, Gilla, Pidna and finally Yarraman as its terminus which was formally opened on 1 May 1913. World War I intervened and stopped the proposed railway extension from Yarraman to Nanango which was never completed.

While in parliament, Somerset advocated better working conditions for country hospitals and staff, the teaching of practical skills like handcrafts and domestic science in State schools, assessment of water resources before surveying for closer settlement and particularly water conservation.

Henry Somerset successfully contested seven elections from 1904–1920 although his personal popularity was such that for some of these he was unopposed. Henry Somerset had joined the Farmers' Parliamentary Union by 1910 and continued to attend their meetings for several years. He initially accepted endorsement from the Queensland Farmers' Union (later the Country Party) for the 1915 Queensland state election and then rejected it to stand as a "straight out liberal". He won the next two elections but retired in 1920. The electorate of Stanley was held by the County Party until 1949 when an electoral redistribution saw the seat renamed Somerset.

== Stanley Dam ==
It was H. P. Somerset's nomination and advocacy of the Stanley Gorge as an effective catchment area for a dam that saw the Stanley Dam project being accepted for flood prevention, resulting in the creation of the now-called Somerset Dam. Its construction was one of two recommendations from a report by A. G. Gutteridge (1928) as Royal Commissioner exploring future water requirements for the City of Brisbane. It was initially rejected by Brisbane City Council that sparked unrelenting criticism for two years until the decision was reversed in 1930.

The dam project was supported by the Forgan Smith Government in 1933 but interrupted in 1942 when workmen and machinery were diverted to other purposes during World War II. The dam was finally opened in 1953.

== Death ==
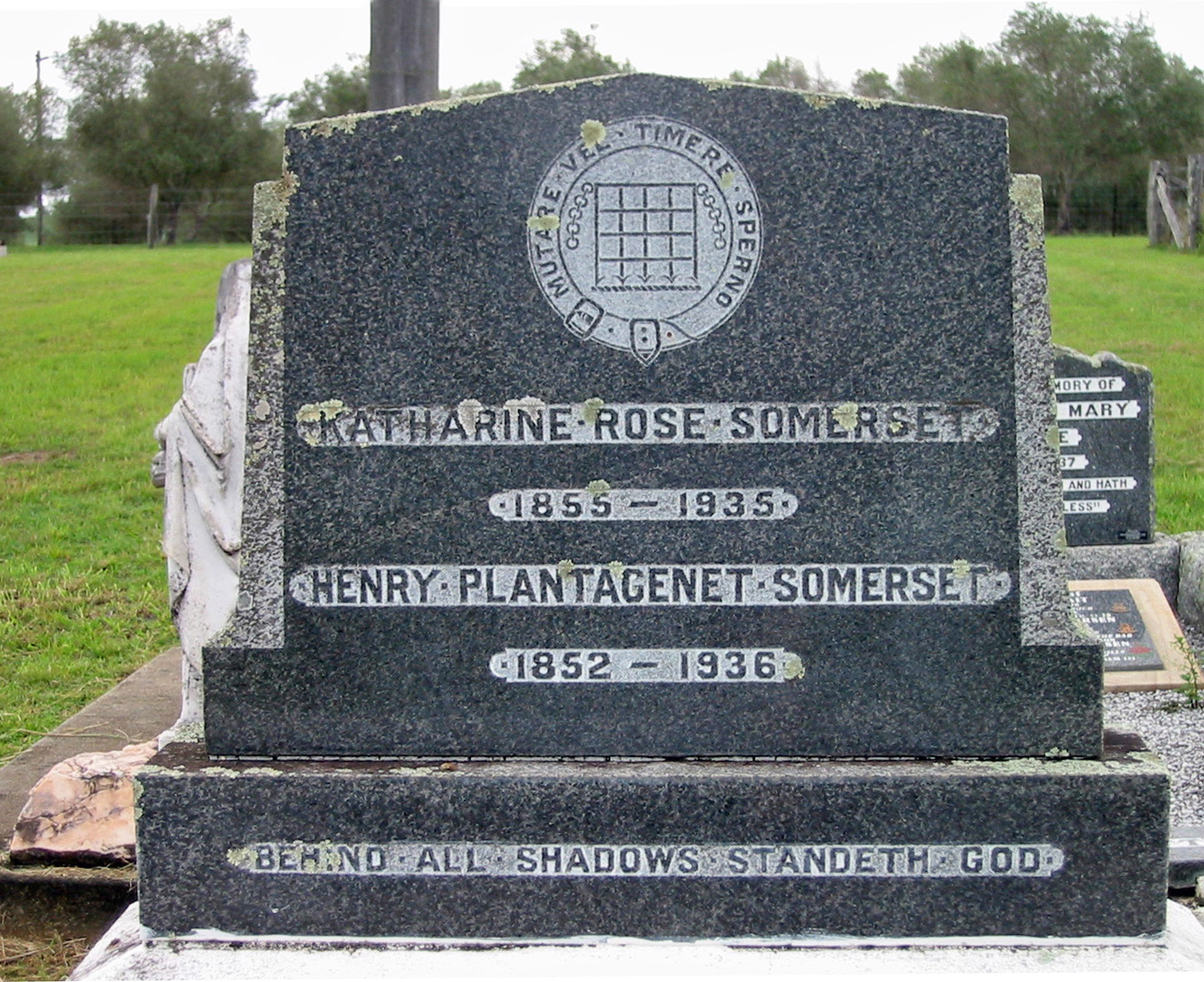
Henry Somerset's headstone in Caboonbah Undenomination Church cemetery

Henry Somerset died on 11 April 1936, all of his siblings, his wife and eldest son having predeceased him. He is buried in the cemetery of the Caboonbah Undenominational Church that he helped to establish and had served his community in local and State Government for thirty years. He chose as his own epitaph, "Write me as one who loves his fellow man".

== Legacy ==
The Caboonbah Homestead became the headquarters of the Brisbane Valley Historical Society. The society meticulously restored the homestead to its original condition, reopening it to the public in 1989. It was added to the Queensland Heritage Register (entry 601139) on 12 December 1996. Unfortunately, in May 2009, an electric fault started a fire which destroyed the homestead.

The Stanley Dam was renamed the Somerset Dam in 1958 in honour of Henry Plantagenet Somerset. The locality of Somerset Dam which surrounds the dam was also named after him and the local government area of Somerset Region.

The movie Deluge: the true story of the Great Brisbane Flood of 1893 starring local actor Ray Barrett presents the story of Somerset and his attempts to warn of the impending flood.

Parliament of Queensland
Preceded by William Summerville	Member for Stanley; 1904–1920	Succeeded by Frederick Nott
