= Mary McConnel (pioneer) =

Scottish-Australian settler

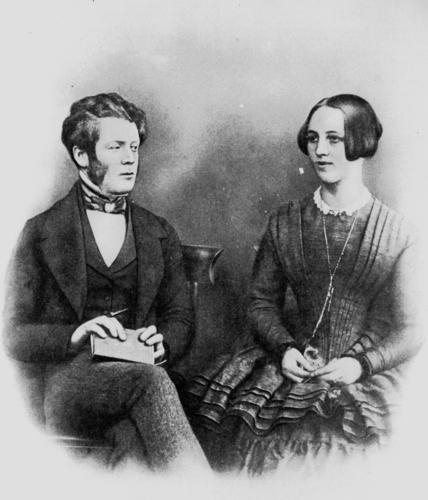
Mary McConnel (right) with her husband, David

Mary McConnel née McLeod/MacLeod (4 January 1824 – 4 January 1910) was a Scottish settler in the Australian colony of Queensland, who founded Brisbane's first children's hospital in 1878; it became the Royal Children's Hospital, Brisbane in 1883.

== Early life ==
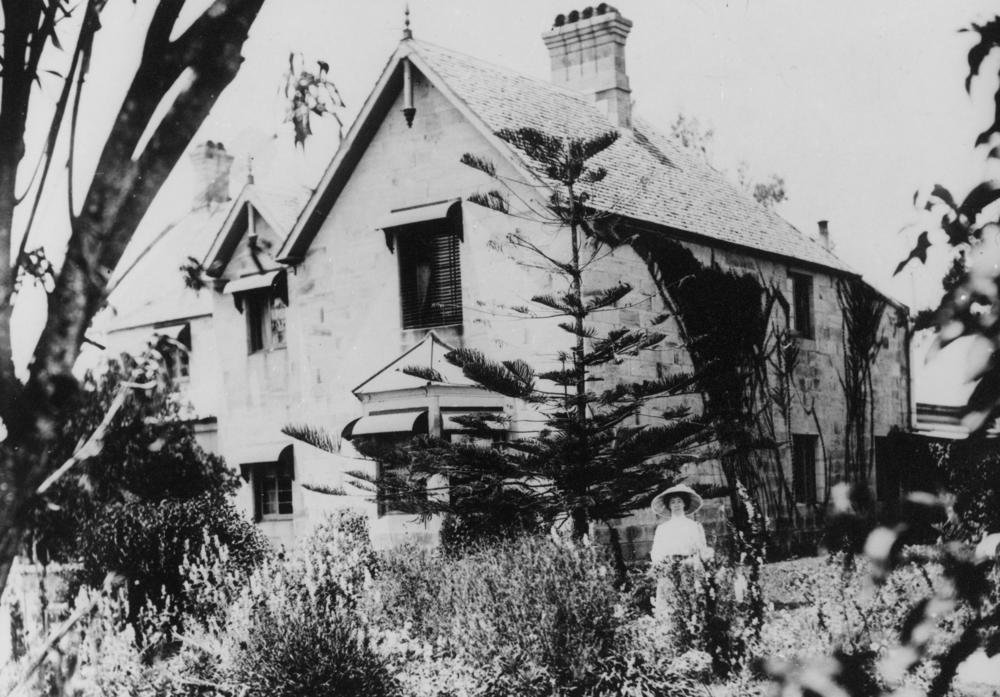
Bulimba House is still extant. Here pictured in about 1905

Mary McLeod/MacLeod was born on 4 January 1824 in Edinburgh, the daughter of excise officer Alexander McLeod/MacLeod and his wife Catherine/Katherine (née Rose), and baptised on 2 February 1824 at St Cuthbert's Church in Edinburgh. On 24 April 1848, she married David Cannon McConnel at St Cuthbert's Church in Edinburgh. David McConnel had previously emigrated to the colony of Queensland in 1840, where he had founded Cressbrook Homestead, named after his father's mill in Derbyshire.

== Pioneer life in Queensland ==
On 27 December 1848, the McConnels departed The Downs on board the sailing ship Chaseley arriving in Brisbane on 1 May 1849. Her husband built "Bulimba", the first stone house in Brisbane, and their first son was born there in 1850. Eight months later, she visited the family property at Cressbrook, where she lived when she and her husband were not on one of their many trips to Britain and Europe.

McConnel, a mother of six and grandmother, grew concerned at the lack of primary care for children in Brisbane, and inspired by the Royal Hospital for Sick Children in her home town of Edinburgh, and London's Great Ormond Street Hospital, she endeavoured over fifteen years to raise money to found a children's hospital in the Queensland capital. On the 11th March, 1878, the Hospital for Sick Children opened in rented premises in Leichhardt Street, Spring Hill, Brisbane, on the site of the present St Paul's Presbyterian Church. McConnel hired a nurse and matron from England to run the hospital, while local women were trained. The hospital quickly outgrew its 15-bed premises, and was moved to a larger building in Herston on land provided by the Queensland Government eventually becoming the Royal Children's Hospital.

The Mcconnels' daughter Katherine Rose married Henry Plantagenet Somerset, who were the founders of Caboonbah Homestead. Katherine Somerset designed the Caboonbah Undenominational Church.

== Later life ==
McConnel died on 4 January 1910 (her 86th birthday) in either London or Havant, Hampshire, England.

== Legacy ==
In 2003, the Mary McConnel School was founded in Forest Lake, Queensland.

The electoral district of McConnel (formerly Brisbane Central) created in the 2017 Queensland state electoral redistribution was named after her.

The present-day Queensland Children's Hospital traces its lineage back to the hospital she founded. One of its wards is called the McConnel Ward in her honour.

One of the McConnels' daughters was the folklorist of the same name, Mary MacLeod Banks (née McConnel).
