= Fort Armstrong, Eastern Cape =

Coordinates: 32°33′42″S 26°41′31″E

Fort Armstrong
- Kat River, South Africa

Site information
- Type: Block house
- Controlled by: South Africa
- Open to the public: Yes

Site history
- Built: 1836
- Battles/wars: Cape Frontier Wars

Fort Armstrong was constructed in 1836 to act as an important military outpost of the British during the Cape Frontier Wars. It has been under attack multiple times and served as a safe haven for the early pioneers of the Kat River area.

== History ==
Fort Armstrong was constructed in 1836 to protect the Kat River's valuable source of water. It was named after Captain Armstrong who fought in the area alongside the Cape Mounted Rifles during the 6th Frontier War.

Because of its relative isolation, the fort was designed to operate independently if need be. It had wattle and daub barracks that could accommodate up to 30 mounted men with ordnance stores, a powder magazine, officers quarters, kitchen stables and cells. A few meters away was a cattle kraal.

The fort's first test came when forces led by Maqoma and Kona took possession of it for about a month. On 22 February 1851, Major-General Henry Somerset, son of the Governor of the Cape, Charles Somerset, reclaimed it – killing 46 people and taking 560 prisoners including 400 women and children. Six male settlers were killed and 25 sustained injuries.

In 1853, during the 8th Frontier War, William Uithaalder, a Khoi who had served in the Cape Corps, led an attack on and took over control of the Fort. Colonial forces consisting of 200 British soldiers, 400 Burghers, 200 Fingoes, and volunteers from Grahamstown under Commandant Currie regrouped and launched two howitzer attacks against the fort, partially destroying what they built to protect themselves in order to oust Uithaalder.

== See also ==
- List of Castles and Fortifications in South Africa
