= Mary MacLeod Banks =

British folklorist and writer (1861–1951)

- Born: Mary MacLeod McConnel; 2 February 1861; Edinburgh
- Died: 22 December 1951 (aged 90); England
- Other names: M. M. Banks
- Occupations: Folklorist, writer

Mary MacLeod Banks (2 February 1861 – 22 December 1951) was a folklorist, born Mary MacLeod McConnel in Scotland. She was president of the Folklore Society from 1937 to 1939.

== Early life ==
Mary MacLeod McConnel was born in Edinburgh, the daughter of David Cannon McConnel, a colonist of Queensland, and Mary McConnel. She spent her formative years in Australia, at the family's sheep and cattle station in Cressbrook, and in Europe. As a young widow, she studied English literature at Oxford.

== Career ==
=== Research and service ===
Banks worked with social reformer Octavia Hill as a young woman, She became a long-serving member of the Folklore Society from 1906, later serving on its council and as president from 1937 to 1939. She gave presidential addresses titled "Syncretism in a Symbol" and "Scottish Lore of Earth, its Fruits, and the Plough". In 1947 she received the first Medal for Folk Lore Research from the Society, for her work on Scottish calendar customs. She was also a fellow of the Royal Historical Society from 1906, and a member of the Philological Society.

Though based in London, Banks travelled extensively throughout Europe gathering material and researching the many papers she wrote for the society's journal. She maintained contact with the Pitt Rivers Museum and especially its curator Henry Balfour, who became her close friend. During the Second World War donated artifacts she had collected during her fieldwork to the Pitt Rivers Museum, including a chamberpot and brass horse ornaments.

=== Publications ===
Her published research included British Calendar Customs: Scotland (1937, 1941) and British Calendar Customs: Orkney and Shetland (1946). She edited Arnoldus Leodiensis's An Alphabet of Tales: An English Fifteenth Century Translation of the Alphabetum Narrationum of Etienne de Besançon (1904). A personal project was her memoir, Memories of Pioneer Days in Queensland (1931), in which she acknowledged racial violence in her rural Australian childhood:

It was not until years after my childhood that I learnt of cruelties to the blacks, and I refused at first to believe it possible. This I know, that there were very many places where the natives were treated with kindness, and that much of the harshness was due to ignorance and misunderstanding. But for actual cruelty, which unfortunately cannot be denied, no excuse is possible.

== Personal life ==
Mary MacLeod McConnel married Alfred Banks, an English architect. She was widowed when Banks died on a journey to the United Kingdom. She died in 1951, aged 90 years, in London. Her niece Dorothea McConnel married Australian psychologist Elton Mayo; another niece was Australian anthropologist Ursula McConnel.
