= Caboonbah Homestead =

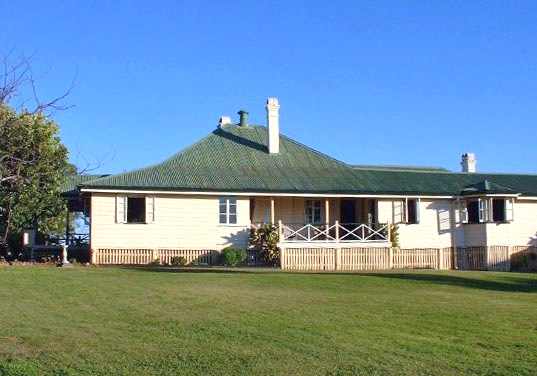
- Caboonbah homestead, 2009

- Location within Queensland Location within Australia
- 27.1437°S 152.4919°E
- Location: Esk-Kilcoy Road, Lake Wivenhoe, Somerset Region, Queensland, Australia

History
- Design period: 1870s - 1890s (late 19th century)
- Built: 1889 - 1890
- Demolished: 10 May 2009

Site notes
- Architectural style: Arts & Crafts

Queensland Heritage Register
- Official name: Caboonbah Homestead
- Type: state heritage (built)
- Designated: 12 December 1996
- Delisted: 2014
- Reference no.: 601139
- Significant period: 1880s-1930s (historical); 1880s-1890s (fabric)
- Significant components: furniture/fittings, views to, residential accommodation - main house, views from

Caboonbah Homestead was a heritage-listed homestead at Esk-Kilcoy Road, Lake Wivenhoe, Somerset Region, Queensland, Australia. It was built from 1889 to 1890. It was added to the Queensland Heritage Register on 12 December 1996. It was destroyed by fire in 2009 and removed from the Queensland Heritage Register in 2014.

== History ==
Caboonbah Homestead was built in 1889–90 for grazier Henry Plantagenet Somerset and his wife Katherine Rose (née McConnel) and their family.

Henry Plantagenet Somerset, connected to an important English military family, arrived in Moreton Bay in 1871 at the age of 19 years, intending to stay only until he could obtain an English army commission. Instead, he took up stock work and station management in Queensland and New South Wales. In 1879 he married Katherine Rose, daughter of pioneer Brisbane Valley squatter David Cannon McConnel and Mary McLeod McConnel of Cressbrook Station. Somerset had worked for the McConnels, learning station skills at Cressbrook during 1872, and then managing Mount Marlow station for them.

During the 1880s Somerset managed a New South Wales pastoral station and meatworks before returning to Queensland to purchase a property of his own. In 1888 he secured approximately 20,000 acres (8,100 ha) in the Mount Stanley area of the Brisbane Valley as a grazing farm, intending to erect his family home there. He engaged a brickmaker to start making bricks for the chimneys, and employed men to pit-saw pine logs brought down from the ranges. However, respecting the McConnels' wish that the two families should avoid the 19 river crossings between Cressbrook and Mount Stanley, Somerset agreed to exchange 10,000 acres (4,000 ha) of his Mount Stanley land for 5,000 acres (2,000 ha) of freehold Cressbrook land at the junction of the Brisbane and Stanley Rivers. Somerset called this property Caboonbah, derived from the Aboriginal Cabon gibba meaning big rock, describing the steep, 120-foot (37 m) high bank of the Brisbane River on which Caboonbah homestead was built. The property, mostly comprising rich alluvial flats, was divided into 7 paddocks and was devoted to fattening bullocks, dairying and horse-breeding. Some sheep were also run, but eventually these were replaced by goats. In 1892 the first cattle to cross the d'Aguilar Range were a mob of fat bullocks from Caboonbah.

Work on Caboonbah Homestead commenced in late 1889 and was completed during the summer floods of 1890. The brickmaker employed at Mount Stanley made 30,000 bricks at the head of Sapphire Gully, to the west of the house, and erected a service building containing a bakery, washhouse and storerooms. The oven fire also was used to heat water, which was then piped to the adjoining washhouse. The locally produced bricks proved to be very brittle, so bricks from Dinmore (near Ipswich) were ordered for the house chimneys. The house was constructed mostly of milled timber brought in from Nicholson's mill near Villeneuve, but some of the pine sawn at Mount Stanley was used in construction of the loft. The roof was clad in shingles, stacked wet and not dressed. This created a cooler roof, but in time the shingles warped and shrank.

The Somerset family occupied their new home in March 1890, and remained there until Katherine's death in 1935. HP Somerset died the following year. Two of their ten children were born at Caboonbah, and two lie buried on the slope below the front of the house (27.1438°S 152.4933°E).

During the 1893 Brisbane River floods Henry Somerset was in a unique position at Caboonbah to observe the rapidly rising flood waters and to realise the potential danger to surrounding districts. When 36 inches (910 mm) of rain fell in the Blackall Ranges in February 1893 and raised the river level to 74 feet 3 inches (22.63 m) at Caboonbah Homestead, Somerset dispatched a messenger on horseback to Esk to telegraph Brisbane of the impending danger. Two weeks later the Brisbane River rose again, and finding the Esk telegraph line down, Somerset rowed across the flooded Brisbane River, two horses swimming in tow, to send a rider across the d'Aguilar Range to Caboolture to telegraph Brisbane. The first message was ignored or misinterpreted, but as a result of Somerset's efforts Caboonbah was made Queensland's first flood warning station, with a telegraph line to Cressbrook Station carrying a family-operated Morse for 8? years until a telephone line was installed in the early 1900s. The flood warning station was staffed by the Somersets for 40 years, 1893–1933, without remuneration.

Henry Somerset sustained heavy financial losses, estimated at £11,000, during the 1893 floods and was obliged to sell his Mount Stanley holdings to secure the family homestead at Caboonbah against debt.

Both Henry and Katherine Somerset were prominent in Brisbane Valley community work. From 1890 to 1904 Henry was a member of the Esk Divisional Board, later the Esk Shire Council, and finally its chairman. With Mrs Lumley-Hill of Bellevue Station, Katherine was co-founder of the Stanley Memorial Hospital (now the Esk and District Hospital). In 1905 the Somersets founded the Caboonbah Undenominational Church, donating the land and standing timber, the latter exchanged for seasoned timber from Lars Andersen's sawmill at Esk. Prior to construction of the church Henry had held services every second Sunday either at Caboonbah or in barns on neighbouring properties and Katherine played the organ at these services.

From 1904 to 1920 Henry Somerset served as the Member of the Legislative Assembly for Stanley, being returned 6 times by his electorate. Due to his representations the Brisbane Valley railway was extended to Blackbutt in 1911 and finally to Yarraman in 1913. He was also a prominent supporter of the rural schools movement. His early contributions to the welfare of the district were honoured when Stanley became part of the larger electorate of Somerset.

Henry Somerset was also the first to suggest the site of the present Somerset Dam, named in his honour. Following the 1893 floods and their devastating effects on the Brisbane River valley, various flood mitigation schemes were proposed to modify the run-off of the Brisbane and Stanley Rivers, but none were adopted. The 1901–1902 drought highlighted the need for water storage above Mount Crosby Pumping Station to meet Brisbane's growing water consumption. In 1906, when the Brisbane Water Board was proposing to utilise the lake on Stradbroke Island to augment Brisbane's water supply, Somerset invited the Board to send an engineer to inspect the Stanley Gorge, suggesting that a dam across the gorge would serve two purposes: flood mitigation in the Brisbane River Valley, and increased storage for Brisbane's water supply. Eminent American engineer Allan Hazen also inspected the site and agreed that it had potential for future development, but recommended that a dam on Cabbage Tree Creek would solve Brisbane's more immediate needs. Lake Manchester, on Cabbage Tree Creek, was completed in 1916, putting the Stanley River proposal on hold.

The 1928 Gutteridge commission of enquiry into Brisbane's Water Supply recommended that reservoirs be constructed on the Brisbane River at Middle Creek and on the Stanley River at Little Mount Brisbane, but no action was taken until 1933, when the Forgan-Smith Labor Government adopted the Brisbane River Valley flood mitigation and water supply scheme (Stanley Dam) as a major employment-generating project during an era of severe economic depression. By 1935 work on the dam itself had commenced, and in that year district residents requested that the name of the dam be changed to Somerset, honouring the man who first proposed the site. The town established for the dam workers was also named Somerset. The dam structure was largely in place by 1941, but in 1943 the workforce was diverted to the war effort. The dam was opened in 1953, and in late 1958 Queensland Premier Frank Nicklin unveiled a memorial plaque officially naming the dam after Henry Plantagenet Somerset.

Following Katherine Somerset's death in 1935, the Somerset home and a small portion of the original property of 5,000 acres (2,000 ha) was sold to the Grieve family, who operated Caboonbah as a guest house until 1962. In 1963 the house was purchased as a private residence by Neville Carseldine. Caboonbah was resumed in 1973 by the Queensland Government as part of the Wivenhoe Dam project, and was leased for 10 years by Mr Carseldine's brother Max until 1983, when the Brisbane Valley Historical Society obtained an occupation permit. The property was transferred later to the Brisbane and Area Water Board, which removed all but one of the original timber outbuildings associated with the homestead. Caboonbah Homestead remained the headquarters of the Brisbane Valley Historical Society. Following meticulous restoration, the Caboonbah Homestead was opened to the public in 1989. The society also relocated to the grounds two early 20th century cottages, the 1928 Esk Court House, and a c. 1906 cell block from Esk (but do not form part of the heritage listing).

In 2000, the movie Deluge: the true story of the Great Brisbane Flood of 1893 starring local actor Ray Barrett presented the story of Somerset and his attempts to warn of the impending flood.

The Caboonbah Homestead burned down on 10 May 2009.

== Description ==
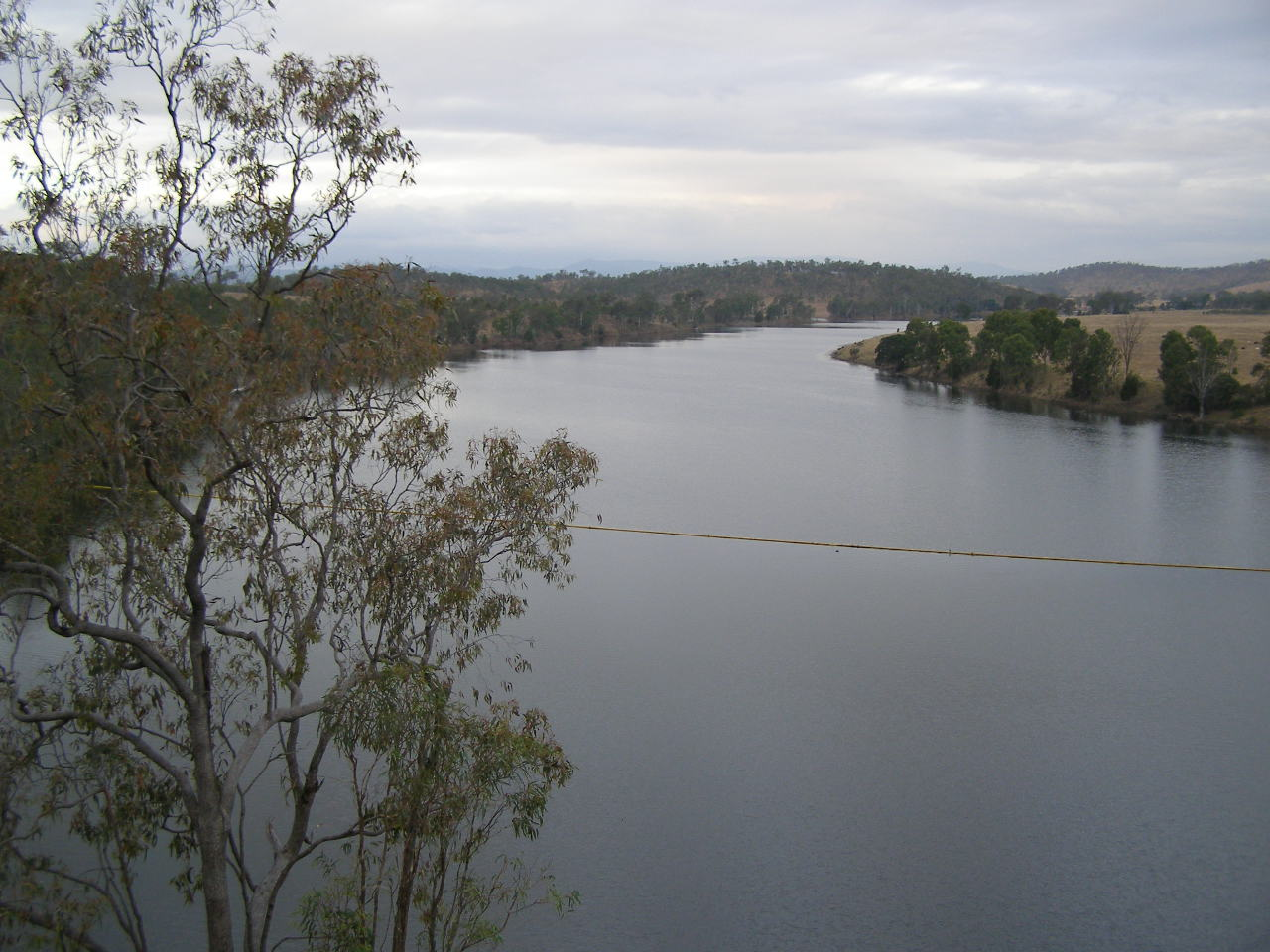
View of Brisbane River from the Caboonbah Homestead, looking south-east, 2010

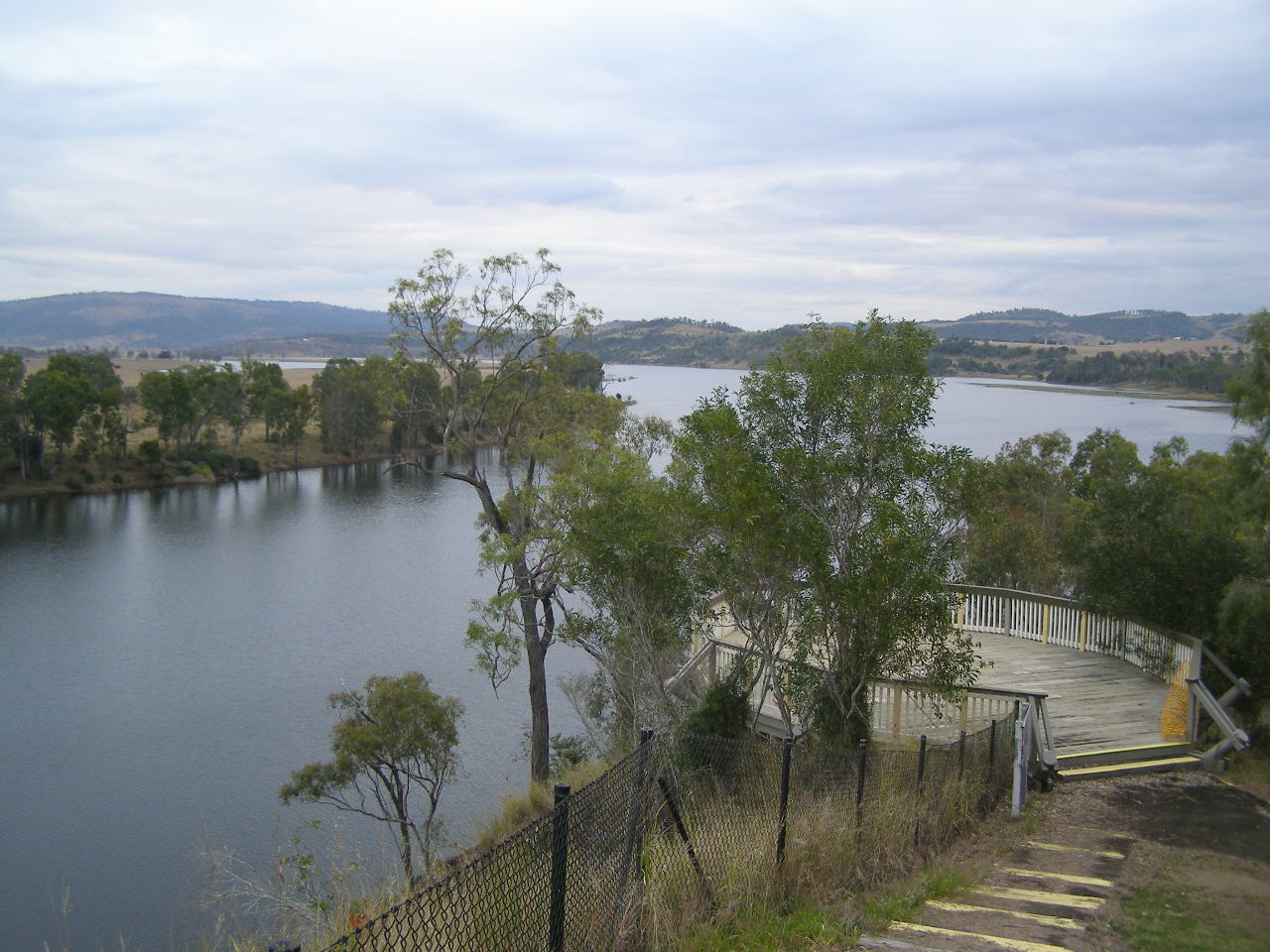
View of Brisbane River from the Caboonbah Homestead, looking south-west, 2010

Caboonbah Homestead was a large, single-storeyed timber residence situated on the elevated south bank of the Brisbane River, three miles below its junction with the Stanley River. The house overlooked Lake Wivenhoe. The building was low set on timber stumps and has a hardwood frame clad in profiled timber boarding. There were timber verandahs to the north, east and south elevations. The roof was of galvanised iron, fixed over original the timber shingles, on a pitched hardwood frame.

The homestead had been extended a number of times. The large entrance porch on the eastern elevation was an addition with a low pitched projecting gable. The battened gable end and detailing of the verandah posts and railings indicated that this was probably added in the 1920s.

The original plan was a central corridor with four main rooms, an attached service wing and verandahs to the north, east and south. The verandahs were partially enclosed and contained a series of small rooms. To the north west at the rear of the homestead a wing was added parallel to the original service wing. The detailing of this wing including the bay window indicates that this wing was added in the 1920s. Internally the homestead retained many of the original fittings, including cedar surrounds to the fireplaces and a coved timber ceiling in the dining room.

A masonry service building was adjacent to the homestead on the western side. The floor was concrete, the walls were of hand-made brick with some minor timber frame divisions, and it had a corrugated galvanised iron roof. There was a verandah to the north wall which returns part way round the east wall. On the southern elevation was an open covered recess.

== Heritage listing ==
Caboonbah Homestead was listed on the Queensland Heritage Register on 12 December 1996 having satisfied the following criteria.

The place is important in demonstrating the evolution or pattern of Queensland's history.

Caboonbah Homestead, erected 1889–90, is important in demonstrating the pattern of Queensland's history, being associated with the establishment of the first flood warning station in Queensland in 1893. The place is also closely associated with local social and political events, in particular representing the legislative power of the Queensland Government in the Stanley electorate from 1904 to 1920.

The place is important in demonstrating the principal characteristics of a particular class of cultural places.

Caboonbah Homestead makes a significant contribution to the Queensland estate, illustrating the principal characteristics of a substantial, late 19th century timber homestead with early 20th century additions. The design, with its wide, low verandahs onto which every room opens, high ceilings, opening fanlights above French doors, roof ventilator and low timber stumps, illustrates the adaptation of traditional British architectural taste to Queensland climatic conditions. A lack of refurbishment in a more pretentious style to accompany the increasing status of its owners reflects the aesthetic and cultural values of our nation builders.

The place has a strong or special association with a particular community or cultural group for social, cultural or spiritual reasons.

Caboonbah Homestead has a special association for the local community with the early development of the Caboonbah area, with state politics in the Stanley (now part of Somerset) electorate for 16 years, and with the construction of the Somerset dam, one of Queensland's most important mid-20th century projects.

The place has a special association with the life or work of a particular person, group or organisation of importance in Queensland's history.

Caboonbah Homestead has a special association with the life and work of Henry Plantagenet Somerset and his wife Katherine Rose McConnel, who lived at Caboonbah from 1890 until Katherine's death in 1935. The Somersets were prominent in Brisbane Valley and later Queensland affairs from 1890 to 1920. In particular, Henry Somerset is associated with the establishment of Caboonbah as the first flood warning station in Queensland, and with the selection of the site for the Somerset Dam, named in his honour.

== Delisting ==
In 2011, the Heritage Act was amended to allow destroyed sites to be removed from the Queensland Heritage Register. As at 2017, five sites had been removed, all of which had been destroyed before 2012, including the Caboonbah Homestead.
