= Caboonbah Undenominational Church =

Union church in Queensland, Australia

Coordinates: 27.13412°S 152.46732°E

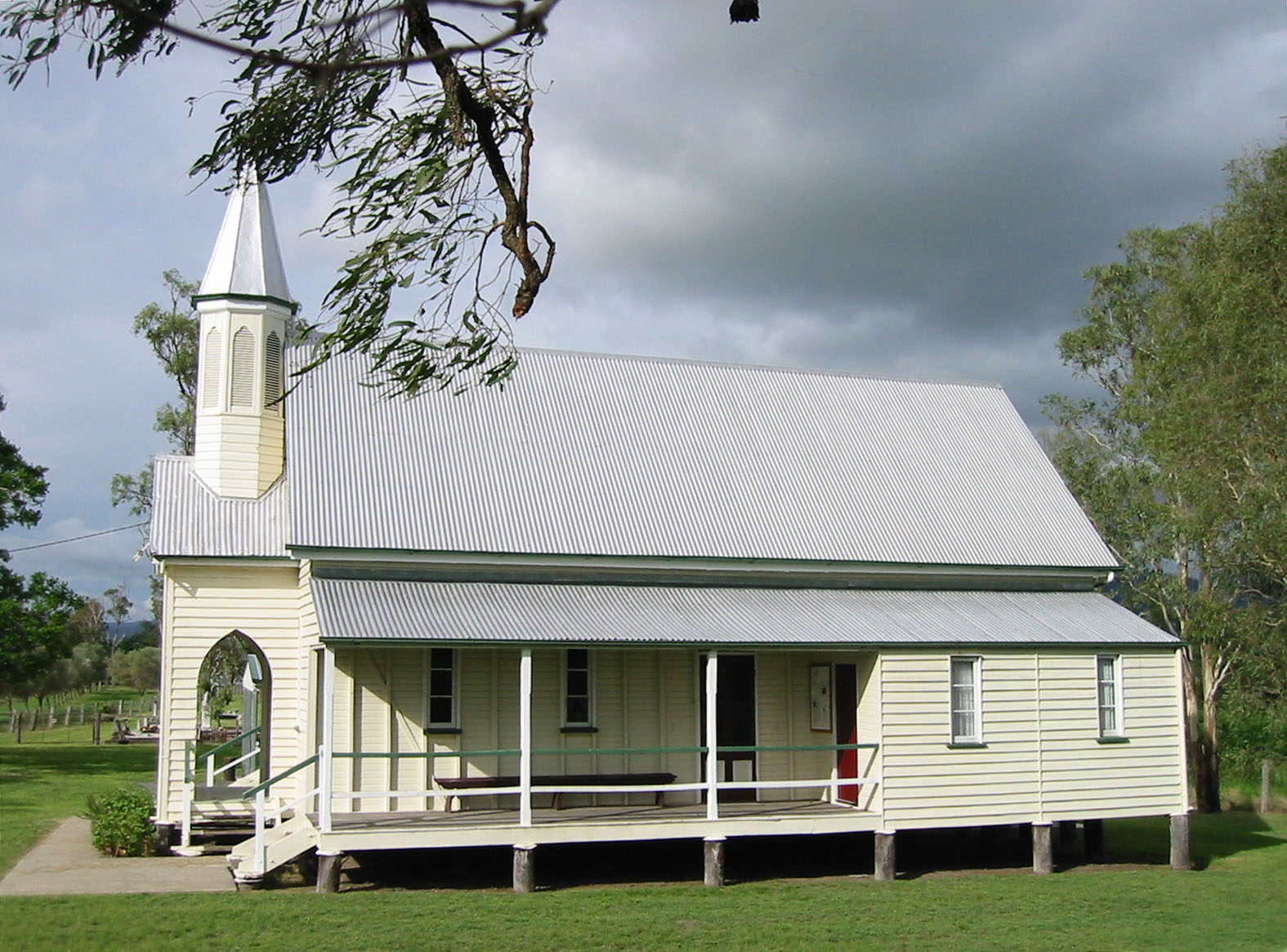
Caboonbah Undenominational Church, 2010

Caboonbah Undenominational Church is a union church on the Cressbrook-Caboonbah Road, Mount Beppo, approximately 21 kilometres (13 mi) from Toogoolawah in the Somerset Region of South East Queensland, Australia. It was founded by Henry Plantagenet Somerset, and built by Lars Andersen in 1905 to serve a farming community at Mount Beppo. The wooden structure was designed by Mrs Katherine Rose Somerset and takes its name, "Caboonbah", from the Somerset family homestead, Caboonbah Homestead, nearby.

== History ==
Caboonbah Church was developed as an undenominational or 'Union' church when all denominations in small communities used one building for worship according to their own faith until each denomination could afford a building of its own. Resident Anglican, Presbyterian, and Methodist ministers residing at Esk by 1905 visited Caboonbah Church regularly. Now Caboonbah Undenominational Church is one of the very few remaining churches in Queensland that still welcomes services for congregations of any faith.

The original trustees of this church were John Thomas Milner, David Walker Smith, Charles Henry Soden, Edward William Soden and Robert Dawson Soden “all of Mt. Beppo & Caboonbah”.

The Church celebrated its Golden Jubilee with a crowd of 250 sharing luncheon under tarpaulins and its honoured guests on that occasion were Dr. Don Cameron, M.H.R., Mr. Alec Skinner, M.L.A. and Cr. William Wells (Chairman, Esk Shire Council). The Queensland Times’ report includes a photo of the church.

The last regular church service was held at Caboonbah Church in 1978. By that time congregations had become very small and there was a real threat that the church would close. Instead it was decided to entrust a local committee with the maintenance of the church precinct and to hold an annual ecumenical service on the second Saturday in November. This continues today. Hard times continued to threaten Caboonbah Church until it received a welcome bequest from the late Frank Hopkins in 1984 that ensured its continued survival.

On 5 November 2005, the Caboonbah Church celebrated its centenary with an ecumenical service at which Anglican Archbishop of Brisbane Phillip Aspinall gave the occasional address.

There were two burials in the Caboonbah Church cemetery before the church was built: Richard Soden, 2-year-old son of E.W. Soden was buried in August 1904 and his grandfather Richard Dawson Soden (snr.) in January 1905. Headstones from Caboonbah Homestead cemetery were relocated there after they were threatened by rising water from the construction of the Wivenhoe Dam. The cemetery beside Caboonbah Church is now maintained by the Somerset Regional Council and contains the grave of H.P. Somerset (Member for Stanley, 1904–1920) after whom the region is named.

== Description ==
Originally it had a shingled roof, an unusual church spire and verandahs on its eastern and western sides. One small room is set aside for mothers with small children and another as a robing room for visiting clergy.

Ten years later there is a more comprehensive report of the Diamond Jubilee celebrations with another photo of the shingled roof that was replaced with iron immediately afterwards. This report includes a history of the Church and lists 67 ministers of the Anglican, Methodist and Presbyterian faiths who had preached at the Church. It finishes with the sentence: “The Caboonbah church is set on a hill and looking towards the mountains from all directions the scene is one of tranquillity and unsurpassed beauty, especially when the sun changes the mountain colours to various shades of blue, green and gold.” Since that time its beauty has been enhanced by the establishment of an olive grove beside its boundary fence so that the first sight of Caboonbah Church by road from Toogoolawah is its tall, white spire rising above the perpetual green of the olive trees.

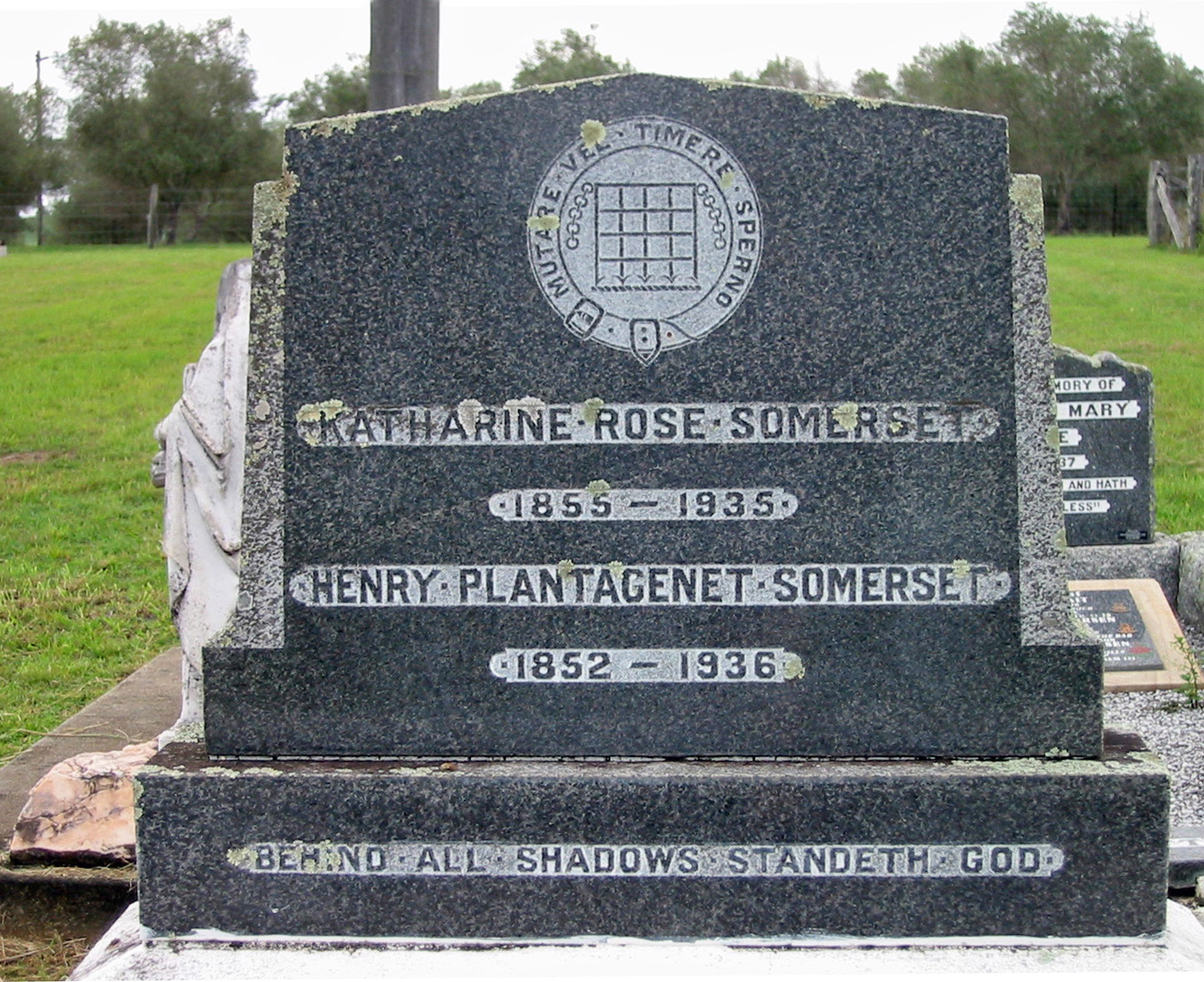
Henry Somerset's headstone in Caboonbah Church cemetery
