= Cressbrook Homestead =

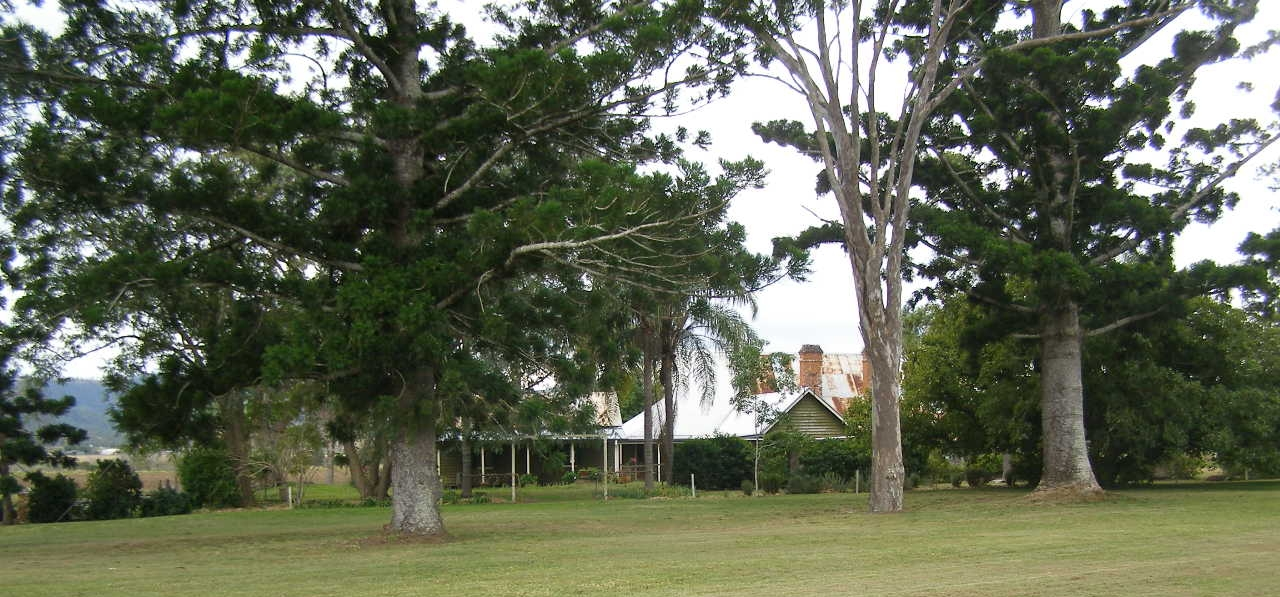
- Cressbrook Homestead with the bunya pines, 2010

- Location within Queensland Location within Australia
- 27.0578°S 152.4047°E
- Location: off Cressbrook-Caboombah Road, Cressbrook, Somerset Region, Queensland, Australia

History
- Design period: 1840s–1860s (mid-19th century)
- Built: 1841–1914

Queensland Heritage Register
- Official name: Cressbrook Homestead
- Type: state heritage (landscape, built)
- Designated: 21 October 1992
- Reference no.: 600503
- Significant period: 1840s (historical); 1840s-1910s (fabric)
- Significant components: residential accommodation – manager's house/quarters, residential accommodation – staff housing, stained glass window/s, kitchen/kitchen house, dairy/creamery, driveway, decorative finishes, tennis court, garden/grounds, yards – livestock, bell, tank stand, chimney/chimney stack, out building/s, tree, furniture/fittings, residential accommodation – main house, chapel, dip, shed/s, graveyard, stables, magazine / explosives store, storage tank

Cressbrook Homestead is a heritage-listed homestead at off Cressbrook-Caboombah Road, Cressbrook, Somerset Region, Queensland, Australia. It was built from 1841 to 1914. It was added to the Queensland Heritage Register on 21 October 1992.

== History ==
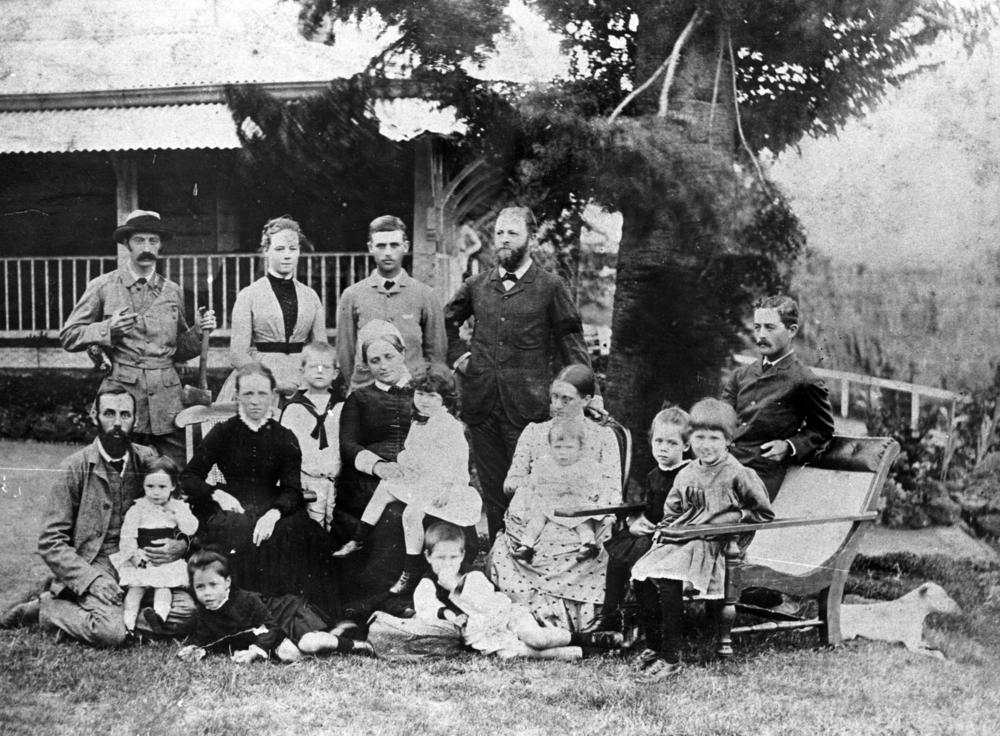
McConnel family at Cressbrook Station, ca. 1887

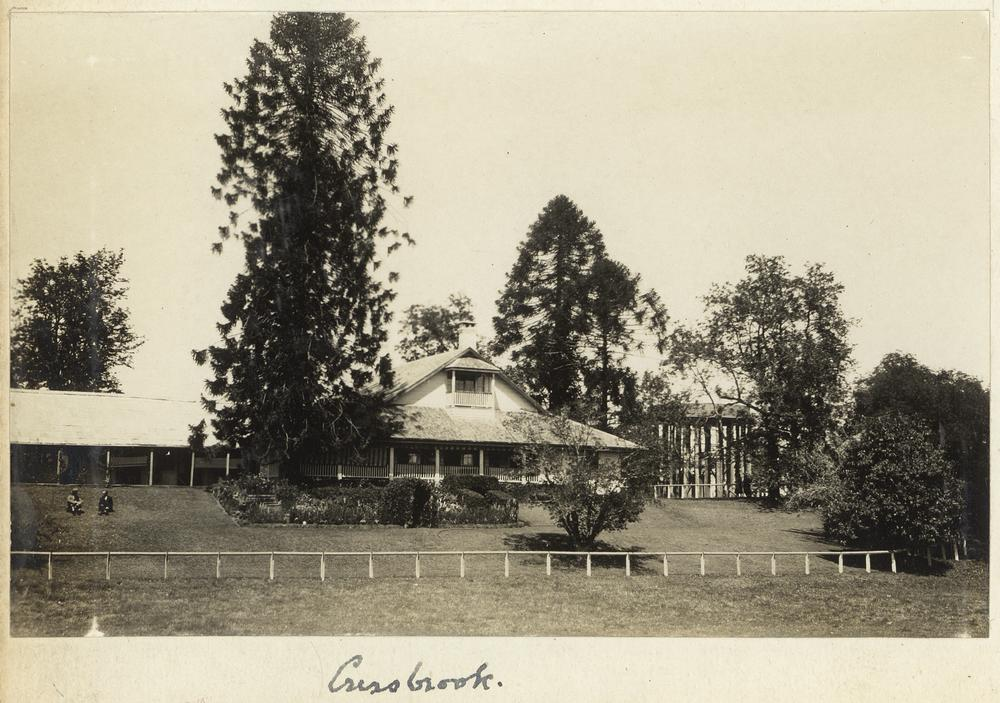
Homestead at Cressbrook Station, 1930

Cressbrook Homestead was constructed as the head station of the Cressbrook Run which was taken up by the McConnel family in 1841.

David Cannon McConnel arrived in Sydney from Britain in February 1840 where he purchased sheep and started searching for a suitable pastoral lease. His search took him northward to the Moreton Bay region recently opened for selection after the closure of the penal colony. After this event, many eager British immigrants, including the Leslie Brothers, Wickham, the Bigge Brothers and John Balfour were selecting land in the Moreton Bay area. McConnel pressed northward past the rich Darling Downs into the Brisbane River Valley which became the next centre of pastoral development after land on the Darling Downs was fully selected. The Brisbane River Valley was explored by both Cunningham and Patrick Logan in the late 1820s and many squatters took up land in the early 1840s.

On 15 July 1841 David McConnel took up 240 square miles of land in the Valley, with the Brisbane River and a creek running through. David McConnel was the son of James McConnel who founded a machine making company in Manchester after which, in 1835, he became the owner of the long established and Cressbrook Mill in Derbyshire where lace thread was produced. It was here that the McConnels established their family home and it was to commemorate this place that David McConnel named his Australian property and the creek running through the property. Within one year, Francis and Frederic Bigge established the adjoining Mount Brisbane Station and six months after this John Balfour took up land on the other side of Cressbrook for his station, Colinton.

McConnel established Cressbrook as a sheep farm but found the land more suitable for Shorthorn cattle which were introduced by 1845. He constructed a timber slab house in 1841 but because the location was deemed unsuitable another two-roomed slab house was constructed with verandah overlooking the Brisbane River to the north. Two bunya pine trees were planted by McConnel at the west end of this verandah. The slab hut and one of the bunya pines survives to this day; the hut now forming the eastern wing of the principal house.

David McConnel returned to Britain in 1847 where he married Mary McLeod of Edinburgh on 25 April 1847. Mary's parents were against the pair returning to Australia and therefore the newly weds settled in Nottinghamshire, though financial difficulties at Cressbrook, which had been left in the hands of managers, necessitated their return in 1849. They returned aboard Chaseley, one of the three boats chartered by the Rev. Dr. John Dunmore Lang for the transport of Presbyterians to the new colony of Queensland. Having arrived, David and Mary McConnel settled in Brisbane, establishing the house, Toogoolawah (now known as Bulimba House).

On 1 January 1851 David McConnel's brother, John McConnel, joined in partnership with his brother and they purchased Durundur Station, previously belonging to the Archers, who moved to the Burnett region. In 1851 the McConnels owned 400 cattle and 10,000 sheep on both of the Brisbane River Valley properties.

David McConnel returned to England with his seriously ill wife in 1854 and they did not return to Cressbrook until 1862, when the partnership between David and John McConnel was dissolved with John McConnel taking exclusive rights at Durundur and David maintaining the ownership of Cressbrook. Upon David and Mary's return to Cressbrook extensive alterations were made to the slab hut, which was from an early date known as the House, to distinguish it from the Cottage which was built nearby. This addition to the House comprised the construction of a timber section, two storeyed in part and generally larger in scale than the wing to which it was abutted. A kitchen wing, another timber slab building, was added to the south of the House.

As well another residence was constructed at Cressbrook, the previously mentioned Cottage which was built further west of the House and overlooking the Brisbane River and adjacent flood plain. The Cottage was unusual as it was a timber framed building with brick nogging. Although few records exist to suggest who built this or when, the peculiarly German method of construction suggests that there may have been a German influence, and it is known that David McConnel could speak German. The building was thought to have been constructed in the 1860s and was used as a residence for various farm managers and, later, the families of McConnel children.

This construction work brought many people to the station, "splitters, sawyers, carpenters, builders, bricklayers". Along with the farmhands and managers, these additional people created a small township at Cressbrook and attempts were made by the McConnels to establish a school for the children, one of the first in the Brisbane River Valley, and a library for the men in one of the rooms of the Cottage. Weekly Presbyterian church services were held in the recently constructed addition to the House.

Mary McConnel and her daughter, also Mary, wrote memoirs about Cressbrook, describing the buildings, gardens and generally the life on the station. Younger Mary's recollection of the Cottage includes, "Through the hand-gate in front of the entrance porch (of the House) was a small paddock which divided the House from the Cottage; it had swings and a few silky oaks. The Cottage was of brick with a steep shingled roof; two or three gentlemen...were lodged under the efficient charge of a Scottish working-housekeeper". She continues on to describe living on the verandah of the House,

Indoor occupation was varied and constant. One says indoor – yet it was carried out for the most part on the wide verandah, shaded from the sun by blinds. These came from Java or Japan; they were made of long strips of cane painted green and rolled up in the evening by cords on small pulleys. On the verandah peaches were stoned for jam, oranges peeled for marmalade and quinces carefully paired and cored for jelly. There was a wide table where the many kerosene lamps were washed and trimmed every morning and set ready to be carried to their respective rooms at night. There was the indispensable treadle sewing machine, and in a cool corner, in a draught, stood a filter with a tap and a tin pannikin, near it a large porous water-jar swathed in damp flannel for evaporation.

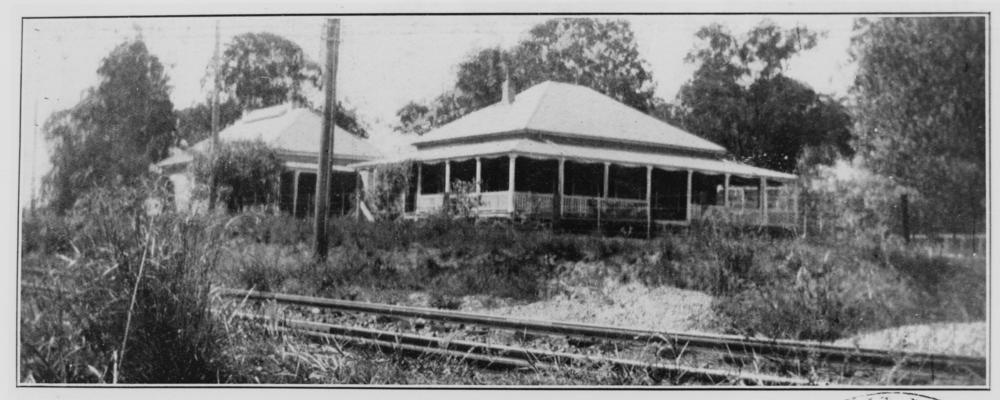
Witton House, in the grounds of Tighnabruaich, a residence in Indooroopilly, circa 1932

In 1873 David Cannon McConnel retired from managing Cressbrook and one of his sons, James Henry (Henry) assumed responsibility. David and Mary moved to Witton Manor at Indooroopilly on the Brisbane River, which was later moved to the Tighnabruaich house site, and is now demolished. From her new situation in Brisbane, Mary McConnel was influential in establishing one of the first children's hospitals in Australia, the Hospital for Sick Children in Brisbane, which was opened on 11 March 1878. Soon after this on 16 June 1885, David died in London where he had gone to have an operation.

In 1877, 15,700 acres (6,400 ha) were resumed from the Cressbrook pastoral run and offered for selection on 17 April 1877.

A partnership had been formed previously which saw Cressbrook owned by a company formed by David and his four sons, Henry, David Rose, Eric Walter and Edward John and their sister Mary McLeod Banks (née McConnel). This company, without David, continued to run Cressbrook for many years after his death. Through the 1880s Government resumptions of land for closer settlement reduced the Cressbrook holding until it was about 4 and 3/4 square miles.

In 1890 a condensed milk factory was established on the Cressbrook run by Henry McConnel and milk for this was supplied by a dairy at Cressbrook and many other surrounding farms, carved from the Cressbrook property, of which there were about thirty by 1910. The milk factory was sold, with 3,000 acres (1,200 ha), being about four farms, to the Nestles Anglo-Swiss Company in 1906, as finances continued in an unsettled way with the dissolution of the partnership and the purchase, by Henry McConnel of the Cressbrook Homestead and some 14,000 acres (5,700 ha) surrounding the residences and outbuildings by December 1907.

In 1901 a timber chapel, designed by renowned architect Robin Smith Dods was constructed, to the west of the principal residences and on a prominent position as one entered the property. The chapel was ecumenical, serving the religions of all creeds of the station workers and was built to commemorate the silver wedding anniversary of Henry and Madge McConnel. This was one of Dods' early ecclesiastical buildings, later he designed several other timber churches and chapels including Saint Andrews Anglican Church (1912) nearby at Toogoolawah, as well as many prominent masonry buildings as the Anglican Diocesan Architect. In about 1914, after the death of Henry, his wife organised for alterations to the House also designed by Dods, integrating the disparate verandahs lining the northern face of the building, with a large open pavilion, as well as some internal work.

A detailed plan of Cressbrook in 1910 was prepared by Kenneth McConnel for a publication by him, Planning the Australian Homestead (Ure Smith, Sydney, 1947). This details all of the buildings and structures within the vicinity of the principal residences and shows this area as a small township which included numerous outbuildings and homes for workers and their families. Provision was made for bachelors' quarters, married men's quarters, single men's quarters, a school house, chapel, various stores and shops along with stables, killing shed, milking baths, bull stables, hay shed, wagon shed and draft stables and cattle dip. Of these structures and buildings, many survive including two large tank stands, the draft stables, an explosives store, parts of the cattle dip, one of the bachelors' quarters and one of the married men's quarters.

Cressbrook continues through the twentieth century as a working pastoral station in the hands of the McConnel family.

== Description ==
Cressbrook Homestead comprises a number of buildings, structures and garden elements which are significant. The buildings include the principal house, known as the House with outbuildings, a secondary house, known as the Cottage, a timber chapel; an early stables; an explosives store; dairy complex, various animal shelters and two small residences.

The site is accessed along a gravel driveway which leads east into the complex over a small timber bridge. The House and Cottage are located to the north of the property overlooking the Brisbane River and adjacent river flats. The chapel, to the west of the Cottage, is one of the first buildings encountered on the approach to the complex. Various outbuildings extend to the east of the House, with the dairy complex at the extreme east of the listing boundary and other buildings on the south of the approach road.

=== The House ===
The House comprises some of the oldest buildings at Cressbrook, including an 1840s slab wing. The buildings forming the house are arranged such that the principal sections face northward and overlook the Brisbane River, with the kitchen wing and outbuildings forming a courtyard to the rear, southern side of the complex.

Specifically, the House comprises two vertical slab wings at right angles to one another and joined by a two storeyed corner section. To the rear of this large principal building are two smaller timber buildings, which complete a courtyard.

The corner section of the principal building, joining the two slab wings is a timber framed residence, clad with horizontal chamfered boards, single storeyed with a loft in the roof space. The building is clad with a corrugated iron gabled roof, the gabled ends on the northern and southern ends of the buildings. The pitch of the roof changes from being steep over the central core to a shallower pitch over the former verandah spaces. Two brick chimneys with corbelled tops project above the roof line.

The entrance elevation of this building faces west and has a centrally located recessed entrance to which access is provided through an adjacent arbor formed by vine on a timber and mesh trellis. Extending from the entrance door recess into the arbor is a timber boarded platform. The six panelled cedar entrance door is flanked by two long narrow rectangular window openings.

On the north elevation, overlooking the Brisbane River, this section of the house is lined with a verandah at the eastern end of which, the verandah expands to form an open pavilion space with hipped roof. This pavilion serves to connect the verandahs of this section and the two slab wings of the House. The verandah awning and pavilion roof are lined with fibrous cement ceilings braced with timber cover strips and the whole is supported on rectangular planned columns which taper towards the top. Simple timber dowel balustrading links the columns. Remnants of bamboo blinds painted cream and dark green in thin vertical strips, have been uncovered in recent maintenance work.

The interior of this section of the House is largely constructed from unpainted timber boarding, mostly red cedar though some of the ceilings in the internal rooms have been painted. Internally this section of the house is arranged around a central corridor running from the entrance on the east, parallel to the verandah on the north, to another door on the verandah on the east. The hall is divided to form an entrance vestibule on its western end by square planned timber columns, with mouldings articulating the base, body and capital of the columns.

The verandah along the western side of the building was infilled and rooms have been formed along this side, with access provided to them from the entrance vestibule. These rooms retain the sloping ceiling of the early verandah. The main hallway, from the entrance area, provides access to four rooms, which have a variety of internal timber cladding; wide vertical beaded boards and wide horizontal boards. Each of these four rooms have been fitted with a red cedar fireplace.

On the southern external wall of this section of the House is a straight timber stair leading to the loft area which runs centrally above the house, terminating in a small balcony on the northern elevation. The balcony is detailed with columns and balustrading similar to that of the ground floor verandah and pavilion.

The wing extending eastward, parallel to the Brisbane River, is a timber building constructed from vertical slabs with a hipped corrugated iron roof with shallower pitch over the verandahs which run along the north and south facades. The vertical timber slabs which make up the external walls are chamfered at the ends and fitted within beaded top and bottom plates and interspersed among the slabs are vertical uprights of sawn timber.

Internally this wing is divided into three main rooms, with smaller rooms created on the infilled verandah along the southern side. Openings from this wing include French doors and sliding six-pane windows.

The wing extending southward from the main house, the kitchen wing is constructed similarly to the eastward reaching wing, but with sawn vertical slabs. The steeply pitched corrugated iron roof of this wing changes pitch to form verandah awnings. A substantial brick chimney extends from the southern end of the wing.

There are five other timber buildings in the precinct of the House. A small asymmetrical cottage clad with horizontal boards and with a gable corrugated iron roof is situated forming the eastern boundary of the courtyard and has three rooms and a verandah facing the courtyard. To the east of this is a small but high one roomed single skinned and externally framed and braced building with a gabled corrugated iron roof and several unglazed window openings. Forming the southern boundary of the courtyard is another small two roomed building clad with vertical boards and with several sliding window openings. To the west of the southern wing of the House is another small timber cottage, clad with horizontal timber board.

One of the most prominent elements of the House precinct is a large bunya pine tree. This tree is located adjacent to the pavilion space on the verandah and is one of the oldest trees on the site.

=== The Cottage ===
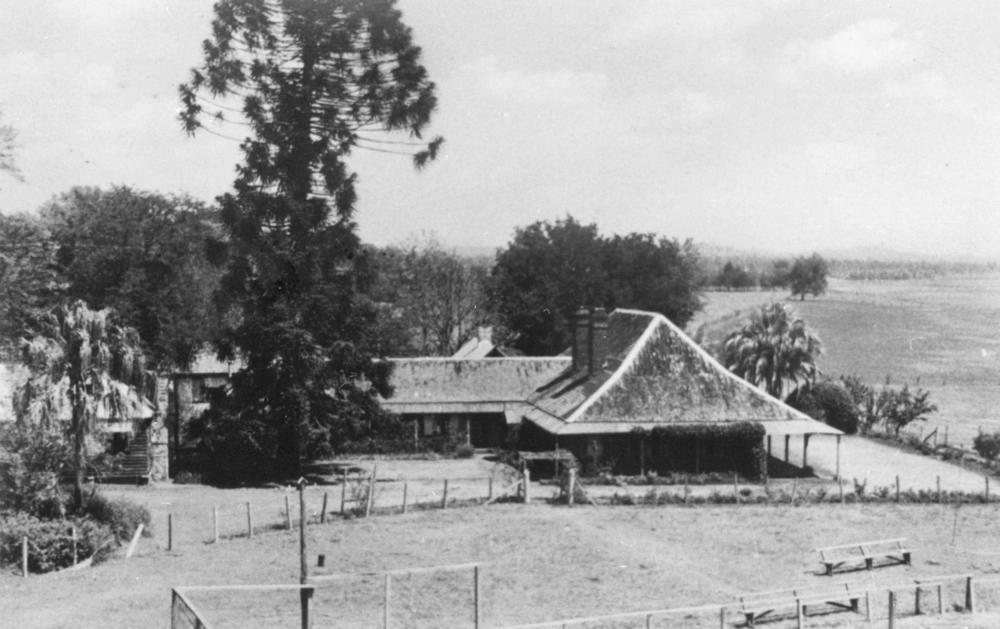
The Cottage, Cressbrook, overlooking the Brisbane River

The main section of the Cottage has a steeply pitched corrugated iron roof which becomes shallower at the line of the external walls, demarcating the verandah. To this roof a narrow corrugated iron awning is supported on slender timber brackets attached to the verandah posts on the northern elevation and on slender posts on the southern and eastern. Beneath the corrugated iron of the main roof an intact timber shingled roof survives.

The early part of the Cottage, at the eastern end of the present building, is constructed with a timber frame and brick nogging. This early structure has been lined with horizontal timber chamfered boarding, possibly when the western room was added which is timber framed and clad with similar chamfered boards. Sections of brick nogging have been left uncovered on the upper external walls.

Entrance to the cottage is through a small gabled awning on the south facing elevation which is supported on columns and identifies the place of entrance through the verandah. This small awning is emphasised by the placement of two substantial face brick chimney shafts projecting from the roof on this southern side symmetrically arranged on either side of the entrance, at the line on the roof where the pitch changes to accommodate the verandah.

The buildings at the western end of the Cottage are timber framed and clad with horizontal timber boards. Between these additions and the Cottage is an open concreted floor shelter space which is joined to the verandahs. An open extension used as a shelter for cars extends from the south of the Cottage, and consists of a corrugated iron gabled roof supported on timber posts.

As with the buildings forming the House precinct, the Cottage generally has sliding six paned window openings and French doors opening onto verandahs. From the entrance vestibule access is given to the infilled verandah flanking this area, and, to the north, access is provided to two of the principal three rooms of the house. One of these rooms, located centrally within the house has a large bay window opening onto the northern facing verandah. This extends with a rectangular plan into the verandah and houses four full length vertical sash windows which are framed in a timber structure of about 2.5 metres (8 ft 2 in) high and features shallow timber pilasters and the structure is surmounted by an entablature.

Internally the older sections of the Cottage have lath and plaster walls and ceilings, timber floors, and some original joinery. The upper parts of the walls taper in towards the room as they reach the ceiling. Chimney breasts are found in two of the early rooms, and towards the ceiling these taper outward. Remnants of early wall paper survive in several of the rooms, and efforts have been made by the present owners to repaper one of the rooms with a reconstructed paper.

Between the Cottage and the House is an early tennis court, which survives intact with boundary fencing, posts, surfacing and planting. Near the tennis court is a large and early set of two swings, supported on timber posts.

=== The Chapel ===
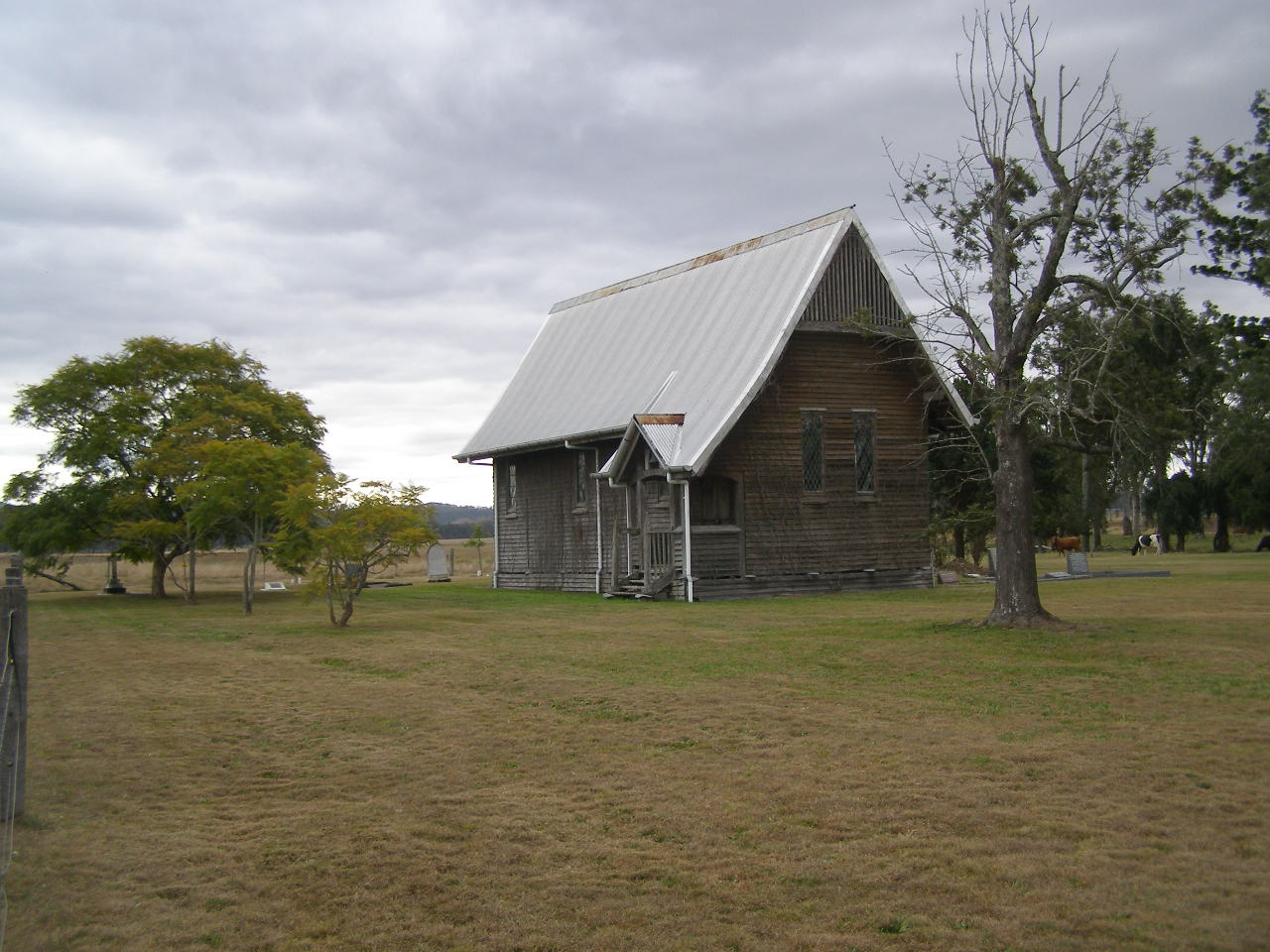
Cressbrook Homestead church and cemetery, 2010

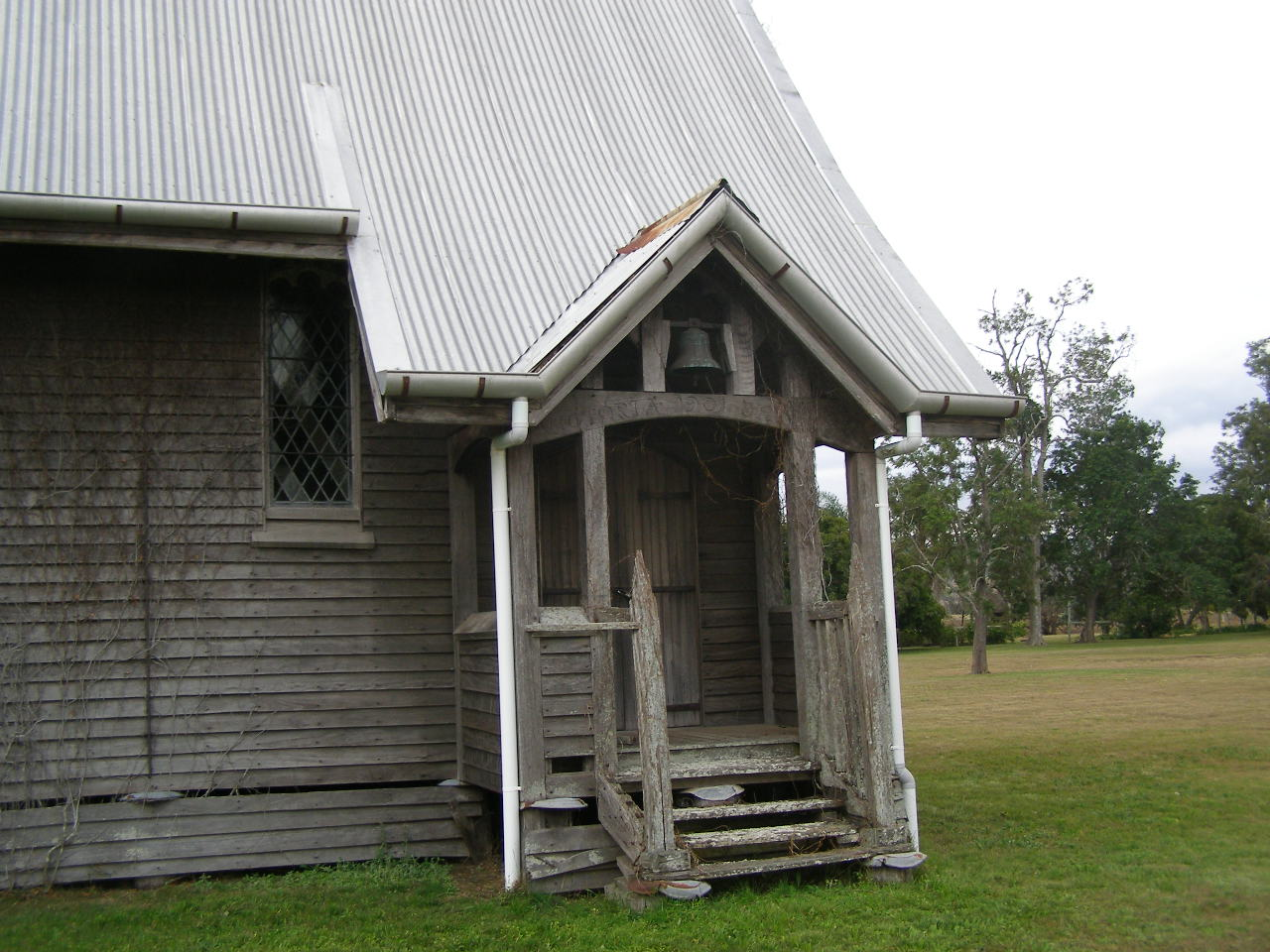
Church entrance, Cressbrook Homestead, 2010

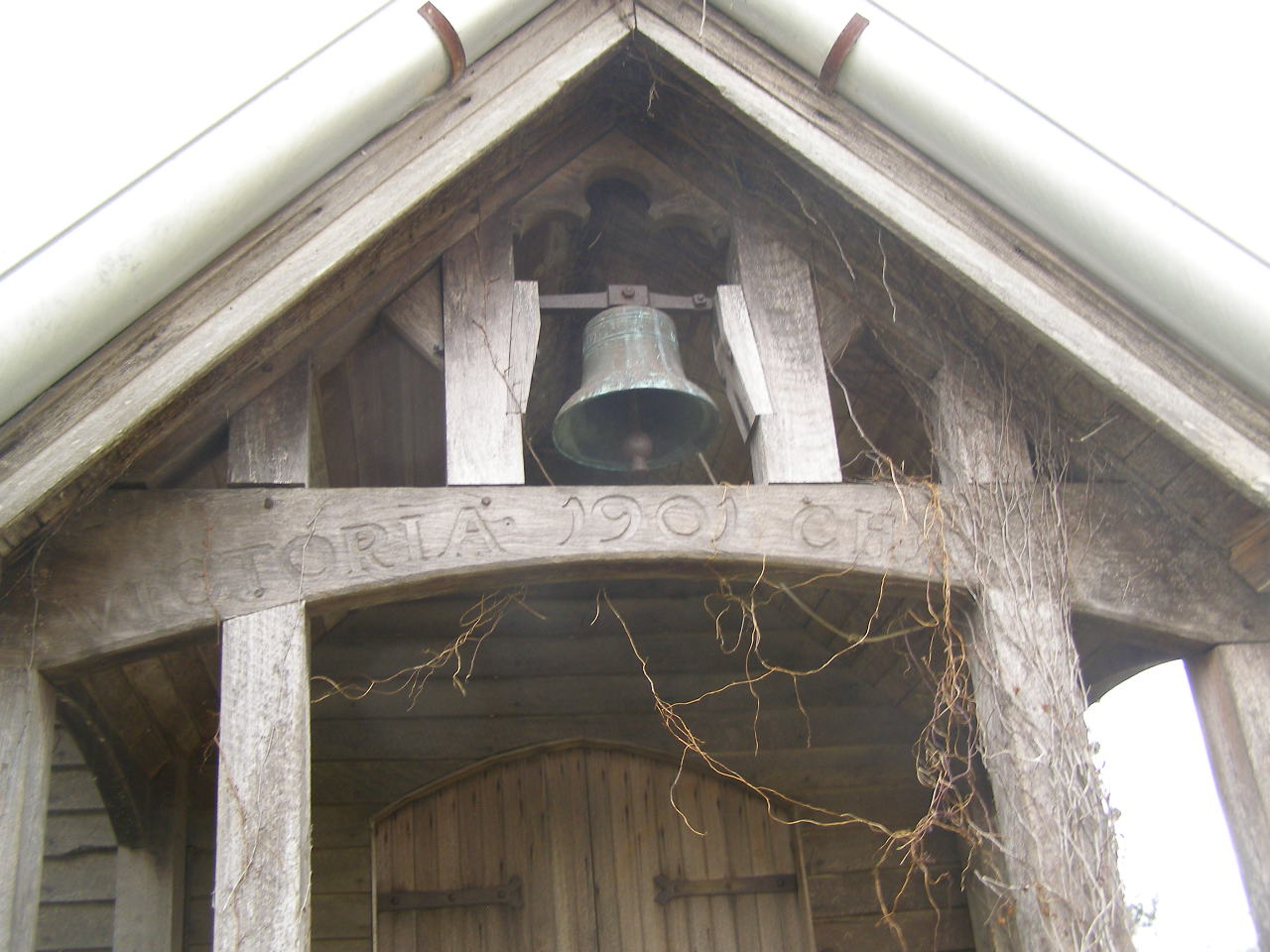
Church entrance detail, Cressbrook Homestead, 2010

The timber chapel at Cressbrook is one of the first buildings seen as one enters the property, situated to the south of the Cottage. Surrounding the chapel and adjacent graveyard is a recent timber, post and rail fence.

The Chapel is a rectangular building, consisting of a nave and a small side porch on the eastern end of the south facade of the building. The building has a steeply pitched corrugated iron roof which is gabled at the eastern and western ends with overhanging eaves. The eave overhang continues to form a roof for the porch, giving the otherwise symmetrical building, an asymmetrical form as the roof overhangs much further on the southern edge than on the northern. A timber battened panel is attached to the upper section plain barge boards of the gables on the east and west facades of the building.

The timber framed church is clad with horizontal timber boards and is slightly elevated on round timber stumps, though these and the cavity beneath the building are concealed with a timber boarded "skirt", which extends to the ground from the floor level allowing only the stump caps to be seen.

The eastern facade has two centrally located windows, of slender rectangular openings fitted with leadlight windows. Tracery divides the rectangular panels into three openings, a lancet-esque opening with tre-foiled arched head and, above this, two smaller tre-foiled shapes. The openings are glazed with diamond mullioned glass. A timber sill projects from the base of the windows.

Along both the northern and southern facades of the buildings are three similar window openings. The porch, which is reached on three open tread timber steps on the southern facade comprises a gabled awning projecting from the extended roof overhang. This is supported on timber columns with a timber lintel spanning the distance between the columns, carved with "VICTORIA 1901 CHAPEL". A bell hangs within the gable of the porch.

The porch provides access to the double timber boarded door which is braced with slender iron hinged brackets. The door opening is rectangular with a segmental arched head.

Internally, the chapel is a single space, divided into seven bays by the heavy hammer beam roof trusses. The cavities created between the hammerbeam and the roof lining is infilled with a carved timber detail. Likewise, the cavity between the collar beam and the roof is infilled with timber battening, similar to that of the battening in the gables of the exterior of the church. The line of the roof truss continues on the internal wall with slender timber pilasters. The walls of the church are lined with vertical timber boards and the ceiling is lined with similar boards running parallel to the nave of the church. At the western end of the chapel is a small platform extending on which sits three pieces of furniture; a lectern, altar table and chair, all designed in keeping with the building.

=== Outbuildings ===
Many early outbuildings and structures survive at Cressbrook including two tank stands, draft stables, an explosives store, dairy complex, cattle dip and early workers' residences.

Two tank stands survive, one round stand between the House and Cottage and another, square stand near the explosives store at the eastern end of the built up area at Cressbrook. The stands comprise a large number of timber posts extending many metres upwards, forming a dense "forest" of columns. The iron tanks surmounting these structures survive, corrugated iron on the circular stand, and cast iron on the square stand.

As of June 2017 aerial photography shows that the larger tank stand appears to have been dismantled. Two support posts remain in place; the holes for the 20+ other posts are visible. The posts can be seen stored not far away. There is no obvious sign of the corrugated iron. This may be a consequence of demolition or refurbishment in process.

A large open shed comprising an expansive hipped corrugated iron roof supported on timber posts forms part of the early draft stables. This building houses an early carriage, apparently acquired by the McConnels from the Queensland Government when a present was made to the Government of some red deer which were freed near Cressbrook. On the northern side of the stables is a large recess, where the roof is cut out.

A small explosives store is situated to the east of the stables and this is a small rectangular planned building constructed of prefabricated concrete blocks, and has a hipped roof. Several small residences survive on the southern side of the approach drive, this are mainly timber framed and clad buildings some with verandahs and garages.

A dairy complex survives at the eastern end of this built up area and this comprises a number of interconnected open shed with corrugated iron roofs supported on timber posts. Holding yards abutting the dairy also survive. Sections of the cattle dip and several other outbuildings along with extensive early fencing and shelters survive on this southern side of the approach road.

Significant early plantings and gardens survive at Cressbrook.

== Heritage listing ==
Cressbrook Homestead was listed on the Queensland Heritage Register on 21 October 1992 having satisfied the following criteria.

The place is important in demonstrating the evolution or pattern of Queensland's history.

Cressbrook Homestead was established by David Cannon McConnel in 1841, the first run taken in the Brisbane Valley. The run demonstrates the development of Queensland, particularly the Brisbane River Valley area in the 1840s, after it was opened to settlement with the closure of the penal colony. The property illustrates the development of pastoral practices in Queensland, particularly the development of dairying in the Brisbane River Valley.

The place demonstrates rare, uncommon or endangered aspects of Queensland's cultural heritage.

Cressbrook has many rare built elements including an early 1840s slab hut; a timber chapel with fittings designed by Robin Dods; an 1860s timber framed and brick nogged house and various other 1860s buildings. The site remains remarkably intact, though continual additions have been made very few early structures have been removed from the site.

The place has potential to yield information that will contribute to an understanding of Queensland's history.

The early date of Cressbrook with its many extant features suggest that a potential exists for further historical and archaeological research which may yield information which will contribute to an understanding of early Queensland station life.

The place is important in demonstrating the principal characteristics of a particular class of cultural places.

The place is important in demonstrating the principal characteristics of an early Queensland pastoral station. The arrangement of the early buildings and their relationship to the working farm and outbuildings provides important evidence of early station life. The chapel is an important and characteristic example of the work of renowned architect, Robin S. Dods. The early station buildings are good intact examples of slab huts constructed in the mid-nineteenth century.

The place is important because of its aesthetic significance.

Cressbrook has enormous aesthetic significance; the entire site has a picturesque quality resulting from the layering of various periods of building construction over 150 years and the siting of these buildings overlooking the Brisbane River. The chapel has significant architectural merit as a well designed example of Australian Arts and Crafts ecclesiastical architecture adapted for Queensland conditions. The quality of this building including materials, detailing, siting, composition of the external facades, fittings and furniture, is exceptional.

The chapel is designed by Robin Dods in Queensland.

The place has a strong or special association with a particular community or cultural group for social, cultural or spiritual reasons.

Cressbrook has special associations with the Brisbane River Valley community as their first settled station and a place of employment for many hundreds of local residents and their families many of whom remain in the area.

The place has a special association with the life or work of a particular person, group or organisation of importance in Queensland's history.

The place is associated with the prominent McConnel family who still own Cressbrook and were instrumental in the development of the Valley and the town of Esk; also with Robin Dods who designed the chapel and extensions to the House.
