= Junction View, Queensland =

Junction View
- Suburb
- Interactive map of Junction View
- Coordinates: 27.8108°S 152.1830°E
- Country: Australia
- State: Queensland
- LGA: Lockyer Valley Region
- Location: 38.5 km (23.9 mi) NE of Clifton; 55.8 km (34.7 mi) SE of Gatton; 60.0 km (37.3 mi) SE of Toowoomba; 125 km (78 mi) WSW of Brisbane

Government
  - State electorate: Lockyer
  - Federal division: Wright

Area
  - Total: 27.9 km^{2} (10.8 sq mi)

Population
  - Total: 60 (2021 census)
  - Density: 2.15/km^{2} (5.6/sq mi)
- Time zone: UTC+10:00 (AEST)
- Postcode: 4343
Suburbs around Junction View
West Haldon	West Haldon	Woodbine
West Haldon	Junction View	Lefthand Branch
Hirstglen	Black Duck Creek	East Haldon

Junction View is a rural locality in the Lockyer Valley Region, Queensland, Australia. In the 2021 census, Junction View had a population of 60 people.

== History ==
Black Duck State School (also known as Black Duck Creek State School) opened in 1910 on 2 acres (0.81 ha) of land donated by Mr E. J. Easement in 1909 in neighbouring Black Duck Creek. In 1922, the school buildings were moved to the Junction, ready for re-opening as Junction View State School from 18 August 1922. The Black Duck State School site was sold by the Queensland Government in 1985. Junction View State State School was mothballed on 31 December 2008 and closed on 31 December 2010. It was at 7 East Haldon Road (27.8012°S 152.1886°E). The school's website was archived.

== Demographics ==
In the 2016 census, Junction View had a population of 52 people.

In the 2021 census, Junction View had a population of 60 people.

== Education ==
There are no schools in Junction View. The nearest government primary school is Mount Sylvia State School in Mount Sylvia to the north-east. The nearest government secondary schools are Lockyer District State High School in Gatton to the north-east and Clifton State High School in Clifton to the south-west.

== Amenities ==
Junction View Community Hall is at 275 Mount Sylvia Road.
