= Ropeley, Queensland =

Ropeley
- Suburb
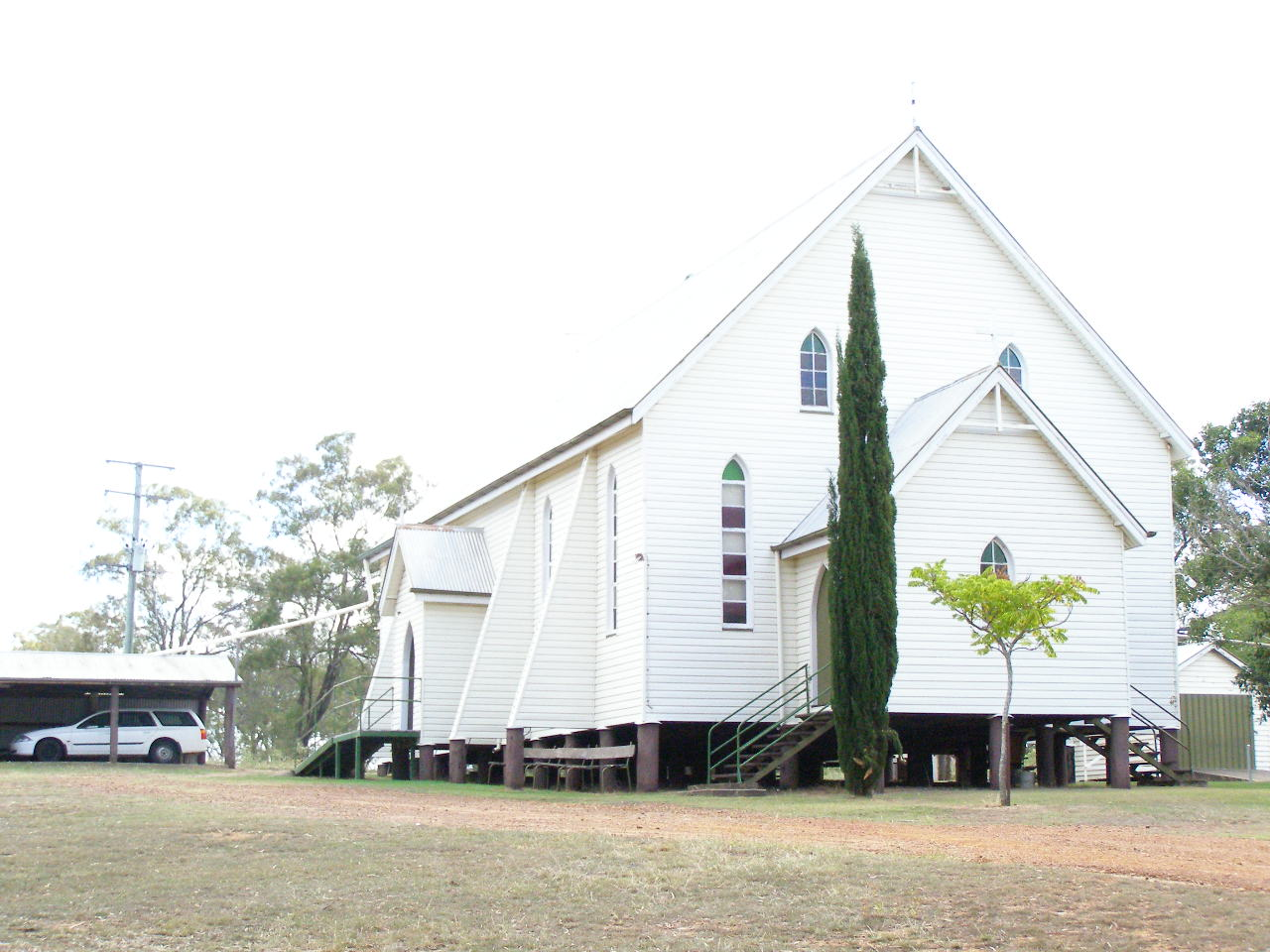
- Ropeley Immanuel Lutheran Church, 2006

- Interactive map of Ropeley
- Coordinates: 27.6563°S 152.2638°E
- Country: Australia
- State: Queensland
- LGA: Lockyer Valley Region
- Location: 15.9 km (9.9 mi) S of Gatton; 43.1 km (26.8 mi) ESE of Toowoomba; 63.8 km (39.6 mi) W of Ipswich; 107 km (66 mi) W of Brisbane

Government
  - State electorate: Lockyer
  - Federal division: Wright

Area
  - Total: 27.2 km^{2} (10.5 sq mi)

Population
  - Total: 206 (2021 census)
  - Density: 7.57/km^{2} (19.62/sq mi)
- Time zone: UTC+10:00 (AEST)
- Postcode: 4343
Suburbs around Ropeley
Lower Tenthill	Woodlands	Blenheim
Upper Tenthill	Ropeley	Blenheim
Upper Tenthill	Ingoldsby	Rockside

Ropeley is a rural locality in the Lockyer Valley Region, Queensland, Australia. In the 2021 census, Ropeley had a population of 206 people.

== Geography ==
Ropeley East is a neighbourhood in the east of the locality (27.65°S 152.2833°E).

== History ==
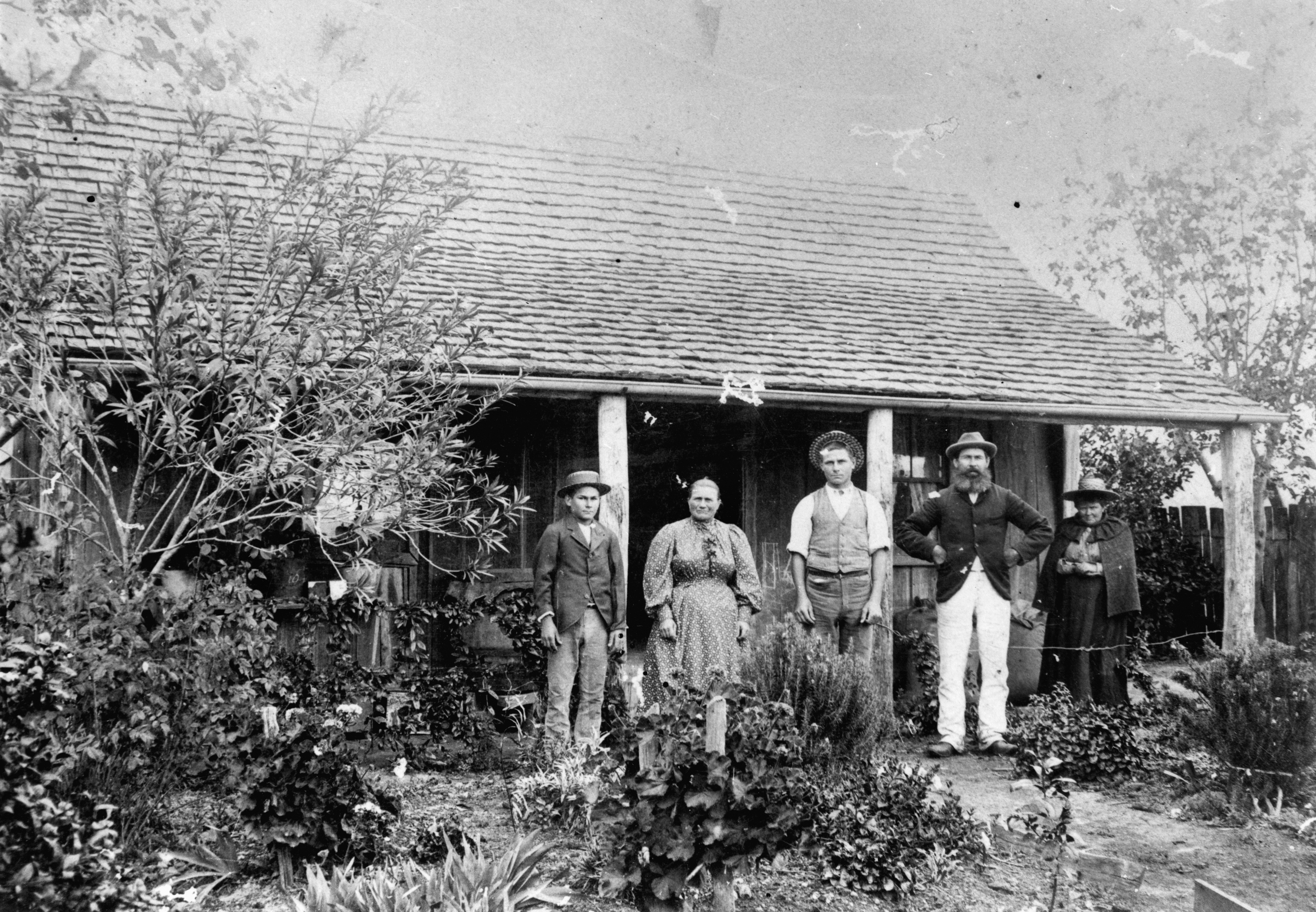
Rosenblatt family posing outside a wooden dwelling, Ropeley, Queensland

The Deep Gully Provisional School opened in 1890 and in 1892 was renamed Ropeley Provisional School. On 2 September 1901, it became Ropeley State School. The school celebrated its centenary in 1990.

Ropeley East State School opened on 4 May 1915 as an "open air school" (a tent-like structure). At some time after the closure of Rockside State School in 1921, its school building was relocated to Ropeley East State School. Ropeley East State School closed in 1955.

This Lutheran congregation at Ropeley formed in 1886. The Ropeley Immanuel Lutheran Church was officially opened on Sunday 4 February 1923 with a crowd of approximately 1,200 people. The opening of the church brought together two previously separate Lutheran congregations in the district.

On Sunday 21 June 1914 the Ropeley Apostolic Church was officially opened and dedicated by Reverend Heinrich Frederick Nieumeyer. The church building was 30 by 21 feet (9.1 by 6.4 m) with an 8 feet (2.4 m) vestry and a 5 feet (1.5 m) square porch with a belfry and bell. The land was donated by August Schneider. The church was built by Mr L. Roberts for £140 with volunteers assisting with the carting. The altar was built from cedar by Mr Laffey of Left-Hand Branch, Mount Sylvia, to a design by Mr Roth of Laidley.

== Demographics ==
In the 2011 census, Ropeley had a population of 232 people.

In the 2016 census, Ropeley had a population of 194 people.

In the 2021 census, Ropeley had a population of 206 people.

== Education ==
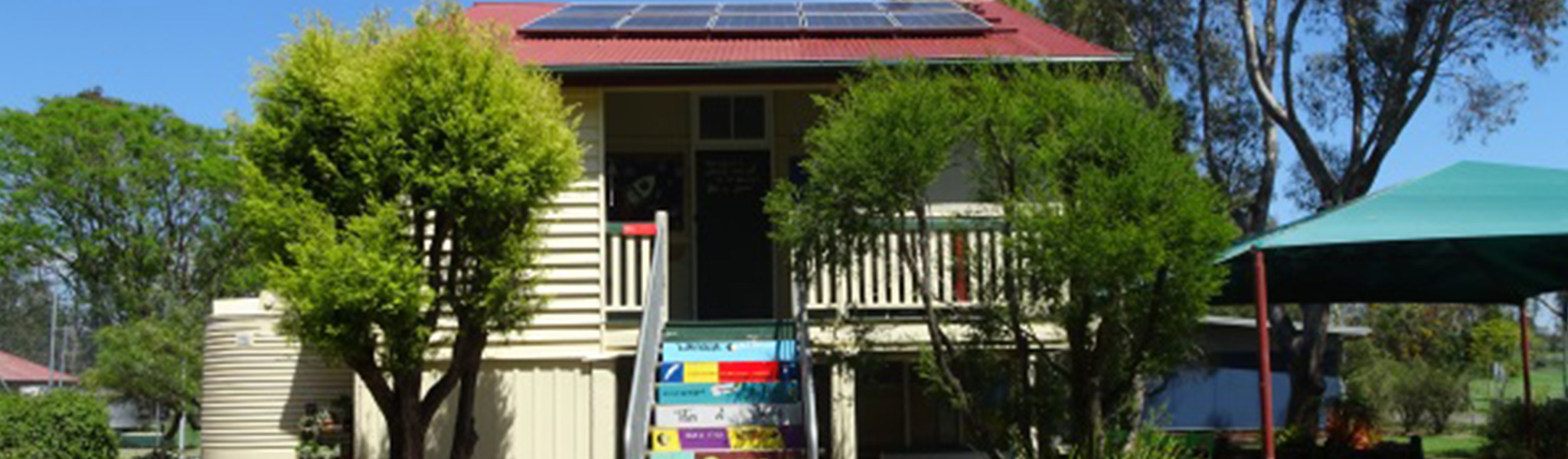
Ropeley State School

Ropeley State School is a government primary (Prep-6) school for boys and girls at 4 Hoger Road (27.6579°S 152.2587°E). In 2013, the school had 11 enrolled students with two teaching staff (one equivalent full-time). In 2015, only one child was enrolled. In 2018, the school had an enrolment of 5 students with 2 teachers (1 full-time equivalent) and 4 non-teaching staff (1 full-time equivalent). As at 2023, the school is officially open, but, in the absence of any enrolled students, it is not operating.

There are no secondary schools in Ropeley. The nearest government secondary school is Lockyer District State High School in Gatton to the north.

== Amenities ==
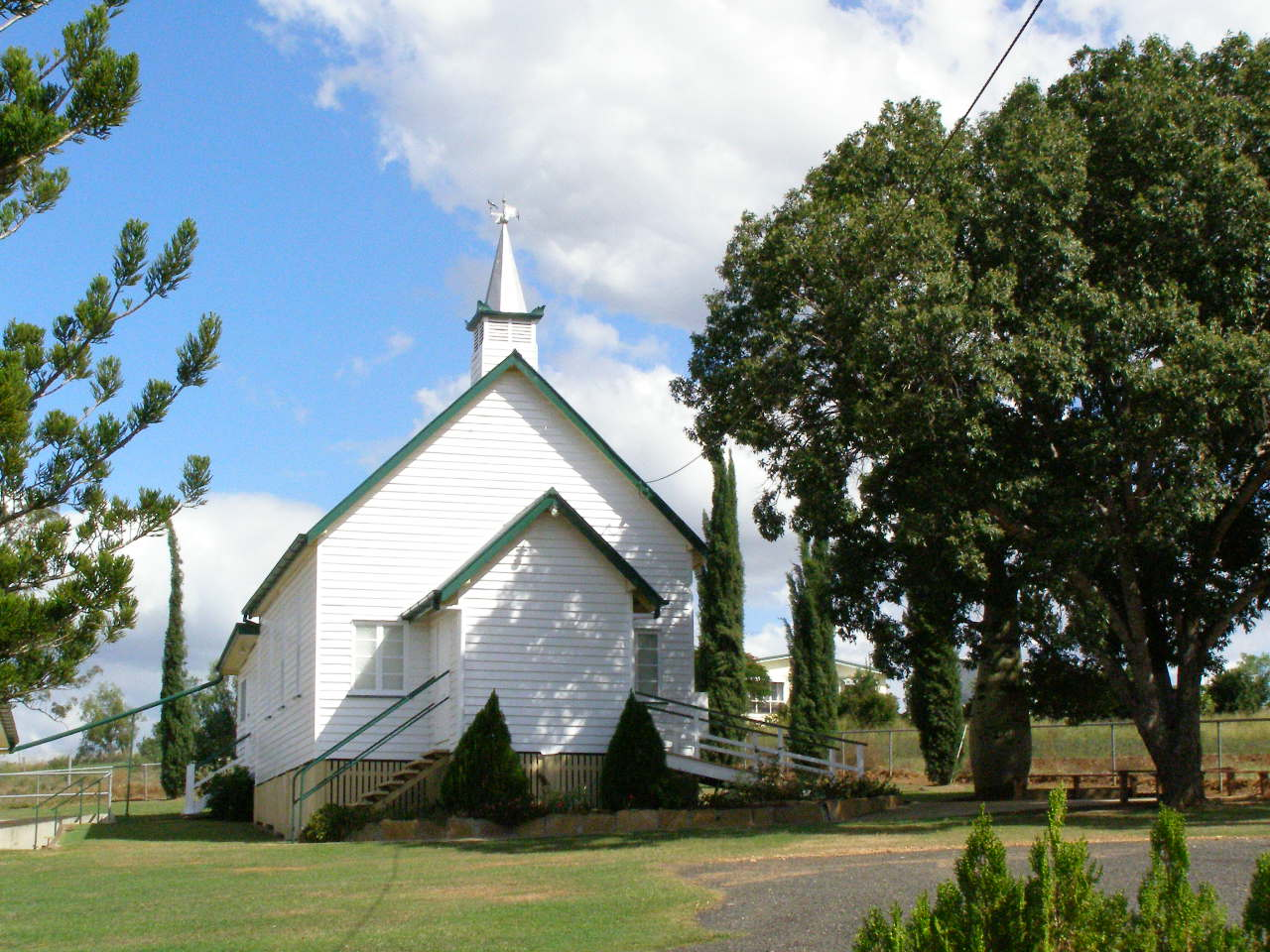
Ropeley Apostolic Church, 2016

Ropeley Immanuel Lutheran Church is at 400 Ropeley Rockside Road (27.6443°S 152.2539°E). It holds weekly Sunday services.

Ropely Apostolic Church is at 86 Steinmullers Road (27.6587°S 152.2485°E).

Ropeley has two cemeteries:

- Ropeley Immanuel Lutheran cemetery, adjacent to the church (27.6455°S 152.2538°E)
- Ropeley Scandinavian Lutheran cemetery, associated with the former Scandinavian Lutheran congregation (27.6717°S 152.2627°E)
