= Rockside, Queensland =

Rockside
- Suburb
- Interactive map of Rockside
- Coordinates: 27.7025°S 152.2847°E
- Country: Australia
- State: Queensland
- LGA: Lockyer Valley Region
- Location: 19.6 km (12.2 mi) S of Gatton; 27.1 km (16.8 mi) WSW of Laidley; 46.7 km (29.0 mi) ESE of Toowoomba CBD; 72.8 km (45.2 mi) W of Ipswich CBD; 111 km (69 mi) WSW of Brisbane

Government
  - State electorate: Lockyer
  - Federal division: Wright

Area
  - Total: 18.6 km^{2} (7.2 sq mi)

Population
  - Total: 29 (2021 census)
  - Density: 1.559/km^{2} (4.04/sq mi)
- Time zone: UTC+10:00 (AEST)
- Postcode: 4343
Suburbs around Rockside
| Ropeley | Blenheim | Blenheim |
| Ingoldsby | Rockside | Mount Berryman |
| Ingoldsby | Ingoldsby | Mount Berryman |

Rockside is a rural locality in the Lockyer Valley Region, Queensland, Australia. In the 2021 census, Rockside had a population of 29 people.

== Geography ==
The creek Deep Gully rises in Mount Berryman to the south-east and enters Rockside from the south-east, flowing in a north-westerly direction and exiting the locality to the north-west (Ropeley).

Ropeley Rockside Road enters the locality from the north-west (Ropeley) and loosely follows the course of Deep Gully bere exiting to the south-east (Mount Berryman).

The land use is predominantly grazing on native vegetation.

== History ==
Rockside Provisional School on 2 June 1902 with Henry Arthur Trone as the first teacher. On 1 January 1909, it became Rockside State School. It closed on 5 April 1921. The school building was subsequently relocated to Ropeley East State School.

In 1932, there were 12 children in the district and a new school was requested. In February 1936, tenders were called to erect a new school at Rockside. The school building was completed by early June 1936. In late June 1936, it was announced that the school would also serve as the Rockside Post Office. On 8 July 1936, the school re-opened still using the name Rockside State School. On Saturday 12 September 1936, the school was officially opened by Ted Maher, the Member of the Queensland Legislative Assembly representing Rosewood, who gave a speech encouraging people to have more children to reverse the falling birthrate. It was followed by a picnic. The school closed on 16 March 1952. It was at 1131 Ropeley Rockside Road (27.69343°S 152.28392°E).

== Demographics ==
In the 2016 census, Rockside had a population of 44 people.

In the 2021 census, Rockside had a population of 29 people.

== Education ==
There are no schools in Rockside. The nearest government primary schools are Ropeley State School in neighbouring Ropeley to the north-west, Mount Sylvia State School in Mount Sylvia to the south-west, and Blenheim State School in neighbouring Blenheim to the north-east. The nearest government secondary schools are Lockyer District State High School in Gatton to the north and Laidley State High School in Laidley to the north-east. There are also Catholic primary schools in Gatton and Laidley and a Lutheran primary school in Gatton.
