= Mount Berryman, Queensland =

Mount Berryman
- Suburb
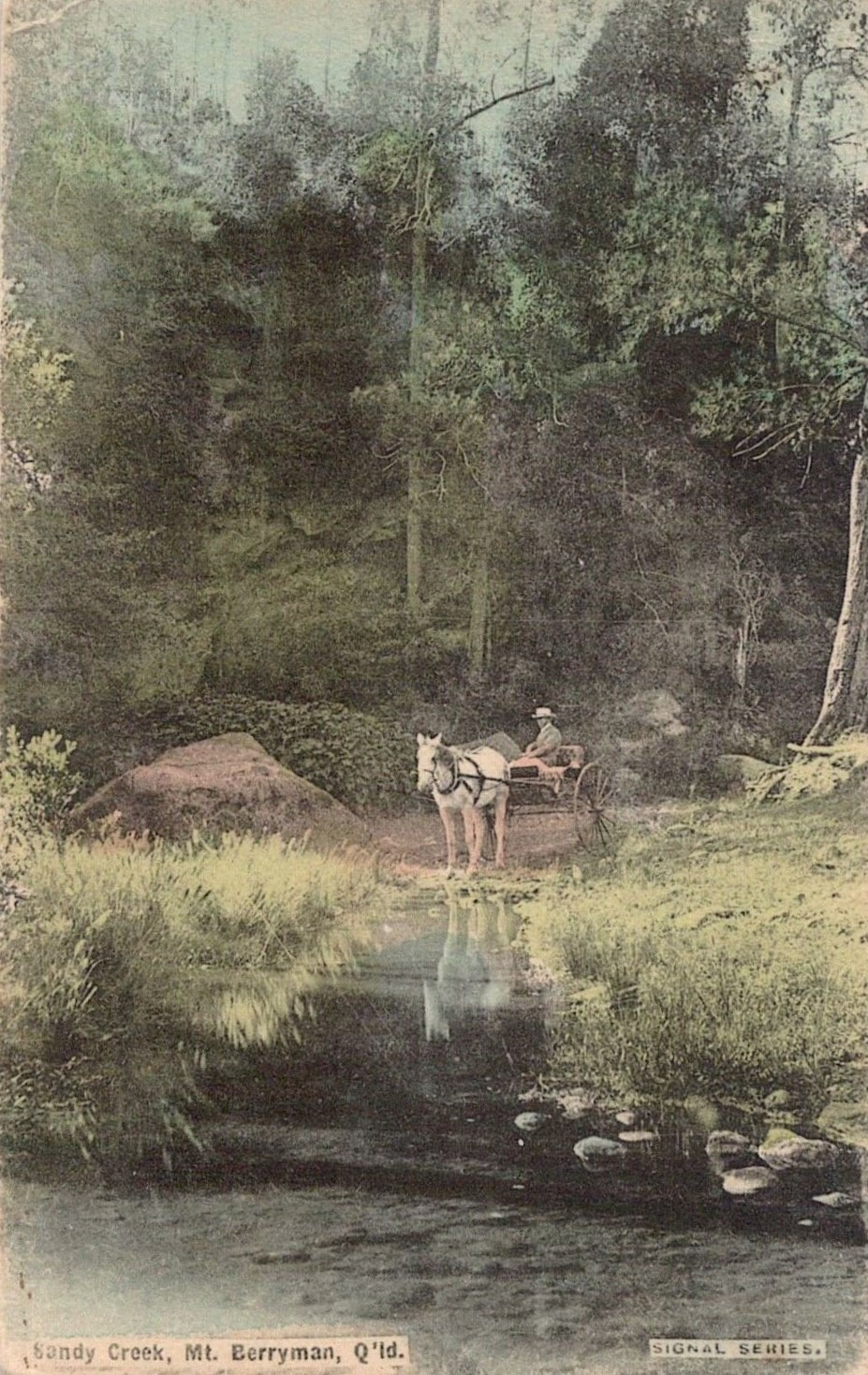
- Sandy Creek at Mount Berryman, early 1900s

- Interactive map of Mount Berryman
- Coordinates: 27.7191°S 152.3249°E
- Country: Australia
- State: Queensland
- LGA: Lockyer Valley Region
- Location: 17.9 km (11.1 mi) SW of Laidley; 24.5 km (15.2 mi) S of Gatton; 56.1 km (34.9 mi) WSW of Ipswich; 60.1 km (37.3 mi) ESE of Toowoomba; 101 km (63 mi) WSW of Brisbane

Government
  - State electorate: Lockyer
  - Federal division: Wright

Area
  - Total: 26.8 km^{2} (10.3 sq mi)

Population
  - Total: 96 (2021 census)
  - Density: 3.582/km^{2} (9.28/sq mi)
- Time zone: UTC+10:00 (AEST)
- Postcode: 4341
Suburbs around Mount Berryman
Rockside	Blenheim	Laidley Creek West
Rockside	Mount Berryman	Mulgowie
Ingoldsby	Thornton	Mulgowie

Mount Berryman is a rural locality in the Lockyer Valley Region, Queensland, Australia. In the 2021 census, Mount Berryman had a population of 96 people.

== Geography ==
Sandy Creek enters the locality from the south (Thornton) and exits to the north (Blenheim). The terrain varies from 160 to 660 metres (520 to 2,170 ft) above sea level with the lower elevations by the creek and rising to the east and west of the creek. Despite the name of the locality, there is no mountain feature of that same name.

The land use is predominantly grazing on native vegetation.

Mount Berryman Road enters the locality from the north (Blenheim), loosely follows the creek (crossing it from time to time), and exists to the south (Thornton).

== History ==
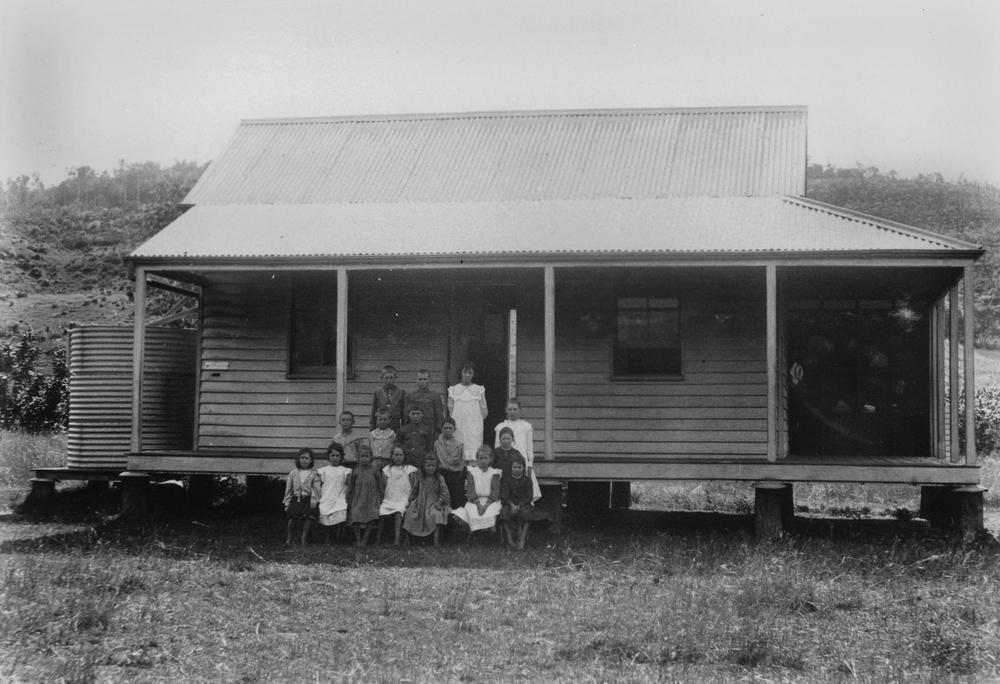
Mount Berryman School, 1907

The district was originally known as Upper Sandy Creek.

In 1880s, when local residents applied to the Queensland Government to establish a school, they proposed that the school be established in a building on a selection taken up by Richard Berryman which he subsequently abandoned. The government agreed to the plan, but objected to calling the school Upper Sandy Creek due to Sandy Creek being a very common name in Queensland, so the residents proposed to name it Mount Berryman. Mount Berryman State School opened on 25 May 1886 and closed on 27 May 1977. It was at 72 Mount Berryman Road (27.7088°S 152.3280°E).

In 1894, a non-denominational Sunday school was established using the school building. From 1907, the Blenheim Baptist Church took over the responsibility for the Sunday School. The Sunday school celebrated its diamond jubilee in 1954.

In 1943, the former Methodist Church building at Blenheim was relocated to Mount Berryman on land donated by Mr H. Wood and opened as the Mount Berryman Baptist Church. In 2007, the Mount Berryman Baptist Church was relocated to the Laidley Pioneer Village.

== Demographics ==
In the 2016 census, Mount Berryman had a population of 109 people.

In the 2021 census, Mount Berryman had a population of 96 people.

== Education ==
There are no schools in Mount Berryman. The nearest government primary schools are Blenheim State School in neighbouring Blenheim to the north, Laidley District State School in Laidley to the north-west, and Mount Sylvia State School in Mount Sylvia to the west. The nearest government secondary schools are Laidley State High School in Laidley and Lockyer District State High School in Gatton to the north.
