= Ingoldsby, Queensland =

Ingoldsby
- Suburb
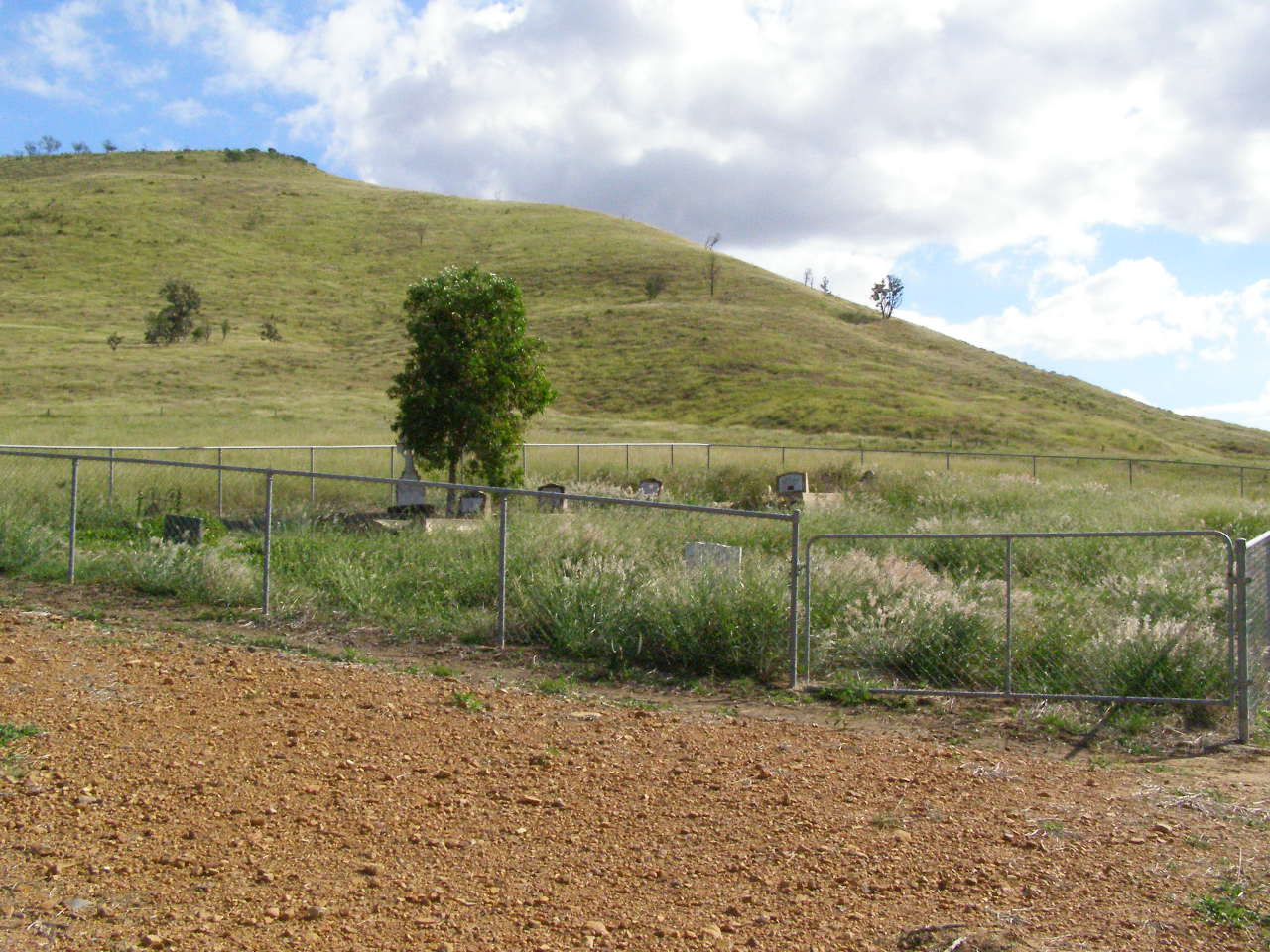
- Lutheran Cemetery, Ingoldsby, 2006

- Interactive map of Ingoldsby
- Coordinates: 27.7366°S 152.2663°E
- Country: Australia
- State: Queensland
- LGA: Lockyer Valley Region
- Location: 17.7 km (11.0 mi) S of Gatton; 43.1 km (26.8 mi) SE of Toowoomba; 109 km (68 mi) WSW of Brisbane

Government
  - State electorate: Lockyer
  - Federal division: Wright

Area
  - Total: 29.9 km^{2} (11.5 sq mi)

Population
  - Total: 64 (2021 census)
  - Density: 2.140/km^{2} (5.54/sq mi)
- Time zone: UTC+10:00 (AEST)
- Postcode: 4343
Suburbs around Ingoldsby
Upper Tenthill; Caffey	Ropeley	Rockside
Mount Sylvia	Ingoldsby	Mount Berryman
Lefthand Branch	Lefthand Branch	Thornton

Ingoldsby, formerly known as Hessenburg (German: [ˈhɛsn̩bʊʁk] HESS-en-boork), is a rural locality in the Lockyer Valley Region, Queensland, Australia. In the 2021 census, Ingoldsby had a population of 64 people.

== History ==
Hessenburg Provisional School opened on 11 June 1894. On 1 January 1909, it became Hessenburg State School. Due to anti-German sentiment during World War I, the district was renamed Ingoldsby and in 1916 the school was renamed Ingoldsby State School. It closed on 9 August 1974. It was at 1128-1130 Ingoldsby Road (27.7222°S 152.2616°E).

== Demographics ==
In the 2016 census, Ingoldsby had a population of 70 people.

In the 2021 census, Ingoldsby had a population of 64 people.

== Education ==
There are no schools in Ingoldsby. The nearest government primary schools are Mount Sylvia State School in neighbouring Mount Sylvia to the west and Ropeley State School in neighbouring Ropeley to the north. The nearest government secondary school is Lockyer District State High School in Gatton to the north. There are also non-government schools in Gatton.

== Facilities ==
Ingoldsby Lutheran Cemetery is on Ingoldsby Road (27.7084°S 152.2489°E).
