= Caffey =

Caffey can be a surname or place name.

== People ==
- Charlotte Caffey (born 1953), American musician and songwriter
- Erin Caffey, American murderer
- Francis Gordon Caffey (1868–1951), American federal judge
- Jason Caffey (born 1973), American basketball player
- Lee Roy Caffey (1941–1994), American football player

== Places ==
- Caffey, Queensland, a rural locality in the Lockyer Creek Region, Queensland, Australia
