= Tenthill =

Tenthill may refer to:

- Lower Tenthill, Queensland, a locality in the Lockyer Valley Region, Queensland, Australia
- Upper Tenthill, Queensland, a locality in the Lockyer Valley Region, Queensland, Australia
