= Woodbine, Queensland =

Woodbine
- Suburb
- Interactive map of Woodbine
- Coordinates: 27.7777°S 152.2063°E
- Country: Australia
- State: Queensland
- LGA: Lockyer Valley Region
- Location: 7.9 km (4.9 mi) SW of Mount Sylvia; 31.0 km (19.3 mi) SSW of Gatton; 55.1 km (34.2 mi) SE of Toowoomba CBD; 124 km (77 mi) WSW of Brisbane

Government
  - State electorate: Lockyer
  - Federal division: Wright

Area
  - Total: 10.2 km^{2} (3.9 sq mi)
- Elevation: 198–809 m (650–2,654 ft)

Population
  - Total: 27 (2021 census)
  - Density: 2.65/km^{2} (6.86/sq mi)
- Time zone: UTC+10:00 (AEST)
- Postcode: 4343
Suburbs around Woodbine
Mount Sylvia	Mount Sylvia	Mount Sylvia
West Haldon	Woodbine	Mount Sylvia
Junction View	Junction View	Lefthand Branch

Woodbine is a rural locality in the Lockyer Valley Region, Queensland, Australia. In the 2021 census, Woodbine had a population of 27 people.

== Geography ==
The elevation of the locality ranges between 198 to 809 metres (650 to 2,654 ft) above sea level with the lower lying land around Blackfellow Creek in the north and west of the locality and the higher elevations in south and east of the locality. The highest point of the locality is on the upper slopes of Mount Michael in the southernmost point of the locality, whose the peak is just over the boundary in neighbouring Junction View to the south.

The main road route through the locality is Mount Sylvia Road which enters the locality from the north (Mount Sylvia) and exits to the south-west of the locality (Junction View).

The land use is predominantly irrigated horticulture in the lower elevations near the creeks in the north and west of the locality and grazing on native vegetation in the higher elevations in the south and east of the locality.

== Demographics ==
In the 2016 census, Woodbine had a population of 20 people.

In the 2021 census, Woodbine had a population of 27 people.

== Education ==
There are no schools in Woodbine. The nearest government primary school is Mount Sylvia State School in neighbouring Mount Sylvia to the north. The nearest government secondary school is Lockyer District State High School in Gatton to the north. There is also a Catholic primary school in Gatton as well as a numbere of non-government schools in Toowoomba and its suburbs.
