= Upper Tenthill, Queensland =

Upper Tenthill
- Suburb
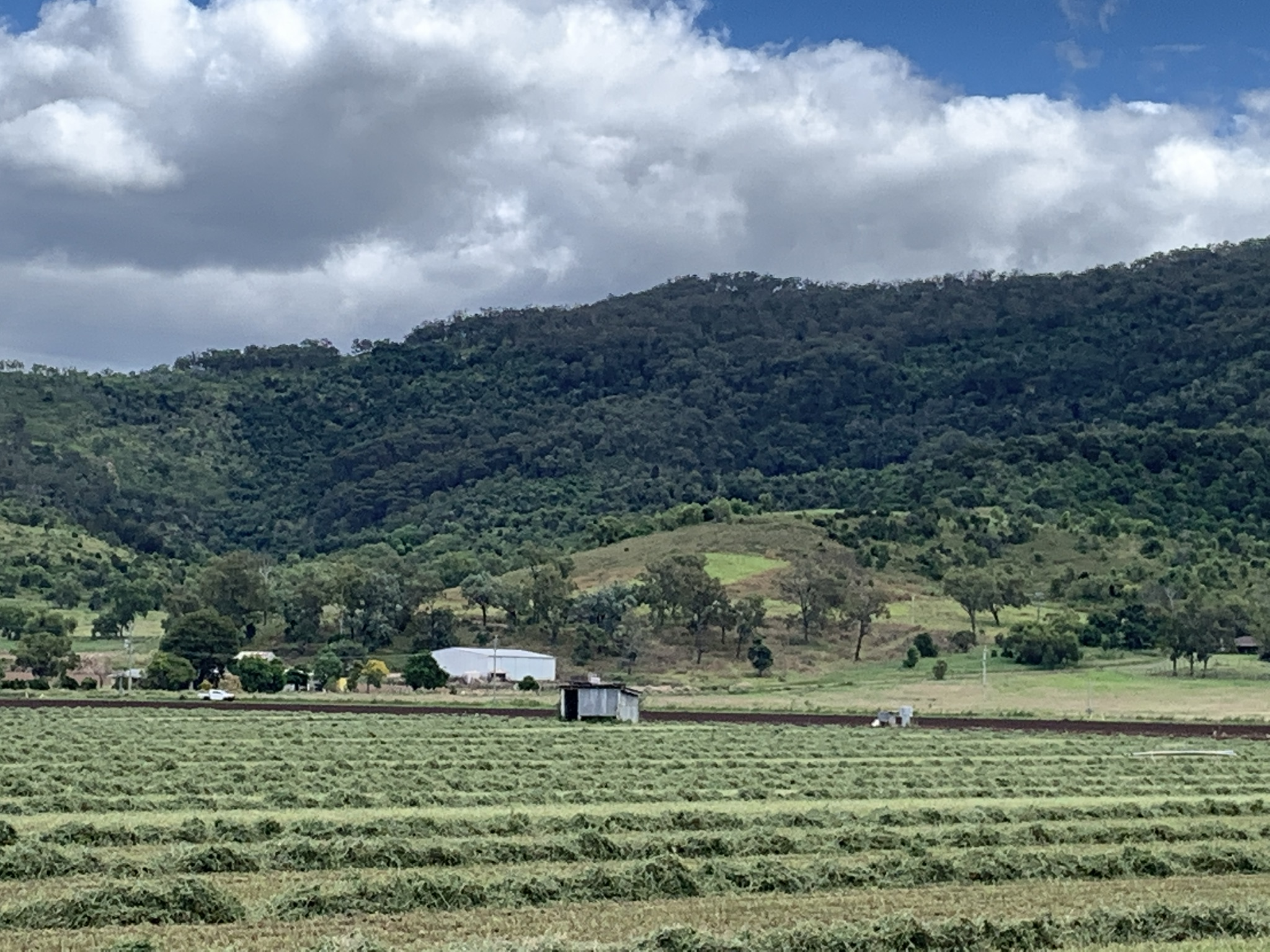
- Rural landscape, 2022

- Interactive map of Upper Tenthill
- Coordinates: 27.6572°S 152.2163°E
- Country: Australia
- State: Queensland
- LGA: Lockyer Valley Region
- Location: 14.8 km (9.2 mi) SW of Gatton; 37.3 km (23.2 mi) ESE of Toowoomba; 106 km (66 mi) WSW of Brisbane

Government
  - State electorate: Lockyer
  - Federal division: Wright

Area
  - Total: 24.6 km^{2} (9.5 sq mi)

Population
  - Total: 273 (2021 census)
  - Density: 11.10/km^{2} (28.74/sq mi)
- Time zone: UTC+10:00 (AEST)
- Postcode: 4343
Suburbs around Upper Tenthill
Ma Ma Creek	Lower Tenthill	Lower Tenthill
Mount Whitestone	Upper Tenthill	Ropeley
Caffey	Caffey	Ingoldsby

Upper Tenthill is a rural locality in the Lockyer Valley Region, Queensland, Australia. In the 2021 census, Upper Tenthill had a population of 273 people.

== Geography ==
Tenthill Creek forms part of the southern boundary before flowing through to form a small part of the northern boundary. Wonga Creek forms a small part of the southern boundary on its way to join the Tenthill.

Tenthill is a neighbourhood on the Ingoldsby Road (27.6666°S 152.2333°E).

== History ==
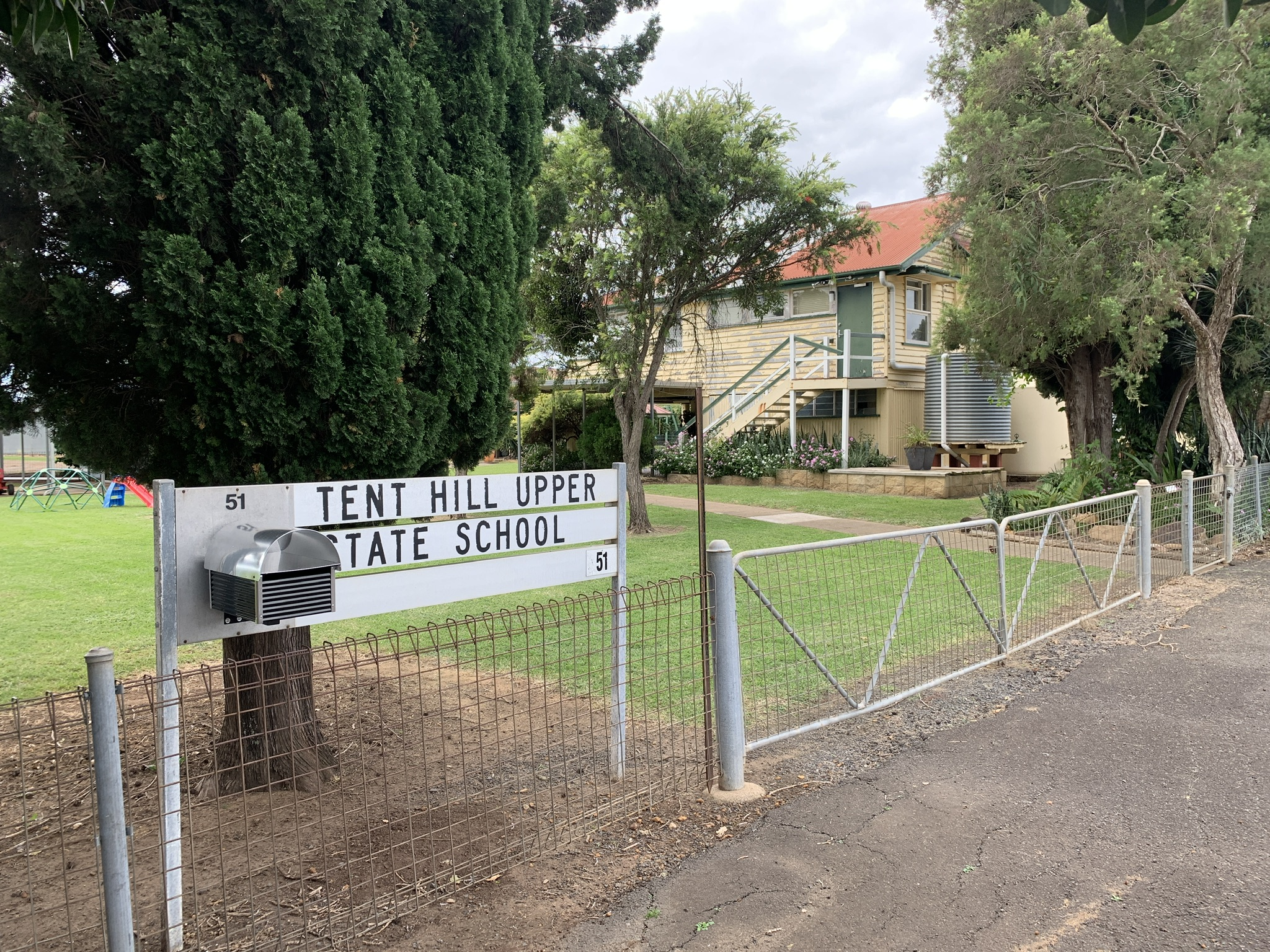
Tenthill Upper State School, 2022

The name Tenthill comes from the name of a pastoral property established by 1845 by Phillip Friell.

Tent Hill Upper State School opened on 27 August 1877; it closed on 31 December 2002. It was at 51 Upper Tenthill School Road (27.6574°S 152.2265°E).

Congregational services were initially held in the home of F.C. Kingston, the manager of the T.B. Cribb's Upper Tenthill property. In June 1881 the congregation called for tenders the construction of the Tenthill Congregational Church on land donated by James Logan. The plans and specification were prepared at no charge by Mr. A MacGregor of Ipswich and it was constructed by Mr H. Percy for £78 10s. The church was 28 by 16 feet (8.5 by 4.9 m) and opened on 18 December 1881. It closed in November 1979. It was relocated to the Gatton Historical Village on 19 August 1984 where it was restored and rededicated on Sunday 4 November 1984. It is used as a wedding chapel.

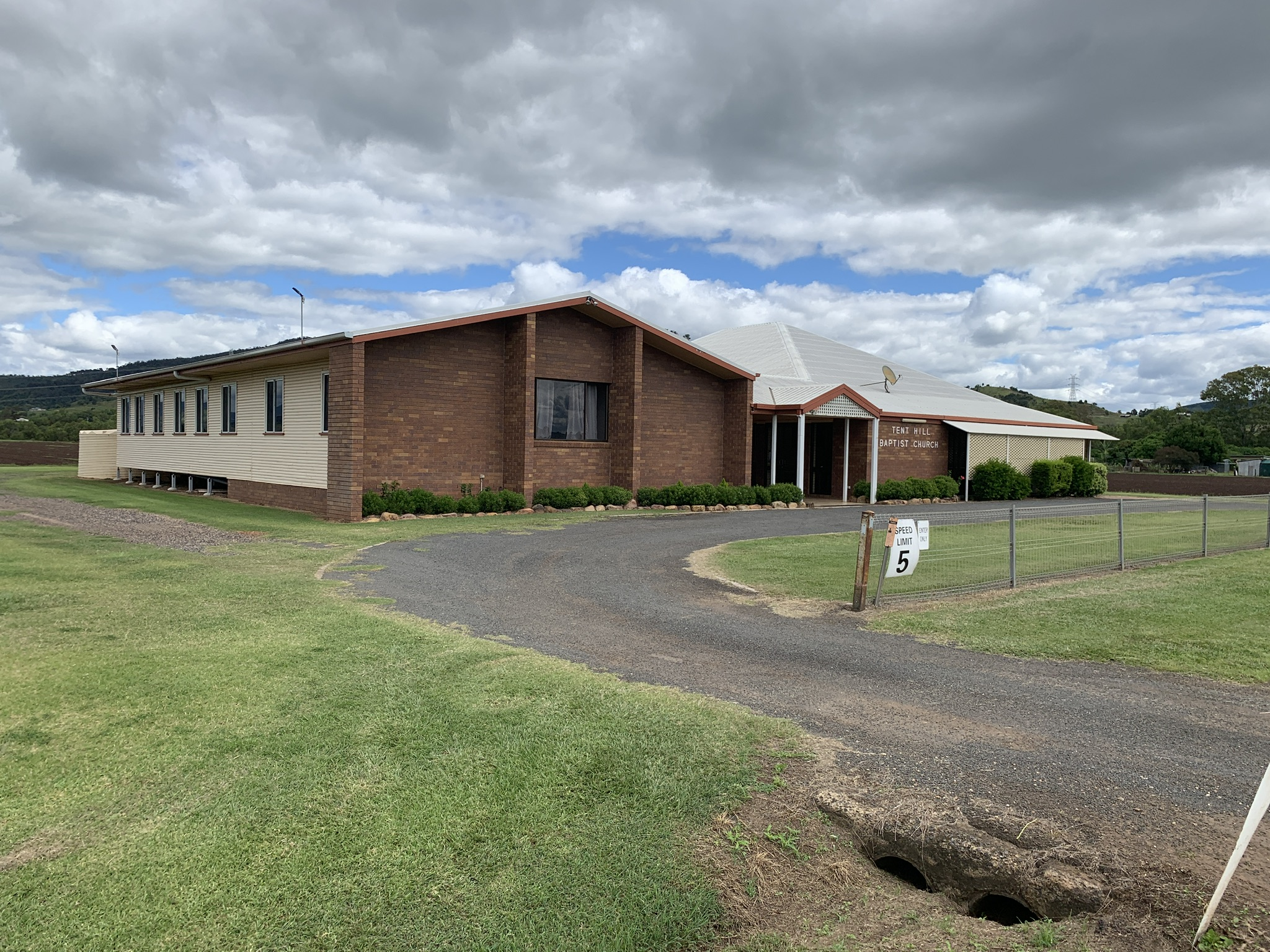
Tenthill Baptist Church erected in 1951, as seen in 2022

A Baptist congregation had formed by 1881. In 1902, a Baptist church opened in Tent Hill. A new church was built in 1951.

In the 1980s, Australian country music singer-songwriter Stan Coster held his Stan Coster Show at the Tenthill Hotel to crowds too large to be accommodated in the hotel. Following his death in 1997, a memorial to Coster was unveiled by Bob Katter at the Tenthill Hotel Carpark on Saturday 27 May 2000.

== Demographics ==
In the 2016 census, Upper Tenthill had a population of 234 people.

In the 2021 census, Upper Tenthill had a population of 273 people.

== Education ==
There are no schools in Upper Tenthill. The nearest government primary schools are:

- Ropeley State School in neighbouring Ropeley to the east
- Mount Sylvia State School in Mount Sylvia to the south
- Mount Whitestone State School in neighbouring Mount Whitestone to the west
- Ma Ma Creek State School in neighbouring Ma Ma Creek to the north-west

The nearest government secondary school is Lockyer District State High School in Gatton to the north-east.

== Amenities ==
Tenthill Baptist Church is at 979 Tenthill Creek Road (27.6337°S 152.2173°E).

== Attractions ==
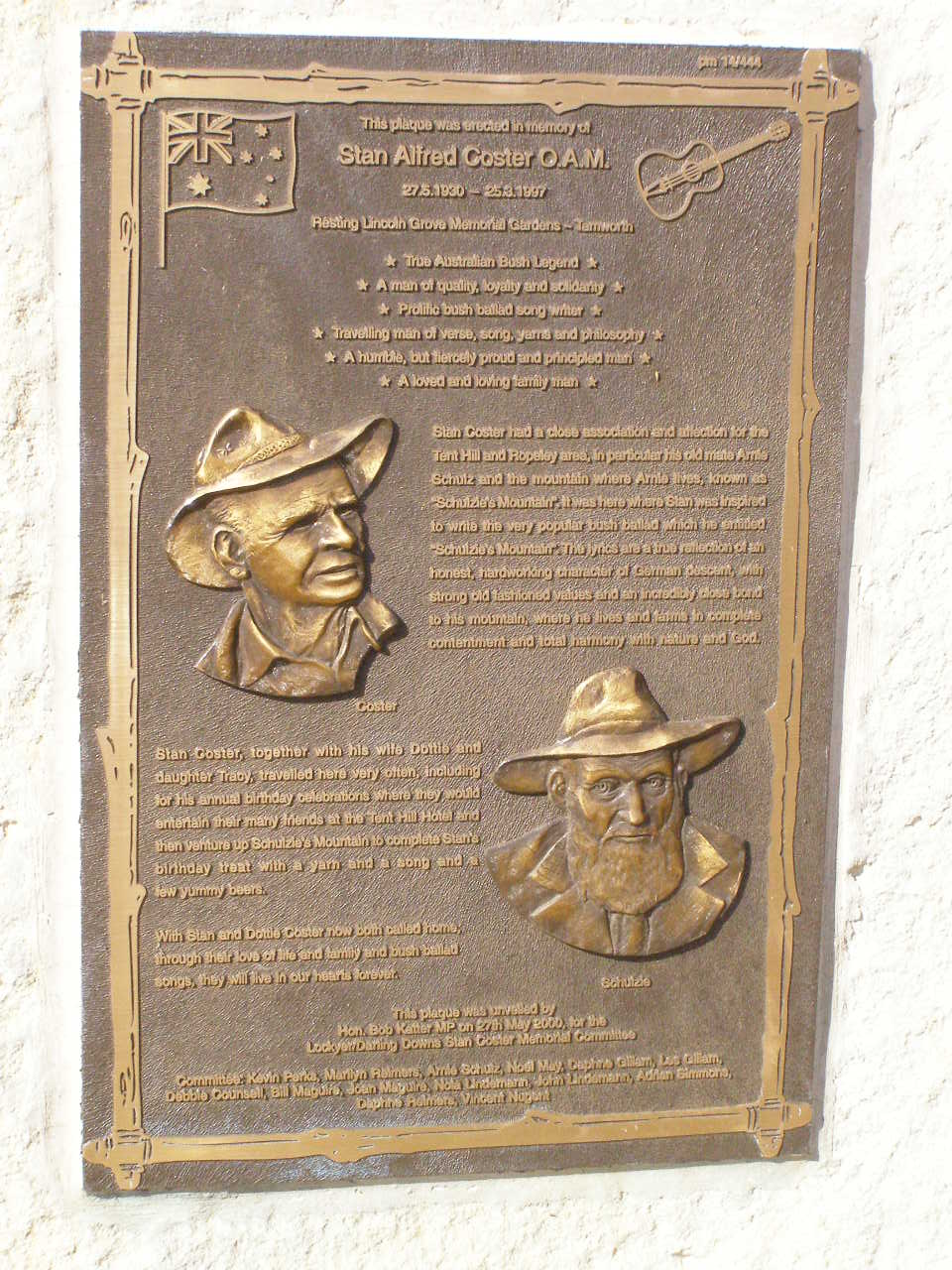
Stan Coster memorial, 2006

There is a monument to Australian country music singer-songwriter Stan Coster at the Tenthill Hotel Carpark, 220 Mount Sylvia Road (27.6344°S 152.2142°E).
