= Laidley Valley (Mulgowie) railway line =

Former railway line in Queensland, Australia

The Laidley Valley Branch Railway, also known as the Mulgowie railway line, connected Laidley to Mulgowie in Queensland, Australia. It was 11 kilometres long, making the line one of the shortest in Queensland.

== History ==
The line was the culmination of 30 years agitation to access the rich agricultural area along Laidley Creek.

The line was opened on Wednesday 19 April 1911 by the Queensland Treasurer, Walter Barnes.

The line was never profitable, servicing an agricultural valley with a low population density. The initial twice-daily service was reduced to once daily in 1918 and reduced again to a twice weekly service in the 1930s. The line reached its greatest popularity in 1914 when 1,285 people travelled on the line - by 1950 the average use was one passenger every three weeks. Freight averaged ninety tons a year in the early years, but by the late 1930s this had dropped to 38 tons a week. By 1954, there was barely enough freight to fill a single wagon. A possible extension to Thornton did not materialise, and once an all-weather road was constructed the uneconomic branch closed in 1955, although 1.3 kilometres of the line to the Laidley cattle yards continued in service until 1969.

== Route ==
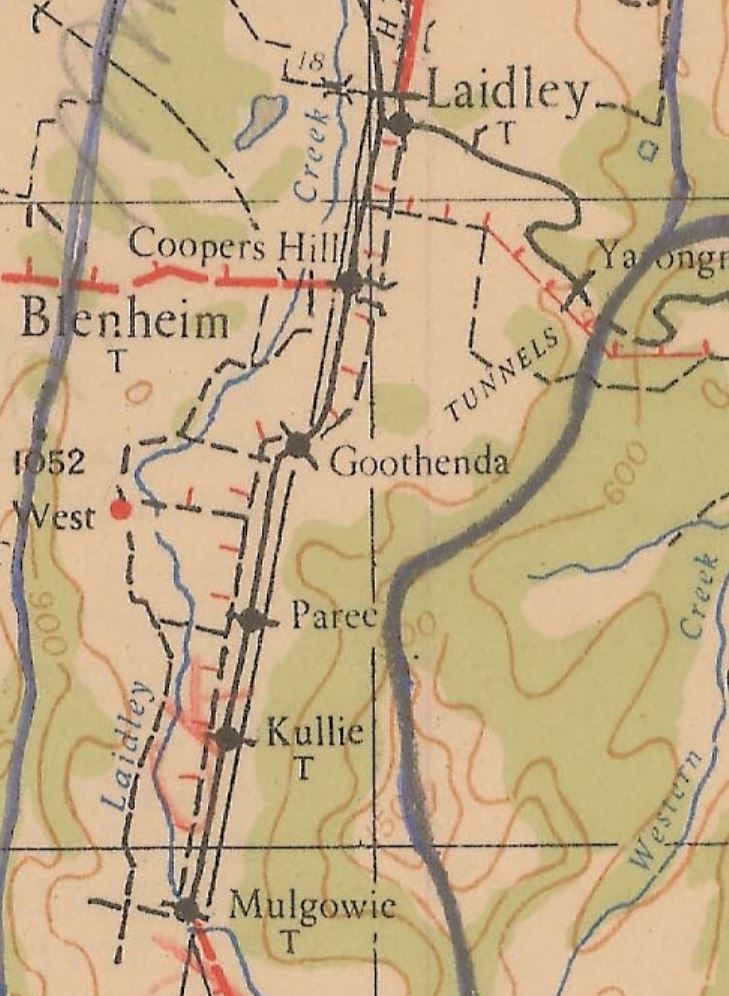
Mulgowie railway line, 1942

Branching from the Main line at Laidley and passing through Cooper's Hill, Goothenda, Paree and Kullee, it terminated at Mulgowie.

Distance from Laidley	Station	Present locality	Coordinates	Altitude	Notes
	Laidley	Laidley	27.62838°S 152.39329°E	338 feet (103 m)	Named after the town.
1 mile 30 chains (2.2 km)	Cooper's Hill	Laidley South	27.6572°S 152.3847°E	363 feet (111 m)	Named after a long-time local resident and farmer.
3 miles 14 chains (5.1 km)	Goothenda	Laidley South	27.6705°S 152.3775°E	371 feet (113 m)	Named using an Aboriginal word meaning forest country.
4 miles 70 chains (7.8 km)	Paree	Laidley South	27.6938°S 152.3711°E	407 feet (124 m)	Named using an Aboriginal word meaning black soil.
5 miles 78 chains (9.6 km)	Kullee	Mulgowie	27.7119°S 152.3680°E	424 feet (129 m)	Named using an Aboriginal word meaning fresh water.
7 miles 12 chains (11.5 km)	Mulgowie	Mulgowie	27.72503°S 152.36565°E	453 feet (138 m)	Named after the local area.

== See also ==
- Rail transport in Queensland
