= Townson, Queensland =

Townson
- Suburb
- Interactive map of Townson
- Coordinates: 27.8997°S 152.3763°E
- Country: Australia
- State: Queensland
- LGA: Lockyer Valley Region
- Location: 32.4 km (20.1 mi) S of Laidley; 45.4 km (28.2 mi) SSE of Gatton; 69.1 km (42.9 mi) SW of Ipswich; 81 km (50 mi) SE of Toowoomba; 111 km (69 mi) SW of Brisbane

Government
  - State electorate: Lockyer
  - Federal division: Wright

Area
  - Total: 92.4 km^{2} (35.7 sq mi)
- Elevation: 200–1,070 m (660–3,510 ft)

Population
  - Total: 52 (2021 census)
  - Density: 0.563/km^{2} (1.458/sq mi)
- Time zone: UTC+10:00 (AEST)
- Postcode: 4341
Suburbs around Townson
Lefthand Branch	Thornton	Mount Mort
East Haldon	Townson	Rosevale
Goomburra	Tarome	Moorang

Townson is a rural locality in the Lockyer Valley Region, Queensland, Australia. In the 2021 census, Townson had a population of 52 people.

== Geography ==
Townson is a mountainous area. It is bounded to the west by the ridge of the Mistake Mountains range and to the east by the ridge of the Little Liverpool Range. Mount Mistake (27.8752°S 152.3336°E) is part of the Mistake Mountains range in the north-west of the locality. It is 998 metres (3,274 ft) above sea level. Grass Tree Knob (27.9038°S 152.4052°E) is a peak in the Little Liverpool Range in the east of the locality. It is 751 metres (2,464 ft).

Laidley Creek rises in the south of the locality (27.9694°S 152.3973°E) and flows north along the valley between the two ranges, exiting at Thornton at 27.85012°S 152.3907°E. At this point the elevation is down to 200 metres (660 ft) above sea level, considerably lower than the 1,070 metres (3,510 ft) elevation of the western ridge line.

Mulgowie Townson Road is the only access through the locality and runs from Thornton towards the south to the west of Laidley Creek.

The land use along the valley floor along Laidley Creek is cropping. The more sloping land on the lower sides of the mountains are used for grazing on native vegetation. A part of the west of the locality (including Mount Mistake) is within the Main Range National Park which extends into a number of neighbouring localities: East Haldon, Goomburra, Tarome, and Moorang.

== History ==
The Townson Provisional School opened in 1895. The school closed in 1903 but reopened in 1907, later becoming Townson State School. The school closed on 27 January 1964. It was on the Mulgowie Townson Road at 27.8875°S 152.3840°E.

== Demographics ==
In the 2016 census, Townson had a population of 38 people.

In the 2021 census, Townson had a population of 52 people.

== Education ==
There are no schools in Townson. The nearest government primary school is Thornton State School in neighbouring Thornton to the north. The nearest government secondary school is Laidley State High School in Laidley to the north.
