= Mulgowie, Queensland =

Mulgowie
- Suburb
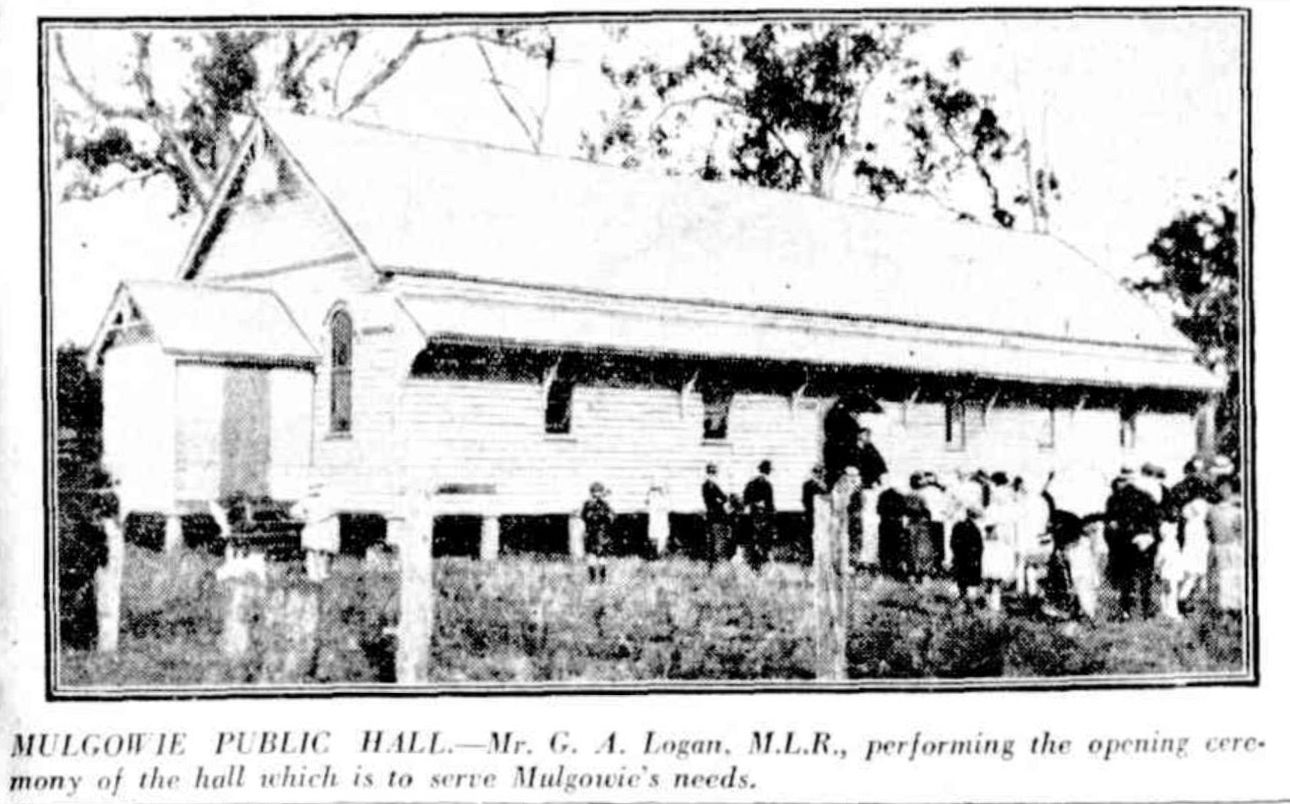
- Mulgowie Public Hall, at the time of its opening, November 1924

- Interactive map of Mulgowie
- Coordinates: 27.7208°S 152.3752°E
- Country: Australia
- State: Queensland
- LGA: Lockyer Valley Region
- Location: 12.5 km (7.8 mi) S of Laidley; 27.9 km (17.3 mi) SE of Gatton; 51.1 km (31.8 mi) WSW of Ipswich; 71.1 km (44.2 mi) ESE of Toowoomba; 92.7 km (57.6 mi) WSW of Brisbane

Government
  - State electorate: Lockyer
  - Federal division: Wright

Area
  - Total: 42.3 km^{2} (16.3 sq mi)

Population
  - Total: 166 (2021 census)
  - Density: 3.924/km^{2} (10.16/sq mi)
- Time zone: UTC+10:00 (AEST)
- Postcode: 4341
Suburbs around Mulgowie
Laidley Creek West	Laidley South	Grandchester
Mount Berryman	Mulgowie	Mount Mort
Thornton	Thornton	Thornton

Mulgowie is a rural locality in the Lockyer Valley Region, Queensland, Australia. In the 2021 census, Mulgowie had a population of 166 people.

== Geography ==
Kullee is a neighbourhood in the locality (27.7166°S 152.35°E).it takes its name from the Kullee railway station assigned by the Queensland Railways Department on 28 August 1913. The name Kullee is an Aboriginal word meaning fresh water.

== History ==
The locality is named after Mount Mulgowie, which in turn has an Aboriginal name meaning big round hill.

Burnside State School opened on 22 January 1877. In 1919, it was renamed Mulgowie State School. It closed on 12 December 1997. It was on Mulgowie School Road (27.7374°S 152.3622°E).

Mulgowie Public Hall was opened on Saturday 11 October 1924 by George Logan, the local Member of the Queensland Legislative Assembly. The hall was relocated from Laidley, where it was known as the Norman Hall. It was cut into two halves and taken by Mulgowie by bullock team where it was re-erected by the creek. In the 2000s, it was relocated to its current location and extended.

On Wednesday 19 April 1911, Laidley Valley (Mulgowie) railway line was officially opened from Laidley to Mulgowie by the Queensland Treasurer, Walter Barnes. It closed in 1955.

== Demographics ==
In the 2016 census, Mulgowie had a population of 175 people.

In the 2021 census, Mulgowie had a population of 166 people.

== Education ==
There are no schools in Mulgowie. The nearest government primary schools are Thornton State School in neighbouring Thornton to the south and Laidley District State School in Laidley to the north. The nearest government secondary school is Laidley State High School in Laidley.
