= Lefthand Branch, Queensland =

Lefthand Branch
- Suburb
- Interactive map of Lefthand Branch
- Coordinates: 27.7897°S 152.2625°E
- Country: Australia
- State: Queensland
- LGA: Lockyer Valley Region
- Location: 30.3 km (18.8 mi) S of Gatton; 52.4 km (32.6 mi) SE of Toowoomba; 84.4 km (52.4 mi) WSW of Ipswich; 121 km (75 mi) WSW of Brisbane

Government
  - State electorate: Lockyer
  - Federal division: Wright

Area
  - Total: 65.8 km^{2} (25.4 sq mi)
- Elevation: 190–900 m (620–2,950 ft)

Population
  - Total: 69 (2021 census)
  - Density: 1.049/km^{2} (2.716/sq mi)
- Time zone: UTC+10:00 (AEST)
- Postcode: 4343
Suburbs around Lefthand Branch
Mount Sylvia	Ingoldsby	Ingoldsby
Woodbine; Junction View	Lefthand Branch	Thornton
East Haldon	East Haldon	Townson

Lefthand Branch is a rural locality in the Lockyer Valley Region, Queensland, Australia. In the 2021 census, Lefthand Branch had a population of 69 people.

== Geography ==
Lefthand Branch is named for the creek, Lefthand Branch creek that runs the length of the valley and the creek is named for the fact that it turns left after splitting from Tent Hill Creek. The narrow valley runs south east for approximately 11 kilometers. It is mainly cattle properties and some small vegetable crop farms, although there are a few olive crops and a small turf farm.

Lefthand Branch has the following mountain features:

- Rocky Peak (27.8283°S 152.2788°E) 837 metres (2,746 ft)
- Laidley Gap, a mountain pass (27.8305°S 152.3156°E)

Main Range National Park extends into the south of the locality.

== History ==
Hillview Provisional School opened on 16 October 1899. On 1 January 1909, it became Hillview State School. In 1914, it was renamed Viewland State School. It closed in 1923, to reopen in 1924 as Left Hand Branch State School, which finally closed in 1967. It was on the western side of Lefthand Branch Road, south of the junction with Reibstein Gully Road (approx 27.76419°S 152.24941°E).

== Demographics ==
In the 2016 census, Lefthand Branch had a population of 79 people.

In the 2021 census, Lefthand Branch had a population of 69 people.

== Education ==
There are no schools in Lefthand Branch. The nearest government primary school is Mount Sylvia State School in neighbouring Mount Sylvia to the north-west. The nearest government secondary school is Lockyer District State High School in Gatton to the north.
