= Caffey, Queensland =

Caffey
- Suburb
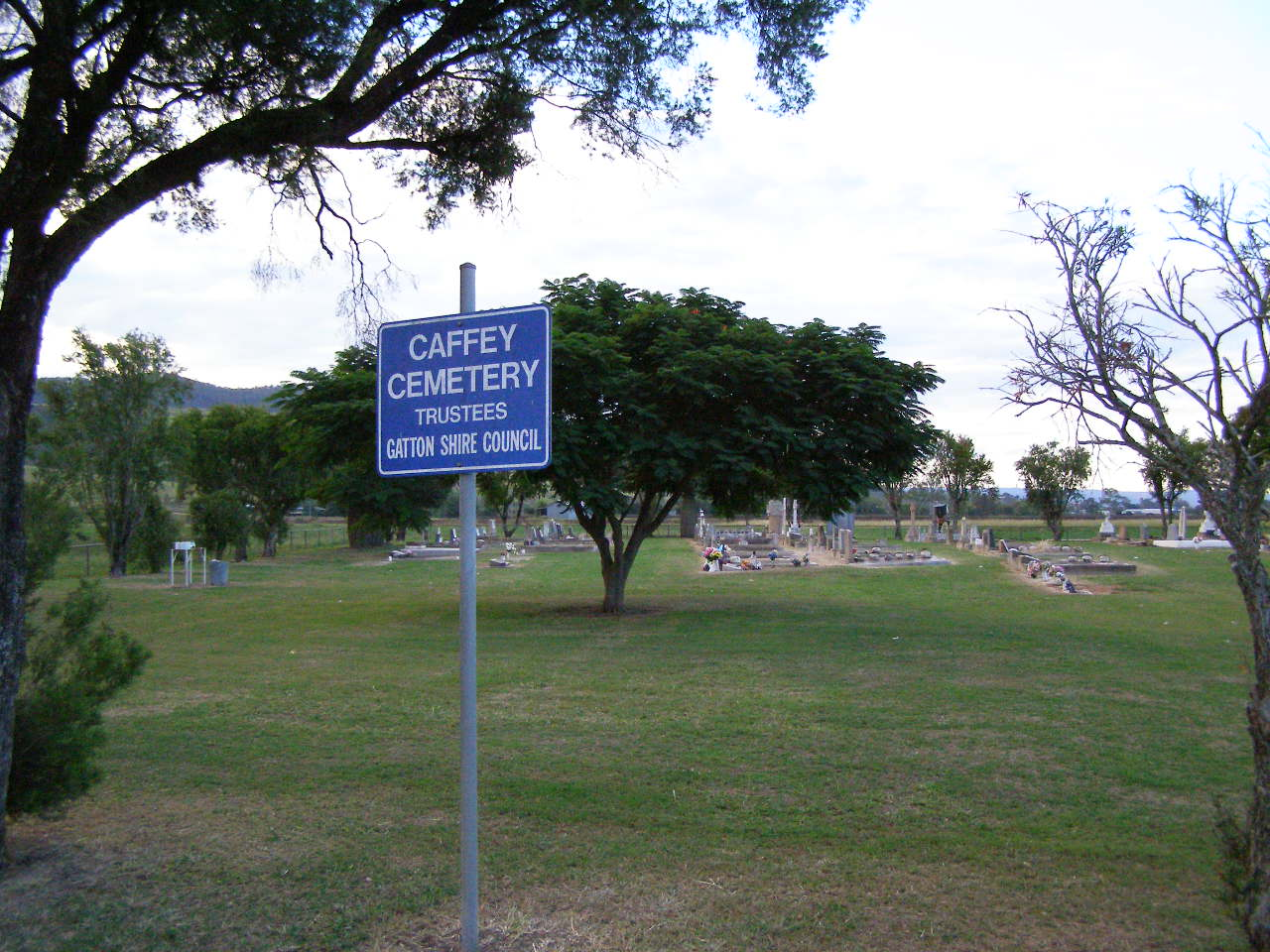
- Caffey Cemetery, 2006

- Interactive map of Caffey
- Coordinates: 27.6969°S 152.2124°E
- Country: Australia
- State: Queensland
- LGA: Lockyer Valley Region
- Location: 19.4 km (12.1 mi) SE of Gatton; 42.9 km (26.7 mi) SE of Toowoomba; 115 km (71 mi) WSW of Brisbane

Government
  - State electorate: Lockyer
  - Federal division: Wright

Area
  - Total: 11.7 km^{2} (4.5 sq mi)

Population
  - Total: 45 (2021 census)
  - Density: 3.85/km^{2} (9.96/sq mi)
- Time zone: UTC+10:00 (AEST)
- Postcode: 4343
Suburbs around Caffey
Upper Tenthill	Upper Tenthill	Upper Tenthill
Mount Whitestone	Caffey	Ingoldsby
Mount Sylvia	Mount Sylvia	Mount Sylvia

Caffey is a rural locality in the Lockyer Valley Region, Queensland, Australia. In the 2021 census, Caffey had a population of 45 people.

== Geography ==
Tenthill Creek forms part of the south-eastern boundary before flowing through to form part of the northern boundary. Wonga Creek forms the north-eastern boundary on its way to join the Tenthill.

== History ==
The name Caffey is believed to have been the name of a pioneer selector in the area.

In August 1927, a public meeting was held with the objective of obtaining a school for the district. In July 1926 the Queensland Government agreed to establish a school. The cost was £759. Caffey State School opened on 26 July 1927. It closed on 12 February 1971. It was on the south-eastern corner of the junction of Tenthill Creek and Mount Sylvia Road (27.6967°S 152.2169°E).

== Demographics ==
In the 2016 census, Caffey had a population of 65 people.

In the 2021 census, Caffey had a population of 45 people.

== Education ==
There are no schools in Caffey. The nearest government primary schools are Mount Sylvia State School in neighbouring Mount Sylvia to the south and Mount Whitestone State School in neighbouring Mount Whitestone to the north-west. The nearest government secondary school is Lockyer District State High School in Gatton to the north-east.

== Facilities ==
Caffey Cemetery is at 977 Mount Sylvia Road (27.6960°S 152.2197°E). It is operated by the Lockyer Valley Regional Council.
