= Lockyer Valley Region =

Coordinates: 27°33′31.8″S 152°16′41.4″E

- Local government area
- Location within South East Queensland

- Interactive map of Lockyer Valley Region
- Country: Australia
- State: Queensland
- Region: West Moreton
- Established: 2008
- Council seat: Gatton

Government
  - Mayor: Tanya Milligan
  - State electorate: Lockyer
  - Federal division: Wright

Area
  - Total: 2,269 km^{2} (876 sq mi)

Population
  - Total: 41,011 (2018)
  - Density: 18.074/km^{2} (46.813/sq mi)
- Website: Lockyer Valley Region
LGAs around Lockyer Valley Region
| Toowoomba | Somerset | Somerset |
| Toowoomba | Lockyer Valley Region | Ipswich |
| Southern Downs | Southern Downs | Scenic Rim |

The Lockyer Valley Region is a local government area (LGA) in the West Moreton region of South East Queensland, Australia. The region is located between the cities of Ipswich and Toowoomba, and is bordered by the Somerset and Southern Downs regions to the north and south, respectively. Lockyer Valley was created in 2008 from a merger of the former shires of Gatton and Laidley. The Lockyer Valley Regional Council has an estimated operating budget of A$35m.

The region is named after the British soldier and explorer Major Edmund Lockyer (1784–1860) who surveyed the Brisbane River for approximately 150 miles on the instructions of the Governor of the Colony of New South Wales, Sir Thomas Brisbane.

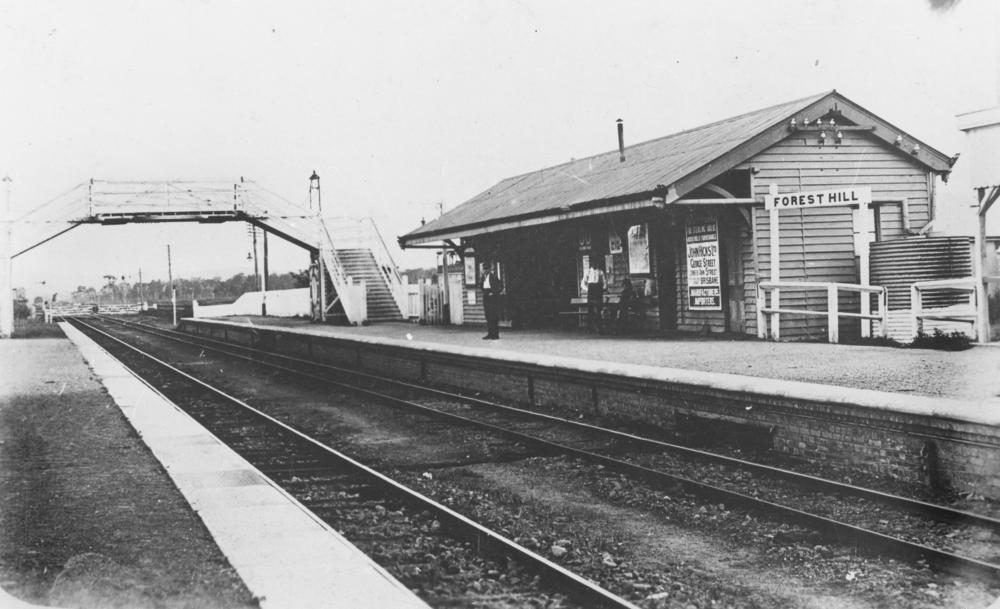
Forest Hill railway station, 1914

Prior to European settlement, the Lockyer Valley region was home to the Kitabul Aboriginal people.

Tarampa Division, as it was then known, was created on 15 January 1880 under the Divisional Boards Act 1879, with its first board meeting being held on 20 February 1880. On 25 April 1888, the Laidley district broke away and separately incorporated as the Laidley Division, and later on 25 January 1890, the Forest Hill area moved from Tarampa to Laidley. On 1 July 1902, the town of Laidley was created as a separate municipality with its own Borough Council.

With the passage of the Local Authorities Act 1902, the borough and divisions became a town and shires respectively on 31 March 1903. The town council was dissolved on 8 February 1917, and Laidley absorbed parts of other shires to become the Shire of Laidley.

On 3 September 1938, Tarampa was renamed the Shire of Gatton. On 19 March 1949, it grew to incorporate parts of the former Shires of Drayton and Highfields, while losing some of its original area to the City of Toowoomba and Shire of Crows Nest.

In July 2007, the Local Government Reform Commission released its report and recommended that Gatton and Laidley amalgamate, uniting the major farming, cropping and horticultural production area of South East Queensland under one local authority. While both councils opposed the amalgamation, they identified each other as preferred partners if it had to go ahead. On 15 March 2008, the two Shires formally ceased to exist, and elections were held on the same day to elect six councillors and a mayor to the Lockyer Valley Regional Council.

After the deadly 2010–11 Queensland floods, which destroyed the town of Grantham, the council responded quickly to relocate the town to non-flood prone land. The council purchased freehold land adjoining the existing town for the voluntary resettlement of eligible residents.

The council has also responded to floods by installing a network of cameras around the region which can be viewed by members of the public on a web page.

== Towns and localities ==
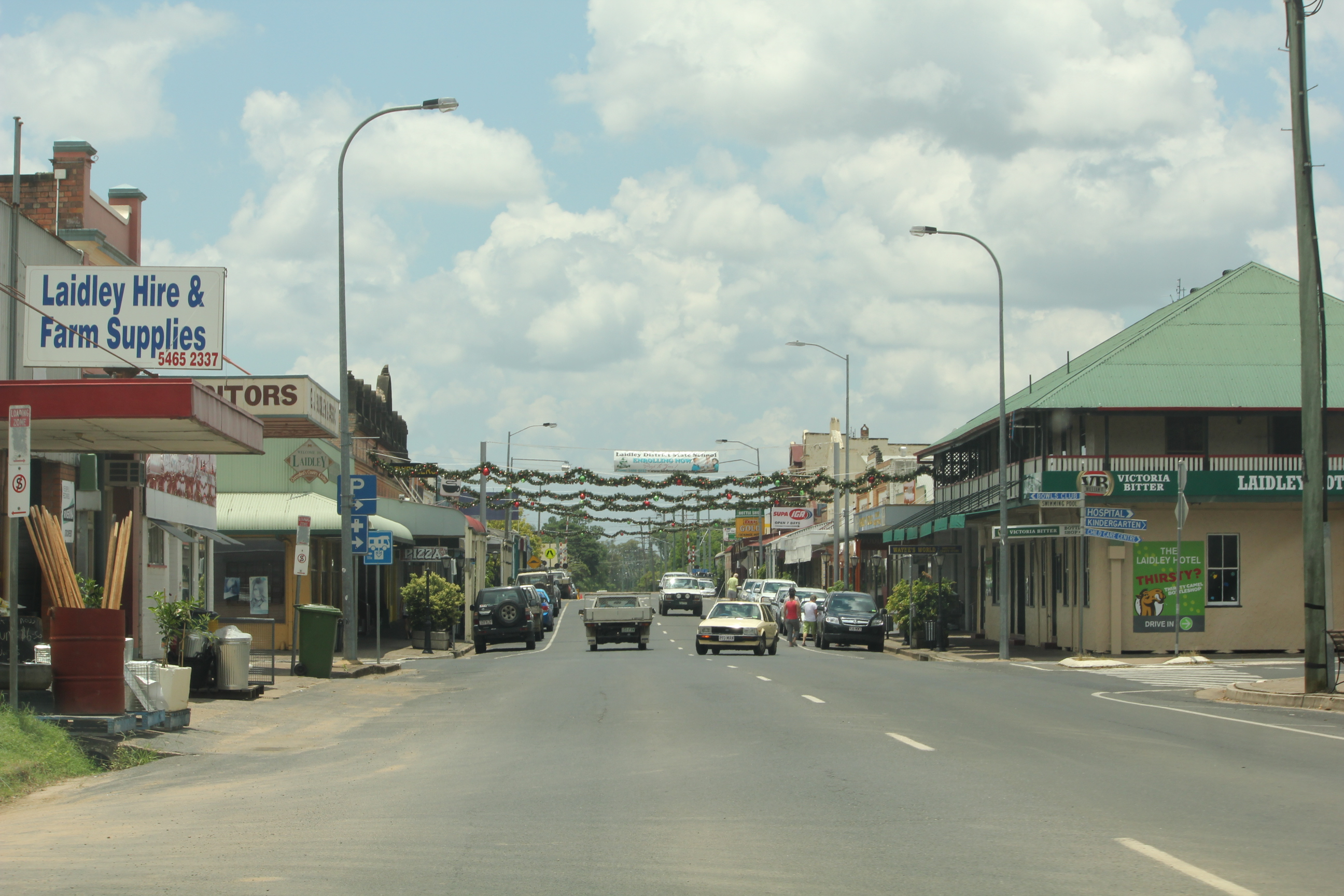
The main street of Laidley, 2011

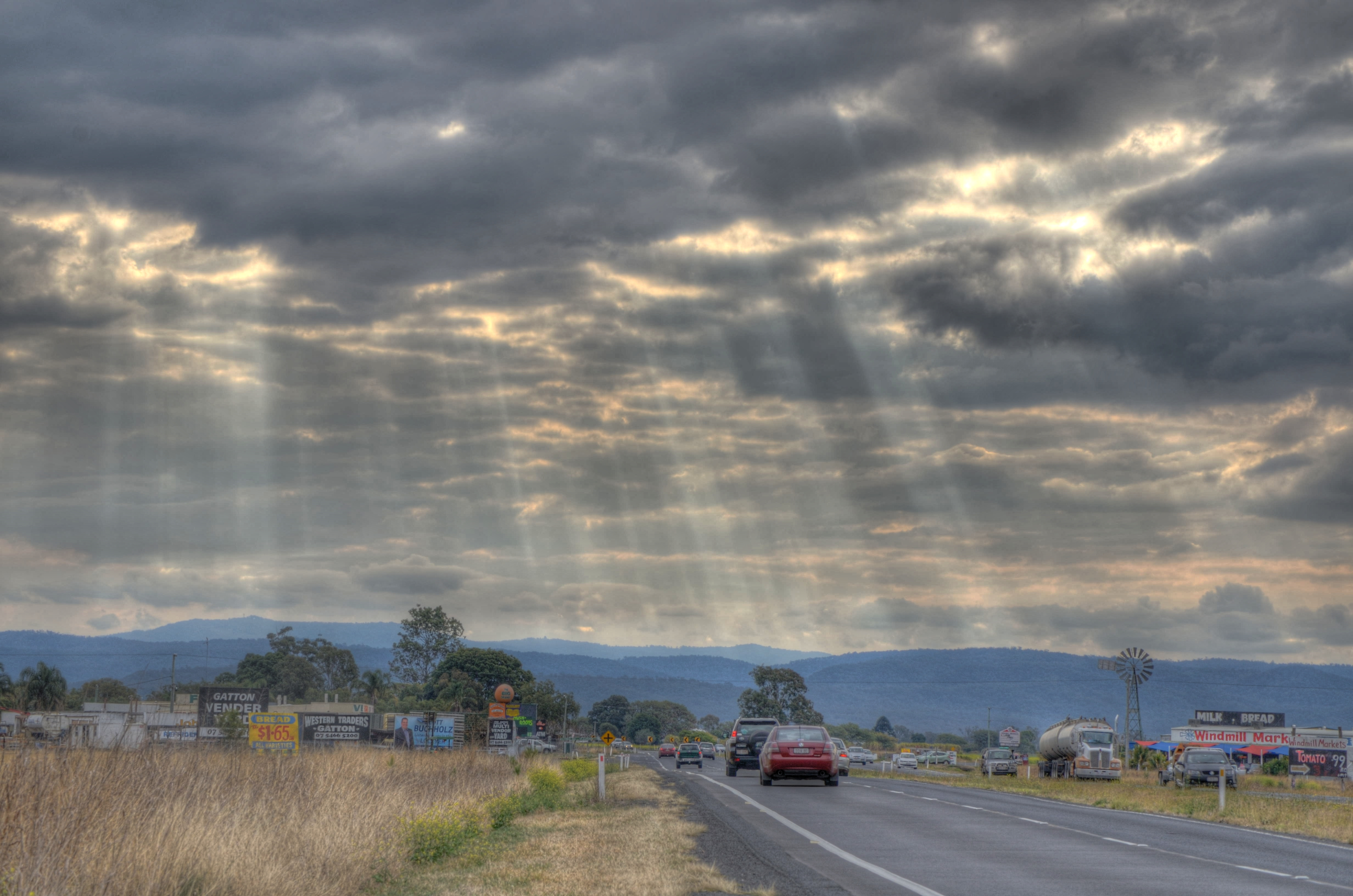
Warrego Highway looking towards Toowoomba

The Lockyer Valley Region includes the following settlements:

Gatton area:

- Gatton
- Adare
- Blanchview
- Caffey
- Carpendale
- College View
- Flagstone Creek
- Fordsdale
- Grantham
- Helidon
- Ingoldsby
- Iredale
- Junction View
- Lake Clarendon
- Lawes
- Lower Tenthill
- Ma Ma Creek
- Mount Sylvia
- Mount Whitestone
- Murphys Creek
- Postmans Ridge
- Placid Hills
- Ropeley
- Thornton
- Upper Tenthill
- Veradilla
- Winwill
- Withcott
- Woodlands

Laidley area:

- Laidley
- Blenheim
- Forest Hill
- Glenore Grove
- Regency Downs
- Hatton Vale
- Kentville
- Laidley Heights
- Lockrose
- Mulgowie
- Plainland

Other areas:

- Ballard
- Black Duck Creek
- Brightview (Note: Locality is split with Somerset Region.)
- Buaraba South
- Churchable
- Crowley Vale
- Derrymore
- East Haldon
- Egypt
- Fifteen Mile
- Glen Cairn
- Helidon Spa
- Kensington Grove
- Laidley Creek West
- Laidley North
- Laidley South
- Lefthand Branch
- Lilydale
- Lockyer
- Lockyer Waters
- Lynford
- Morton Vale
- Mount Berryman
- Preston
- Ringwood
- Rockmount
- Rockside
- Seventeen Mile
- Silver Ridge
- Spring Creek
- Stockyard
- Summerholm
- Townson
- Upper Flagstone
- Upper Lockyer
- Vinegar Hill
- West Haldon
- White Mountain
- Woodbine

== Population ==
Prior to 2008, the populations given relate to the previous component entities. The 2011 census marks the first for the region to be recorded as a single area.

| Year | Population (Region total) | Population (Gatton) | Population (Laidley) |
|---|---|---|---|
| 1933 | 11,153 | 6,053 | 5,100 |
| 1947 | 11,158 | 6,403 | 4,755 |
| 1954 | 11,754 | 7,137 | 4,617 |
| 1961 | 12,387 | 7,594 | 4,793 |
| 1966 | 12,661 | 7,814 | 4,847 |
| 1971 | 12,592 | 8,099 | 4,493 |
| 1976 | 13,324 | 8,689 | 4,635 |
| 1981 | 15,055 | 9,675 | 5,380 |
| 1986 | 18,546 | 11,734 | 6,812 |
| 1991 | 22,273 | 13,810 | 8,463 |
| 1996 | 26,846 | 14,730 | 12,116 |
| 2001 | 27,561 | 14,925 | 12,636 |
| 2006 | 29,883 | 15,572 | 14,311 |

Population of Lockyer Valley Region
| Year | Population | Notes |
|---|---|---|
| 2011 | 34,954 | |
| 2016 | 38,609 | |
| 2021 | 41,101 | |

== Council ==
The Lockyer Valley Regional Council remains undivided and its elected body consists of six councillors and a popularly elected mayor, elected for a four-year term. A deputy mayor is also appointed by council for a four-year term.

=== Current composition ===
The current council, elected in 2024, is:

| Position | Councillor | Party |
|---|---|---|
| Mayor | Tanya Milligan | N/A |
| Councillor | Chris Wilson | N/A |
| Councillor | Michael Hagan | N/A |
| Councillor | David Neuendorf | N/A |
| Councillor | Julie Reck | N/A |
| Councillor | Cheryl Steinhardt | N/A |
| Councillor | Anthony Wilson | N/A |

== Mayors ==
Steve Jones, former mayor of Gatton, was elected as first mayor of the Lockyer Valley Region. He died in office on 19 February 2016. Deputy mayor Tanya Milligan was acting mayor until she was elected as mayor in her own right on 16 April 2016.

=== 2008−present ===
| No. | Portrait | Mayor | Party | Term start | Term end | Council control (term) |
|---|---|---|---|---|---|---|
| 1 | | Steve Jones | Independent | 15 March 2008 | 19 February 2016 † | Independents majority (2008–present) |
| − | | Tanya Milligan | Independent | 19 February 2016 | 16 April 2012 | Independents majority (2008–present) |
| 2 | | Tanya Milligan | Independent | 16 April 2012 | incumbent | Independents majority (2008–present) |

=== Deputy mayors ===
| No. | Portrait | Mayor | Party | Term start | Term end | Mayor |
|---|---|---|---|---|---|---|
| | | Tanya Milligan | Independent | 2012 | 19 February 2016 | Jones (Independent) |
| | | Jason Cook | Independent | 2016 | incumbent | Milligan (Independent) |

== Past councillors ==
=== 2008−present ===
| Year | Councillor | Party | Councillor | Party | Councillor | Party | Councillor | Party | Councillor | Party | Councillor | Party |
|---|---|---|---|---|---|---|---|---|---|---|---|---|
| 2008 | Peter Friend | Independent | Janice Holstein | Independent | Jim McDonald | Independent LNP | Tanya Milligan | Independent | Graham Moon | Independent | Dave Neuendorf | Independent |
| 2012a | Peter Friend | Independent | Janice Holstein | Independent | Jim McDonald | Independent LNP | Tanya Milligan | Independent | Graham Moon | Independent | Dave Neuendorf | Katter's Australian |
| 2012b | Peter Friend | Independent | Janice Holstein | Independent | Jim McDonald | Independent LNP | Tanya Milligan | Independent | Graham Moon | Independent | Vacant | |
| 2012 | Peter Friend | Independent | Janice Holstein | Independent | Jim McDonald | Independent LNP | Tanya Milligan | Independent | Kathy McLean | Independent | Derek Pingel | Independent |
| 2016 | Jason Cook | Independent | Janice Holstein | Independent | Jim McDonald | Independent LNP | Michael Hagan | Independent | Kathy McLean | Independent | Chris Wilson | Independent |
| 2018 | Jason Cook | Independent | Janice Holstein | Independent | Rick Vela | Independent | Michael Hagan | Independent | Kathy McLean | Independent | Chris Wilson | Independent |
| 2020 | Jason Cook | Independent | Janice Holstein | Independent | Rick Vela | Independent | Michael Hagan | Independent | Brett Qualischefski | Independent LNP | Chris Wilson | Independent |
| 2024 | Jason Cook | Independent | Janice Holstein | Independent | Rick Vela | Independent | Michael Hagan | Independent | Brett Qualischefski | Independent LNP | Chris Wilson | A Better Lockyer |

== Libraries ==
The Lockyer Valley Region Council provide public libraries in Gatton and Laidley.

== Sister City Relations ==
- Ageo, Japan, since July 2014
