= Thornton, Queensland =

Thornton
- Suburb
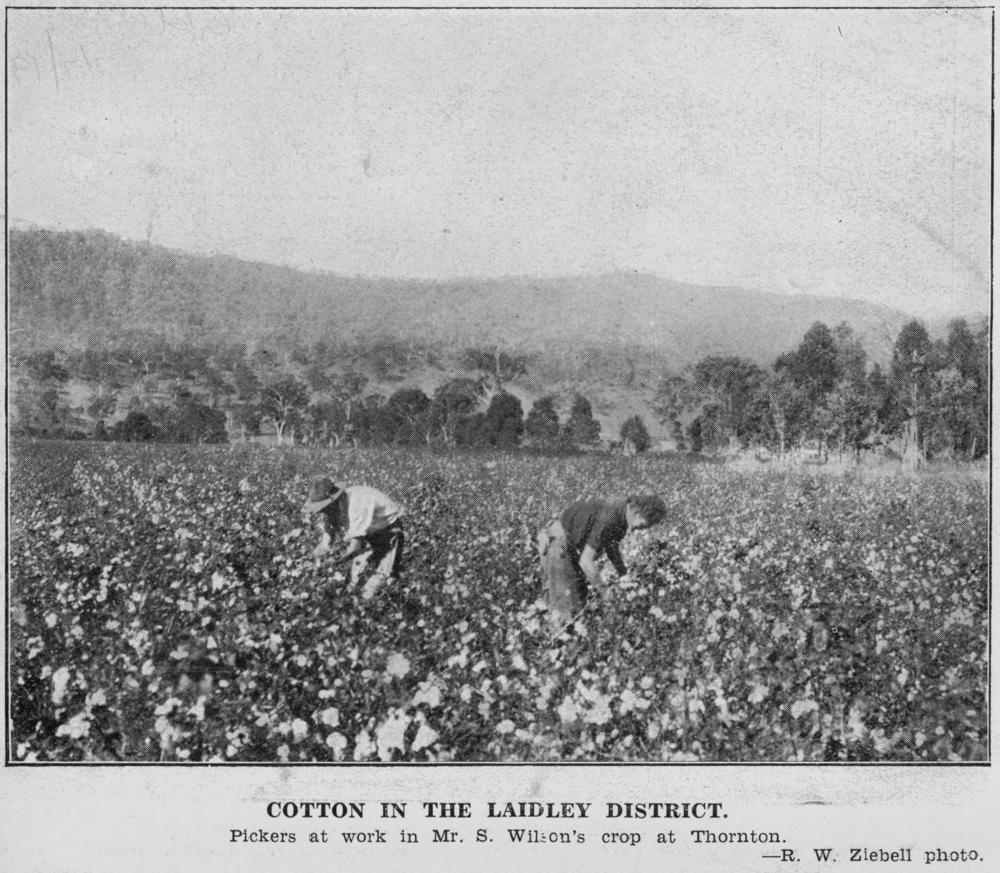
- Picking cotton at Thornton, 1931

- Interactive map of Thornton
- Coordinates: 27.7991°S 152.3525°E
- Country: Australia
- State: Queensland
- LGA: Lockyer Valley Region
- Location: 24.7 km (15.3 mi) SSW of Laidley; 40.2 km (25.0 mi) SSE of Gatton; 66.6 km (41.4 mi) SW of Ipswich; 78.8 km (49.0 mi) SE of Toowoomba; 106 km (66 mi) WSW of Brisbane

Government
  - State electorate: Lockyer
  - Federal divisions: Wright; Blair

Area
  - Total: 94.6 km^{2} (36.5 sq mi)

Population
  - Total: 214 (2021 census)
  - Density: 2.262/km^{2} (5.859/sq mi)
- Time zone: UTC+10:00 (AEST)
- Postcode: 4341
Suburbs around Thornton
Ingoldsby	Mount Berryman	Mulgowie
Lefthand Branch	Thornton	Mount Mort
Lefthand Branch	Townson	Mount Mort

Thornton is a rural locality in the Lockyer Valley Region, Queensland, Australia. In the 2021 census, Thornton had a population of 214 people.

== Geography ==
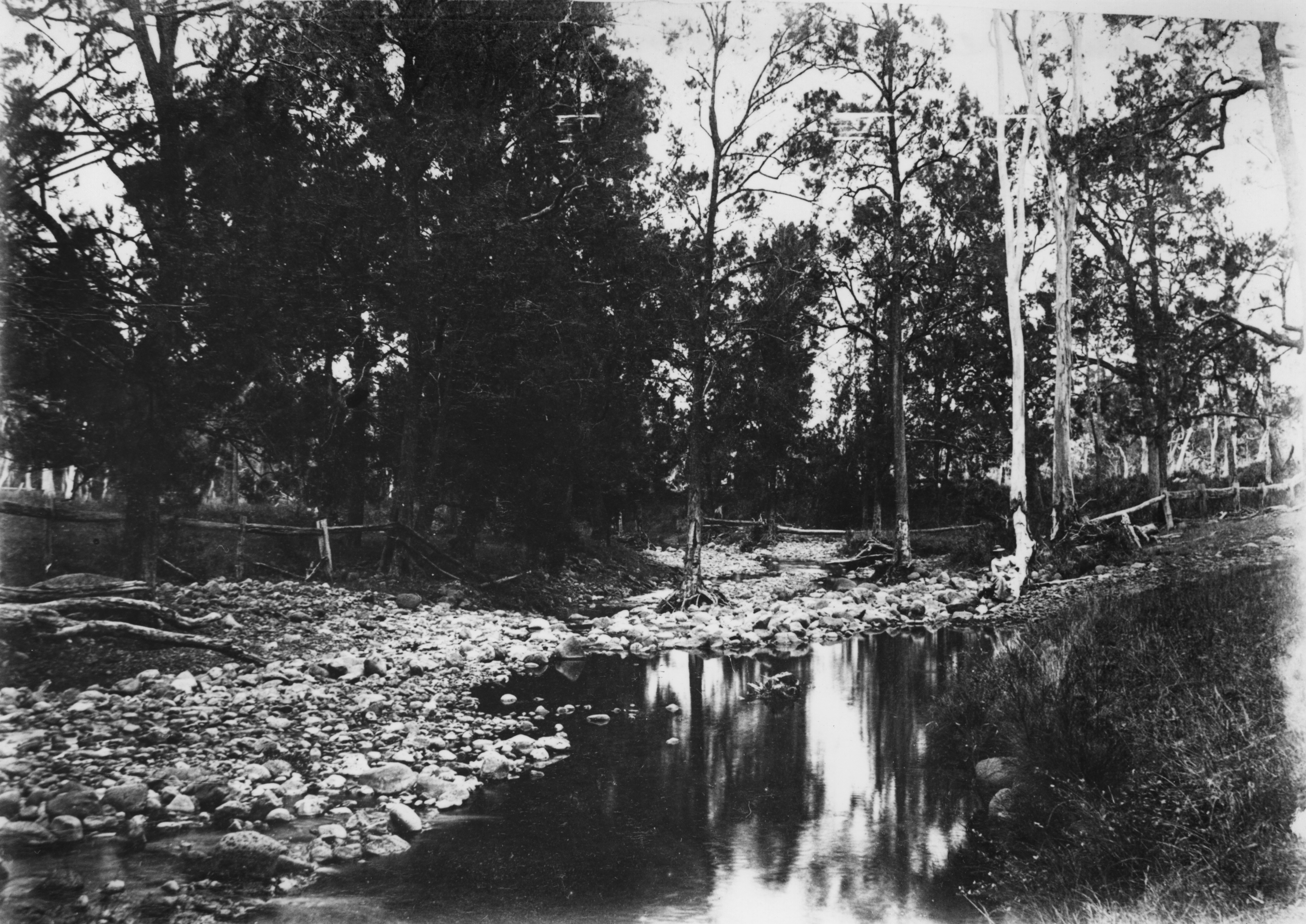
Main Camp Creek, Thornton, circa 1891

Thornton is a mountainous area. It is bounded to the west by the ridge of the Mistake Mountains range and to the east by the ridge of the Little Liverpool Range. Laidley Creek passes through the valley from south to north between the two mountain ranges.

Mount Zahel is in the south-west of the locality (27.8097°S 152.3274°E) near the Mistake Mountains. It is 880 metres (2,890 ft) above sea level. Mount Cooper is in the north of the location (27.7791°S 152.34°E). It is 880 metres (2,890 ft) above sea level. Laidley Gap is a pass through the Mistake Mountains (27.8320°S 152.3156°E). The name is derived from Laidley Plain, which was named on 22 June 1829 after James Laidley by explorer Allan Cunningham.

Mount Beau Brummell is in the east of the locality (27.8042°S 152.3989°E) within the Little Liverpool Range. It is 718 metres (2,356 ft) above sea level. Edwards Gap is a pass through the Little Liverpool Range (27.7695°S 152.3890°E)

The land use is mostly grazing on native vegetation with irrigated crop growing along Laidley Creek.

== History ==
Thornton Provisional School opened on 11 October 1881 by its first principal W.J. Mitchell. It became Thornton State School on 1 April 1890.

Thornton Primitive Methodist Church opened on 24 May 1885. It was built on 0.5 acres (0.20 ha) of land donated by Mr W.H. Hodges. In October 1952, memorial gates were dedicated to Joseph Cook who died on active service, a tribute from his mother Mrs Eliza Cook and the church trustees.

St George's Anglican Church was dedicated on Thursday 8 February 1906 by Archdeacon Arthur Rivers. The church was an ornate wooden building, 30 by 20 feet (9.1 by 6.1 m). Its closure on 3 May 2005 was approved by Assistant Bishop Rob Nolan.

== Demographics ==
In the 2016 census, Thornton had a population of 201 people.

In the 2021 census, Thornton had a population of 214 people.

== Education ==
Thornton State School is a government primary (Prep–6) school for boys and girls at 4 Thornton School Road (27.7982°S 152.3720°E). In 2016, the school had an enrolment of 22 students with 3 teachers (2 full-time equivalent) and 5 non-teaching staff (2 full-time equivalent). In 2018, the school had an enrolment of 35 students with 4 teachers (2 full-time equivalent) and 5 non-teaching staff (3 full-time equivalent).

There are no secondary schools in Thornton. The nearest government secondary school is Laidley State High School in Laidley to the north.
