= Mount Sylvia, Queensland =

Mount Sylvia
- Suburb
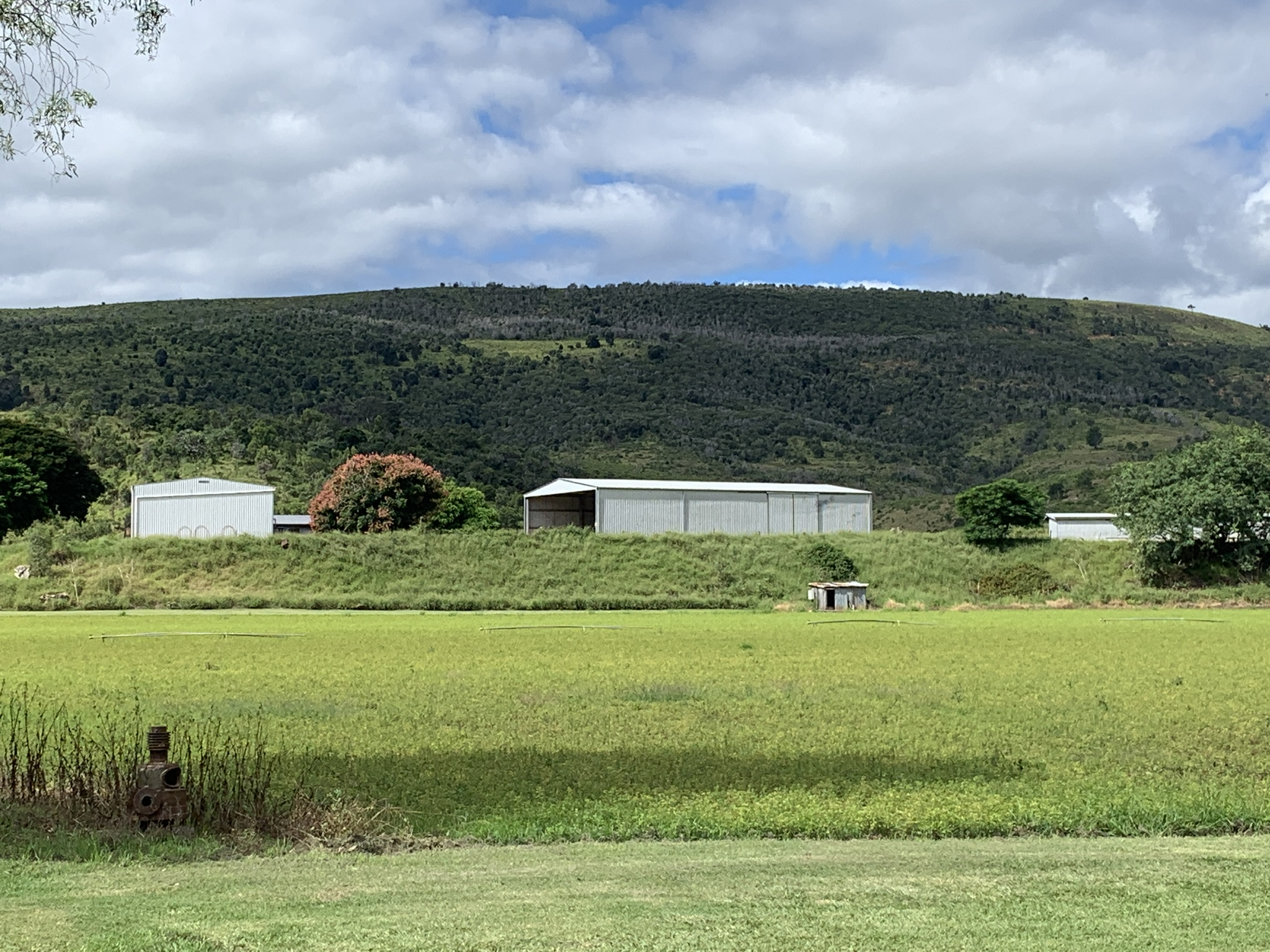
- Mount Sylvia landscape, 2022

- Interactive map of Mount Sylvia
- Coordinates: 27.7380°S 152.2263°E
- Country: Australia
- State: Queensland
- LGA: Lockyer Valley Region
- Location: 22.1 km (13.7 mi) SSE of Gatton; 46.4 km (28.8 mi) SE of Toowoomba; 115 km (71 mi) WSW of Brisbane

Government
  - State electorate: Lockyer
  - Federal division: Wright

Area
  - Total: 41.1 km^{2} (15.9 sq mi)

Population
  - Total: 70 (2021 census)
  - Density: 1.70/km^{2} (4.4/sq mi)
- Time zone: UTC+10:00 (AEST)
- Postcode: 4343
Suburbs around Mount Sylvia
Mount Whitestone	Caffey	Ingoldsby
Mount Whitestone	Mount Sylvia	Lefthand Branch
West Haldon	Woodbine	Lefthand Branch

Mount Sylvia is a rural locality in the Lockyer Valley Region, Queensland, Australia. In the 2021 census, Mount Sylvia had a population of 70 people.

== History ==
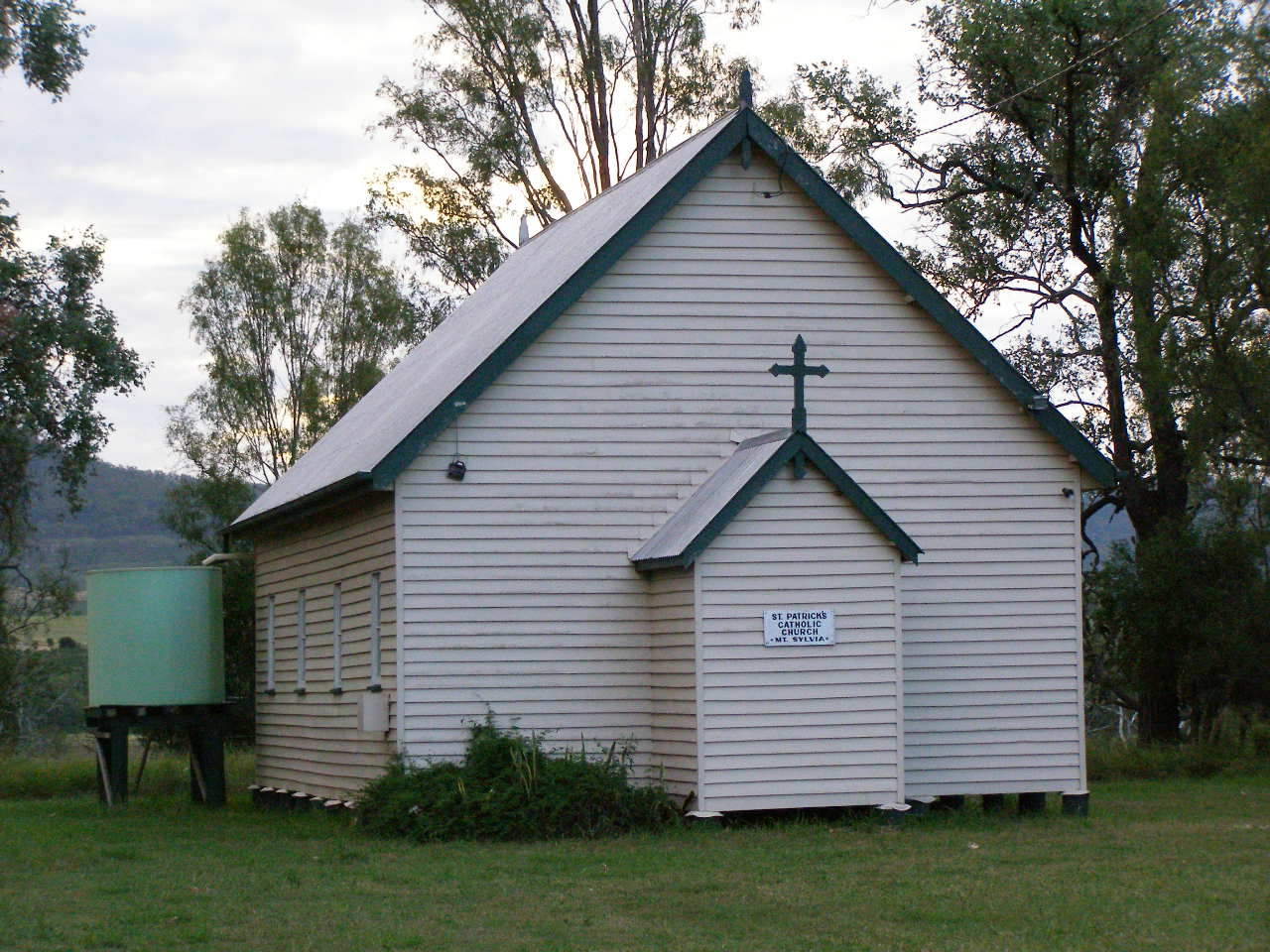
St Patrick's Catholic Church, 2006

Mount Sylvia Provisional School opened on 13 April 1885, becoming Mount Sylvia State School on 1 January 1909.

St Patrick's Catholic Church opened in 1897. It has subsequently closed. It was at 1304 Mount Sylvia Road.

Cross Lutheran Church opened on Sunday 26 March 1905.

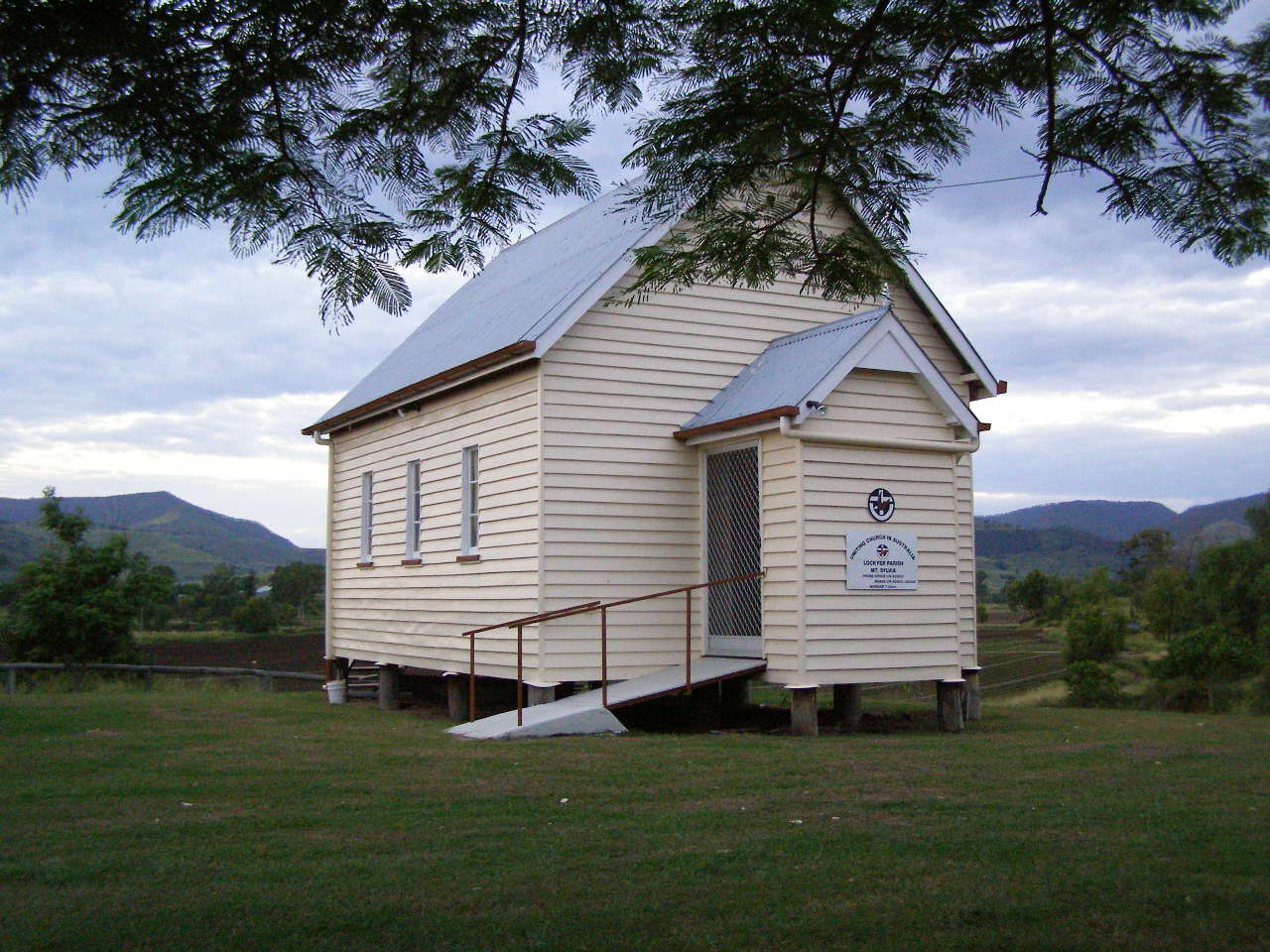
Mount Sylvia Uniting Church (formerly Congregational Church), 2006

Mount Sylvia Congregational Church opened in 1909. In 1977 when the Uniting Church in Australia was established through amalgamation of the Methodist, Presbyterian and Congregational Churches, it became Mount Sylvia Uniting Church. It was at 387 Back Mount Sylvia Road (27.7214°S 152.2195°E). It has closed and was sold on 17 February 2022 for $89,000.

== Demographics ==
In the 2016 census, Mount Sylvia had a population of 106 people.

In the 2021 census, Mount Sylvia had a population of 70 people.

== Heritage listings ==
Mount Sylvia has a number of heritage-listed sites, including:

- Mount Sylvia State School, 6 Left Hand Branch Road (27.7233°S 152.2237°E)

== Education ==
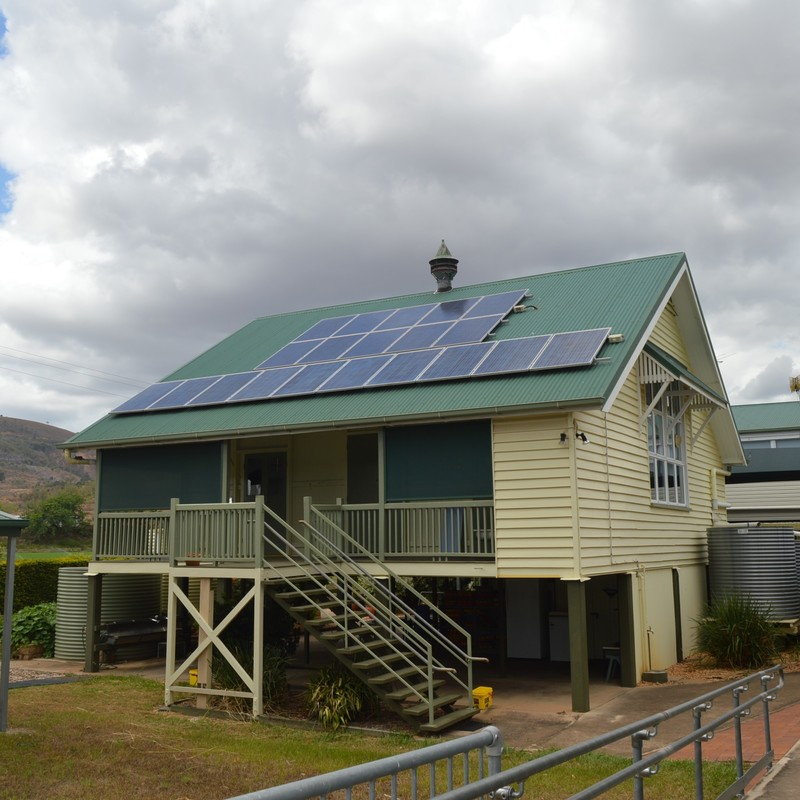
Mount Sylvia State School, 2019

Mount Sylvia State School is a government primary (Prep–6) school for boys and girls at 6 Left Hand Branch Road (27.7230°S 152.2240°E). In 2016, the school had an enrolment of 46 students with 4 teachers (2 full-time equivalent) and 4 non-teaching staff (2 full-time equivalent). In 2018, the school had an enrolment of 26 students with 4 teachers (2 full-time equivalent) and 4 non-teaching staff (2 full-time equivalent).

There are no secondary schools in Mount Sylvia, The nearest government secondary school is Lockyer District State High School in Gatton to the north.

== Amenities ==
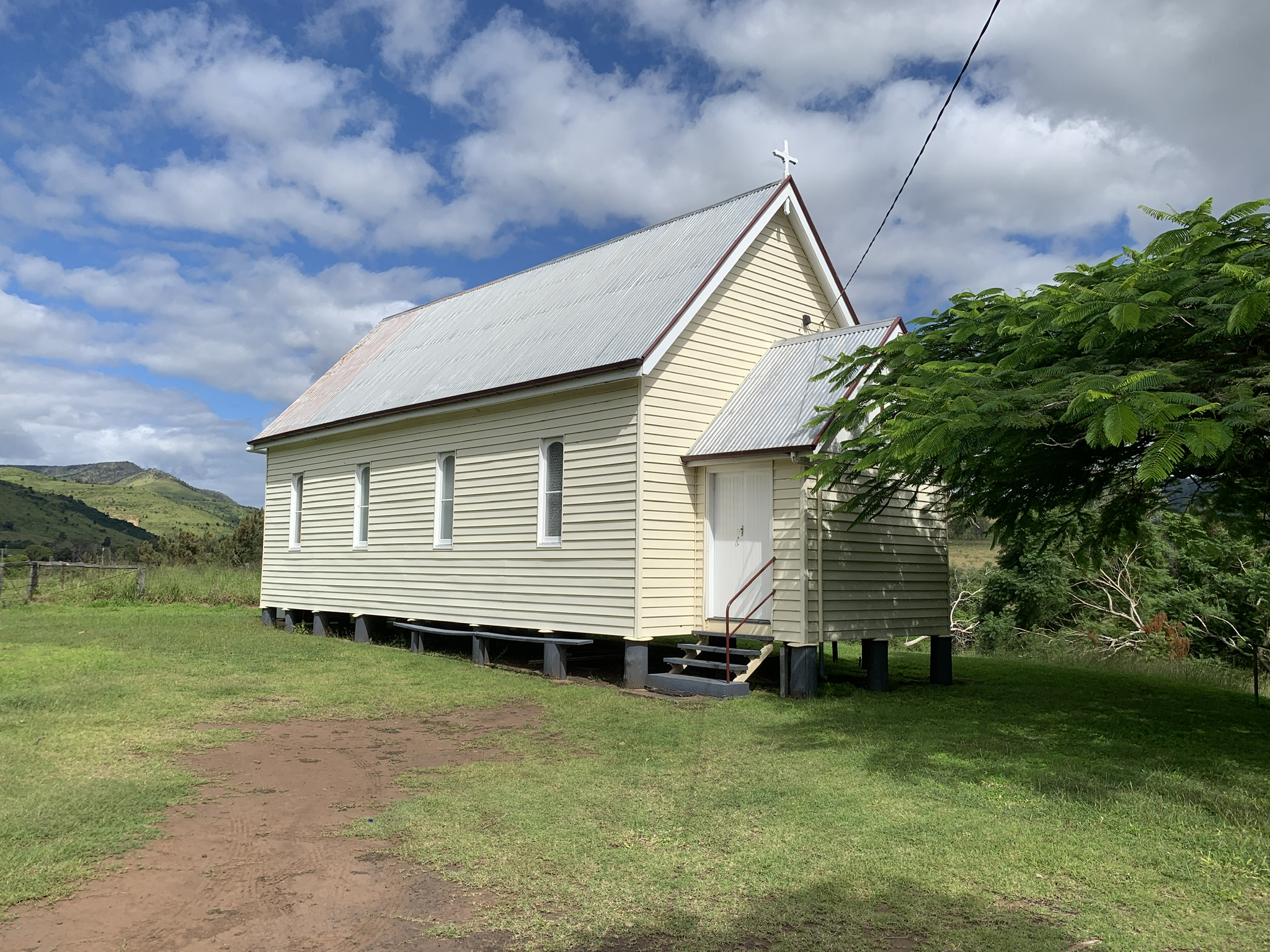
Cross Lutheran Church, 2022

Cross Lutheran Church is at 143 Left Hand Branch Road (27.7320°S 152.2324°E).
