= Mount Sylvia State School =

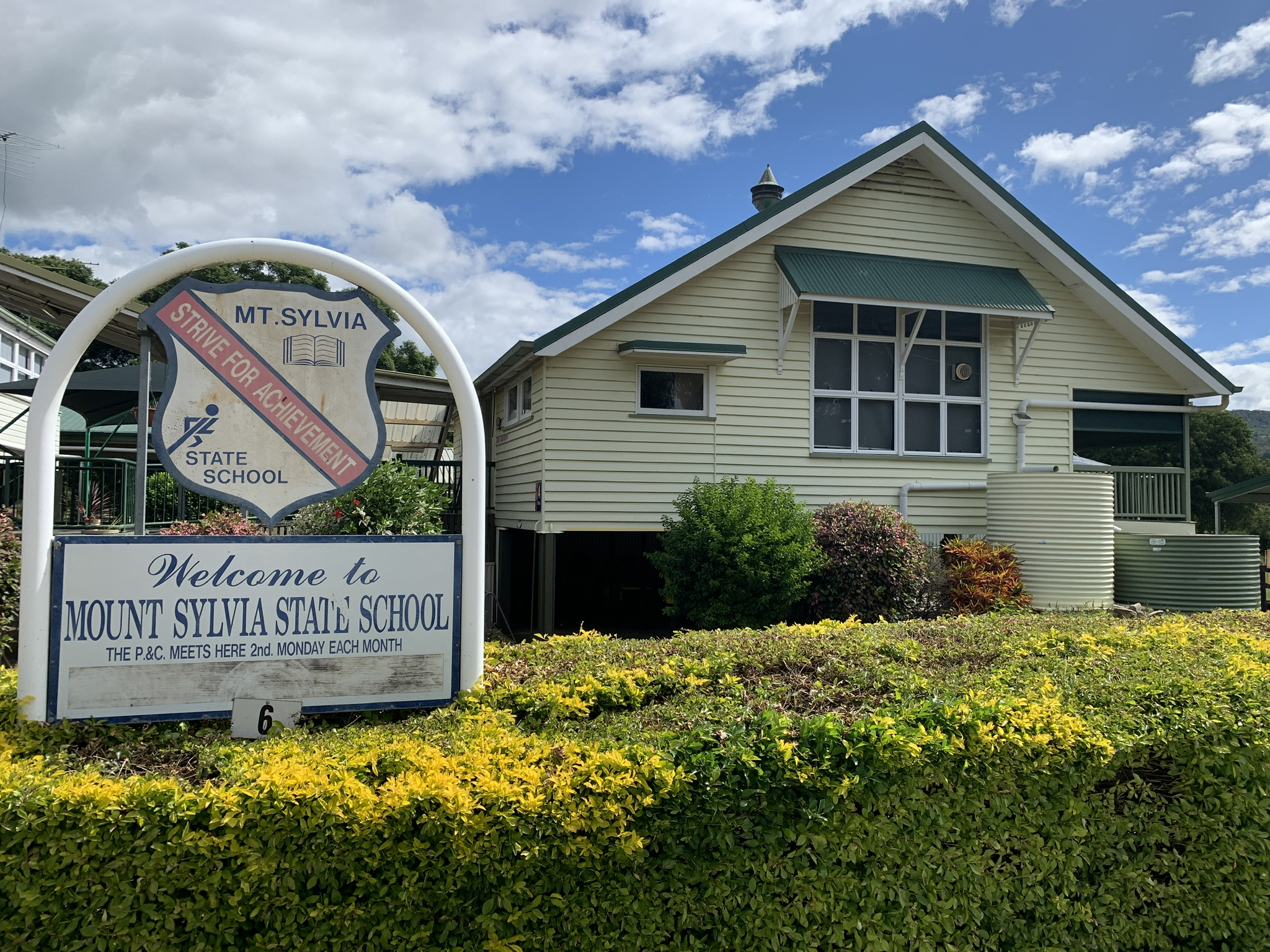
- Mount Sylvia State School, 2022

- Location within Queensland
- 27.7233°S 152.2237°E
- Location: 6 Left Hand Branch Road, Mount Sylvia, Lockyer Valley Region, Queensland, Australia

History
- Design period: 1900–1914 (Early 20th century)
- Built: 1912

Site notes
- Architect: Department of Public Works (Queensland)

Queensland Heritage Register
- Official name: Mount Sylvia State School; Mt Sylvia State School
- Type: state heritage
- Designated: 28 February 2020
- Reference no.: 650247
- Type: Education, research, scientific facility: School-state
- Theme: Educating Queenslanders: Providing primary schooling
- Builders: Department of Public Works

Mount Sylvia State School is a heritage-listed state school at 6 Left Hand Branch Road, Mount Sylvia, Lockyer Valley Region, Queensland, Australia. It was designed by Department of Public Works (Queensland) and built in 1912 by Department of Public Works. It was added to the Queensland Heritage Register on 28 February 2020.

== History ==
Mount Sylvia State School was established in 1885 as the Blackfellow Creek Provisional School. Situated approximately 20 km south of Gatton in the Lockyer Valley, the school retains a good example of a standard design timber school building (Block A, 1912). The school is surrounded by open farmland, bordered by two creeks, Blackfellow Creek and Tenthill Creek, and within its generous grounds are several mature trees, including a row of jacaranda trees. The school has been in continuous operation since its establishment and has been a focus for the local community as a place of important social and cultural activity.

Mount Sylvia forms part of the traditional land of the Yuggera Ugarapul people. The Lockyer Valley was first explored by Europeans in the late 1820s. Pastoral runs were established in the Darling Downs in the 1840s with the Lockyer Valley following closely. The Tent Hill run initially covered an area of approximately 30,000 acres (12,140ha) and included the district now known as Mount Sylvia. With the government's introduction of the Alienation of Crown Lands Act 1868, to encourage smaller-scale farming, Tent Hill run was partially opened for closer settlement. Selections along Blackfellow Creek were swiftly taken up, largely by German immigrants, and by the late 1870s, the Mount Sylvia district had become one of the most productive agricultural areas in the Lockyer Valley.

The provision of state-administered education was important to the colonial governments of Australia. National schools, established in 1848 in New South Wales, were continued in Queensland following the separation of Queensland in 1859. Following the introduction of the Education Act 1860, which established the Board of General Education and began standardising curriculum, training and facilities, Queensland's national and public schools grew from four in 1860 to 230 by 1875. The State Education Act 1875 provided for free, compulsory and secular primary education and established the Department of Public Instruction. This further standardised the provision of education, and despite difficulties, achieved the remarkable feat of bringing basic literacy to most Queensland children by 1900.

The establishment of schools was considered an essential step in the development of new communities and integral to their success. Locals often donated land and labour for a school's construction and the school community contributed to maintenance and development. Schools became a community focus, a symbol of progress, and a source of pride, with enduring connections formed with past pupils, parents, and teachers.

In 1884, residents of Mount Sylvia's small farming community lobbied the Department of Public Instruction (the department) for the establishment of a provisional school. Provisional schools were seen as a convenient means of providing an elementary education throughout the colony and soon became an integral part of the educational landscape. A provisional school could be opened with as few as 15 (later 12) pupils. The Board of General Education gave financial assistance to local committees to set up and maintain these schools. The local committee provided a building (often slab and shingle) and found a teacher, and the Board paid the teacher's salary relative to the number of pupils.

The two closest schools to Mount Sylvia were more than five miles (8 km) away, a considerable distance for children to travel each day. One acre (0.4ha) of land with Left Hand Branch Road frontage and situated above the confluence of Blackfellow and Tenthill creeks, was donated to the community, and with the approval of the department, the first timber teaching building was constructed by the Mount Sylvia community. The modest school was opened in April 1885 with an enrolment of 33 students.

When first opened, the school was named Blackfellow Creek Provisional School. The name was changed to Mount Sylvia, however, as it was thought it may cause confusion with the two other schools previously established along Blackfellow Creek. It is believed the name was derived from the Queen of Romania's nom-de-plume, Carmen Sylva. At the time, two of the school committee members were reading one of her books, and proposed the school name be changed to "Mount Sylvia school", with the surrounding district subsequently becoming known as Mount Sylvia.

This school served the community well for the next ten years. However, as further land was made available for selection and more farms established in the district, the school's enrolments increased and it soon became overcrowded. The department recognised this and in March 1894 tenders were called for the construction of a new school building for Mount Sylvia. Following a visit to the newly completed school in April 1894, the district school inspector reported that the "new building measures 24 ft by 14 ft with a 7 ft verandah in front" and, with the inclusion of a tank and stand, had a total cost of £50. Following the completion of the new teaching building, the old building was shifted on the site and modified to become the teacher's residence. The original teaching building faced west and overlooked the creek.

Due to the rudimentary state of the first teacher's residence, a new residence was constructed in 1902, built at right angles to and behind the 1894 teaching building. The four-roomed house with front verandah faced north and had a semi-detached kitchen behind. In 1909, additions to the rear of the residence were made by the department.

As early as 1898, the Mount Sylvia community was eager to have the provisional school upgraded to state school status. Enrolments had reached 80 students and overcrowding had become an issue. In 1894, there were 55 farmers listed in the postal records at Mount Sylvia, and by 1913, there were 68.

As districts developed, the department would generally raise provisional schools to state school status, with purpose-designed school buildings and teacher's residences attracting better qualified and more experienced teachers. In 1909, by lowering the required minimum average number of pupils for a state school from 30 to 12, the department upgraded the majority of provisional schools to state school status, gradually providing these schools with new standard buildings designed and constructed to government standards.

Initially, the department was reluctant to grant this to Mount Sylvia, as the portion of land on which the school stood was too small for the department's minimal standard size for a state school. In 1911, the school inspector reported that the current site of the school was a precarious one, as Blackfellow Creek increasingly encroached upon the school's land following floods, and had eroded the steep embankment. It was recommended that an adjoining 3 acre (1.2ha) lot fronting the road to Gatton (known as Mt Sylvia Road in 2019) be acquired by the department at a cost of £30 per acre. The department approved this and tenders were called in September 1911 for the construction of a new teaching building at Mount Sylvia.

The builder awarded the contract was Gatton builder, RGC Hamwoods, at a cost of £425. A builders' strike delayed construction work. In March 1912, Hamwoods wrote to the department informing them of the difficulty finding willing hands, "I will admit the timber has been ready for some time but during the time of the late strike I could not get any men to go out into the country, nor can I get them to go yet". Regardless of these setbacks, work progressed and the new teaching building had been completed by the end of September that year.

To help ensure consistency and economy, the Queensland Government developed standard plans for its school buildings. From the 1860s until the 1960s, Queensland school buildings were predominantly timber-framed, an easy and cost-effective approach that also enabled the government to provide facilities in remote areas. Standard designs were continually refined in response to changing needs and educational philosophy and Queensland school buildings were particularly innovative in climate control, lighting, and ventilation. Standardisation produced distinctly similar schools across Queensland with complexes of typical components.

In c. 1909 high-set timber buildings were introduced, providing better ventilation as well as further teaching space and a covered play area underneath. This was a noticeable new direction and this form became a characteristic of Queensland schools. A technical innovation developed at this time was a continuous ventilation flap on the wall at floor level. This hinged board could be opened to increase air flow into the space and, combined with a ceiling vent and large roof fleche, improved internal air quality and decreased internal temperatures effectively. This type was introduced around 1909 and was constructed until approximately 1920.

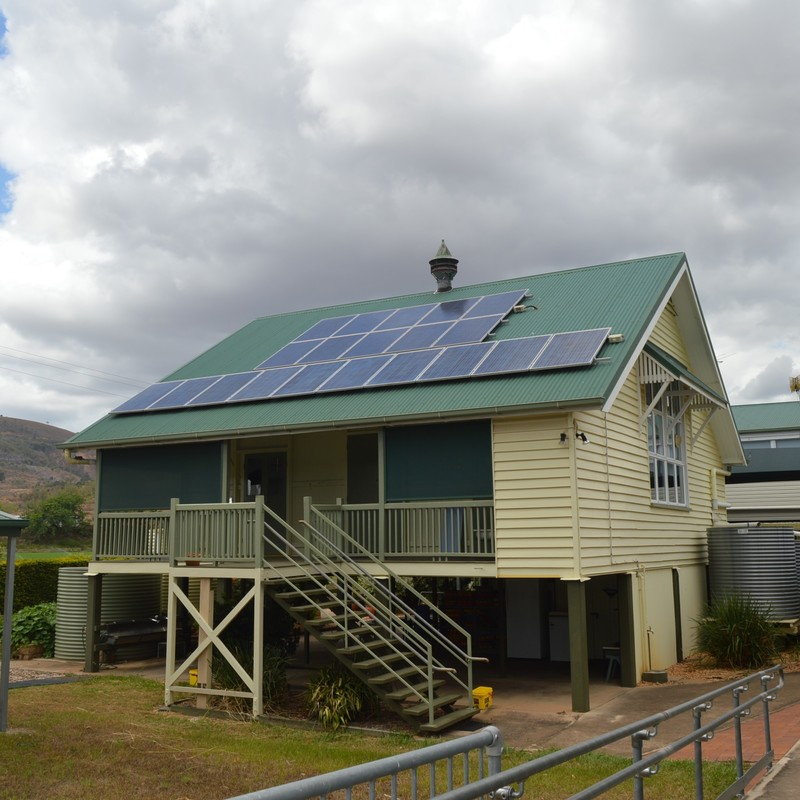
Block A, 2019

At the opening ceremony of the new teaching building in September 1912 (known as Block A in 2019), the progress of the prosperous farming district and the quality of the building was applauded by visiting dignitary, Reverend Hayley of Toowoomba. At the time, it was reported that:

"the main building measures 31ft by 20ft [9.4m x 6.1m], and is placed on high stumps, with spacious verandahs back and front. The lighting and ventilation of the school-room have been done on the most up-to-date lines, and all fittings and appointments are of the latest and best, the school being undoubtedly the finest of its size in the Lockyer."

The 1894 teaching building was subsequently sold by the department to local farmer, Mr Reisenleiter, for £36 and removed from the school grounds. In 1916, a new teachers residence was constructed at a cost of £399. This new and larger residence retained the original residence's semi-detached kitchen wing (the residence is no longer extant on the site).

An important component of Queensland state schools was their grounds and Mount Sylvia was no exception. From the school's beginnings, there had been a focus on sport and outdoor activities. The early and continuing commitment to play-based education, particularly in primary school, resulted in the provision of outdoor play space and sporting facilities, such as ovals and tennis courts. Trees and gardens were planted to shade and beautify schools. From the late nineteenth century, the planting of trees in the school grounds was an important activity for the school community and students participated in Arbor Day celebrations, an annual event in Queensland since 1890. Aesthetically-designed gardens were encouraged by regional inspectors, and educators believed gardening and Arbor Days instilled in young minds the value of hard work and activity, improved classroom discipline, developed aesthetic tastes, and inspired people to stay on the land.

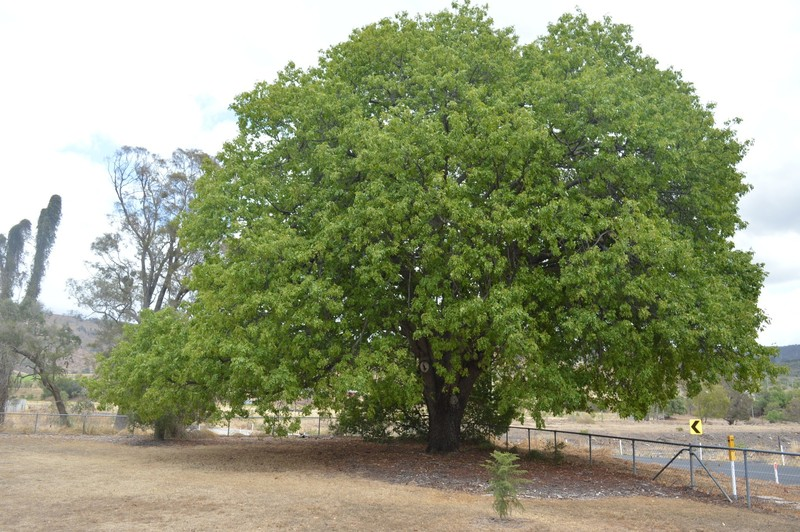
Mature camphor laurel trees, 2019

As an agricultural community, Mount Sylvia was an enthusiastic participant in Arbor Day celebrations. In 1890, the first at the school was held and it was reported that "about twenty trees" had been planted in the school grounds. Arbor Day became a major community event for Mount Sylvia. Each year, celebrations brought the district together for a day of sports and picnics, followed by a dance in the school building in the evening, "visitors simply poured in from the districts around, and it was a pleasure to note the hearty handshakes and welcoming smiles as old acquaintances were renewed". Over the years, a variety of trees were planted in the school grounds, including camphor laurels (Cinnamomum camphora), figs (Ficus spp) and jacarandas (Jacaranda mimosifolia).

Following the 1910 celebrations, it was noted that the jacarandas in the grounds afforded considerable shade, 'a long programme of races for the children and games of all sorts made the morning pass quickly, the school grounds forming a natural race track, and being sheltered by a fine lot of jacaranda trees, outdoor amusements could be indulged in under ideal conditions.' In 2019, the mature trees throughout the school grounds continue to add to the picturesque setting of the school.

During World War II, schools were typically a focus for civilian duty. With the entry of Japan into the war and the fears of Japanese invasion, the Queensland Government closed all coastal state schools between January and March 1942, and student attendance was optional until the war ended. At Mount Sylvia, slit trenches for protecting the students from Japanese air raids were dug in the school grounds, under the jacaranda trees.

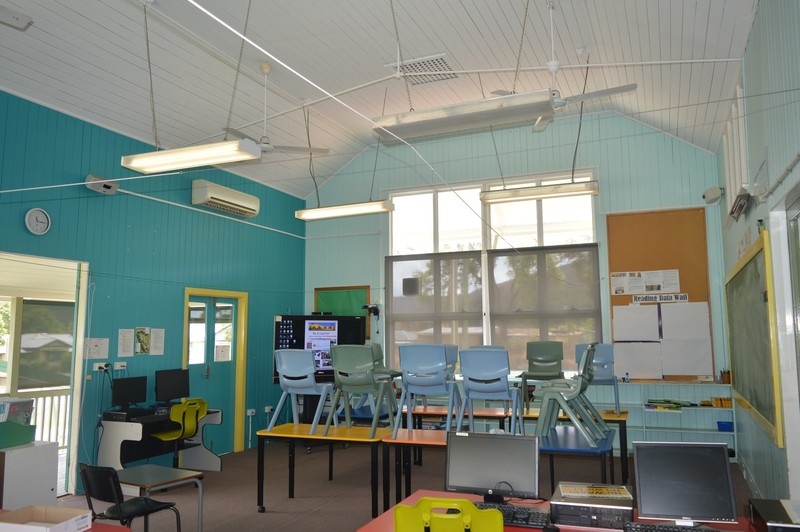
Classroom interior, Block A, 2019

Enrolments remained steady in the post-war period. Following the closure of several primary schools in the district, however, and a subsequent increase in enrolments, a new teaching building, Block B, was constructed to the south of Block A in 1971. Block A was then used as a pre-school. In 1983, a modular building was constructed to the south of Block B. Minor changes were made to Block A over time, including enclosing part of the southern verandah c. 1959 for a library, adding partitions to the interior c. 1970, and subsequently removing the partitions and enclosing the remainder of the southern verandah c. 1980. In 2019 Block A is used as a classroom.

Mount Sylvia State School, established in 1885, has played an important role in the Mount Sylvia district community, and continues to do so. In 1935, the school held its jubilee celebrations with several of the original pupils attending, and ten years later the school's diamond jubilee was celebrated. The school's history was compiled in three publications commemorating the school's 85th, 100th and 125th anniversaries respectively. Generations of students have been taught at Mount Sylvia State School and many social events have been held in the school's grounds and buildings since its establishment. The school continues to be a centre for social, sporting and community events.

== Description ==
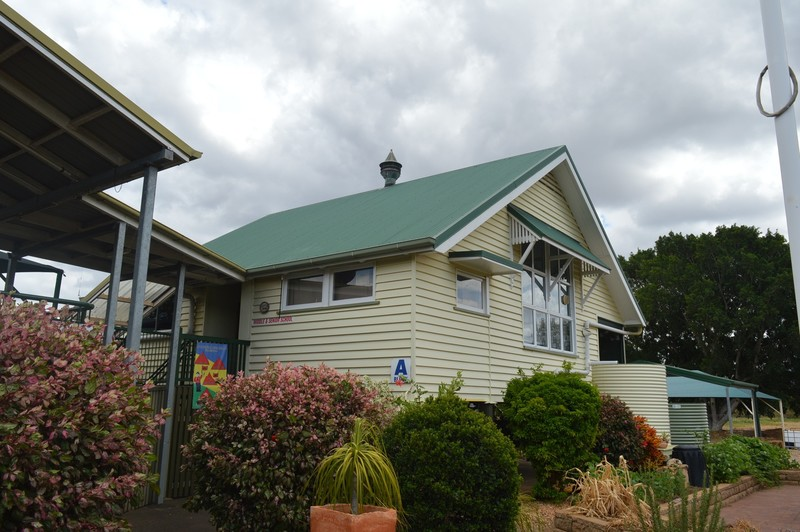
Block A from south-east 2019

Mount Sylvia State School is a small country school occupying a long narrow 1.2ha site in Mount Sylvia, a locality near Gatton in the Lockyer Valley Region. It is surrounded by large agricultural fields and the site is on the corner of Mount Sylvia Road (the main thoroughfare) and Left Hand Branch Road. Tenthill Creek, a seasonal watercourse, runs along the school's western side. The school boundaries are planted with large ornamental shade trees and the school buildings generally stand in a cluster near the centre of the site.

=== Block A (1912) ===
Block A stands toward the front of the cluster of school buildings, facing north across a long playing field fronting Mount Sylvia Road. It is a small, timber-framed and -clad, single-storey, highset teaching building, with verandahs front and back (north and south), and it accommodates a single classroom. Its understorey has a concrete floor and is mostly open for covered play space. The building has a gable roof that is continuous over the verandahs, and large banks of operable windows into the classroom on its east and west gable-end walls. The building retains the original hatrooms at the western end of both verandahs, and the lofty single-classroom volume with coved ceiling.

=== Landscape ===
Significant landscape features are:

- characteristic grounds planting layout of spreading, ornamental shade trees along site boundaries
- mature jacarandas (Jacaranda mimosifolia) generally along western boundary, camphor laurels (Cinnamomum camphora), and fig trees (Ficus sp.) along Mount Sylvia Road
- an open grassed playing field wrapping the north and west sides of Block A, providing play space, and an open setting for Block A
- views from Mount Sylvia Road and Left Hand Branch Road to Block A across the playing field

== Heritage listing ==
Mount Sylvia State School was listed on the Queensland Heritage Register on 28 February 2020 having satisfied the following criteria.

The place is important in demonstrating the evolution or pattern of Queensland's history.

Mount Sylvia State School, established in 1885, is important in demonstrating the evolution of state education and its associated architecture in Queensland. The place retains a good, representative example of a standard government designed school building (Block A, 1912) that was an architectural response to prevailing government educational philosophies, set in large grounds with provision of sport and play areas, and mature trees.

The Department of Public Works timber school building (Block A, 1912) demonstrates the evolution of timber school buildings to provide abundant lighting and ventilation to provide a superior educational environment for Queensland children.

The large school grounds and its mature shade trees and open grassed playing field demonstrate the Queensland Government's recognition of the importance of play and aesthetics in the education of children.

The place is important in demonstrating the principal characteristics of a particular class of cultural places.

Mount Sylvia State School is important in demonstrating the principal characteristics of a Queensland state school. These include: a timber-framed teaching building constructed to standard design by the Queensland Government set in a generous landscaped site with mature trees and play areas. The school is a good example of a small country school.

Block A is a good intact example of a standard Department of Public Works timber school building and demonstrates the principal characteristics of its type. These include its: highset form with gable roof; open understorey play space; front and rear verandahs with hatrooms; timber-framed and -clad construction; single classroom with lofty coved ceiling; and methods to provide abundant provision of natural light and ventilation to the interior including its roof fleche and hinged ventilation boards, large banks of operable windows, and ceiling vents.

The place has a strong or special association with a particular community or cultural group for social, cultural or spiritual reasons.

Mount Sylvia State School has a strong and ongoing association with past and present pupils, parents, staff members, and the surrounding community through sustained use since its establishment in 1885. With more than 130 years of association with the Mount Sylvia community, and generations of children taught at the school, the school reflects the strong community demand for state-run education.
