= List of Brisbane suburbs =

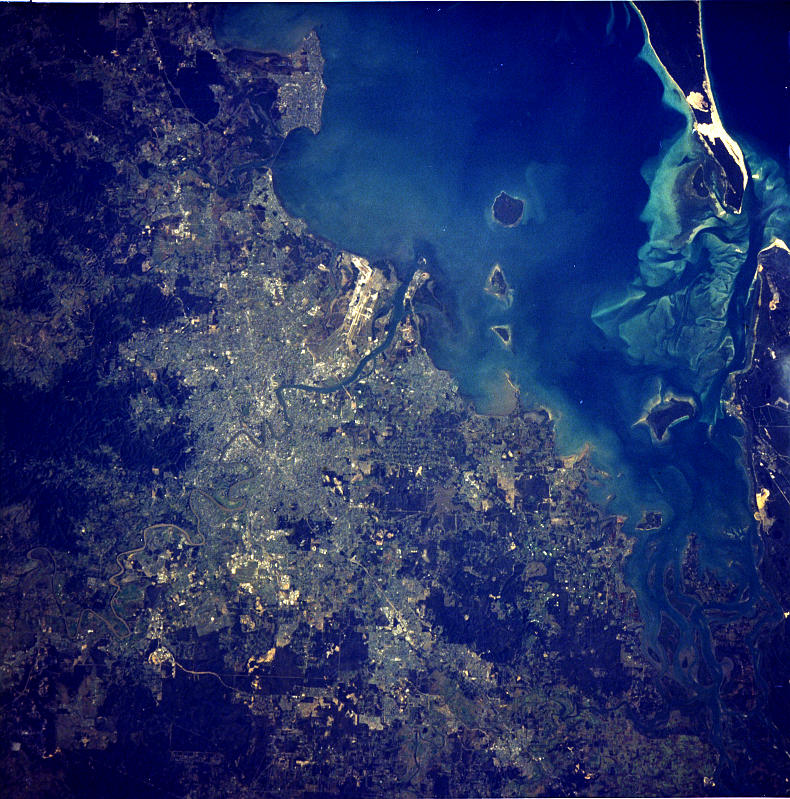
Satellite image of the Brisbane Metropolitan Area, centred on the City of Brisbane, it captures from the Redcliffe Peninsula in the north, D'Aguilar National Park to the west, east to Moreton and Stradbroke Islands, and Logan City in the south

Brisbane central business district seen from Mount Coot-tha Lookout

This is a list of the almost 450 suburbs in Brisbane, Queensland, Australia.

== Local government areas ==
The Greater Brisbane, according to the Australian Bureau of Statistics, consists of the following local government areas (LGAs), with populations in 2019:

Local government area	Population (2019)	Area	Density	Capital City Statistical Division (old)	Greater Capital City Statistical Area (Greater Brisbane)
City of Brisbane	1,253,982	1,343 km^{2}	934 /km^{2}	Capital City Statistical Division (old)	Greater Capital City Statistical Area (Greater Brisbane)
City of Moreton Bay	469,465	2,042 km^{2}	230 /km^{2}	Capital City Statistical Division (old)	Greater Capital City Statistical Area (Greater Brisbane)
Logan City	334,358	958 km^{2}	349 /km^{2}	Capital City Statistical Division (old)	Greater Capital City Statistical Area (Greater Brisbane)
City of Ipswich	222,307	1,094 km^{2}	203 /km^{2}	Capital City Statistical Division (old)	Greater Capital City Statistical Area (Greater Brisbane)
Redland City	158,815	537 km^{2}	296 /km^{2}	Capital City Statistical Division (old)	Greater Capital City Statistical Area (Greater Brisbane)
Total	2,438,927	5,974 km^{2}	408 /km^{2}	Capital City Statistical Division (old)	Greater Capital City Statistical Area (Greater Brisbane)
Scenic Rim Region	43,123	4,243 km^{2}	10 /km^{2}		Greater Capital City Statistical Area (Greater Brisbane)
Somerset Region	26,219	5,373 km^{2}	5 /km^{2}		Greater Capital City Statistical Area (Greater Brisbane)
Lockyer Valley Region (part)	5,915	252 km^{2}	23 /km^{2}		Greater Capital City Statistical Area (Greater Brisbane)
Total	2,514,184	15,842 km^{2}	158 /km^{2}		Greater Capital City Statistical Area (Greater Brisbane)

== Suburbs of the City of Brisbane ==
City of Brisbane has 194 suburbs (190 on the mainland and 4 on Moreton Island). There is no formal system of regions, but Brisbane suburbs are informally grouped by Brisbane residents based on their relation to the Brisbane River and the Brisbane CBD. Generally the following rules apply, Northern Suburbs include suburbs north of the Brisbane River, Southern Suburbs include suburbs south of the Brisbane River. The exceptions are Western Suburbs, which include suburbs north and south of the Brisbane River, but also west of the Brisbane CBD, and Bayside Suburbs which include suburbs along Moreton Bay.

=== Inner suburbs ===
Bowen Hills – Brisbane City – East Brisbane – Fortitude Valley – Herston – Highgate Hill – Kangaroo Point – Kelvin Grove – New Farm – Newstead – Paddington – Petrie Terrace – Red Hill – South Brisbane – Spring Hill – Teneriffe – West End – Woolloongabba

Subtotal: 18

=== Northern suburbs ===
Albion – Alderley – Ascot – Aspley – Bald Hills – Banyo – Boondall – Bracken Ridge – Bridgeman Downs – Brighton – Brisbane Airport – Carseldine – Chermside – Chermside West – Clayfield – Deagon – Eagle Farm – Everton Park – Ferny Grove – Fitzgibbon – Gaythorne – Geebung – Gordon Park – Grange – Hamilton – Hendra – Kalinga – Kedron – Keperra – Lutwyche – McDowall – Mitchelton – Newmarket – Northgate – Nudgee – Nudgee Beach – Nundah – Pinkenba – Sandgate – Shorncliffe – Stafford – Stafford Heights – Taigum – Virginia – Wavell Heights – Wilston – Windsor – Wooloowin – Zillmere

Subtotal: 49

=== Southern suburbs ===
Acacia Ridge – Algester – Annerley – Archerfield – Burbank – Calamvale – Coopers Plains – Darra – Doolandella – Drewvale – Durack – Dutton Park – Eight Mile Plains – Ellen Grove – Fairfield – Forest Lake – Greenslopes – Heathwood – Holland Park – Holland Park West – Inala – Karawatha – Kuraby – Larapinta – MacGregor – Mackenzie – Mansfield – Moorooka – Mount Gravatt – Mount Gravatt East – Nathan – Pallara – Parkinson – Richlands – Robertson – Rochedale – Rocklea – Runcorn – Salisbury – Stones Corner – Stretton – Sumner – Sunnybank – Sunnybank Hills – Tarragindi – Tennyson – Upper Mount Gravatt – Wacol – Willawong – Wishart – Yeerongpilly – Yeronga

Subtotal: 52

=== Eastern suburbs ===
Balmoral – Belmont – Bulimba – Camp Hill – Cannon Hill – Carina – Carina Heights – Carindale – Chandler – Coorparoo – Gumdale – Hawthorne – Hemmant – Lota – Lytton – Manly – Manly West – Morningside – Murarrie – Norman Park – Port of Brisbane – Ransome – Seven Hills – Tingalpa – Wakerley – Wynnum – Wynnum West

Subtotal: 27

=== Western suburbs ===
Anstead – Ashgrove – Auchenflower – Banks Creek– Bardon – Bellbowrie – Brookfield – Chapel Hill – Chelmer – Chuwar – Corinda – England Creek– Enoggera – Enoggera Reservoir – Fig Tree Pocket – Graceville – Indooroopilly – Jamboree Heights – Jindalee – Karana Downs – Kenmore – Kenmore Hills – Kholo – Lake Manchester – Middle Park – Milton – Moggill – Mount Coot-tha – Mount Crosby – Mount Ommaney – Oxley – Pinjarra Hills – Pullenvale – Riverhills – Seventeen Mile Rocks – Sherwood – Sinnamon Park – St Lucia – Taringa – The Gap – Toowong – Upper Brookfield – Upper Kedron – Westlake

Subtotal: 44

=== Moreton Island suburbs ===
Bulwer - Cowan Cowan - Kooringal - Moreton Island

Subtotal: 4

Total: 194

== Suburbs of Ipswich ==
=== Urban Ipswich ===
Augustine Heights – Barellan Point – Basin Pocket – Bellbird Park – Blacksoil – Blackstone – Booval – Brassall – Brookwater – Bundamba – Camira – Carole Park – Churchill – Chuwar – Coalfalls – Collingwood Park – Dinmore – East Ipswich – Eastern Heights – Ebbw Vale – Flinders View – Gailes – Goodna – Ipswich – Karalee – Karrabin – Leichhardt – Moores Pocket – Muirlea – New Chum – Newtown – North Booval – North Ipswich – North Tivoli – One Mile – Raceview – Redbank – Redbank Plains – Riverview – Sadliers Crossing – Silkstone – Springfield – Springfield Central – Springfield Lakes – Tivoli – West Ipswich – Woodend – Wulkuraka – Yamanto

Total: 49

=== Rural Ipswich ===
Amberley – Ashwell – Calvert – Deebing Heights – Ebenezer – Goolman – Grandchester – Haigslea – Ironbark – Jeebropilly – Lanefield – Marburg – Mount Forbes – Mount Marrow – Mutdapilly – Pine Mountain – Purga – Ripley – Rosewood – South Ripley – Spring Mountain – Swanbank – Tallegalla – Thagoona – The Bluff – Walloon – White Rock – Willowbank – Woolshed

Total: 29

== Suburbs of Logan City ==
Bahrs Scrub – Bannockburn – Beenleigh – Belivah – Berrinba – Bethania – Boronia Heights – Browns Plains – Buccan – Carbrook – Cedar Creek – Cedar Grove – Cedar Vale – Chambers Flat – Cornubia – Crestmead – Daisy Hill – Eagleby – Edens Landing – Forestdale – Greenbank – Heritage Park – Hillcrest – Holmview – Jimboomba – Kagaru – Kingston – Logan Central – Logan Reserve – Logan Village – Loganholme – Loganlea – Lyons – Marsden – Meadowbrook – Mount Warren Park – Mundoolun – Munruben – New Beith – North Maclean – Park Ridge South – Park Ridge – Priestdale – Regents Park – Rochedale South – Shailer Park – Slacks Creek – South Maclean – Springwood – Stockleigh – Tamborine – Tanah Merah – Underwood – Undullah – Veresdale Scrub – Veresdale – Waterford West – Waterford – Windaroo – Wolffdene – Woodhill – Woodridge – Yarrabilba

Total: 63

== Suburbs of Redland City ==
Alexandra Hills – Amity Point – Birkdale – Capalaba – Cleveland – Coochiemudlo Island – Dunwich – Karragarra Island – Lamb Island – Macleay Island – Mount Cotton – North Stradbroke Island – Ormiston – Point Lookout – Redland Bay – Russell Island – Sheldon – Thorneside – Thornlands – Victoria Point – Wellington Point

Total: 21

== Suburbs of the City of Moreton Bay ==
=== Urban suburbs ===
Albany Creek – Arana Hills – Banksia Beach – Beachmere – Bellara – Bongaree – Bray Park – Brendale – Bunya – Burpengary – Caboolture – Caboolture South – Cashmere – Clontarf – Dakabin – Deception Bay – Eatons Hill – Elimbah – Everton Hills – Ferny Hills – Godwin Beach – Griffin – Joyner – Kallangur – Kippa-Ring – Kurwongbah – Lawnton – Mango Hill – Margate – Moodlu – Morayfield – Murrumba Downs – Narangba – Newport – Ningi – North Lakes – Petrie – Redcliffe – Rothwell – Sandstone Point – Scarborough – Strathpine – Upper Caboolture – Warner – Whiteside – Woody Point – Woorim

Total: 47

=== Rural suburbs ===
Armstrong Creek – Bellmere – Bellthorpe – Booroobin – Bracalba – Camp Mountain – Campbells Pocket – Cedar Creek – Cedarton – Clear Mountain – Closeburn – Commissioners Flat – Coymbia - D'Aguilar – Dayboro – Delaneys Creek – Donnybrook – Draper – Greenstone - Highvale – Jollys Lookout – King Scrub – Kobble Creek – Laceys Creek – Lilywood - Meldale – Moorina – Mount Delaney – Mount Glorious – Mount Mee – Mount Nebo – Mount Pleasant – Mount Samson – Neurum – Ocean View – Rocksberg – Rush Creek – Samford Valley – Samford Village – Samsonvale – Stanmore – Stony Creek – Toorbul – Wagtail Grove - Wamuran Basin – Wamuran – Waraba - Welsby – White Patch – Wights Mountain – Woodford – Yugar

Total: 52

== Scenic Rim Region ==
=== Beaudesert area ===
Beaudesert – Beechmont – Benobble – Biddaddaba – Birnam – Boyland – Bromelton – Canungra – Christmas Creek – Cryna – Gleneagle – Hillview – Innisplain – Josephville – Kerry – Kooralbyn – Lamington – Lamington National Park – Laravale – Palen Creek – Rathdowney – Tabooba – Tabragalba – Tamborine Mountain – Tamrookum – Tamrookum Creek – Witheren – Wonglepong

=== Boonah area ===
Aratula – Boonah – Charlwood – Coulson – Fassifern – Harrisville – Kalbar – Maroon – Moogerah – Mount Alford – Mount Walker – Roadvale – Rosevale – Silverdale – Tarome – Templin – Warrill View

=== Other areas ===
Allandale – Allenview – Anthony – Barney View – Binna Burra – Blantyre – Bunburra – Bunjurgen – Burnett Creek – Cainbable – Cannon Creek – Carneys Creek – Chinghee Creek – Clumber – Coleyville – Coochin – Croftby – Darlington – Dugandan – Fassifern Valley – Ferny Glen – Flying Fox – Frazerview – Frenches Creek – Hoya – Illinbah – Kagaru – Kents Lagoon – Kents Pocket – Knapp Creek – Kulgun – Limestone Ridges – Lower Mount Walker – Merryvale – Milbong – Milford – Milora – Moorang – Morwincha – Mount Barney – Mount Edwards – Mount Forbes – Mount French – Mount Gipps – Mount Lindesay – Mount Walker West – Munbilla – Mutdapilly – Nindooinbah – North Tamborine – Oaky Creek – Obum Obum – O'Reilly – Peak Crossing – Radford – Running Creek – Sarabah – Southern Lamington – Tamborine – Teviotville – Undullah – Veresdale – Veresdale Scrub – Wallaces Creek – Washpool – Wilsons Plains – Woolooman – Wyaralong

== Somerset Region ==
=== Kilcoy area ===
Glenfern – Hazeldean – Jimna – Kilcoy – Monsildale – Villeneuve – Winya

=== Esk area ===
Borallon – Caboonbah – Clarendon – Colinton – Coolana – Coominya – Dundas – Esk – Fairney View – Fernvale – Glamorgan Vale – Harlin – Lake Somerset – Lake Wivenhoe – Lark Hill – Linville – Lowood – Minden – Moore – Mount Hallen – Mount Tarampa – Prenzlau – Rifle Range – Tarampa – Toogoolawah – Vernor – Wanora

=== Other areas ===
Atkinsons Dam – Avoca Vale – Banks Creek – Biarra – Braemore – Brightview – Bryden – Buaraba – Coal Creek – Cooeeimbardi – Cressbrook – Crossdale – England Creek – Eskdale – Fulham – Glen Esk – Gregors Creek – Haigslea – Ivory Creek – Kingaham – Lake Manchester – Lockrose – Lower Cressbrook – Marburg – Moombra – Mount Archer – Mount Beppo – Mount Byron – Mount Kilcoy – Mount Stanley – Murrumba – Ottaba – Patrick Estate – Redbank Creek – Royston – Sandy Creek – Scrub Creek – Sheep Station Creek – Somerset Dam – Split Yard Creek – Westvale – Wivenhoe Hill – Wivenhoe Pocket – Woolmar – Yimbun

== Lockyer Valley Region ==
=== Gatton area ===
Adare – Blanchview – College View – Fordsdale – Gatton – Grantham – Helidon – Iredale – Junction View – Lake Clarendon – Lawes – Lower Tenthill – Ma Ma Creek – Murphys Creek – Placid Hills – Ropeley – Thornton – Upper Tenthill – Veradilla – Winwill – Withcott – Woodlands

=== Laidley area ===
Blenheim – Forest Hill – Glenore Grove – Hatton Vale – Kentville – Laidley – Laidley Heights – Lockrose – Mulgowie – Plainland – Regency Downs

=== Other areas ===
Ballard – Black Duck Creek – Brightview – Buaraba South – Caffey – Carpendale – Churchable – Crowley Vale – Derrymore – East Haldon – Egypt – Fifteen Mile – Flagstone Creek – Glen Cairn – Helidon Spa – Ingoldsby – Kensington Grove – Laidley Creek West – Laidley North – Laidley South – Lefthand Branch – Lilydale – Lockyer – Lockyer Waters – Lynford – Morton Vale – Mount Berryman – Mount Sylvia – Mount Whitestone – Postmans Ridge – Preston – Ringwood – Rockmount – Rockside – Seventeen Mile – Silver Ridge – Spring Creek – Stockyard – Summerholm – Townson – Upper Flagstone – Upper Lockyer – Vinegar Hill – West Haldon – White Mountain – Woodbine

== See also ==
- Brisbane suburbs with Aboriginal names
