= List of schools in West Moreton =

This is a list of schools in the West Moreton region of South East Queensland, Australia. The region consists of the Lockyer Valley, Somerset and Scenic Rim regions and the rural part of the City of Ipswich. Prior to 2015, the Queensland education system consisted of primary schools, which accommodated students from Kindergarten to Year 7 (ages 5–13), and high schools, which accommodate students from Years 8 to 12 (ages 12–18). However, from 2015, Year 7 became the first year of high school.

== State schools ==
=== State primary schools ===
Name	Suburb	LGA	Opened	Coords	Notes
Amberley District State School	Yamanto	Ipswich	1862	27.65749°S 152.75013°E	Formerly Amberley State School until 2010. At 37 Deebing Creek Road.
Aratula State School	Aratula	Scenic Rim	1911	27.9808°S 152.5441°E	At 41 Elizabeth Street.
Ashwell State School	Ashwell	Ipswich	1887	27.6294°S 152.5565°E	At 35 Reinke Road.
Beaudesert State School	Beaudesert	Scenic Rim	1882	27.9888°S 153.0023°E	At 17 Tina Street.
Beechmont State School	Beechmont	Scenic Rim	1904	28.1248°S 153.1856°E	At 1922 Beechmont Road.
Blenheim State School	Blenheim	Lockyer Valley	1879	27.6501°S 152.3317°E	At 81 Blenheim Road. Listed on the Queensland Heritage Register.
Boonah State School	Boonah	Scenic Rim	1878	27.9977°S 152.6811°E	On Park Street.
Canungra State School	Canungra	Scenic Rim	1889	28.0169°S 153.1623°E	Originally opened as Caningera Upper Provisional School, becoming a full State School in 1909. Name changed to Canungra State School in 1912. Located at 5–9 Christie Street.
Clarendon State School	Clarendon	Somerset	1929	27.4398°S 152.5425°E	At 507 Clarendon Road.
Coominya State School	Coominya	Somerset	1912	27.3922°S 152.5008°E	At 7 Cornhill Street.
Darlington State School	Darlington	Scenic Rim	1890	28.2056°S 153.0400°E	At 2744 Kerry Road.
Esk State School	Esk	Somerset	1875	27.2475°S 152.4263°E	At 49 East Street.
Fernvale State School	Fernvale	Somerset	1874	27.4467°S 152.6441°E	At 1605 Brisbane Valley Highway.
Flagstone Creek State School	Flagstone Creek	Lockyer Valley	1886	27.6155°S 152.1149°E	At 56 Flagstone School Road.
Forest Hill State School	Forest Hill	Lockyer Valley	1893	27.5905°S 152.3543°E	At 15 Church Street. The teacher's residence is listed on the Queensland Heritage Register.
Gatton State School	Gatton	Lockyer Valley	1876	27.5601°S 152.2783°E	At 26 William Street.
Glamorgan Vale State School	Glamorgan Vale	Somerset	1875	27.5149°S 152.6323°E	At 750 Glamorgan Vale Road.
Gleneagle State School	Gleneagle	Scenic Rim	1891	27.9378°S 152.9824°E	At 126–146 Mount Lindesay Highway.
Glenore Grove State School	Glenore Grove	Lockyer Valley	1906	27.5299°S 152.4080°E	At 3 Brightview Road.
Grandchester State School	Grandchester	Ipswich	1878	27.6655°S 152.4653°E	At 35 School Road.
Grantham State School	Grantham	Lockyer Valley	1905	27.5740°S 152.2020°E	At 15 Victor Street.
Haigslea State School	Haigslea	Ipswich	1876	27.5717°S 152.6297°E	At 760–766 Thagoona Haigslea Road.
Harlin State School	Harlin	Somerset	1908	26.9740°S 152.3574°E	At 8521 Brisbane Valley Highway.
Harrisville State School	Harrisville	Scenic Rim	1891	27.8126°S 152.6673°E	At 17 Hall Street.
Hatton Vale State School	Hatton Vale	Lockyer Valley	1881	27.5434°S 152.4709°E	At 27–35 Hannant Road.
Helidon State School	Helidon	Lockyer Valley	1874	27.5550°S 152.1257°E	At 16 School Street.
Hillview State School	Hillview	Scenic Rim	1887	28.2117°S 153.0045°E	Formerly known as Christmas Creek State School until 1914. At 1623 Christmas Creek Road.
Ipswich East State School	East Ipswich	Ipswich	1958	27.6068°S 152.7769°E	At 18–24 Jacaranda Street.
Ipswich North State School	North Ipswich	Ipswich	1934	27.6018°S 152.7633°E	At 9 Fitzgibbon Street.
Ipswich West State School	West Ipswich	Ipswich	1919	27.6207°S 152.7506°E	At 12 Omar Street (corner of Keogh Street).
Kalbar State School	Kalbar	Scenic Rim	1879	27.94284°S 152.62333°E	On George Street.
Kentville State School	Kentville	Lockyer Valley	1907	27.4790°S 152.4272°E	At 4 Turpin Road.
Kilcoy State School	Kilcoy	Somerset	1892	26.9456°S 152.5618°E	Originally opened as Kilcoy Township Provisional School then changed name to Kilcoy Provisional School in 1893. By 1898 the name had been changed again to Hopetoun Provisional School, which in turn became Hopetoun State School in 1909. In 1914 the name was changed for the last time, to Kilcoy State School. At 47 Royston Street.
Laidley District State School	Laidley	Lockyer Valley	1999	27.6239°S 152.3958°E	Merger of Laidley North State School and Laidley Central State School, operates on the site of the former Laidley North State School at 218–220 Patrick Street.
Lake Clarendon State School	Lake Clarendon	Lockyer Valley	1902	27.5216°S 152.3582°E	Located at 35 Lake Clarendon Road. Listed on the Queensland Heritage Register.
Linville State School	Linville	Somerset	1901	26.8467°S 152.2784°E	At 15 Wells Street (corner of George Street.
Lockrose State School	Lockrose	Lockyer Valley	1905	27.4936°S 152.4601°E	At 17 Zabel Road.
Lowood State School	Lowood	Somerset	1881	27.4657°S 152.5816°E	At 32 Peace Street.
Ma Ma Creek State School	Ma Ma Creek	Lockyer Valley	1880–1916		The school was relocated in 1916.
Ma Ma Creek State School	Ma Ma Creek	Lockyer Valley	1916	27.6288°S 152.1900°E	At 803 Gatton-Clifton Road.
Marburg State School	Marburg	Ipswich	1879	27.5624°S 152.5939°E	At 40–54 School Street. Listed on the Queensland Heritage Register.
Maroon State School	Maroon	Scenic Rim	1891	28.1716°S 152.7137°E	At 2772 Boonah-Rathdowney Road. Listed on the Queensland Heritage Register.
Minden State School	Minden	Somerset	1878	27.5547°S 152.5441°E	At 1032 Lowood-Minden Road.
Mount Alford State School	Mount Alford	Scenic Rim	1888	28.0682°S 152.5947°E	At 942 Reckumpilla Street.
Mount Kilcoy State School	Mount Kilcoy	Somerset	1909	26.8736°S 152.5869°E	At 251 Jenkinsons Road.
Mount Marrow State School	Mount Marrow	Ipswich	1909	27.6036°S 152.6214°E	At 272 Thagoona-Haigslea Road.
Mount Sylvia State School	Mount Sylvia	Lockyer Valley	1885	27.7230°S 152.2240°E	At 6 Left Hand Branch Road. Listed on the Queensland Heritage Register.
Mount Tarampa State School	Mount Tarampa	Somerset	1906	27.4552°S 152.4899°E	At 9 Profkes Road. Listed on the Queensland Heritage Register.
Mount Whitestone State School	Mount Whitestone	Lockyer Valley	1886	27.6650°S 152.1601°E	At 1313 Gatton-Clifton Road.
Murphy's Creek State School	Murphys Creek	Lockyer Valley	1870	27.4588°S 152.0513°E	At 49 Murphys Creek School Road.
Mutdapilly State School	Mutdapilly	Scenic Rim	1874	27.7710°S 152.6506°E	At 4 Mutdapilly-Churchbank Weir Road.
Patrick Estate State School	Patrick Estate	Somerset	1925	27.4109°S 152.5679°E	At 816 Mahon Road.
Peak Crossing State School	Peak Crossing	Scenic Rim	1871	27.7798°S 152.7312°E	At 1323 Ipswich-Boonah Road.
Prenzlau State School	Prenzlau	Somerset	1894	27.5340°S 152.5232°E	At 357 Prenzlau Road. Listed on the Queensland Heritage Register.
Rathdowney State School	Rathdowney	Scenic Rim	1912	28.2156°S 152.8605°E	At 143–155 Mount Lindesay Highway.
Roadvale State School	Roadvale	Scenic Rim	1889	27.9201°S 152.7050°E	At 111 Roadvale Road. Listed on the Queensland Heritage Register.
Ropeley State School	Ropeley	Lockyer Valley	1890	27.6579°S 152.2587°E	Deep Gully Provisional School opened in 1890 and in 1892 was renamed Ropeley Provisional School. On 2 September 1901, it became Ropeley State School. The school celebrated its centenary in 1990. At 4 Hoger Road.
Rosewood State School	Rosewood	Ipswich	1870	27.6435°S 152.5926°E	At 20 School Street.
St Bernard State School	Tamborine Mountain	Scenic Rim	1914	27.9704°S 153.1982°E	At 1–19 School Road.
Tamborine Mountain State School	Tamborine Mountain	Scenic Rim	1900	27.9308°S 153.2002°E	At 104–118 Curtis Road.
Tamrookum State School	Tamrookum	Scenic Rim	1939	28.1064°S 152.9155°E	At 9019 Mount Lindesay Highway.
Tarampa State School	Tarampa	Somerset	1880	27.4871°S 152.5461°E	At 18 Manthey Road. Listed on the Queensland Heritage Register.
Tent Hill Lower State School	Lower Tenthill	Lockyer Valley	1873	27.59202°S 152.23628°E	At 90 Lower Tenthill Road.
Thornton State School	Thornton	Lockyer Valley	1881	27.7982°S 152.3720°E	At 4 Thornton School Road.
Toogoolawah State School	Toogoolawah	Somerset	1905	27.0917°S 152.3792°E	In Gardner Street.
Veresdale Scrub State School	Veresdale Scrub	Logan	1899	27.9214°S 153.0176°E	At 354 Veresdale Scrub School Road.
Walloon State School	Walloon	Ipswich	1877	27.6056°S 152.6631°E	At 528 Karrabin Rosewood Road.
Warrill View State School	Warrill View	Scenic Rim	1910	27.8229°S 152.6160°E	At 7–19 Ipswich Street.
Withcott State School	Withcott	Lockyer Valley	1912–1971	27.5416°S 152.0195°E	From 1912 to its closure in 1971, the location was 159 Roches Road (corner of Little Oakey Creek Road).
Withcott State School	Withcott	Lockyer Valley	1984–	27.5594°S 152.0237°E	The school reopened in 1984 at 26 Biggs Road.
Woodhill State School	Woodhill	Logan	1873	27.8929°S 152.9737°E	At 6027 Mount Lindesay Highway.

=== State high schools and colleges ===
Name	Suburb	LGA	Opened	Coords	Notes
Beaudesert State High School	Beaudesert	Scenic Rim	1963	27.9707°S 152.9970°E	At 271–297 Brisbane Street.
Boonah State High School	Boonah	Scenic Rim	1965	27.9954°S 152.6891°E	At 32 Macquarie Street.
Kilcoy State High School	Kilcoy	Somerset	1972	26.9397°S 152.5672°E	In Seib Street.
Laidley State High School	Laidley	Lockyer Valley	1985	27.6362°S 152.4044°E	At 98 Alfred Street.
Lockyer District State High School	Gatton	Lockyer Valley	1961	27.5669°S 152.2769°E	At 100 William Street.
Lowood State High School	Lowood	Somerset	1983	27.4671°S 152.5824°E	At 28 Prospect Street.
Rosewood State High School	Rosewood	Ipswich	1980	27.6358°S 152.5856°E	At 46 Lanefield Road .
Tamborine Mountain State High School	Tamborine Mountain	Scenic Rim	2001	27.9328°S 153.1900°E	Formerly Helensvale State High School (Tamborine Mountain Campus). At 67–87 Holt Road.
Toogoolawah State High School	Toogoolawah	Somerset	1988	27.1026°S 152.3883°E	At 76 Old Mount Beppo Road.

=== Defunct state schools ===
Name	Suburb	LGA	Opened	Closed	Coords	Notes
Allandale State School	Allandale	Scenic Rim	1928	1963	28.0025°S 152.7297°E	Located near the intersection of Radcliffe/Geiger Road and Hutchinson Road.
Atkinson's Lagoon State School	Atkinsons Dam	Somerset	1885	1968	27.4144°S 152.4300°E	Located near the intersection of the south-west corner of the present Atkinsons Dam Road and Rocky Creek Road.
Barney View State School	Barney View	Scenic Rim	1918	1961	28.2534°S 152.7956°E	Located at 504 Barney View Road.
Biddaddaba Creek State School	Biddaddaba	Scenic Rim	1933	1959	28.00111°S 153.11685°E	Located at 363 Biddaddaba Creek Road.
Black Duck State School	Black Duck Creek	Lockyer Valley	1910	1922	approx 27.8311°S 152.1777°E	Black Duck Creek State School (also known as Black Duck State School) opened in 1910 on 2 acres (0.81 ha) of land donated by Mr E. J. Easement in 1909 on Black Duck Street Road. In 1922, the school buildings were moved to neighbouring Junction View, ready for re-opening as Junction View State School from 18 August 1922.
Blanchview State School	Blanchview	Lockyer Valley	1890	1965	27.5719°S 152.0354°E	Monkey Waterholes Provisional School opened on 7 July 1890. It became Monkey Waterholes State School in 1909 and was renamed Blanch View State School in 1913. Blanchview State School closed in 1965. The school was on a 2-acre (0.81 ha) reserve within present-day 358 Blanchview Road. The site is marked by a plaque (27.5719°S 152.0354°E). The school building was relocated to another site and is used as a farm building.
Blantyre State School	Blantyre	Scenic Rim	1876	1969	27.9052°S 152.6844°E	Located on the western half of 107 Blantyre Road. Following the closure, the school building was relocated to the Laidley Pioneer Village.
Bravenia State School	near Coominya	Somerset	1922	1923		Opened 1 August 1922
Brightview State School	Brightview	Somerset	1902	1962	27.49938°S 152.49831°E	Opened 1902 as Tarampa Flat Provisional School, renamed 1906 Brightview Provisional School. Located at 1060 Brightview Road.
Bromelton State School	Bromelton	Scenic Rim	1880	1953	27.9869°S 152.9389°E	On a 30-acre (12 ha) site on the western side of Sandy Creek Road.
Brooklands State School	Allenview	Scenic Rim	1910	1965	approx 27.8738°S 152.9331°E	At approximately 637 Brookland Road.
Bryden State School	Bryden	Somerset	1876	1936	27.2696°S 152.5827°E	Previously known as Mount Brisbane Provisional School, Mount Brisbane State School, Deep Creek State School, and Bryden Provisional School. The school was on a three-acre (1.2 ha) site on Loughrans Road.
Bryden State School	Bryden	Somerset	1947	1963	27.2696°S 152.5827°E	Previously known as Mount Brisbane Provisional School, Mount Brisbane State School, Deep Creek State School, and Bryden Provisional School. The school was on a three-acre (1.2 ha) site on Loughrans Road.
Buaraba State School	Buaraba	Somerset	1922	1966	27.3631°S 152.32112°E	At 421 Buaraba Creek Road. The school building is still extant.
Bunjurgen State School	Bunjurgen	Scenic Rim	1887	1968	approx 28.0412°S 152.6220°E	Originally opened as Mount French Provisional School in 1887 and renamed Coochin Lower in 1901. It became a State School in 1909 and finally, Bunjurgen State School in 1926. It was on Mount Alford Road.
Burnett Creek State School	Burnett Creek	Scenic Rim	1902	1921	28.2434°S 152.5856°E	Located at 1418 Burnett Creek Road.
Caffey State School	Caffey	Lockyer Valley	1927	1971	27.6967°S 152.2169°E	Located on the south-eastern corner of the junction of Tenthill Creek and Mount Sylvia Road.
Calvert State School	Calvert	Ipswich	1872	1972	27.6647°S 152.5212°E	Opened as Alfred State School, renamed Calvert in 1910. Located at 29–35 Newcastle Street.
Carney's Creek State School	Carneys Creek	Scenic Rim	1890	1970	approx 28.2032°S 152.5584°E	Located on Chalk Road.
Carpendale State School	Carpendale	Lockyer Valley	1924	1982	27.5885°S 152.1587°E	Located at 10 Gormans Road.
Cedar Grove State School	Cedar Grove	Logan	1923	1965	27.8622°S 152.9975°E	The former Martindale State School school building was relocated to 19–29 Cedar Grove Road, where it opened as Cedar Grove State School in 1923. It closed in 1965.
Charlwood State School	Charlwood	Scenic Rim	1896	1958	28.0165°S 152.5679°E	Located at 748 Lake Moogerah Road.
Chinghee Creek State School	Chinghee Creek	Scenic Rim	1912	1973	28.2808°S 152.9830°E	Located at 495 Chinghee Creek Road.
Coal Creek State School	Coal Creek	Somerset	1892	1948	27.1728°S 152.4334°E	Located at 154 Coal Creek Road.
Coleyville State School	Coleyville	Scenic Rim	1890	1964	27.8154°S 152.5646°E	Located at 1080 Coleyville Road.
Colinton State School	Colinton	Somerset	1879	1969	26.9333°S 152.3171°E	Located on Emu Creek Road.
College View State School	College View (now in Lawes)	Lockyer Valley	1901	1958	approx 27.54456°S 152.34162°E	Located at 5391 Warrego Highway.
Cooeeimbardi State School	Cooeeimbardi	Somerset	1928	1953	approx 27.1103°S 152.4840°E	Located west of Cooeeimbardi Road.
Coulson State School	Coulson	Scenic Rim	1881	1993	27.9533°S 152.7210°E	Known as Teviotville until 1903 when that name was taken on by another school. Located at 3522 Ipswich Boonah Road.
Cressbrook State School	Cressbrook	Somerset	1877	1895		
Cressbrook Lower State School	Lower Cressbrook, now in Fulham	Somerset	1916	1953	27.05595°S 152.45333°E	Located at 2 Monks Road (corner Cooeeimbardi Road) in Fulham.
Crowley Vale State School	Crowley Vale	Lockyer Valley	1916	circa 1941	27.54374°S 152.37831°E	Opened 1916 as Verdant Vale State School, renamed 1918 Crowley Vale State School. Located at 42 Crowley Vale Road (corner of Warrego Highway). Following its closure, in 1951, it was relocated to Gatton Agricultural College as a lunchroom for farm hands. In 1995, it was re-located to its present position west of Services Road (27.54925°S 152.33957°E).
Derrymore State School	Derrymore	Lockyer Valley	1889	1922		Originally named Puzzling Gully Provisional School, becoming Puzzling Gully State School in 1909. Changed name to Derrymore State School in 1914.
Dugandan State School	Dugandan	Scenic Rim	1917	1966		
Ebenezer State School	Ebenezer	Ipswich	1868	1957	27.66958°S 152.62701°E	Opened in 1868 as Seven Mile Creek State School . Renamed 1888 as Ebenezer State School. It closed in 1957. Located at 354–356 Ebenezer Road (opposite the junction with Turnbull Road).
Fairney View State School	Fairney View	Somerset	1896	1967	27.4937°S 152.6678°E	Located at 20–30 Randalls Road.
Fassifern State School	Fassifern	Scenic Rim	1879	1887		
Fassifern Station State School	near Kalbar	Scenic Rim	?	1888		Little is known about this school. It closed in 1888 and its students were transferred to Engelsburg State School (now Kalbar State School).
Fassifern Valley State School	Fassifern Valley	Scenic Rim	1906	1958	27.9697°S 152.6085°E	Located at 16 Tutin Road.
Flying Fox State School	Flying Fox (now Ferny Glen)	Scenic Rim	1920	1962	approx 28.0810°S 153.1561°E	Located on the western side of Upper Coomera Road near the Coomera River, now within the present-day boundaries of neighbouring Ferny Glen.
Fordsdale State School	Fordsdale	Lockyer Valley	1895	1937	27.7081°S 152.1285°E	1895 opened as Ma Ma Creek Upper Provisional School, 1906 renamed Fordsdale Provisional School, 1909 became Fordsdale State School. 1929 closed 1931 reopened, 1933 closed. Located at 1902 Gatton Clifton Road.
Fordsdale State School	Fordsdale	Lockyer Valley	1937	1939	27.7196°S 152.1193°E	1937 reopened in the Fordsdale School of Arts hall, 2085 Gatton Clifton Road.
Fordsdale State School	Fordsdale	Lockyer Valley	1939	1967	approx 27.7199°S 152.1211°E	1939 new school building near the School of Arts hall, approx 2085 Gatton Clifton Road.
Frazerview State School	Frazerview	Scenic Rim	1915	1975	27.9520°S 152.5569°E	Located at 420 Frazerview Road.
Fulham State School	Fulham, now Cressbrook	Somerset	1920	1953	27.0771°S 152.4209°E	Located at 372 Cressbrook Caboonbah Road (southern corner with Fulham Road), now in Cressbrook.
Glenapp State School	Running Creek	Scenic Rim	1901	1960	28.2656°S 152.9109°E	Glenapp Provisional School opened on 19 August 1901. On 1 January 1909, it became Glenapp State School. It closed on 9 December 1960. It was located on the eastern side of Running Creek Road south of the junction with Spring Creek Road.
Glen Cairn State School	Glen Cairn	Lockyer Valley	1926	1972	approx 27.6146°S 152.3394°E	Located on Glen Cairn Road.
Grantham Scrub State School	Grantham Scrub, now Veradilla	Lockyer Valley	1896	1950	27.59327°S 152.18507°E	Located at 119 Missouri Road (corner of Grantham Scrub Road).
Gregor's Creek State School	Gregor's Creek, now in Woolmar	Somerset	1896	1963	26.96012°S 152.44259°E	Located at 1095 Gregors Creek Road, now in the neighbouring locality of Woolmar.
Hidden Vale State School	Grandchester	Ipswich	1916	1943	27.7138°S 152.4707°E	Located at 779–799 Hiddenvale Road.
Ingoldsby State School	Ingoldsby	Lockyer Valley	1894	1974	27.7222°S 152.2616°E	1894 opened as Hessenburg Provisional School, 1909 became Hessenburg State School, 1916 renamed Ingoldsby State School. Locatedat 1128–1130 Ingoldsby Road.
Innisplain State School	Innisplain	Scenic Rim	1921	1962	28.1759°S 152.9038°E	Located on Innisplain Road.
Iredale State School	Iredale	Lockyer Valley	circa 1894	1916	27.57216°S 152.08628°E	Opened circa 1894 as Helidon Scrub Provisional School, 1909 became Helidon Scrub State School, 1916 relocated to a larger site in a new building (the original school building and site because Iredale School of Arts).
Iredale State School	Iredale	Lockyer Valley	1916	1975	27.5737°S 152.0910°E	1916 relocated to a larger site in a new building, circa 1944 renamed Iredale State School. Located at 646 Spa Water Road.
Jimna State School	Jimna	Somerset	1923	2009	26.6619°S 152.4623°E	Originally known as Monsildale State School, then later, Foxlowe State School. Building was moved from Monsildale. Renamed Jimna State School in 1926. It was at 21 School Road. The school's website was archived.
Junction View State School	Junction View	Lockyer Valley	1922	2010	27.8012°S 152.1886°E	Established in 1922 by relocating the buildings of Black Duck State School (opened 1910). Junction View State School was at 7 East Haldon Road. The school's website was archived.
Karrabin State School	Karrabin	Ipswich	1932	1958		
Kerry State School	Kerry	Scenic Rim	1884	1943	28.13551°S 153.03448°E	Located at 307 Kerry West Road (via Ward Lane).
Knapps Creek State School	Knapp Creek	Scenic Rim	1884	1910	approx 28.11514°S 152.89442°E	Knapps Creek Provisional School opened circa 1884. On 1 January 1909 it became Knapps Creek State School, but then closed in 1910. It was south of the confluence of Knapps Creek and Cannon Creek, near the present-day boundaries of the localities of Knapps Creek, Laravale and Tamrookum.
Laidley Central State School	Laidley	Lockyer Valley	1908	1998	27.6477°S 152.3929°E	Opened 1908 as Laidley Old Township Provisional School, in 1909 became Laidley Central State School. Located at 21–23 Hope Street.
Laidley North State School	Laidley North /Laidley	Lockyer Valley	1889	1998	27.6243°S 152.3955°E	Opened as Laidley North Mixed State School in 1889, renamed Laidley North State School in 1897. Located at 218–220 Patrick Street, now within Laidley. Laidley District State School now occupies the site.
Laidley South State School	Laidley	Lockyer Valley	1864	1983	27.6798°S 152.3740°E	Located on Mulgowie Road.
Laravale State School	Laravale	Scenic Rim	1900	2010	28.0926°S 152.9376°E	Opened in 1900 as Errisvale Provisional School, renamed in 1907 as Laravale. Located at 73–77 Christmas Creek Road.
Lark Hill State School	Lark Hill	Somerset	1907	1967	27.52671°S 152.60411°E	Mount Stradbrook Provisional School opened on 8 July 1907. In June 1908, it was renamed Lark Hill Provisional School. On 1 January 1909, it became Lark Hill State School. It closed on 28 July 1967. It was at 335 Larkhill Boundary Road.
Left Hand Branch State School	Lefthand Branch	Lockyer Valley	1899	1967	approx 27.76419°S 152.24941°E	Hillview Provisional School opened on 16 October 1899. On 1 January 1909, it became Hillview State School. In 1914, it was renamed Viewland State School. It closed in 1923, to reopen in 1924 as Left Hand Branch State School, which finally closed in 1967. It was on the western side of Lefthand Branch Road, south of the junction with Reibstein Gully Road. Note the slightly different spelling of the locality name and the school name.
Limestone Ridges State School	Limestone Ridges	Scenic Rim	1884	1974	27.8301°S 152.7295°E	Located at 335 Limestone Ridges Road.
Lockyer Upper State School	Upper Lockyer, now in Lockyer	Lockyer Valley	1939	1968	27.5022°S 152.0717°E	Also known as Upper Lockyer State School. Located on the western side of Murphys Creek Road at the junction with Lockyer Siding Road. It is now within the locality boundaries of Lockyer.
Merryvale State School	Merryvale	Scenic Rim	1889	1961	approx 27.80094°S 152.47375°E	Originally opened as St. John's Creek Provisional School. It was also known as Franklyn Vale State School in the period 1906–1915. It opened and closed a number of times in its early history. In 1922, it was moved back to Merryvale, reopening on 15 May 1922 as Merryvale State School. It celebrated its 50th jubilee on 7 August 1947. It closed again in 1950, reopened, then finally closed in 1961. It was on the north side of Greys Plains Road.
Middle Undullah State School	Undullah	Scenic Rim	1921	1922		Little information available about this school.
Milbong State School	Milbong	Scenic Rim	1874	1965	27.8843°S 152.7275°E	Originally known as Blantyre One Eye Waterhole State School. Located at 2616 Ipswich Boonah Road (corner Milbong Road).
Milford State School	Milford	Scenic Rim	1886	1984	28.0250°S 152.7054°E	Located at 382 Milford Road. The school building still exists and is used as a private home.
Milora State School	Milora	Scenic Rim	1873	1962	approx 27.8526°S 152.6759°E	Located near the north-west corner of Munbilla Road and Goames Road.
Monsildale State School	Monsildale	Somerset	c.1913?	1961		May have closed and reopened as the building was moved to Jimna (Foxlowe) in 1923.
Moogerah State School	Moogerah	Scenic Rim	1908	1962	28.0692°S 152.5321°E	Located at 1601 Lake Moogerah Road.
Moogerah Dam State School	Moogerah	Scenic Rim	1959	1961		The Moogerah Dam was under construction between 1959 and 1961.
Moorang State School	Moorang	Scenic Rim	1894	1920	approx 27.9153°S 152.4615°E	Located on the southern side of Logan Lane.
Moore State School	Moore	Somerset	1904	2007	26.8915°S 152.2921°E	The school occupied two sites across the road from one another at 29–31 Linville Road and 1 School Street.
Morton Vale State School	Morton Vale	Lockyer Valley	1914	1981	27.5005°S 152.39084°E	Located at 10 Morton Vale School Road. As at January 2021, the school building is still standing.
Mount Barney State School	Mount Barney	Scenic Rim	1901	1962	28.2412°S 152.7651°E	Located on a bend in the Mount Barney Road.
Mount Beppo State School	Mount Beppo	Somerset	1893	1972	27.1321°S 152.4538°E	Located at 13 German Reserve Road.
Mount Berryman State School	Mount Berryman	Lockyer Valley	1886	1977	27.7088°S 152.3280°E	Located at 72 Mount Berryman Road.
Mount Byron State School	Mount Byron	Somerset	1919	1930		
Mount Campbell State School	Flagstone Creek	Lockyer Valley	1891	1978	27.6355°S 152.0584°E	Located at 35 Mount Campbell Road.
Mount Esk Pocket State School	Crossdale	Somerset	1911	1967	27.17507°S 152.49080°E	Located on the north-eastern corner of the junction of two now-unnamed roads; this area now being inaccessible to the public since the construction of the Wivenhoe Dam.
Mount Forbes State School	Mount Forbes	Ipswich	1896	1948	27.7388°S 152.6152°E	Located at 222 Mount Forbes School Road.
Mount French State School	Mount French	Scenic Rim	1900	circa 1925	approx 28.002°S 152.634°E	
Mount Gipps State School	Mount Gipps	Scenic Rim	1913	1954	28.3220°S 152.9915°E	Located at 220 Mount Gipps Road.
Mount Mort State School	Mount Mort	Lockyer Valley	1904	1959	27.80248°S 152.42483°E	Opened 1904 as Gehrkevale School, renamed 1917 Mount Mort. Located at 4 Alpers Road.
Mount Walker Lower State School	Mount Walker	Scenic Rim	1923	1945	27.7051°S 152.5372°E	Located at 286–294 Mount Walker West Road.
Mount Walker State School	Mount Walker	Scenic Rim	1878	1967	27.7805°S 152.5355°E	Located at 1775 Rosewood Warrill View Road on a 25-acre (10 ha) site.
Mulgowie State School	Mulgowie	Lockyer Valley	1877	1997	27.7374°S 152.3622°E	Originally known as Burnside until 1919. Located on Mulgowie School Road.
Murrumba State School	Lake Wivenhoe	Somerset	1910	1964	approx 27.1995°S 152.4894°E	Located on a section of Murrumba Road that no longer exists due to the construction of the Wivenhoe Dam).
Nindooinbah State School	Nindooinbah	Scenic Rim	1913	1965	28.07461°S 153.04834°E	Located at 540 Nindooinbah Estate Road.
Obum Obum State School	Obum Obum	Scenic Rim	1899	1946	27.91268°S 152.65588°E	Located at 210 Roberts Road (north-east corner of Obum Obum Road).
Palen Creek State School	Palen Creek	Scenic Rim	1893	1962	approx 28.2774°S 152.8002°E	Located near the Palen Creek School Road junction with the Mount Lindesay Highway.
Pine Mountain State School	Pine Mountain	Ipswich	1864	1963	27.5446°S 152.7117°E	Located at 820–838 Pine Mountain Road.
Plainland State School	Plainland	Lockyer Valley	1886	1966	27.5718°S 152.4162°E	On a 10-acre (4.0 ha) site at 3 Victor Court.
Postman's Ridge State School	Postmans Ridge	Lockyer Valley	1878	1937	approx 27.53394°S 152.06179°E	Located on the northern side of Murphys Creek Road.
Purga State School	Purga	Ipswich	1871	1967		
Purga Aboriginal State School	Purga	Ipswich				There are references to this school in Queensland State Archives. Needs further research.
Radford State School	Radford	Scenic Rim	1933	1946	approx 27.8543°S 152.6407°E	Located on Radford Road.
Railway Camp Provisional School	via Beaudesert	Scenic Rim	1927	1929		Opened 23/8/27 and closed 2/10/29. Was located on section 2 of the Kyogle line construction.
Ravensbourne State school	Ravensbourne	Lockyer Valley	1891	1969	27.3595°S 152.1609°E	Located at the end of Ravensbourne School Road off Post Office Road.
Rockmount State School	Rockmount	Lockyer Valley	1899	1965	27.6750°S 152.0397°E	At 122 Rockmount Road.
Rockside State School	Rockside	Lockyer Valley	1902	1921		Rockside Provisional School on 2 June 1902 with Henry Arthur Trone as the first teacher. On 1 January 1909, it became Rockside State School. It closed on 5 April 1921. The school building was relocated to Ropeley East.
Rockside State School	Rockside	Lockyer Valley	1936	1952	27.69343°S 152.28392°E	On 8 July 1936, Rockside State School re-opened in a new building. At 1131 Ropeley Rockside Road.
Ropeley East State School	Ropeley	Lockyer Valley	1915	1955		
Rosevale State School	Rosevale	Scenic Rim	1884	2009	27.8466°S 152.4824°E	At 628 Sellars Road (corner of Tierneys Bridge Road). The school's website was archived.
Sandy Gully State School	Biarra	Somerset	1925	1959	27.1238°S 152.3303°E	Located at approx 22 Wells Station Road.
Sarabah Provisional School	Sarabah	Scenic Rim	1892	1899		
Scrub Creek State School	Scrub Creek	Somerset	circa 1933	1955	27.0402°S 152.4080°E	Located at 238 Scrub Creek Road.
Sheep Station Creek State School	Sheep Station Creek	Somerset	1884	1941	26.8738°S 152.5392°E	Originally opened as Kilcoy Provisional School in 1884, which was changed to Sheep Station Creek Provisional School in 1893 as a result of a school with a similar name in Kilcoy township opening in 1892. It became Sheep Station Creek State School in 1909 and closed soon after that, but opened again in 1913 before closing permanently in 1941. Located on Kilcoy Murgon Road.
Silverdale State School	Silverdale	Scenic Rim	1910	1963	27.8875°S 152.6114°E	Located at 5382 Cunningham Highway.
Somerset State School	Mount Kilcoy	Somerset	1915	1943		Opened as a Provisional School; became a State School in 1917
Somerset Dam State School	Somerset Dam	Somerset	1936	2000	27.1178°S 152.5505°E	Formerly Silverton SS until the 1960s and Somerset State School. Located at the end of First Avenue.
Spring Park State School	Stockyard or Mount Whitestone	Lockyer Valley	1918	1933		
Springdale State School		Lockyer Valley	circa 1882	1909		Opened circa 1882 as Clarendon Provisional School, became Springdale State School on 1 January 1909, but closed later in 1909. Its precise location is not known but it was in the vicinity of the intersection of (present day) Adare, Lake Clarendon and Spring Creek.
Stanley River State School	Hazeldean	Somerset	1898	1951	approx 27.0068°S 152.5538°E	The school was on the eastern side of the Esk Kilcoy Road until 1951 when it was relocated further south to be on higher ground in anticipation of the indundation resulting from the completion of the Somerset Dam.
Stanley River State School	Hazeldean	Somerset	1951	1975	27.0107°S 152.5526°E	Relocated to 3856 Esk Kilcoy Road.
Summerholm State School	Summerholm	Lockyer Valley	1889	1937	27.61797°S 152.44964°E	Summer Hill Provisional School opened on 2 September 1889 with 13 students under teacher Miss M. Hanley. On 1 January 1909, it became Summer Hill State School. It was on a 10-acre (4.0 ha) site at 61 Summerholm Road. In 1911, the school committee wanted to have the school relocated to a more central localition as the population of the district had moved further to the north.
Summerholm State School	Summerholm	Lockyer Valley	1937	1955	27.60842°S 152.45015°E	In 1937, a new school building was erected in a "central location" and officially opened on Saturday 17 April 1937 by Ted Maher, the Member of the Queensland Legislative Assembly for West Moreton. In 1944, it was renamed Summerholm State School. It closed circa 1955. It was at 51 Summerholm Road, approximately 1 kilometre (0.62 mi) north of the school's previous location.
Tabooba State School	Tabooba	Scenic Rim	1911	1942	approx 28.13474°S 152.96172°E	Tabooba State School opened on 24 July 1911. It closed on 24 August 1942. It was on a 1-acre (0.40 ha) site on the southern corner of Christmas Creek Road and Tramway Road.
Tallegalla State School	Tallegalla	Ipswich	1879	1992	27.59436°S 152.56469°E	At 2–6 Tallegalla Two Tree Hill Road (corner of Tallegalla Road). Listed on the Queensland Heritage Register.
Tamborine State School	Tamborine	Scenic Rim & Logan	1876	1970	27.8767°S 153.1250°E	1876 opened as Tambourine Provisional School, 1905 relocated, 1909 became Tambourine State School, 1926 renamed Tamborine. Since 1905 at 2680–2726 Waterford Tamborine Road, now Tamborine School Park.
Tamborine North State School	Tamborine Mountain	Scenic Rim	1883	1966		
Tarome State School	Tarome	Scenic Rim	1915	1992	27.9904°S 152.4634°E	Located at 972 Tarome Road.
Templin State School	Templin	Scenic Rim	1892	1974	27.9738°S 152.6504°E	Located at 397 Boonah-Fassifern Road. The site is now the Templin Historical Museum and the school building is used as its office.
Tent Hill Upper State School	Upper Tenthill	Lockyer Valley	1877	2002	27.6574°S 152.2265°E	Located at 51 Upper Tenthill School Road.
Teviot State School	Croftby	Scenic Rim	1892	1966	28.1415°S 152.6075°E	Original proposed name that was never used was Croftly State School. At the corner of Carneys Creek Road and Broad Gully Road.
Teviot Junction Provisional School		Scenic Rim	1879–1880?	c.1899?		Teviot Junction refers to the confluence of Teviot Brook with the Logan River in present-day Cedar Grove
Teviotville State School	Teviotville	Scenic Rim	1899	1981	27.9495°S 152.6850°E	Originally known as Teviot railway Station Provisional School and then became Teviotville in 1912. Located on the south-west corner of Hoya Road and Haag Road.
Thorndale State School	Thorndale	Scenic Rim	1915	1924	28.6896°S 151.8429°E	Thorndale State School opened in 1915 on a 5-acre (2.0 ha) site off Boyce Road. It closed in 1924, after which it was moved to Spring Creek, Stanthorpe and renamed Greenlands State School.
Thorndale State School	Thorndale	Scenic Rim	1946	1964	28.69610°S 151.85647°E	A second Thorndale State School opened on 18 February 1946 and closed on 31 December 1964. It was at 7 Nicholson Road .
Townson State School	Townson	Lockyer Valley	1894	1964		
Tylerville State School	Tylerville (now Palen Creek)	Scenic Rim	1909	1962	28.3157°S 152.7761°E	Located on Mount Lindesay Highway.
Villeneuve State School	Villeneuve	Somerset	1902	1960		
Washpool State School	Washpool	Scenic Rim	1924	1957		
West Haldon State School	West Haldon	Lockyer Valley	1896	1949	approx 27.7838°S 152.0990°E	Located on the south-east corner of Gatton Clifton Road and MacGinley Road.
Winya State School	Winya / Sandy Creek	Somerset	1918	1960	26.9293°S 152.6073°E	Closed temporarily from 1944 to 1948. The school was on a five-acre (2.0 ha) site on the north-east corner of the D'Aguilar Highway and Sandy Creek Road, now in neighbouring Sandy Creek.
Witheren State School	Witheren	Scenic Rim	1899	1965	28.0515°S 153.1791°E	Originally known as Witheren Mixed State School. Located at 97 Upper Coomera Road.
Wivenhoe State School	Wivenhoe	Somerset	1876	1962		
Wonglepong State School	Wonglepong	Scenic Rim	1884	1935	27.96994°S 153.16294°E	Opened in 1884 as Caningera (Creek) Provisional School and closed in 1893. Opened and closed again both in 1885 and 1887 as Canungra Creek Provisional School. Opened again as Canungera Lower Provisional School in 1898, becoming a State School in 1909. In 1915 it was renamed Wangalpong State School and changed finally to Wonglepong in 1928. The school was within the present-day Henry Franklin Family Park on Mundoolun Connection Road. A commemorative plaque in the park marks the school's exact site, using the name Caningera School.
Woodlands State School	Woodlands	Lockyer Valley	1897	1975	27.6206°S 152.2804°E	Located at 714 Woodlands Road.
Woolmar State School	Woolmar	Somerset	1894	1941	26.9458°S 152.5224°E	Woolmar Provisional School opened on 8 March 1894. On 1 January 1909, it became Woolmar State School. It had temporary closures in 1931 and 1940, closing permanently on 14 April 1941. It was at 5615 D'Aguilar Highway.
Woolooman State School	Woolooman	Scenic Rim	1908	1937		Woolooman Provisional School opened on 9 March 1908. On 1 January it became Woolooman State School. It closed in 1913 due to low attendances. The school re-opened on 21 Aug 1933 as Woolooman State School. It closed permanently in 1937.
Wyaralong State School	Wyaralong	Scenic Rim	1924	1965	approx 27.9430°S 152.7584°E	Located south of the (now) Old Beaudesert Road.
Yednia State School	Monsildale / Sheep Station Creek	Somerset	1911	1946		

== Private schools ==
=== Catholic schools ===
In Queensland, Catholic primary schools are usually (but not always) linked to a parish. Prior to the 1970s, most schools were founded by religious institutes, but with the decrease in membership of these institutes, together with major reforms inside the church, lay teachers and administrators began to take over the schools, a process which completed by approximately 1990.

Within the region, schools are administered by the Catholic Education Office, Archdiocese of Brisbane, and supported by the Queensland Catholic Education Commission, which is responsible for coordinating administration, curriculum and policy across the Catholic school system. Preference for enrolment is given to Catholic students from the parish or local area, although non-Catholic students are admitted if room is available.

Name	Suburb	LGA	M/F/Co-ed	Years	Opened	Coords	Notes
All Saints' Primary School	Boonah	Scenic Rim	Co-ed	P–6	1956	28.0003°S 152.6864°E	At 15 Oliver Street.
McAuley College	Beaudesert	Scenic Rim	Co-ed	7–12	2017	27.9897°S 153.0118°E	At 30 Oakland Way.
Our Lady of Good Counsel School	Gatton	Lockyer Valley	Co-ed	P–6	1917	27.5582°S 152.2716°E	At 20 Maitland Street.
Sophia College	Plainland	Lockyer Valley	Co-ed	7–12	2021	27.5565°S 152.4226°E	At 56 Otto Road (corner of Gehrke Road).
St Brigid's Primary School	Rosewood	Ipswich	Co-ed	P–6	1922	27.6419°S 152.5949°E	At 11 Railway Street.
St Mary's Primary School	Beaudesert	Scenic Rim	Co-ed	P–6	1901	27.9905°S 152.9913°E	At 1 Bromelton Street.
St Mary's School	Laidley	Lockyer Valley	Co-ed	P–6	1912	27.6341°S 152.3916°E	At 37 John Street South.

=== Independent schools ===
Most independent schools cater for students from preparatory to year 12.

Name	Suburb	LGA	M/F/Co-ed	Years	Category	Opened	Coords	Notes
Faith Lutheran College	Plainland	Lockyer Valley	Co-ed	7–12	Lutheran	1999	27.5680°S 152.4161°E	At 5 Faith Avenue.
Peace Lutheran Primary School	Gatton	Lockyer Valley	Co-ed	P–6	Lutheran	1982	27.5575°S 152.2743°E	At 36 East Street.
Tamborine Mountain College	Tamborine Mountain	Scenic Rim	Co-ed	P–12	Independent (no religious affiliation)	1995	27.9272°S 153.1763°E	At 80 Beacon Road.
The Kooralbyn International School	Kooralbyn	Scenic Rim	Co-ed	P–12	Independent (no religious affiliation)	1985	28.0939°S 152.8447°E	At 62-80 Ogilvie Place.

=== Defunct private schools ===
Name	Suburb	LGA	Category	Opened	Closed	Coords	Notes
BoysTown	Beaudesert	Scenic Rim	Catholic	1961	2004		In Telemon Road. Operated by the De La Salle brothers to care for orphaned, neglected, or wayward boys.

== See also ==
- List of schools in Queensland
