= Rockmount, Queensland =

Rockmount
- Suburb
- Interactive map of Rockmount
- Coordinates: 27.6763°S 152.0363°E
- Country: Australia
- State: Queensland
- LGA: Lockyer Valley Region
- Location: 22.8 km (14.2 mi) SE of Toowoomba; 36.8 km (22.9 mi) SW of Gatton; 131 km (81 mi) WSW of Brisbane

Government
  - State electorate: Lockyer
  - Federal division: Wright

Area
  - Total: 33.3 km^{2} (12.9 sq mi)

Population
  - Total: 82 (2021 census)
  - Density: 2.462/km^{2} (6.38/sq mi)
- Time zone: UTC+10:00 (AEST)
- Postcode: 4344
Suburbs around Rockmount
Upper Flagstone	Upper Flagstone	Stockyard
Preston	Rockmount	Egypt
Ramsay	Fordsdale	Fordsdale

Rockmount is a rural locality in the Lockyer Valley Region, Queensland, Australia. In the 2021 census, Rockmount had a population of 82 people.

== Geography ==
Deverton is a neighbourhood in the south-east of the locality (27.6833°S 152.05°E).

Rockmount has the following mountains:

- Mount Campbell (27.6675°S 152.0134°E) 722 metres (2,369 ft)
- Mount Ridgley (27.7015°S 152.0268°E) 666 metres (2,185 ft)

== History ==
Rockmount Provisional School opened on 31 January 1899 but closed in early 1902. On 1 February 1904 the school reopened and on 1 January 1909 became Rockmount State School. It closed in 1920, but reopened on 26 November 1928. It closed finally on 24 January 1965. It was at 122 Rockmount Road (27.6750°S 152.0397°E).

== Demographics ==
In the 2016 census, Rockmount had a population of 87 people.

In the 2021 census, Rockmount had a population of 82 people.

== Education ==
There are no schools in Rockmount. The nearest government primary schools are:

- Flagstone Creek State School in Flagstone Creek to the north-east
- Mount Whitestone State School in Mount Whitestone to the east
- Ramsay State School in neighbouring Ramsay to the south-west
- Middle Ridge State School in Middle Ridge, Toowoomba, to the north-west

The nearest government secondary school is Centenary Heights State High School in Centenary Heights, Toowoomba.
