= Ramsay, Queensland =

Ramsay
- Suburb
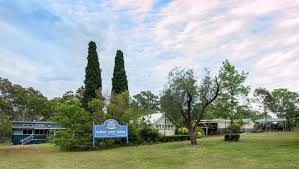
- Ramsay State School, 2024

- Interactive map of Ramsay
- Coordinates: 27.7333°S 151.9833°E
- Country: Australia
- State: Queensland
- LGA: Toowoomba Region
- Location: 23.4 km (14.5 mi) S of Toowoomba CBD; 38.0 km (23.6 mi) N of Clifton; 149 km (93 mi) W of Brisbane

Government
  - State electorate: Condamine
  - Federal division: Groom

Area
  - Total: 66.3 km^{2} (25.6 sq mi)

Population
  - Total: 369 (2021 census)
  - Density: 5.566/km^{2} (14.415/sq mi)
- Time zone: UTC+10:00 (AEST)
- Postcode: 4352
Suburbs around Ramsay
Hodgson Vale	Preston	Rockmount
Cambooya	Ramsay	Fordsdale
East Greenmount	Budgee	West Haldon

Ramsay is a rural locality in the Toowoomba Region, Queensland, Australia. In the 2021 census, Ramsay had a population of 369 people.

== Geography ==
The Great Dividing Range passes through Ramsay, entering from the north from Preston and exiting to the south-east (Budgee / West Haldon). The terrain to the east of the range is mountainous with the following named peaks:

- Darling Point (27.7428°S 152.0203°E) 634 metres (2,080 ft)
- Hay Peak (27.7131°S 151.9913°E) 736 metres (2,415 ft)
- Mount Allen (27.7229°S 152.0181°E) 639 metres (2,096 ft)
- Mount Boodgee (27.7337°S 152.0585°E) 574 metres (1,883 ft)
- Mount Neale (27.7026°S 152.0017°E) 684 metres (2,244 ft)
- Mount Prosper (27.7426°S 152.0014°E) 721 metres (2,365 ft)
- Paddy Point (27.7282°S 152.0108°E) 664 metres (2,178 ft)
- Prosperity Point (27.7273°S 152.0392°E) 647 metres (2,123 ft)

Within the locality, the range is a watershed with the creeks that rise to the east of the range contributing to the North East Coast drainage basin which enter the Coral Sea, while the creeks that rise to the west of the range are ultimately tributaries of the Condamine River, part of the Murray Darling drainage basin.

The terrain in the locality to the west of the range is still hilly but overall flatter and lower (down to 500 metres (1,600 ft) above sea level). The land use in the east of the locality is grazing on native vegetation, while the land use in the west of the locality is a mix of grazing and crop growing, the latter generally occurring closer to the creeks.

== History ==
The locality is named after Robert Ramsay, a pastoralist and politician. He was one of the owners of Eton Vale station and leased the Rosalie Plains pastoral run. He was a member of both the Queensland Legislative Assembly and the Queensland Legislative Council.

Ramsay State School opened on 3 October 1881.

== Demographics ==
In the 2011 census, Ramsay had a population of 310 people.

In the 2016 census, Ramsay had a population of 348 people.

In the 2021 census, Ramsay had a population of 369 people.

== Economy ==
There are a number of homesteads in the locality, including:

- Alpine Grange (27.7233°S 151.9954°E)
- Alpine Grange (27.7233°S 151.9954°E)
- Arinya (27.7268°S 151.9520°E)
- Laughma (27.7307°S 151.9645°E)
- Mount Prosper (27.7270°S 152.0013°E)
- Mountain View (27.7208°S 151.9278°E)
- Orourkes House (27.6913°S 151.9940°E)
- Venvale (27.7188°S 151.9392°E)

== Education ==
Ramsay State School is a government primary (Prep-6) school for boys and girls at 173 Ramsay School Road (27.7216°S 151.9625°E). In 2018, the school had an enrolment of 46 students with 5 teachers (3 full-time equivalent) and 7 non-teaching staff (3 full-time equivalent).

There are no secondary schools in Ramsay. The nearest government secondary schools are Centenary Heights State High School in Centenary Heights and Harristown State High School in Harristown, both suburbs of Toowoomba to the north, and Clifton State High School in Clifton to the south.
