= Egypt, Queensland =

Egypt
- Suburb
- Interactive map of Egypt
- Coordinates: 27.6761°S 152.0977°E
- Country: Australia
- State: Queensland
- LGA: Lockyer Valley Region
- Location: 28.7 km (17.8 mi) SW of Gatton; 49.5 km (30.8 mi) SE of Toowoomba; 120 km (75 mi) WSW of Brisbane

Government
  - State electorate: Lockyer
  - Federal division: Wright

Area
  - Total: 14.8 km^{2} (5.7 sq mi)

Population
  - Total: 8 (2021 census)
  - Density: 0.54/km^{2} (1.40/sq mi)
- Time zone: UTC+10:00 (AEST)
- Postcode: 4344
Suburbs around Egypt
Stockyard	Flagstone Creek	Flagstone Creek
Stockyard	Egypt	Mount Whitestone
Rockmount	Fordsdale	Fordsdale

Egypt is a rural locality in the Lockyer Valley Region, Queensland, Australia. In the 2021 census, Egypt had a population of 8 people.

== History ==
In June 1912, a public meeting called for the establishment of a school as there were about 17 children who would attend. John Renton offered 1 acre (0.40 ha) of his land for the school. However, there is no evidence that the school was ever established.

== Demographics ==
In the 2016 census, Egypt had a population of 15 people.

In the 2021 census, Egypt had a population of 8 people.

== Education ==
There are no schools in Egypt. The nearest government primary schools are Flagstone Creek State School in neighbouring Flagstone Creek to the north and Mount Whitestone State School in neighbouring Mount Whitestone to the east. The nearest government secondary schools are Lockyer District State High School in Gatton to the north-east and Centenary Heights State High School in Centenary Heights, Tooowoomba, to the north-west.
