= Silver Ridge, Queensland =

Silver Ridge
- Suburb
- Interactive map of Silver Ridge
- Coordinates: 27.6052°S 152.0208°E
- Country: Australia
- State: Queensland
- LGA: Lockyer Valley Region
- Location: 6.3 km (3.9 mi) SE of Centenary Heights; 9.4 km (5.8 mi) SE of Toowoomba CBD; 36.4 km (22.6 mi) WSW of Gatton; 126 km (78 mi) W of Brisbane CBD

Government
  - State electorate: Lockyer
  - Federal division: Wright

Area
  - Total: 12.3 km^{2} (4.7 sq mi)

Population
  - Total: 188 (2021 census)
  - Density: 15.28/km^{2} (39.59/sq mi)
- Time zone: UTC+10:00 (AEST)
- Postcode: 4352
Suburbs around Silver Ridge
Rangeville	Blanchview	Derrymore
Middle Ridge	Silver Ridge	Flagstone Creek
Upper Flagstone	Upper Flagstone	Flagstone Creek

Silver Ridge is a rural locality in the Lockyer Valley Region, Queensland, Australia. In the 2021 census, Silver Ridge had a population of 188 people.

== Geography ==
Rocky Knob is a mountain in the south of the locality (27.6140°S 152.0371°E), rising to a peak of 570 metres (1,870 ft) above sea level.

The land use is predominantly grazing on native vegetation. Most of the residential land use is in the south-west of the locality along Flagstone Creek Road and Blanchview Road.

== History ==
The locality was named on 11 May 1985 and bounded on 18 February 2000.

== Demographics ==
In the 2016 census, Silver Ridge had a population of 177 people.

In the 2021 census, Silver Ridge had a population of 188 people.

== Education ==
There are no schools in Silver Ridge. The nearest government primary school is Gabbinar State School in Centenary Heights, a suburb of Toowoomba, to the north-west. The nearest government secondary school is Centenary Heights State High School, also in Centenary Heights.
