= Upper Flagstone, Queensland =

Upper Flagstone
- Suburb
- Interactive map of Upper Flagstone
- Coordinates: 27.6325°S 152.0016°E
- Country: Australia
- State: Queensland
- LGA: Lockyer Valley Region
- Location: 15.0 km (9.3 mi) SE of Toowoomba CBD; 32.5 km (20.2 mi) WSW of Gatton; 124 km (77 mi) WSW of Brisbane

Government
  - State electorate: Lockyer
  - Federal division: Wright

Area
  - Total: 29.8 km^{2} (11.5 sq mi)

Population
  - Total: 191 (2021 census)
  - Density: 6.409/km^{2} (16.60/sq mi)
- Time zone: UTC+10:00 (AEST)
- Postcode: 4344
Suburbs around Upper Flagstone
Middle Ridge	Silver Ridge	Silver Ridge
Preston	Upper Flagstone	Flagstone Creek
Preston	Rockmount	Stockyard

Upper Flagstone is a rural locality in the Lockyer Valley Region, Queensland, Australia. In the 2021 census, Upper Flagstone had a population of 191 people.

== Geography ==
Lying just east of the Great Dividing Range, thelocality is dominated by an east/west valley containing Flagstone Creek. The valley remains mostly covered in natural vegetation. Flagstone Creek Conservation Park is in the south-east of the locality (27.6422°S 152.0339°E).

The land use is mostly grazing on native vegetation with some crop growing and rural residential housing.

== History ==
In 1840, the penal colony at Moreton Bay was being prepared to be turned into a free settlement (which ultimately became the city of Brisbane). As there was settlement already occurring on the Darling Downs, there was a need for Lieutenant Owen Gorman, the last commandant of the penal colony, to find a wagon route between the two locations, but the obstacle was the mountains of the Great Dividing Range. There was a route already known at Cunninghams Gap but it was not able to be used by a wagon. A convict John Sterry Baker had escaped from the penal colony in 1826 and had lived among the Goomburra Aboriginal people in the Lockyer Valley area and walked with them on a track to the top of the range. Having returned to the penal colony in 1840, Baker told Gorman of the track up the range and modified an Irish jaunting car to test as a wagon on the route. Together Gorman and Baker ascended the range with their wagon on 17 October 1840 arriving at Eton Vale. Despite the fact that Gorman did not discover the route, it nonetheless became known as Gorman's Gap Road. The route which runs between Upper Flagstone in the west and Flagstone Creek in the east was marked by blazing a line of trees. It became the first gazetted road in Queensland. Today, the road no longer officially exists and is overgrown but can still be followed. There are three monuments along the route, one at each end and the other along the route at Camel's Hump where Gorman took his compass bearing.

== Demographics ==
In the 2011 census, Upper Flagstone was included within the count for neighbouring Preston which had a combined population of 763 people.

In the 2016 census, Upper Flagstone had a population of 171 people.

In the 2021 census, Upper Flagstone had a population of 191 people.

== Education ==
There are no schools in Upper Flagstone. The nearest government primary schools are Middle Ridge State School in neighbouring Middle Ridge to the north-west, Gabbinbar State School in Centenary Heights to the north-west, and Flagstone Creek State School in neighbouring Flagstone Creek to the east. The nearest government secondary school is Centenary Heights State High School in Centenary Heights.
