= Preston, Queensland =

Preston
- Suburb
- Coordinates: 27.6652°S 151.9677°E
- Country: Australia
- State: Queensland
- City: Toowoomba
- LGA(s): Toowoomba Region; Lockyer Valley Region
- Location: 11.9 km (7.4 mi) SSE of Toowoomba CBD; 46.6 km (29.0 mi) WSW of Gatton; 135 km (84 mi) W of Brisbane

Government
  - State electorate(s): Condamine
  - Federal division(s): Groom

Area
  - Total: 18.9 km^{2} (7.3 sq mi)

Population
  - Total(s): 644 (2021 census)
  - Density: 34.07/km^{2} (88.25/sq mi)
- Time zone: UTC+10:00 (AEST)
- Postcode: 4352
Suburbs around Preston
Kearneys Spring	Middle Ridge	Upper Flagstone
Top Camp	Preston	Rockmount
Hodgson Vale	Hodgson Vale	Ramsay

Preston is a rural locality split between the Toowoomba Region and the Lockyer Valley Region in Queensland, Australia. In the 2021 census, Preston had a population of 644 people.

== Geography ==
Preston is located to the south-east of Toowoomba and to the east of Hodgson Vale.

== History ==
Prestons Provisional School opened in 1896. It became Prestons State School on 1 Jan 1909. In 1925 due to low student numbers, it initially became a half time school in conjunction with Eton Vale State School (a teacher was shared between the two schools) but then closed later in 1925. In April 1930 the school reopened with a slightly changed name Preston State School. It finally closed in 1947. The school was located approximately at 13 Nass Road (27.6561°S 151.9723°E).

In 2006, St David's Anglican Church was relocated from Oman Ama to 330 Preston Boundary Road in Preston (27.6486°S 151.9634°E), where it is used as a wedding chapel at Preston Manor & Village Chapel. The church was dedicated on 31 July 1905 in Oman Ama. It closed in 1972 but reopened on 28 July 1985. Its final closure on 30 July 2002 was approved by Assistant Bishop Nolan.

== Demographics ==
In the 2016 census, Preston had a population of 614 people.

In the 2021 census, Preston had a population of 644 people.

== Education ==
There are no schools in Preston. The nearest government primary schools are Middle Ridge State School in neighbouring Middle Ridge to the north, Vale View State School in Vale View to the west, and Ramsay State School in neighbouring Ramsay to the south. The nearest government secondary school is Centenary Heights State High School in Centenary Heights to the north.

== Amenities ==
The Middle Ridge branch of the Queensland Country Women's Association meets at 95 Preston-Boundary Road (27.6362°S 151.9494°E).
