= Toowoomba Golf Club Middle Ridge =

Golf club in Australia

Coordinates: 27.6021°S 151.9751°E

- Interactive map of Toowoomba Golf Club Middle Ridge

Club information
- Tournaments: Australian Open

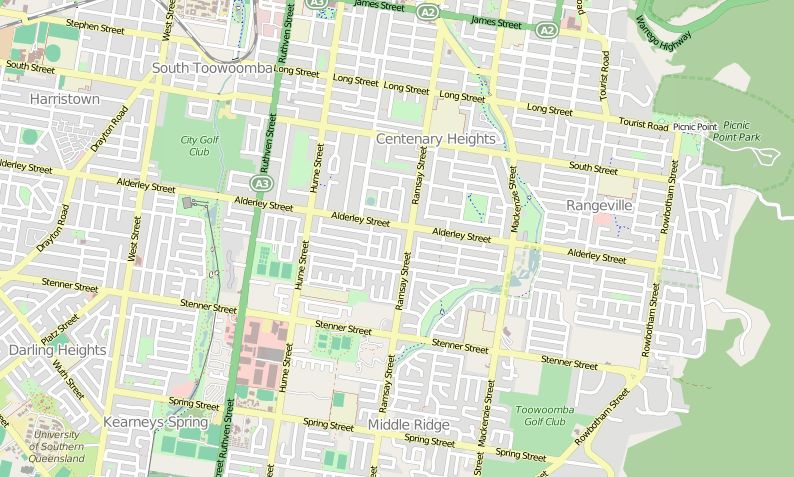
Map showing the location of the two Toowoomba Golf Clubs

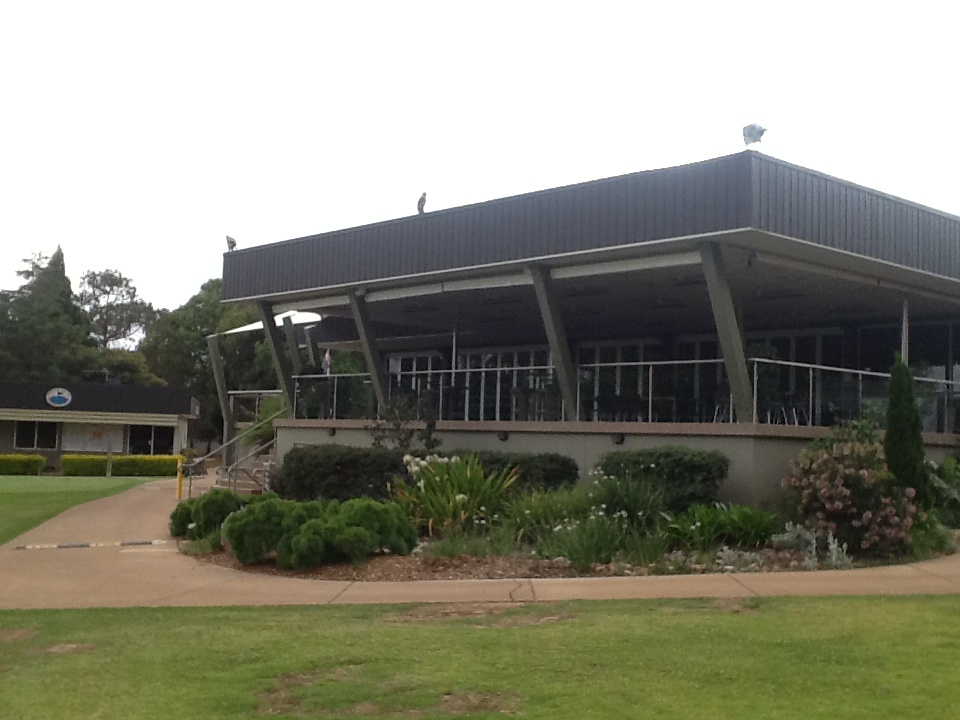
Clubhouse deck

The Toowoomba Golf Club Middle Ridge is one of two golf clubs in Toowoomba, Queensland, Australia; the other being City Golf Club Toowoomba. Toowoomba Golf Club is situated in the suburb of Middle Ridge, and its address is 235–323 Rowbotham Street.

Toowoomba Golf Club, Middle Ridge, is a sports club with an 18-hole championship golf course and its clubhouse includes areas for functions, one being a private room and the other a deck with views across the course.

The clubhouse hosts "Ridges" – a 150-seat restaurant. The clubhouse bar and deck overlook the kikuyu fairways that are bordered by 100-year-old gums and camphor laurel trees which surround the 18th green.

The course features a challenging par 72 (5,953 metres), 18 hole layout that has hosted numerous major championships and international golfing visitors including Greg Norman, Gene Sarazen, Gary Player, Bobby Locke, and Bruce Crampton.

== History ==
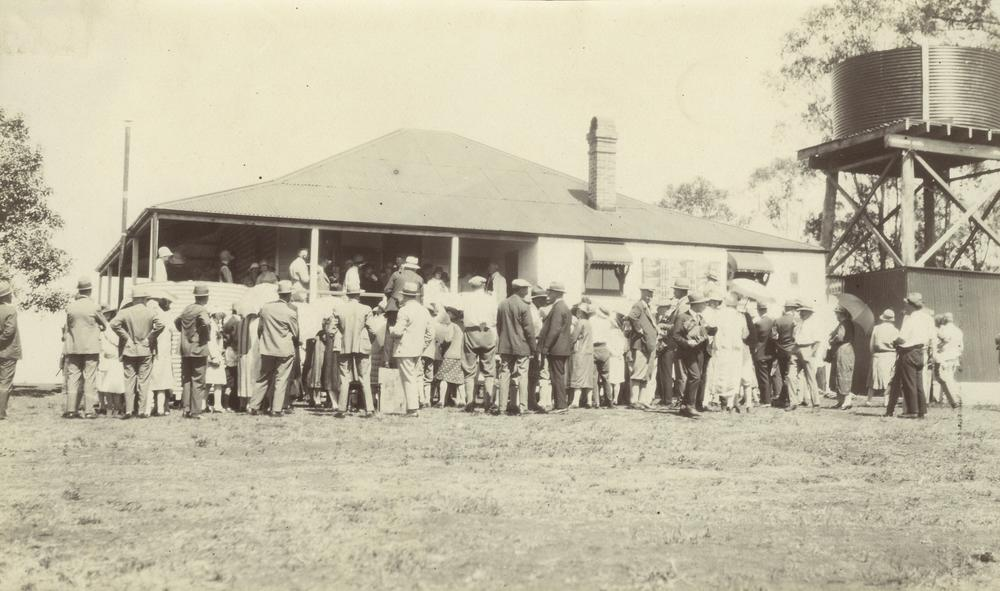
Large crowd at the opening of the golf clubhouse, 1926

The Toowoomba Golf Club was established in 1896. It is the second oldest golf club in Queensland – Townsville is 3 years older.

The club has had no fewer than five different locations within the Toowoomba City boundary. Originally the club occupied land on Drayton Road in Harristown, then on a block of land in the area now best known as St Vincent's Hospital, then relocated to the now Toowoomba Turf Club land and after much negotiation found a more permanent home in Willowburn where Bailey Henderson Hospital is located. In approximately 1924 it was decided that the club needed more permanency and therefore members negotiated both the purchase and acceptance of gifted land from Marmaduke Manley who had suggested the move, that the club has now owned and occupied since 1925.

The official opening of the club took place on 4 December 1926, when Queensland Premier William McCormack hit a long drive to officially open the course for play. However, the links had been open for play unofficially for some time beforehand.

At the 115th annual general meeting on 30 May 2011, the members of the Toowoomba Golf Club – Middle Ridge, elected Nancy Young as inaugural female club president. Toowoomba Golf Club joined a select few golf clubs throughout Australia who had elected a lady to the office of Club President.

At the 2012 Queensland Golf Industry Awards the club won the Regional Tournament of the Year award for their hosting of the BMW and Westpac Pro Am Classic in September 2011.

The women's course record was set in June 2014 when 14-year-old Darcy Habgood scored a one-under round of 72.

== See also ==
- Golf in Australia
- Queensland PGA Championship
- Sport in Queensland
