= Stockyard, Queensland (Lockyer Valley) =

Stockyard
- Suburb
- Interactive map of Stockyard
- Coordinates: 27.6580°S 152.0622°E
- Country: Australia
- State: Queensland
- LGA: Lockyer Valley Region
- Location: 27.3 km (17.0 mi) SE of Toowoomba CBD; 32.2 km (20.0 mi) SW of Gatton; 89.2 km (55.4 mi) W of Ipswich; 126 km (78 mi) W of Brisbane

Government
  - State electorate: Lockyer
  - Federal division: Wright

Area
  - Total: 17.5 km^{2} (6.8 sq mi)

Population
  - Total: 65 (2021 census)
  - Density: 3.71/km^{2} (9.62/sq mi)
- Time zone: UTC+10:00 (AEST)
- Postcode: 4344
Suburbs around Stockyard
| Upper Flagstone | Flagstone Creek | Flagstone Creek |
| Rockmount | Stockyard | Flagstone Creek |
| Rockmount | Egypt | Egypt |

Stockyard is a rural locality in the Lockyer Valley Region, Queensland, Australia. In the 2021 census, Stockyard had a population of 65 people.

== History ==
Spring Park Provisional School opened in 1918. It became Spring Park State School on 1 April 1924. The school closed in 1928. By 1935, the school building, described as being on West Egypt Road (which does not exist on current maps), had been sold to Mr Dyer of Rockmount. He attempted to move the building but was unable to do so due to the condition of the roads.

== Demographics ==
In the 2016 census, Stockyard had a population of 49 people.

In the 2021 census, Stockyard had a population of 65 people.

== Education ==
There are no schools in Stockyard. The nearest government primary school is Flagstone Creek State School in neighbouring Flagstone Creek to the north-east. The nearest government secondary school is Centenary Heights State High School in Centenary Heights, Toowoomba, to the north-west.
