= Middle Ridge, Queensland =

Middle Ridge Toowoomba, Queensland
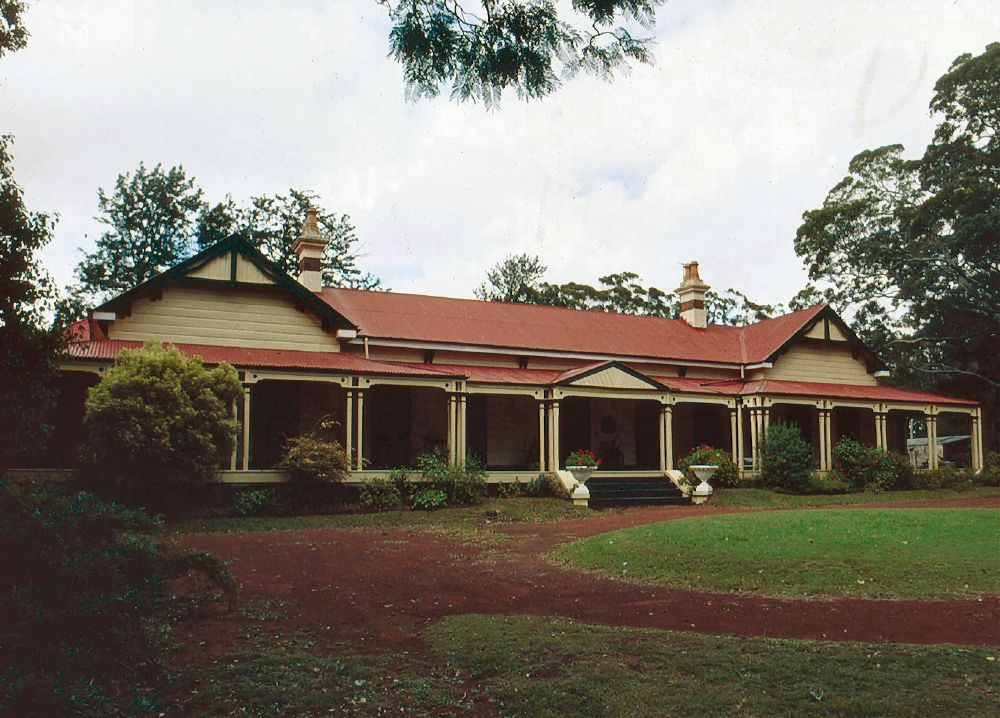
- Gabbinbar Homestead, 1997

- Coordinates: 27.6077°S 151.9688°E
- Population: 7,595 (2021 census)
  - Density: 873/km^{2} (2,261/sq mi)
- Postcode(s): 4350
- Elevation: 420–670 m (1,378–2,198 ft)
- Area: 8.7 km^{2} (3.4 sq mi)
- Time zone: AEST (UTC+10:00)
- Location: 5.7 km (4 mi) SSE of Toowoomba CBD; 129 km (80 mi) W of Brisbane
- LGA(s): Toowoomba Region
- State electorate(s): Toowoomba South
- Federal division(s): Groom
Suburbs around Middle Ridge:
Kearneys Spring	Centenary Heights	Rangeville
Kearneys Spring	Middle Ridge	Silver Ridge
Kearneys Spring	Preston	Upper Flagstone

Middle Ridge is a residential locality of Toowoomba in the Toowoomba Region, Queensland, Australia. In the 2021 census, Middle Ridge had a population of 7,595 people.

== Geography ==
Middle Ridge is located 6 kilometres (4 mi) from the Toowoomba city centre.

The Great Dividing Range passes through Middle Ridge from the north-west to the south-east. The area west of the range is on the Darling Downs at 660 to 670 metres (2,170 to 2,200 ft) above sea level and is a residential area. The area east of the range falls rapidly to as low as 420 metres (1,380 ft) above sea level.

== History ==
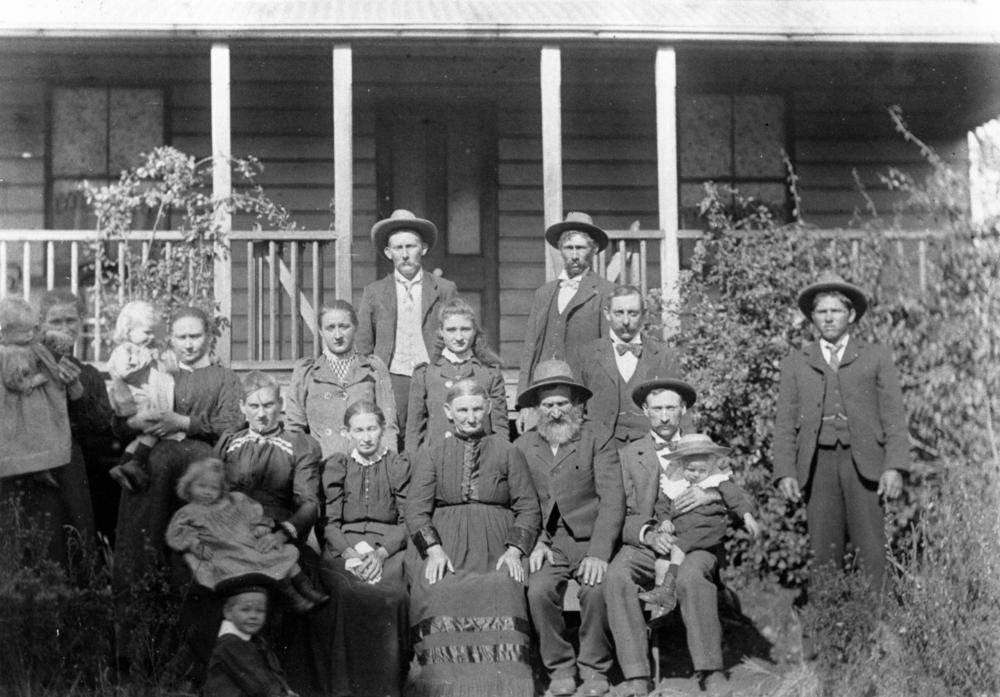
Carl Ludwig Heuschele and his wife Anna Catherina (nee Berghofer) with family at Middle Ridge, circa 1890

Middle Ridge was named in the 1860s, as the area between East and West Creeks where the teamsters who camped at Toowoomba turned their teams loose to graze.

The Shire of Middle Ridge, a local government area, existed from 1880 to 1917. The shire's centre was at the intersection of Stenner and Hume Streets (27.5934°S 151.9521°E) now the north-western corner of the locality of Middle Ridge where there was the shire hall, the school and a church.

Middle Ridge State School opened on 27 May 1884.

Between 1958 and 1961 three motor racing events took place at Middle Ridge, to coincide with the Carnival of Flowers in September. A rectangular circuit using Stenner Street-Mackenzie Street-Alderley Street-Rowbotham Street was run in an anti-clockwise direction. There have been several reasons given why racing stopped after 1961 - local farmers claimed that the races stopped their chickens laying eggs; the carnival organisers believed that loud racing engines were incompatible with flowers; or that the races were pulling spectators away from other Carnival events.

== Demographics ==
In the 2016 census, Middle Ridge had a population of 7,141 people.

In the 2021 census, Middle Ridge had a population of 7,595 people.

== Education ==
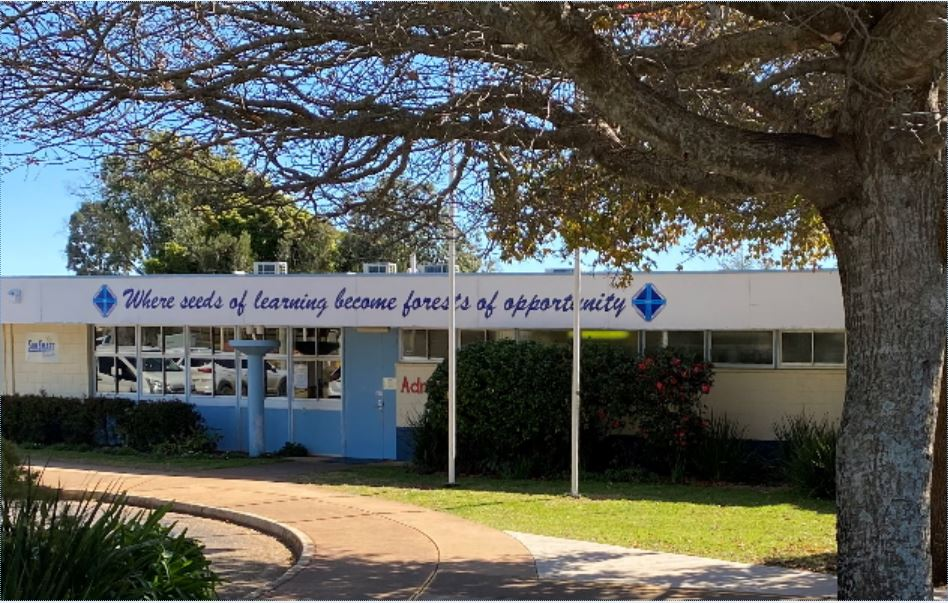
Middle Ridge State School, 2023

Middle Ridge State School is a government primary (Prep-6) school for boys and girls at 203 Spring Street (27.6017°S 151.9564°E). In 2017, the school had an enrolment of 827 students with 65 teachers (53 full-time equivalent) and 33 non-teaching staff (20 full-time equivalent). It includes a special education program.

The Tooowoomba campus of OneSchool Global (formerly known as the Agnew School) is at 40 Gerrard Street, Middle Ridge (27.5987°S 151.9562°E). It is a primary and secondary school (Years 3-12) operated by the Plymouth Brethren Christian Church. As at 26 October 2024, it has an enrolment of 66 students.

There are no government secondary schools in Middle Ridge. The nearest government secondary school is Centenary Heights State High School in neighbouring Centenary Heights to the north.

== Heritage listings ==
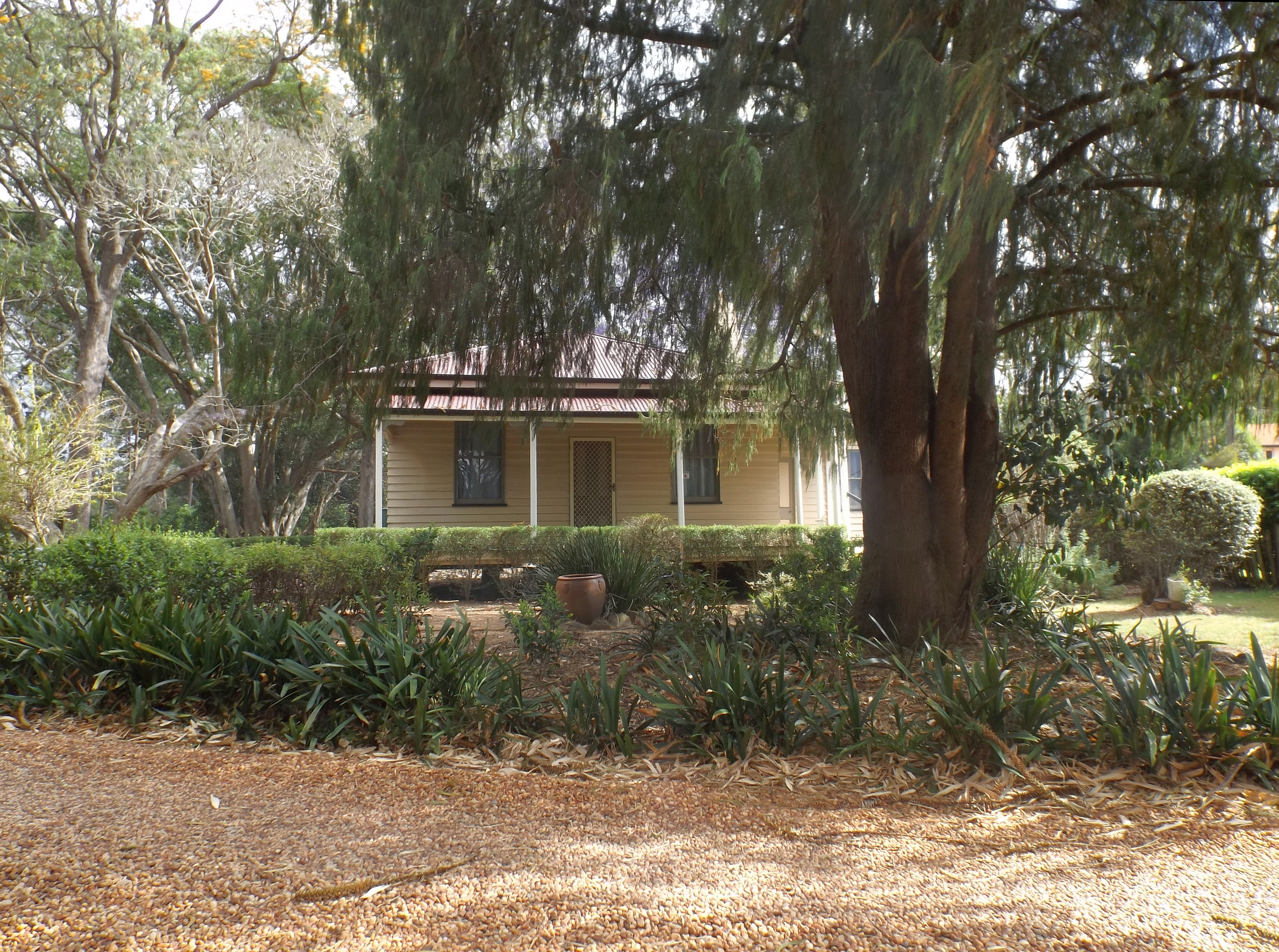
Entrance building to Gabbinbar homestead, 2014

Middle Ridge is home to the heritage-listed Gabbinbar homestead 344-376 Ramsay Street (27.6115°S 151.9597°E).

== Amenities ==
The Toowoomba Golf Club is at 245 Rowbotham Street (27.6022°S 151.9767°E). It has an 18-hole golf course.

Other sporting facilities at Middle Ridge include: the Echo Valley Motor Sport Complex (home to the Toowoomba Auto Club and Toowoomba Motocross Club) and the Valleys rugby league club.

The Middle Ridge branch of the Queensland Country Women's Association meets at 95 Preston-Boundary Road, Preston.
