= Fordsdale, Queensland =

Fordsdale
- Suburb
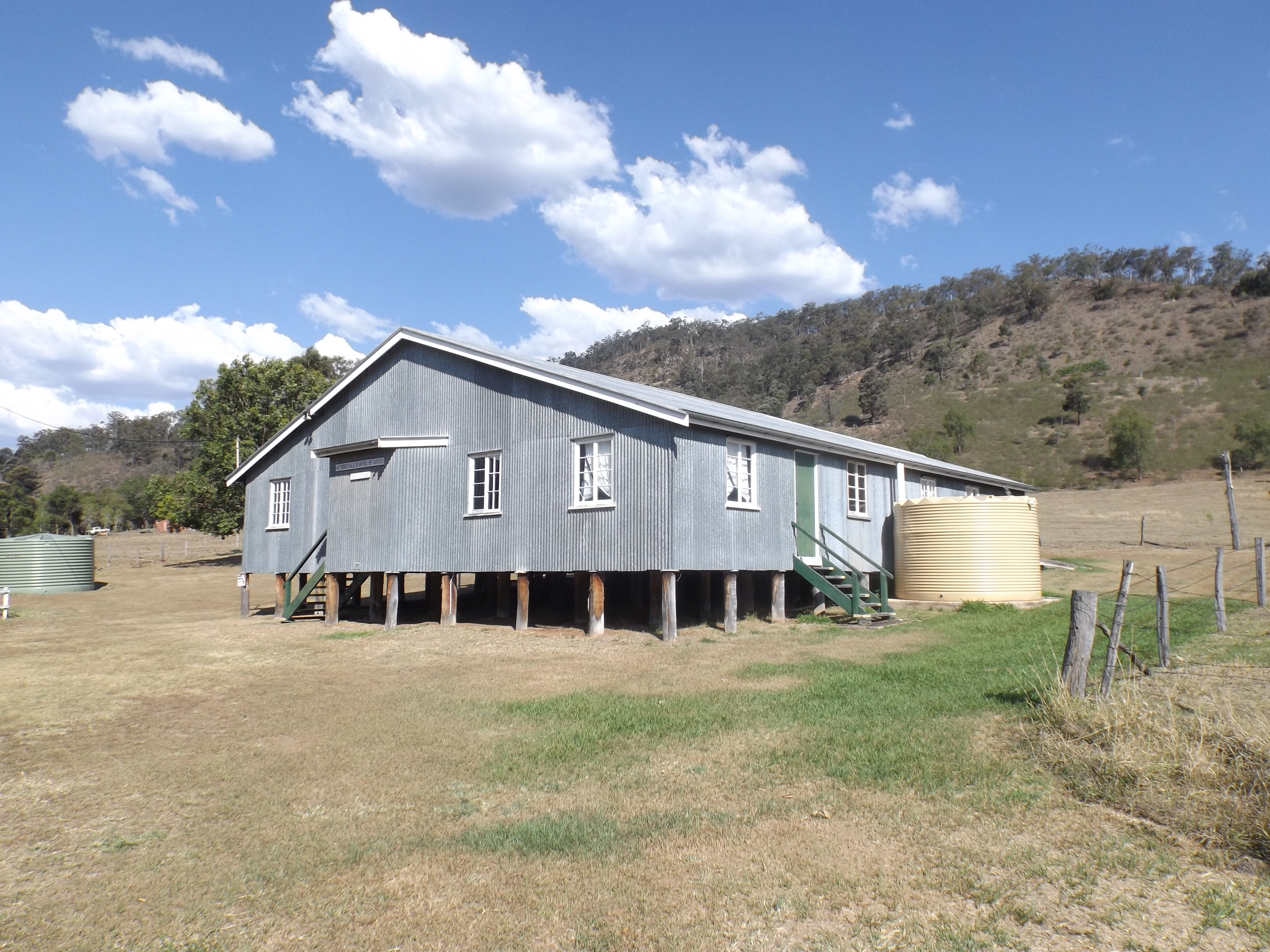
- School of Arts hall, 2014

- Interactive map of Fordsdale
- Coordinates: 27.7280°S 152.0927°E
- Country: Australia
- State: Queensland
- LGA: Lockyer Valley Region
- Location: 40.9 km (25.4 mi) SW of Gatton; 61.8 km (38.4 mi) SE of Toowoomba; 132 km (82 mi) WSW of Brisbane

Government
  - State electorate: Lockyer
  - Federal division: Wright

Area
  - Total: 64.7 km^{2} (25.0 sq mi)

Population
  - Total: 50 (2021 census)
  - Density: 0.77/km^{2} (2.00/sq mi)
- Time zone: UTC+10:00 (AEST)
- Postcode: 4343
Suburbs around Fordsdale
Rockmount	Egypt; Mount Whitestone	Mount Whitestone
Ramsay	Fordsdale	Mount Whitestone
West Haldon	West Haldon	West Haldon

Fordsdale is a rural locality in the Lockyer Valley Region, Queensland, Australia. In the 2021 census, Fordsdale had a population of 50 people.

== Geography ==
The terrain in the area is rugged. Lower areas along the creeks have been farmed while the steep and elevated parts remain vegetated. Silky Oak Creek joins Ma Ma Creek, a tributary of Lockyer Creek at Fordsdale. Dwyers Scrub Regional Park has been established in the west.

The Gatton–Clifton Road runs through from north-east to south.

== History ==
The locality is said to be named after William Thomas Ford, a farmer of Mount Whitestone, who carried the mail from Grantham to Mount Whitestone run from 1896.

Ma Ma Creek Upper Provisional School opened on 8 July 1895 with Mr H. C. Tronc as headmaster. In 1906, it was renamed Fordsdale Provisional School. On 1 January 1909, it became Fordsdale State School. In April 1929, it was closed but reopened in 1931. It was at 1902 Gatton Clifton Road (27.7081°S 152.1285°E).

Fordsdale School of Arts was officially opened on 27 May 1932 by Councillor Byrne, chairman of the Tarampa Shire Council.

In 1933, the school closed again. It reopened in 1937 with Miss E. G. M. Allen as head teacher with classes being held in the School of Arts as it was thought to be a more central location. As attendance at the new location was successfully maintained, it was decided to build a new school building on a site near the hall donated by Mr W. Bynon. The new school was officially opened on Saturday 3 June 1939 by the Leader of the Opposition, Ted Maher. The school closed in 1967. It was at approx 2085 Gatton Clifton Road (27.7199°S 152.1211°E).

== Demographics ==
At the 2011 census, Fordsdale and surrounds recorded a population 211.

In the 2016 census, Fordsdale had a population of 52 people.

In the 2021 census, Fordsdale had a population of 50 people.

== Education ==
There are no schools in Fordsdale. The nearest government primary school is Mount Whitestone State School in neighbouring Mount Whitestone to the north-east. The nearest government secondary schools are Lockyer District State High School in Gatton to the north-east and Centenary Heights State High School in Centenary Heights in Toowoomba to the north-west.

== Amenities ==
Fordsdale School of Arts Hall is at 2085 Gatton Clifton Road (27.7196°S 152.1193°E).
