= West Haldon, Queensland =

West Haldon
- Suburb
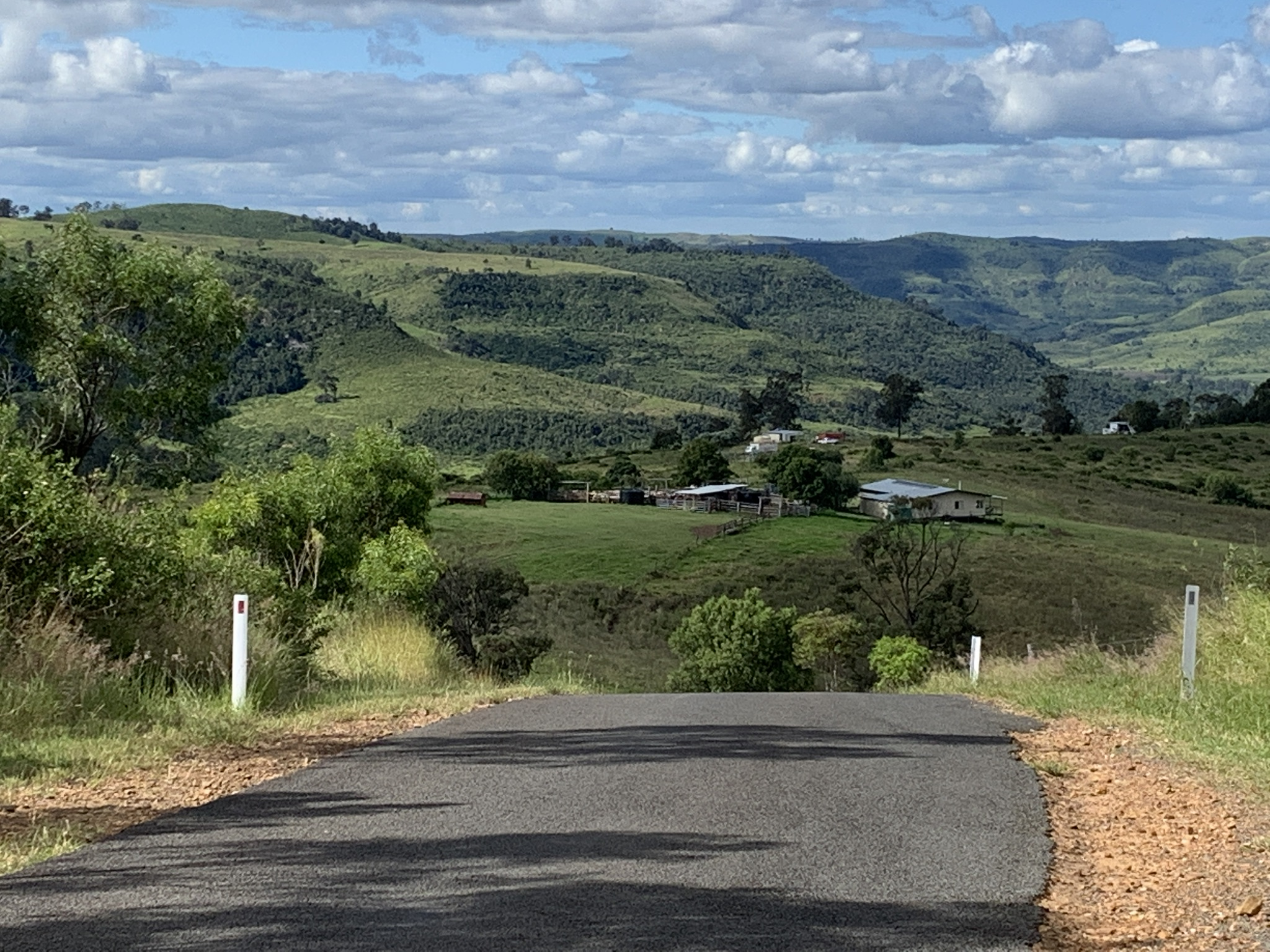
- View across West Haldon, 2022

- Interactive map of West Haldon
- Coordinates: 27.7830°S 152.0855°E
- Country: Australia
- State: Queensland
- LGAs: Toowoomba Region; Lockyer Valley Region
- Location: 31.1 km (19.3 mi) NE of Clifton; 37.5 km (23.3 mi) SW of Gatton; 52.6 km (32.7 mi) SSE of Toowoomba; 129 km (80 mi) WSW of Brisbane

Government
  - State electorates: Condamine; Lockyer
  - Federal divisions: Groom; Wright

Area
  - Total: 95.4 km^{2} (36.8 sq mi)

Population
  - Total: 63 (2021 census)
  - Density: 0.660/km^{2} (1.710/sq mi)
- Time zone: UTC+10:00 (AEST)
- Postcode: 4359
Suburbs around West Haldon
Ramsay	Fordsdale; Mount Whitestone	Mount Sylvia
Ramsay	West Haldon	Woodbine
Budgee	Hirstglen	Junction View

West Haldon is a locality split between Toowoomba Region and Lockyer Valley Region in Queensland, Australia. In the 2021 census, West Haldon had a population of 63 people.

== Geography ==
The locality is bounded by the south-west and south by the Main Range, part of the Great Dividing Range. The terrain varies from 230 to 790 metres (750 to 2,590 ft) with the lower elevations generally in the east of the locality, rising higher toward the ridgeline of the Great Dividing Range. There are three named peaks:

- Tipsy Point in the north-west of the locality (27.7324°S 152.0350°E) 622 metres (2,041 ft)
- Townley Point in the north-west of the locality (27.7452°S 152.0303°E) 677 metres (2,221 ft)
- Paradise Mountain in the north-east of the locality (27.7587°S 152.1586°E) 702 metres (2,303 ft)

The land use is almost entirely grazing on native vegetation.

The Gatton–Clifton Road enters the locality from the north (Fordsdale) and exits to the south (Hirstglen).

== History ==
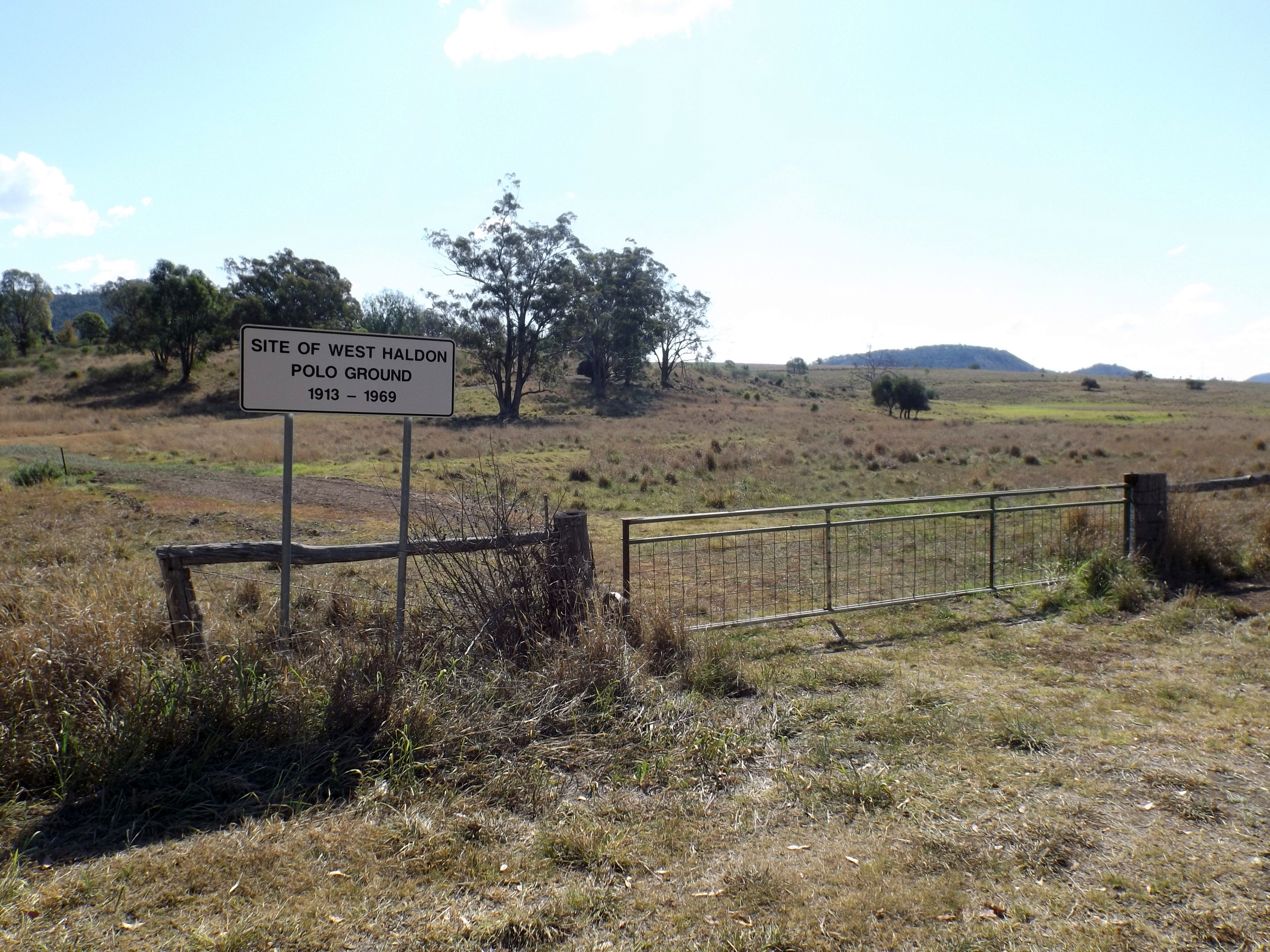
Former polo ground, 2014

In March 1892, local residents met to establish a school. Mr Young offered 5 acres (2.0 ha) of land and others offered to raise funds. West Haldon Provisional School opened on 7 April 1896 with 17 students under head teacher Bernard MacGinley. On 1 January 1909, it became West Haldon State School. It closed on 18 September 1949 due to low student numbers. It was on the south-east corner of Gatton Clifton Road and MacGinley Road (approx 27.7838°S 152.0990°E).

The West Haldon Polo Club was established in 1913 and operated until 1969 at 3380 Gatton-Clifton Road (27.7976°S 152.1044°E).

== Demographics ==
In the 2016 census, West Haldon had a population of 62 people.

In the 2021 census, West Haldon had a population of 63 people.

== Education ==
There are no schools in West Haldon. The nearest government primary schools are:

- Mount Whitestone State School in neighbouring Mount Whitestone to the north
- Mount Sylvia State School in neighbouring Mount Sylvia to the north-east
- Pilton State School in Pilton to the south
- Emu Creek State School in East Greenmount to the west
- Ramsay State School in neighbouring Ramsay to the north-west

The nearest government secondary schools are:

- Lockyer District State High School in Gatton to the north-east
- Clifton State High School in Clifton to the south-west
- Centenary Heights State High School in Centenary Heights to the north-west
