= Derrymore, Queensland =

Derrymore
- Suburb
- Interactive map of Derrymore
- Coordinates: 27.5825°S 152.0597°E
- Country: Australia
- State: Queensland
- LGA: Lockyer Valley Region
- Location: 19.6 km (12.2 mi) E of Toowoomba; 32.5 km (20.2 mi) W of Gatton; 81.1 km (50.4 mi) W of Ipswich; 118 km (73 mi) W of Brisbane

Government
  - State electorate: Lockyer
  - Federal division: Wright

Area
  - Total: 16.0 km^{2} (6.2 sq mi)

Population
  - Total: 85 (2021 census)
  - Density: 5.31/km^{2} (13.76/sq mi)
- Time zone: UTC+10:00 (AEST)
- Postcode: 4352
Suburbs around Derrymore
Blanchview	Helidon Spa	Iredale
Blanchview	Derrymore	Iredale
Silver Ridge	Flagstone Creek	Flagstone Creek

Derrymore is a rural locality in the Lockyer Valley Region, Queensland, Australia. In the 2021 census, Derrymore had a population of 85 people.

== History ==
Puzzling Gully Provisional School opened on 24 July 1899. On 1 January 1909, it became Puzzling Gully State School. In 1914, it was renamed Derrymore State School. It closed in 1922.

== Education ==
There are no schools in Derrymore. The nearest government primary schools are Helidon State School in Helidon to the north-east, Withcott State School in Withcott to the north-west, and Flagstone Creek State School in neighbouring Flagstone Creek to the south-east. The nearest government secondary school is Centenary Heights State High School in Centenary Heights, Toowoomba, to the west.
