= Mount Whitestone, Queensland =

Mount Whitestone
- Suburb
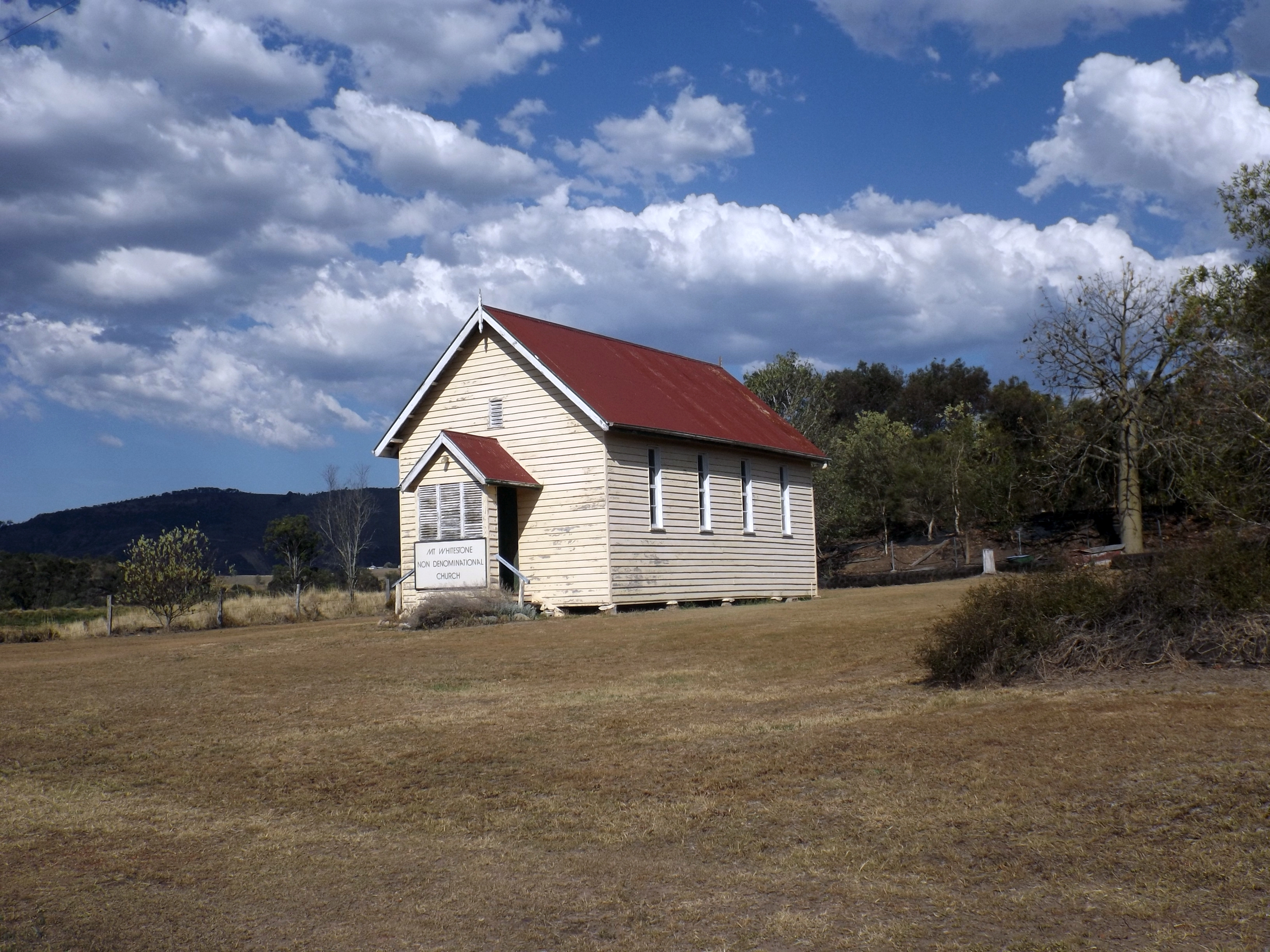
- Mount Whitestone Non-denominational Church, 2014

- Interactive map of Mount Whitestone
- Coordinates: 27.7000°S 152.1580°E
- Country: Australia
- State: Queensland
- LGA: Lockyer Valley Region
- Location: 19.5 km (12.1 mi) SW of Gatton; 40.3 km (25.0 mi) SE of Toowoomba; 111 km (69 mi) WSW of Brisbane

Government
  - State electorate: Lockyer
  - Federal division: Wright

Area
  - Total: 50.5 km^{2} (19.5 sq mi)

Population
  - Total: 129 (2021 census)
  - Density: 2.554/km^{2} (6.62/sq mi)
- Time zone: UTC+10:00 (AEST)
- Postcode: 4347
Suburbs around Mount Whitestone
Flagstone Creek	Ma Ma Creek	Upper Tenthill
Egypt	Mount Whitestone	Caffey
Fordsdale	West Haldon	Mount Sylvia

Mount Whitestone is a rural locality in the Lockyer Valley Region, Queensland, Australia. In the 2021 census, Mount Whitestone had a population of 129 people.

== Geography ==
In the south elevations rise to around 690 metres (2,260 ft) above sea level near Paradise Mountain. The summit of Mount Whitestone itself is centrally located and reaches 530 metres (1,740 ft). To the north of the peak Paradise Creek joins Ma Ma Creek. Both of these waterways drain valleys extending southwards on either side of Mount Whitestone.

The Gatton–Clifton Road (State Route 80) passes through from north to south-west. The Tenthill Conservation Park is in the east of the locality.

== History ==
Mount Whitestone Provisional School was established on 22 March 1886. It became Mount Whitestone State School on 1 January 1909.

Mount Whitestone Church of Christ officially opened on Wednesday 16 August 1899.

Spring Park Provisional School opened in 1918. Circa 1927, it became Spring Park State School. It closed in 1928.

== Demographics ==
At the 2011 census, Mount Whitestone and surrounds recorded a population of 211.

In the 2016 census, Mount Whitestone had a population of 154 people.

In the 2021 census, Mount Whitestone had a population of 129 people.

== Education ==
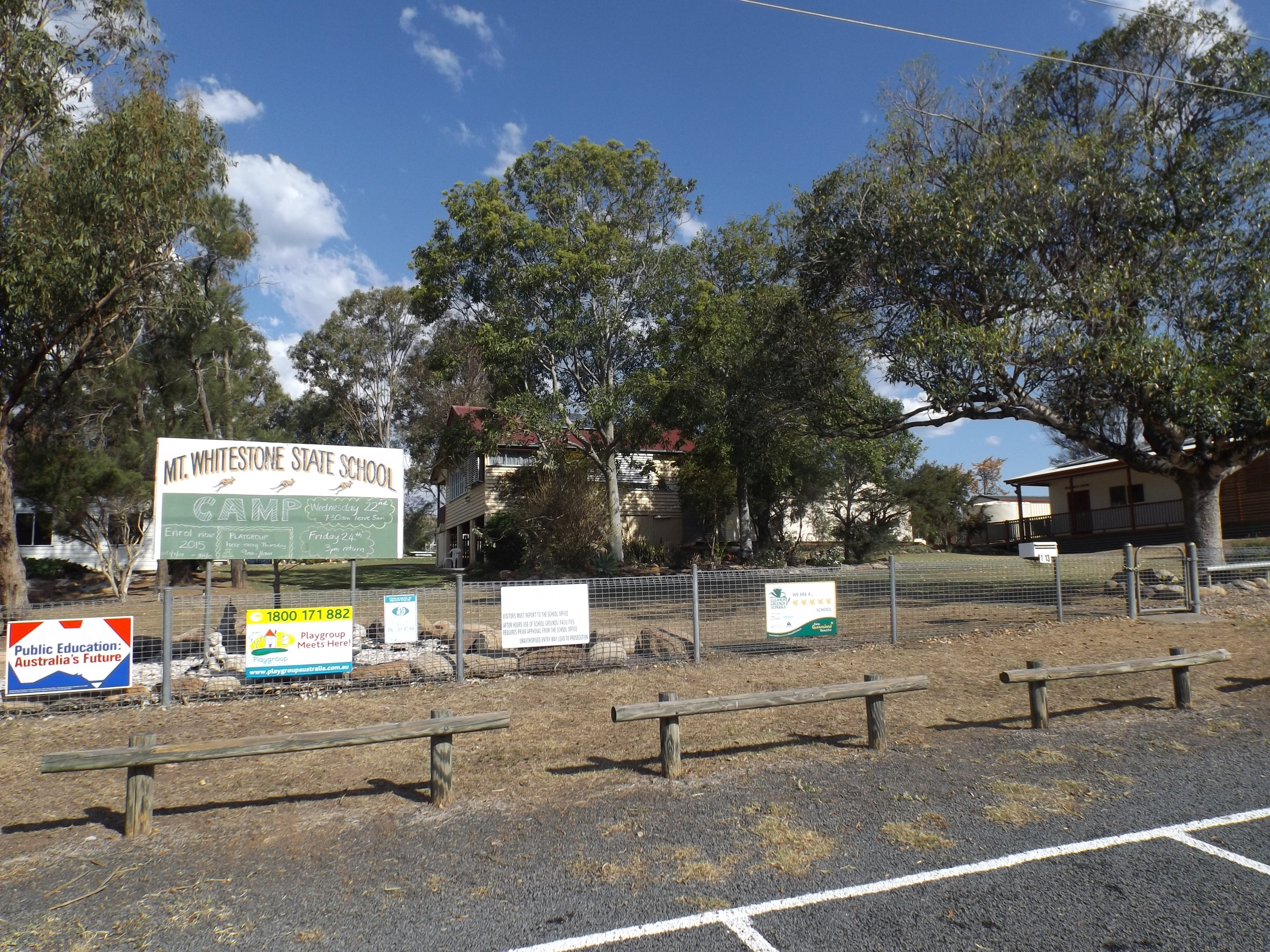
Mount Whitestone State School

Mount Whitestone State School is a government primary (Prep-6) school for boys and girls at 1313 Gatton-Clifton Road (27.6650°S 152.1601°E). In 2017, the school had an enrolment of 23 students with 3 teachers (2 full-time equivalent) and 3 non-teaching staff (2 full-time equivalent).

There is no secondary school in Mount Whitestone, the nearest are Lockyer District State High School in Gatton and Centenary Heights State High School in Centenary Heights, Toowoomba.
