= Flagstone Creek, Queensland =

Flagstone Creek
- Suburb
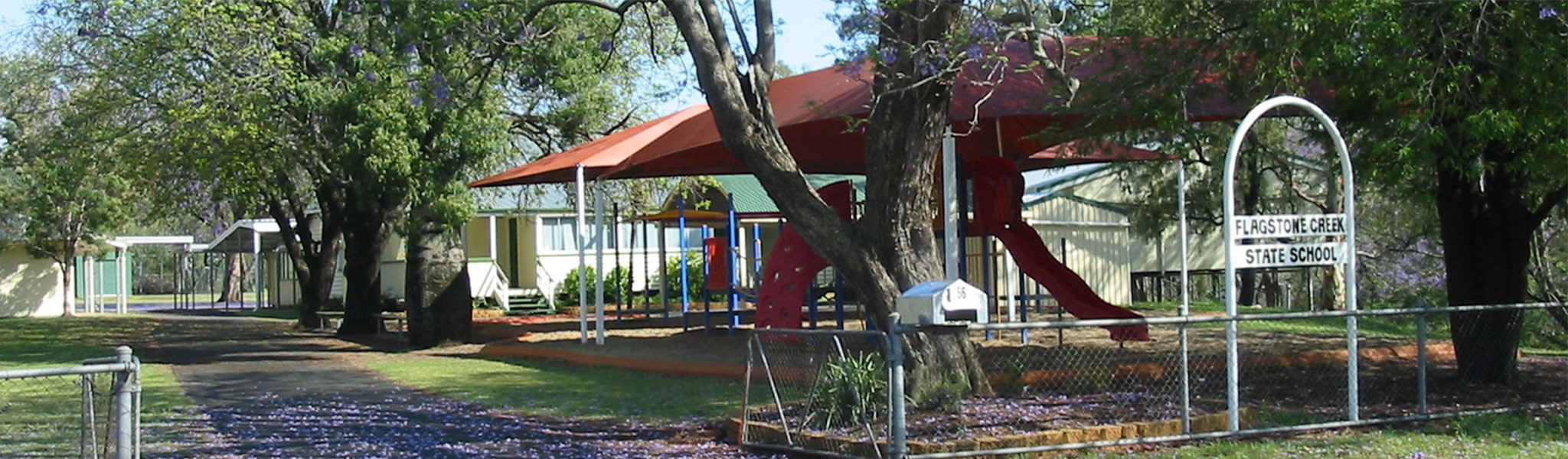
- Flagstone Creek State School, 2022

- Interactive map of Flagstone Creek
- Coordinates: 27.6286°S 152.0947°E
- Country: Australia
- State: Queensland
- LGA: Lockyer Valley Region
- Location: 25.5 km (15.8 mi) ESE of Toowoomba; 26.6 km (16.5 mi) WSW of Gatton; 117 km (73 mi) WSW of Brisbane

Government
  - State electorate: Lockyer
  - Federal division: Wright

Area
  - Total: 44.5 km^{2} (17.2 sq mi)

Population
  - Total: 256 (2021 census)
  - Density: 5.753/km^{2} (14.90/sq mi)
- Time zone: UTC+10:00 (AEST)
- Postcode: 4344
Suburbs around Flagstone Creek
Derrymore	Iredale	Lilydale
Silver Ridge; Upper Flagstone	Flagstone Creek	Ma Ma Creek
Stockyard	Egypt	Mount Whitestone

Flagstone Creek is a rural locality in the Lockyer Valley Region, Queensland, Australia. In the 2021 census, Flagstone Creek had a population of 256 people.

== Geography ==
Flagstone Creek (the watercourse) flows through from west to north-east.

== History ==
In 1840, the penal colony at Moreton Bay was being prepared to be turned into a free settlement (which ultimately became the city of Brisbane). As there was settlement already occurring on the Darling Downs, there was a need for Lieutenant Owen Gorman, the last commandant of the penal colony, to find a wagon route between the two locations, but the obstacle was the mountains of the Great Dividing Range. There was a route already known at Cunninghams Gap but it was not able to be used by a wagon. A convict John Sterry Baker had escaped from the penal colony in 1826 and had lived among the Goomburra Aboriginal people in the Lockyer Valley area and walked with them on a track to the top of the range. Having returned to the penal colony in 1840, Baker told Gorman of the track up the range and modified an Irish jaunting car to test as a wagon on the route. Together Gorman and Baker ascended the range with their wagon on 17 October 1840 arriving at Eton Vale. Despite the fact that Gorman did not discover the route, it nonetheless became known as Gorman's Gap Road. The route which runs between Upper Flagstone in the west and Flagstone Creek in the east was marked by blazing a line of trees. It became the first gazetted road in Queensland. Today, the road no longer officially exists and is overgrown but can still be followed. There are three monuments along the route, one at each end and the other along the route at Camel's Hump where Gorman took his compass bearing.

Flagstone Creek Provisional School opened on 18 January 1886, becoming Flagstone State School in 1904.

Mount Campbell Provisional School opened on 26 October 1891. On 1 January 1909, it became Mount Campbell State School. It closed on 13 March 1960 but reopened on 30 January 1968. It closed permanently on 31 December 1978. It was at 35 Mount Campbell Road (27.6355°S 152.0584°E).

A Methodist Church had been established at 55 Flagstone School Road (27.6159°S 152.1149°E) by April 1909 and was still in existence as Flagstone Creek Uniting Church in December 2000, but no longer exists as at February 2021.

== Demographics ==
In the 2011 census, Flagstone Creek had a population of 213 people.

In the 2016 census, Flagstone Creek had a population of 220 people.

In the 2021 census, Flagstone Creek had a population of 256 people.

== Heritage listings ==
Sites of cultural heritage identified in Flagstone Creek include:

- Stockyard Creek Community Hall, 111 Stockyard Creek Road
- former Mount Campbell State School, 68 Mount Campbell Creek Road
- Rosedale (house), 1081 Flagstone Creek Road
- House, 849 Flagstone Creek Road
- Flagstone Creek State School and residence, 56 Flagstone School Road:
- Uniting Church (Lockyer Parish), 55 Flagstone School Road

== Education ==
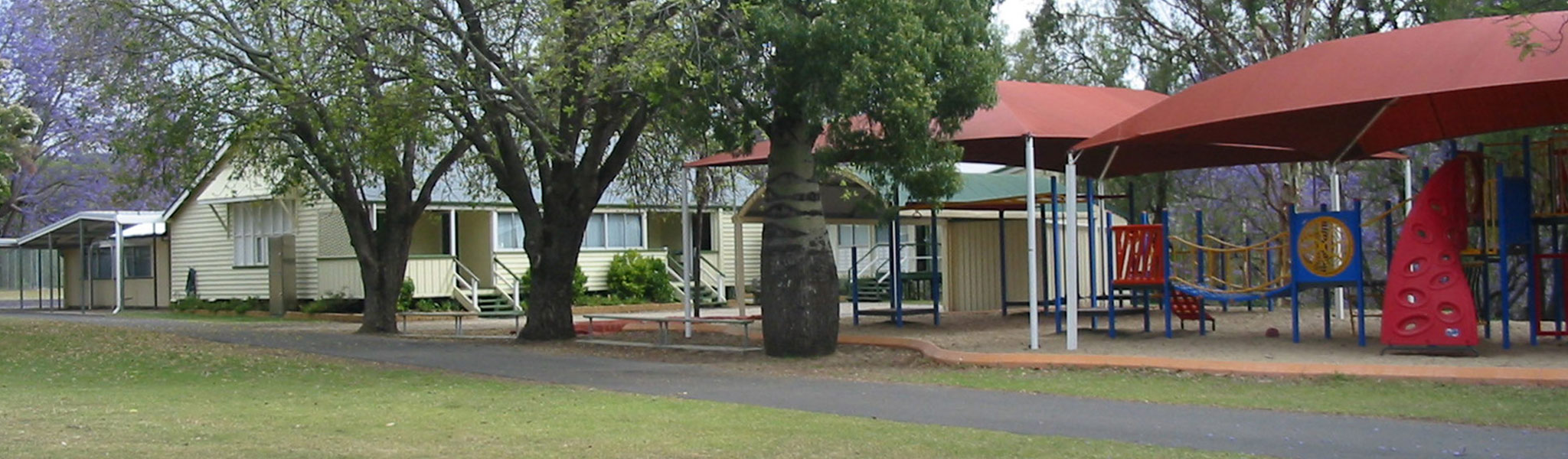
Flagstone Creek State School, 2022

Flagstone Creek State School is a government primary (Prep–6) school for boys and girls at 56 Flagstone School Road (27.6155°S 152.1149°E). In 2018, the school had an enrolment of 33 students with 5 teachers (3 full-time equivalent) and 5 non-teaching staff (2 full-time equivalent).

There are no secondary schools in Flagstone Creek. The nearest government secondary schools are Lockyer District State High School in Gatton to the north-east and Centenary Heights State High School in Centenary Heights in Toowoomba to the west.

== Amenities ==
Stockyard Creek Community Hall is at 111 Stockyard Creek Road (27.6423°S 152.0635°E).
