= Eco-action =

An eco-action is any action or activity within a program that is intended to have a positive impact on the environment. For this reason it is often used as a synonym for environmental action. Historically people adopting eco-actions tended to target activities around the ‘Three Rs’ of the waste hierarchy, Reduce, Reuse and Recycle, but popularity of eco-action has expanded to include Refuse, Reimagine, Regenerate, Restore. Anyone can carry out small-scale eco-friendly actions such as reducing food waste or resource consumption, or the volume of paper used in offices, or purchasing products only from companies that have environmentally friendly, sustainability or social justice policies. Others adopt eco-actions that impact where they live by cleaning up beaches, removing graffiti, supporting community gardening, or restoring local environments, because the immediate community has come to be considered part of their ecosystem. Every contribution to sustainability and regeneration is eco-action.

== Widening trend ==
Eco-action groups have tended to be small and unstructured but as their influence grows, their ideas are being co-opted by environmental action groups, sometimes backed by non-governmental organizations (NGOs) like Worldwatch Institute, and those that are part of larger alliances such as the Clean Water Network.

There has been a recent trend where eco-actions have begun attracting leadership from a national standpoint with several governments stepping in. Canada’s “EcoAction Community Funding program” encourages inner city residents to take actions that improve their communities. The government of Japan backs companies that reward citizens with “eco action points” when they take positive action toward the environment. Industries have begun adopt eco-labels too. The Marine Stewardship Council adopted its own label for commercial and non-commercial use, with specific guidelines. Such emerging interest has burgeoned with the development of measurement tools that can evaluate and track such individual or group behaviour over time. The best examples of this development are the emergence of ecological footprint calculators such as carbon footprint and water footprint calculators, and new mapping tools. As interest in eco-action grows we see consumers demanding better ecolabeling, and standardized eco-certification programs. In 2024, cities are shaping sustainable tourism by rewarding environmental choices with museum or restaurant passes, or taxes that protect local wildlife and "consumers are prioritizing consumption that integrates sustainability-focused practices."
