= Centenary Heights, Queensland =

Centenary Heights Toowoomba, Queensland
- Coordinates: 27.5861°S 151.9619°E
- Population: 6,152 (2021 census)
  - Density: 1,980/km^{2} (5,140/sq mi)
- Postcode(s): 4350
- Area: 3.1 km^{2} (1.2 sq mi)
- Time zone: AEST (UTC+10:00)
- Location: 4.5 km (3 mi) SE of Toowoomba CBD; 127 km (79 mi) W of Brisbane
- LGA(s): Toowoomba Region
- State electorate(s): Toowoomba South
- Federal division(s): Groom
Suburbs around Centenary Heights:
South Toowoomba	South Toowoomba	Rangeville
Kearneys Spring	Centenary Heights	Rangeville
Kearneys Spring	Middle Ridge	Middle Ridge

Centenary Heights is a residential locality of Toowoomba in the Toowoomba Region, Queensland, Australia. In the 2021 census, Centenary Heights had a population of 6,152 people.

== Geography ==
Centenary Heights is located 4 kilometres (2 mi) south-east from the central business district.

== History ==
Previously part of Middle Ridge, the area was named Centenary Heights in 1960 in honour of the separation of Queensland from New South Wales in 1859.

Toowoomba Opportunity School (later Toowoomba Special School) opened on 26 January 1960 at 58 Ramsay Street (27.5780°S 151.9644°E) on part of the site reserved for a new secondary school. The opportunity school had its origins in the special education ("opportunity classes") commenced at Toowoomba South State School in South Toowoomba in 1923. The school officially closed on 12 December 1997, but the site continued to operate as the 2nd campus of the Clifford Park Special School (which had its main campus in Newtown). Since 2009, the site has been used as the Toowoomba Positive Learning Centre.

St Thomas More's Catholic Primary School opened 23 January 1961.

Centenary Heights State High School opened on 30 January 1968 at 60 Ramsay Street, adjacent to the special school.

Gabbinbar State School opened on 24 January 1972.

Martin Luther Primary School opened 24 January 1977.

== Demographics ==
In the 2016 census, Centenary Heights had a population of 6,063 people.

In the 2021 census, Centenary Heights had a population of 6,152 people.

== Education ==
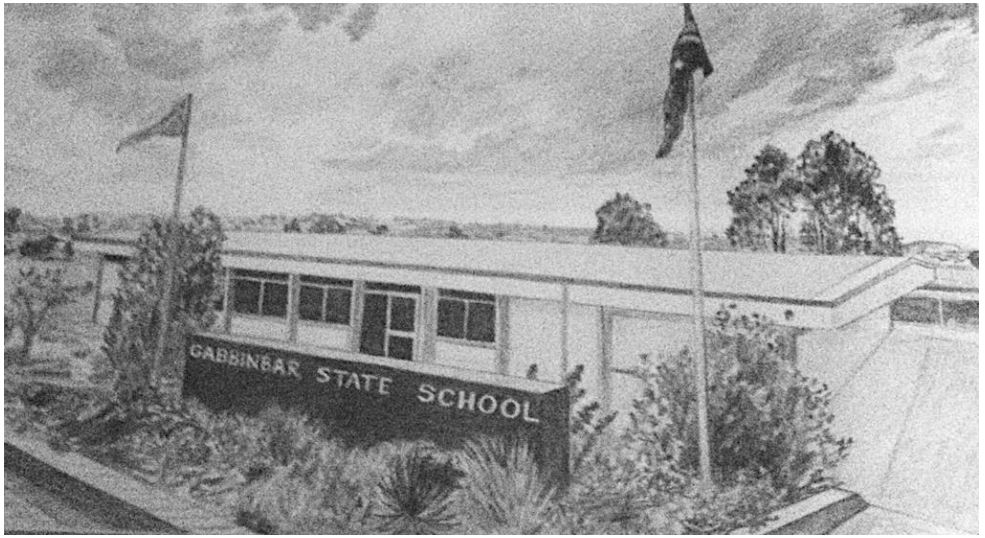
Gabbinar State School

Gabbinbar State School is a government primary (Prep–6) school for boys and girls at 189 Stenner Street (27.5959°S 151.9692°E). In 2017, the school had an enrolment of 386 students with 36 teachers (34 full-time equivalent) and 16 non-teaching staff (12 full-time equivalent). It includes a special education program.

St Thomas More's Primary School is a Catholic primary (Prep–6) school for boys and girls at 152 South Street (27.5801°S 151.9620°E). In 2017, the school had an enrolment of 396 students with 25 teachers (22 full-time equivalent) and 14 non-teaching staff (9 full-time equivalent).

Martin Luther Primary School is a private primary (Prep–6) campus of Concordia Lutheran College for boys and girls at 402 Hume Street (27.5915°S 151.9544°E). In 2017, the school had an enrolment of 644 students with 68 teachers (48 full-time equivalent) and 75 non-teaching staff (45 full-time equivalent).

Centenary Heights State High School is a government secondary (7–12) school for boys and girls at 60 Ramsay Street (27.5794°S 151.9637°E). In 2017, the school had an enrolment of 1,625 students with 131 teachers (123 full-time equivalent) and 59 non-teaching staff (45 full-time equivalent). It includes a special education program.

Toowoomba Positive Learning Centre (also known as the Denise Kalble campus) is a specific purpose secondary (7–12) school at 58 Ramsay Street (27.5789°S 151.9642°E). It is for children who have disengaged from conventional schooling with the aim to re-engage the children with conventional schooling or vocational pathways.

== Amenities ==
There are a number of parks in the area:

- Emmerson Park (27.5853°S 151.9679°E)
- Harwood Park (27.5921°S 151.9573°E)
- Horner Reserve Park (27.5847°S 151.9589°E)
- Ravenscourt Street Park (27.5812°S 151.9552°E)

Emmerson Park has two separate play areas, a barbecue, and a significant planting of mature trees.

Horners Reserve has one small park and a large town water storage reserve.
