= Centenary Heights State High School =

Coordinates: 27°34′49.88″S 151°57′50.05″E

Centenary Heights High School
- Toowoomba, Queensland; Australia

Information
- Motto: Latin: Per Ardua Ad Alta (Through Hard Work to the Top)
- Established: 13 February 1968
- Founder: Bob Dansie
- President: Wayne Heading
- Principal: Dan Lindenmayer
- Years offered: Centenary Heights: Year 7–Year 12; Toowoomba Flexischool: Year 10–Year 12
- Enrolment: Centenary Heights: 1700 (2020); Toowoomba Flexischool: 203
- Website: centheigshs.eq.edu.au Flexischool

Centenary Heights State High School is a State High School located in the suburb of Centenary Heights in Toowoomba, Queensland, with an enrolment of around 1700 students (2020) and was one of Queensland's leading high schools with 11 OP's 1 (Overall Position) scored in 2012. The school is one of several state high schools in Toowoomba, including Toowoomba State High School, Harristown State High School and Wilsonton State High School.

== History ==
Centenary Heights State High School was founded in 1968, as a coeducational institution, with an initial enrolment of 168 students. The construction for the main building was commenced in 1967 and completed in 1968.

In 1990 the school began works on upgrading its dirt ovals to grass ovals to reduce student injuries. Due to budget constraints the school only managed to upgrade one of its three ovals.

In 2008, the school began a A$5 million project to upgrade the library into a multi-resource centre for the students and the community, and this was completed in 2009. The facility consists of a study hall with computer facilities, thousands of books, and six rooms where students or the community can study or meet.

In 2015 the school integrated the Flying Start program, meaning that year seven students would now be enrolled at the school. In response to the growth of the school by roughly 250 students, a large year seven building was built, and it incorporated a range of facilities that were completely new to the school.

The school's principal from 2003 was Maryanne Walsh. She had previously been the principal of Toowoomba High School from 2000 to 2003. In 2010 she appeared on the Channel 7 breakfast show Sunrise in relation to the Toowoomba Flexi School program.

== Curriculum ==
The school offers students many subject choices. Students from Year 8 to Year 10 undertake core studies in Mathematics, English, Science, and Studies of Society and Environment (SOSE), as well a variety of other subjects from the arts, languages other than English, business studies, Information and communications technology, and practical areas.

Year 11 and 12 Subjects are more diverse and allow students a greater choice in electives. Most of these subjects are Overall Position (OP) eligible, but some are OP Ineligible and SATS subjects. Students in Year 12 also are required to undertake Queensland Core Skills Test (QCS) practice and the QCS (Queensland Certificate of Education (QCE)). This helps determine the student's OP and the school's progress.

== Community and clubs ==
Centenary offers many extracurricular activities and clubs. These include Student council, Rotary Interact, Peer support, Peer Mediation, debating, Eco-action, Harmony Week and Day, ski trip, Relay For Life, Book Trailer Club, Toastmasters and, Games Plus.

The student council consists of two representatives from every year level, a secretary, treasurer, president and vice-president. Their purpose is to raise money for projects throughout the school, including bubblers, bins, and furniture. The Rotary Interact Club is supported by the Toowoomba South Rotary International Club, and raises money for community organisations and charities, including Lifeline and Jeans for Genes day.

Centenary's Parents and Citizens Association spends the money raised by these events on the school's facilities. The most recent additions include the terrace shade structure and the prepaid tuckshop counter. The Parents and Citizens Association is currently run by its president Wayne Heading, who was elected in March 2014.

== Sports ==
Centenary Heights State High School offers students a diverse range of sports. The Australian Rules Football team, the Centenary Tigers have won Queensland High School League championships in the past. The school also has very successful basketball teams. Both the boys and the girls won overall champions in the All-Schools Toowoomba Competition in 2013. The school also offers sports such as baseball, softball, cricket, basketball, netball, tennis, squash, hockey, volleyball, badminton, soccer, rugby, touch, athletics, swimming, cross country running, water polo, martial arts, cheerleading and boxing.

The school has an intraschool sports program, and also conducts interschool competitions against other schools from Ipswich, Goondiwindi, Dalby, Toowoomba and Warwick.

== Flexi school ==
The Toowoomba Flexi School is an alternative to mainstream schooling, and operates as an annexe of Centenary Heights State High School. This allows for students to study, participate in a band, and undertake work experience.

== Notable alumni ==
- Laura Elvery – multi-award winning author of literary fiction
- Rachael Grinham – professional squash player; World Open winner, and former World No. 1
- Nikki Hudson – former Australian representative hockey player; Olympic, Commonwealth and World Cup gold medallist
- Andrew McCabe – Australian representative to the 2012 Olympics in Athletics
- Robbie O'Davis – former Newcastle Knights, Queensland, and Australian representative rugby league player
- Dan Stains – Former Cronulla Sharks, Balmain Tigers and Queensland State Of Origin Player.
- Kosta Theodosis – Drummer for the band Amy Meredith
- Tim Watts – Member of Parliament representing the federal seat of Gellibrand, Victoria.
