= Laidley =

Laidley may refer to:

- Laidley (name)

== Places ==
=== Australia ===
- Laidley, Queensland, a town in South East Queensland, Australia
  - Laidley Valley (Mulgowie) railway line
  - Laidley Golf Club
- Town of Laidley, a former local government area comprising Laidley, Queensland
- Shire of Laidley, a former local government area in Queensland
- Laidley Creek West, Queensland, a locality in the Lockyer Valley Region
- Laidley Heights, Queensland, a locality in the Lockyer Valley Region
- Laidley North, Queensland, a locality in the Lockyer Valley Region
- Laidley South, Queensland, a locality in the Lockyer Valley Region

=== United States ===
- Laidley Tower in Charleston, West Virginia, U.S.
