= Glen Cairn, Queensland =

Glen Cairn
- Suburb
- Interactive map of Glen Cairn
- Coordinates: 27.6147°S 152.3300°E
- Country: Australia
- State: Queensland
- LGA: Lockyer Valley Region
- Location: 17.7 km (11.0 mi) SE of Gatton; 53.3 km (33.1 mi) E of Toowoomba; 54.4 km (33.8 mi) W of Ipswich, Queensland; 91.6 km (56.9 mi) WSW of Brisbane

Government
  - State electorate: Lockyer
  - Federal division: Wright

Area
  - Total: 14.9 km^{2} (5.8 sq mi)

Population
  - Total: 141 (2021 census)
  - Density: 9.46/km^{2} (24.51/sq mi)
- Time zone: UTC+10:00 (AEST)
- Postcode: 4342
Suburbs around Glen Cairn
Gatton	Lawes	Forest Hill
Woodlands	Glen Cairn	Laidley Heights
Blenheim	Blenheim	Blenheim

Glen Cairn is a rural locality in the Lockyer Valley Region, Queensland, Australia. In the 2021 census, Glen Cairn had a population of 141 people.

== Geography ==
The eastern part of the locality is lower flatter land mostly cleared for irrigated seasonal horticulture. The western part of the locality is hillier and has more natural bushland; it is predominantly used for grazing on native vegetation.

== History ==
The Ropeley East State school building was relocated to Glen Cairn in early 1926. Glen Cairn State School opened on 4 October 1926. It closed in 1972. It was on Glen Cairn Road (approx 27.6146°S 152.3394°E).

== Demographics ==
In the 2016 census, Glen Cairn had a population of 113 people.

In the 2021 census, Glen Cairn had a population of 141 people.

== Education ==
There are no schools in Glen Cairn. The nearest government primary schools are Forest Hill State School in neighbouring Forest Hill to the north-east, Blenheim State School in neighbouring Blenheim to the south, and Gatton State School in neighbouring Gatton to the north-west. The nearest government secondary schools are Laidley State High School in Laidley to the east and Lockyer District State High School in Gatton to the north-west.
