= Victoria Tunnel =

Victoria Tunnel may refer to:

- Victoria Tunnel (Liverpool), England
- Victoria Tunnel (Newcastle), England
- Victoria Tunnel, Queensland, Australia
- Mount Victoria Tunnel, Wellington, New Zealand
