= Laidley (name) =

Laidley or Laidlay may refer to the following people:

Given name

- Laidley Burge (1897–1990), Australian rugby league player

Surname

- Dean Laidley (born 1967), Australian rules footballer and coach
- James Laidley (1823–1877), Australian politician
- James Laidley (administrator) (1786–1835), Australian administrator
- John Laidley (1791–1863), American lawyer and politician
- John Watson Laidlay (1808–1885), Scottish merchant, numismatist and orientalist
- Johnny Laidlay (1860–1940), Scottish golfer
- William Laidley (1828–1897), Australian politician
