= Woodlands, Queensland =

Woodlands
- Suburb
- Interactive map of Woodlands
- Coordinates: 27.6111°S 152.2838°E
- Country: Australia
- State: Queensland
- LGA: Lockyer Valley Region
- Location: 8.1 km (5.0 mi) S of Gatton; 42.3 km (26.3 mi) E of Toowoomba; 55.6 km (34.5 mi) W of Ipswich; 98.6 km (61.3 mi) WSW of Brisbane

Government
  - State electorate: Lockyer
  - Federal division: Wright

Area
  - Total: 16.2 km^{2} (6.3 sq mi)

Population
  - Total: 119 (2021 census)
  - Density: 7.35/km^{2} (19.03/sq mi)
- Time zone: UTC+10:00 (AEST)
- Postcode: 4343
Suburbs around Woodlands
Gatton	Gatton	Glen Cairn
Lower Tenthill	Woodlands	Glen Cairn
Lower Tenthill	Ropeley	Blenheim

Woodlands is a rural locality in the Lockyer Valley Region, Queensland, Australia. In the 2021 census, Woodlands had a population of 119 people.

== History ==
Woodlands Provisional School opened on 28 March 1897. On 1 January 1909, it became Woodlands State School. It closed on 12 December 1975. It was at 714 Woodlands Road (27.6206°S 152.2804°E).

== Demographics ==
In the 2016 census, Woodlands had a population of 109 people.

In the 2021 census, Woodlands had a population of 119 people.

== Education ==
There are no schools in Woodlands. The nearest government primary schools are:

- Gatton State School in neighbouring Gatton to the north
- Blenheim State School in neighbouring Blenheim to the south-east
- Ropeley State School in neighbouring Ropeley to the south
- Tent Hill Lower State School in neighbouring Lower Tent Hill to the west

The nearest government secondary school is Lockyer District State High School in neighbouring Gatton to the north.

There are also non-government schools in Gattton.
