= Grandchester Sawmills =

Sawmill in Australia

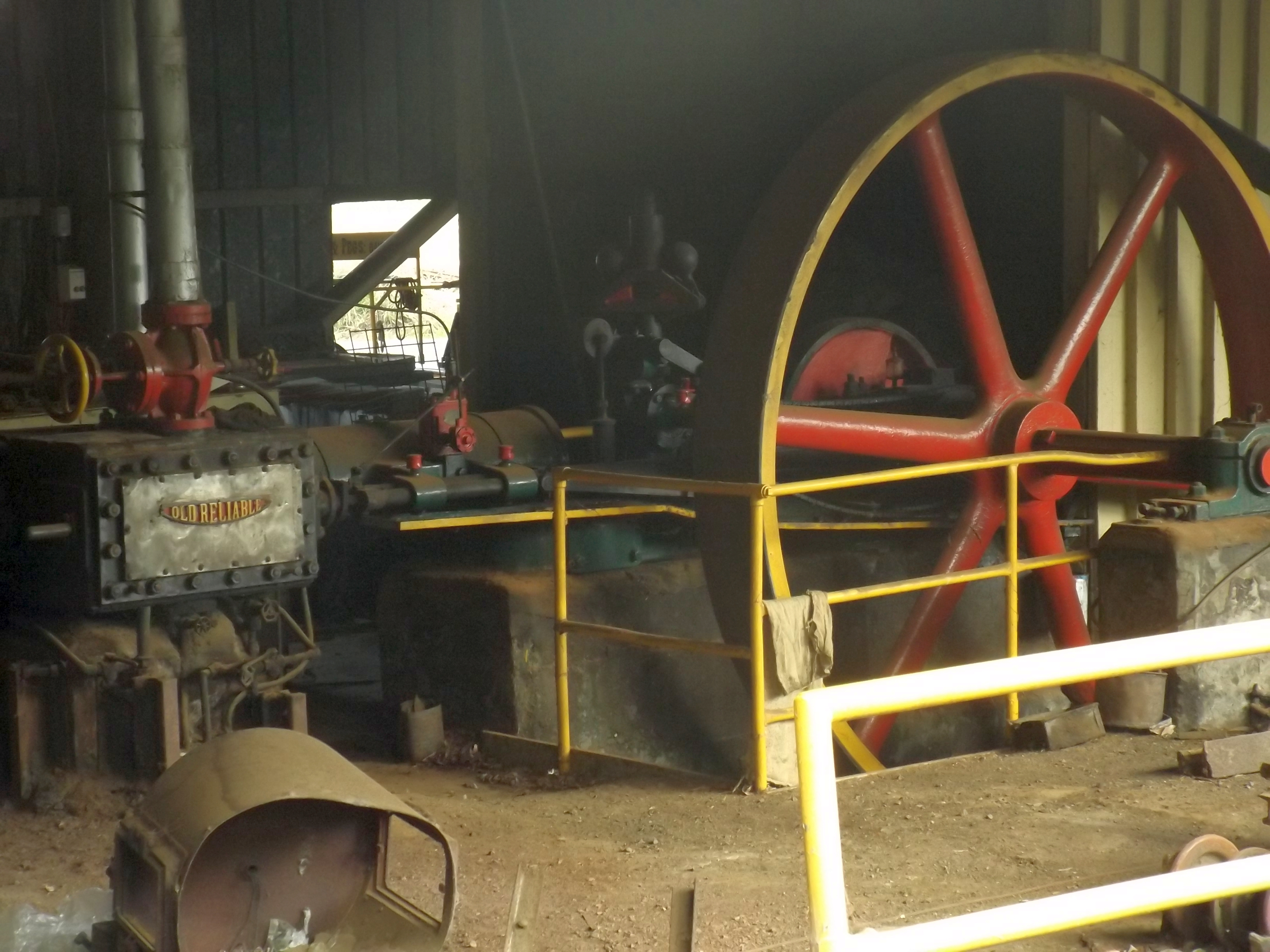
- Sawmill in 2015

- Location within Queensland Location within Australia
- 27.66°S 152.4678°E
- Location: Symes Street, Grandchester, City of Ipswich, Queensland, Australia

History
- Design period: 1939 - 1945 (World War II)
- Built: 1941

Queensland Heritage Register
- Official name: Grandchester Sawmills
- Type: state heritage (built)
- Designated: 21 October 1992
- Reference no.: 600730
- Significant period: 1941 (fabric); 1941-ongoing (historical/social)
- Significant components: silo, machinery/plant/equipment - forestry/timber industry, petrol - station, residential accommodation - housing, shed/s

Grandchester Sawmills is a heritage-listed sawmill business at Symes Street, Grandchester, City of Ipswich, Queensland, Australia. It was built in 1941. It was added to the Queensland Heritage Register on 21 October 1992.

== History ==
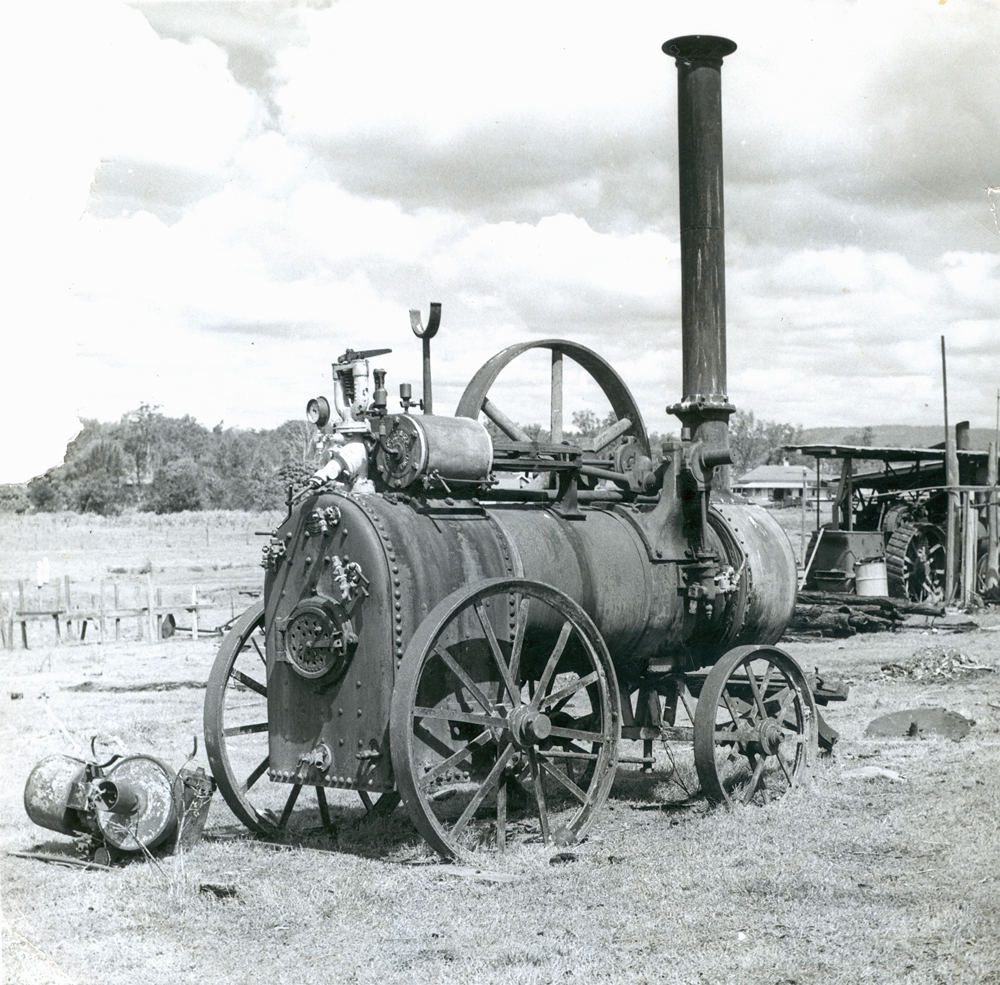
Grandchester sawmill steam engine, 1945

The Gillam brothers started the Grandchester Sawmills in 1941. While at this time World War II brought a severe reduction in housing activity, after a short resurgence when the depression lifted, the declaration of war with Japan at the end of 1941 was followed by a huge upsurge of construction for military purposes. As structures were needed quickly and were expected to be temporary, the demand for milled timber grew rapidly.

One of Queensland's earliest major industrial enterprises was William Pettigrew's sawmill in Brisbane. Opening in 1853, the sawmill predated the separation of Queensland as a colony by six years. Within two decades sawmills were commonplace and were an important investment in the regional economy.

The Grandchester sawmill is powered by steam and this factor makes it an unusual phenomenon in Queensland and Australia. The steam engine was built by "Marshall Sons & Co. Ltd, Engineers, Gainsborough, England." The date of construction is unclear, however a small plate records a machinery inspection in 1911. The steam engine was first used in the Nestle's factory in Toogoolawah (since demolished). It was then used in the Lowood butter factory and afterwards in the Hoods Sawmill, Gatton.

Initially, two traction engines were used for boilers but the brothers acquired the boiler of a No. 922 Ipswich based railway steam engine, built by Walkers Limited, Maryborough in 1966. The boiler is fuelled by sawdust from the circular saws and is a cheap and efficient method of power.

The mill is still operating, being a small family operation cutting mainly crating timber.

On 6 May 2007, the mill was damaged by fire. However, it is still operational and is being restored.

== Description ==
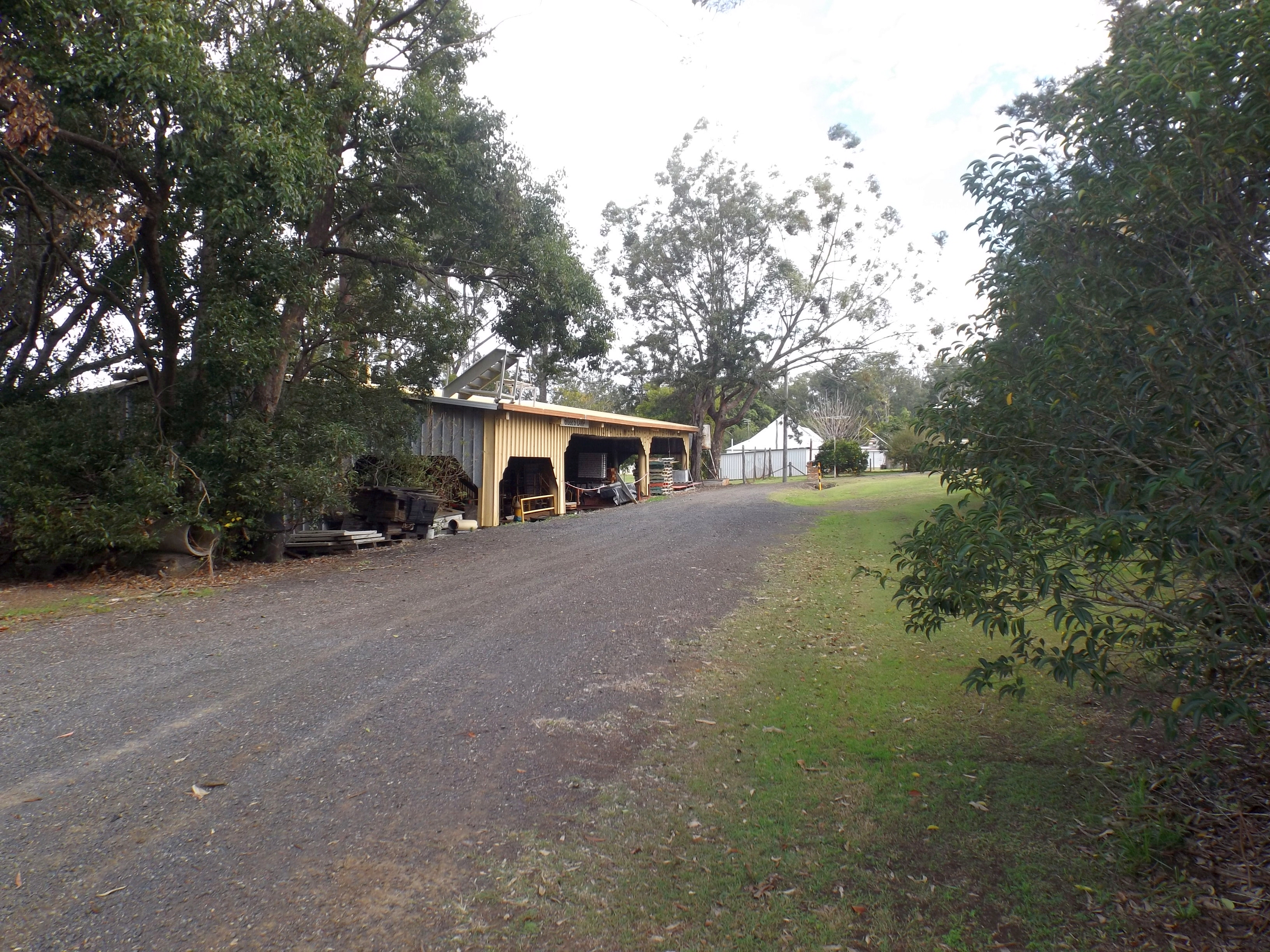
Machine shed, 2015

Grandchester Sawmills is located on the southern side of Symes Street in the town of Grandchester. The sawmill is set back from the road on a sloping piece of land which backs onto the Main Line railway. Grandchester railway station is visible from the rear of the sawmill.

The sawmill machinery is housed in a gabled structure with mono-pitched roof extension at one end under which the locomotive boiler sits minus its undercarriage. The sawn timber roof structure is supported on round timber posts. It is not enclosed by any walls. The mill is powered by a locomotive boiler from Walkers - built C17 No.922 and a steam engine. The boiler has a name plate attached to one side reading "Old Reliable".

The sawmill is driven by a belt and pulley system. All saws, except for one small electric saw, are powered by the steam engine. A small pyramidal silo stands to the rear of the main sawmill structure which is used to store the sawdust for the boiler.

Three other structures stand on the property. A timber house to the north-west of the mill, a small timber building directly in front (north) of the mill bearing evidence it was once a petrol station and another small timber structure to north-east of the sawmill.

== Heritage listing ==
Grandchester Sawmills was listed on the Queensland Heritage Register on 21 October 1992 having satisfied the following criteria.

The place is important in demonstrating the evolution or pattern of Queensland's history.

The timber industry has been a significant part of Queensland's history as timber getters were among the first Europeans to live and work in the colony. Grandchester Sawmills demonstrates the evolution of the timber in Queensland. The small sawmill was opened in 1941 at a time when the Second World War demanded increased production of sawn timber in Queensland. The continued success of the business is attributed to it responding to the changing demands for sawn timber in Queensland.

The place demonstrates rare, uncommon or endangered aspects of Queensland's cultural heritage.

The Grandchester Sawmills is one of the few remaining steam powered sawmills left in Queensland, if not Australia, still in commercial use. The machinery used to power the sawmill is uncommon and of high technological interest.

The place has a strong or special association with a particular community or cultural group for social, cultural or spiritual reasons.

The saw mill has a long association with the Gillam family and their employees being owned and run by them since 1941 to the present day.
