= Laidley Golf Club =

Golf club in Australia

- Interactive map of Laidley Golf Club
- 27°37′27″S 152°22′32″E

Club information
- Tournaments: Australian Open

Laidley Golf Club is a picturesque twelve hole golf course situated adjacent to Lake Dyer located on Gatton-Laidley Road, Laidley Heights, Shire of Laidley, Queensland, Australia. Officially opened in 1951 as a nine-hole course, it was extended to twelve holes during 2005. The golf course is 6074 metres in length.

== History ==
At a meeting held on 3 December 1928, it was decided to form a golf club to be known as the Laidley Golf Club. The Club held its Opening Day on Sunday 9 December 1928 on fourteen holes prepared at the Show Grounds. The best round of the day being 94. In April 1930 they had enough money to purchase sand and Dr Sweeney, the President, used reaping hook and lawn mower on the course and R E Allen & R A Ditton levelled the greens and spread sand. At the Annual Meeting held in March 1931, Mr. Watkins was congratulated on being the Club's first Club Champion and the holder of the course record of 72 for eighteen holes. The 1931 season was played on much improved links, but it was becoming increasingly evident that this ground was not suited for a golf course because of its limited area – about nine acres. In November 1931 it was decided to abandon the showgrounds and establish new links on the Recreation Reserve which was about forty acres in area, not more than 200 yards from the business area of the main street. The work of laying out the new links proceeded and full use was made of a gully which ran right through the reserve, providing a natural hazard for six holes. As the ground was perfectly level, the new links were a great improvement. Opening Day for these new links was held on Saturday 16 April 1932. In 1934 the first Associates Championship was won by Mrs. M.G. Watkin. In August 1935, R A Ditton, of Laidley, scooped the pool of golf events at Royal Queensland, winning the Country championship with a total of 168, the Royal Queensland Cup with an aggregate of 142, and tying in a Country Week handicap. He won by four shots over D. Von Nida. In 1938 it was decided to hold the Club's first Open Day on 23 October- this Open Day was to become an Annual Event.

From 1941 to 1946 the club was suspended, due to World War II. In March 1946 the club was reformed, but was short-lived. At a meeting in September 1948, it was decided to revive the game on new links at a new site, the old course now being no longer suitable. On 9 November 1948 the first step towards providing a golf course between Laidley and Forest Hill was taken, by putting down a deposit of £5 on land owned by Mr. Maurice Dayman, one mile from Laidley (now in the suburb of Laidley Heights). The sale of the land was finalised on 28 March 1949, and the site of the proposed new golf club at Laidley was stated to be the best seen for some time, by the golf architect (Mr. T. Southcombe) and the chairman of the Queensland Golf Council (Mr. D. Duncan). Both men were enthusiastic about the site's undulating terrain, soil, elevation and the scenic aspect of Dyer's Lake from the clubhouse. On Sunday 15 April 1951 the new course (and current site) was officially opened by the president of the Queensland Golf Council, Mr. W.G. Duncan, as he drove a ball down the first fairway of Laidley's new nine-hole golf course.
