= Laidley Creek West, Queensland =

Laidley Creek West
- Suburb
- Interactive map of Laidley Creek West
- Coordinates: 27.6675°S 152.3522°E
- Country: Australia
- State: Queensland
- LGA: Lockyer Valley Region
- Location: 7.6 km (4.7 mi) SW of Laidley; 23.1 km (14.4 mi) SSE of Gatton; 47.9 km (29.8 mi) W of Ipswich; 61.6 km (38.3 mi) ESE of Toowoomba; 92.0 km (57.2 mi) WSW of Brisbane

Government
  - State electorate: Lockyer
  - Federal division: Wright

Area
  - Total: 10.9 km^{2} (4.2 sq mi)
- Elevation: 110–390 m (360–1,280 ft)

Population
  - Total: 143 (2021 census)
  - Density: 13.12/km^{2} (33.98/sq mi)
- Time zone: UTC+10:00 (AEST)
- Postcode: 4341
Suburbs around Laidley Creek West
Blenheim	Laidley Heights	Laidley Heights
Blenheim	Laidley Creek West	Laidley South
Mount Berryman	Mulgowie	Mulgowie

Laidley Creek West is a rural locality in the Lockyer Valley Region, Queensland, Australia. In the 2021 census, Laidley Creek West had a population of 143 people.

== Geography ==
Laidley Creek forms most of the eastern boundary of the locality.

The land use is predominantly grazing on native vegetation with some irrigated horticulture alongside the creek.

== History ==
The locality was named on 3 June 1994. Its name is derived from Laidley Creek, which itself is derived from the naming of Laidleys Plain by Allan Cunningham on 22 June 1829, after James Laidley, the New South Wales Deputy Commissary General.

== Demographics ==
In the 2016 census, Laidley Creek West had a population of 145 people.

In the 2021 census, Laidley Creek West had a population of 143 people.

== Education ==
There are no schools in Laidley Creek West. The nearest government primary schools are Laidley District State School in Laidley to the north-east and Blenheim State School in neighbouring Blenheim to the west. The nearest government secondary school is Laidley State High School, also in Laidley.

== Attractions ==
Schultz Lookout is at the southern end of Schultz Lookout Road (27.6652°S 152.3462°E).
