= Summerholm, Queensland =

Summerholm
- Suburb
- Interactive map of Summerholm
- Coordinates: 27.61°S 152.4597°E
- Country: Australia
- State: Queensland
- LGA: Lockyer Valley Region
- Location: 14.5 km (9.0 mi) NE of Laidley; 21.8 km (13.5 mi) E of Gatton; 36.1 km (22.4 mi) W of Ipswich; 56.2 km (34.9 mi) E of Toowoomba; 73.6 km (45.7 mi) WSW of Brisbane

Government
  - State electorate: Lockyer
  - Federal division: Wright

Area
  - Total: 39.8 km^{2} (15.4 sq mi)

Population
  - Total: 646 (2021 census)
  - Density: 16.23/km^{2} (42.04/sq mi)
- Time zone: UTC+10:00 (AEST)
- Postcode: 4341
Suburbs around Summerholm
Plainland	Hatton Vale	Hatton Vale
Laidley North	Summerholm	Woolshed
Laidley	Grandchester	Grandchester

Summerholm is a rural locality in the Lockyer Valley Region, Queensland, Australia. In the 2021 census, Summerholm had a population of 646 people.

== Geography ==
The locality is bounded to the north by Woolshed Creek Road and to the south-east by Long Gully Road which loosely follows the course of Woolshed Creek. The locality's southern boundary is formed by the Main Line railway, but there are no railway stations serving the locality.

The terrain varies from 90 to 340 metres (300 to 1,120 ft) above sea level. There are no named peaks in the locality, apart from Lady Bowen Hill at the western end of Stokes Road (27.6616°S 152.4566°E) at 110 to 120 metres (360 to 390 ft).

The land use is a mixture of grazing on native vegetation and rural residential housing.

== History ==
Queensland's first section of railway was the Main Line railway from the original Ipswich railway station to Grandchester railway station. It was officially opened in July 1865 by the Governor of Queensland, George Bowen. As part of the opening ceremonies, there was a celebratory function held on a nearby hill (now within Summerholm) where the Governor's wife Lady Bowen planted a tree, leading to its name Lady Bowen Hill.

Summer Hill Provisional School opened on 2 September 1889 with 13 students under teacher Miss M. Hanley. On 1 January 1909, it became Summer Hill State School. It was on a 10-acre (4.0 ha) site at 61 Summerholm Road (27.61797°S 152.44964°E). In 1911, the school committee wanted to have the school relocated to a more central localition as the population of the district had moved further to the north. In 1937, a new school building was erected in a "central location" and officially opened on Saturday 17 April 1937 by Ted Maher, the Member of the Queensland Legislative Assembly for West Moreton. In 1944, it was renamed Summerholm State School. It closed circa 1955. It was at 51 Summerholm Road (27.60842°S 152.45015°E), approximately 1 kilometre (0.62 mi) north of the school's previous location. As at July 2023, the school building is still extant, but has been converted into a house.

== Demographics ==
In the 2016 census, Summerholm had a population of 639 people.

In the 2021 census, Summerholm had a population of 646 people.

== Education ==
There are no schools in Summerholm. The nearest government primary schools are Hatton Vale State School in neighbouring Hatton Vale to the north, Grandchester State School in neighbouring Grandchester to the south and Laidley District State School in neighbouring Laidley to the south-west. The nearest government secondary schools are Laidley State High School in neighbouring Laidley to the south-west and Rosewood State High School in Rosewood to the south-east.
