= Blenheim, Queensland =

Blenheim
- Suburb
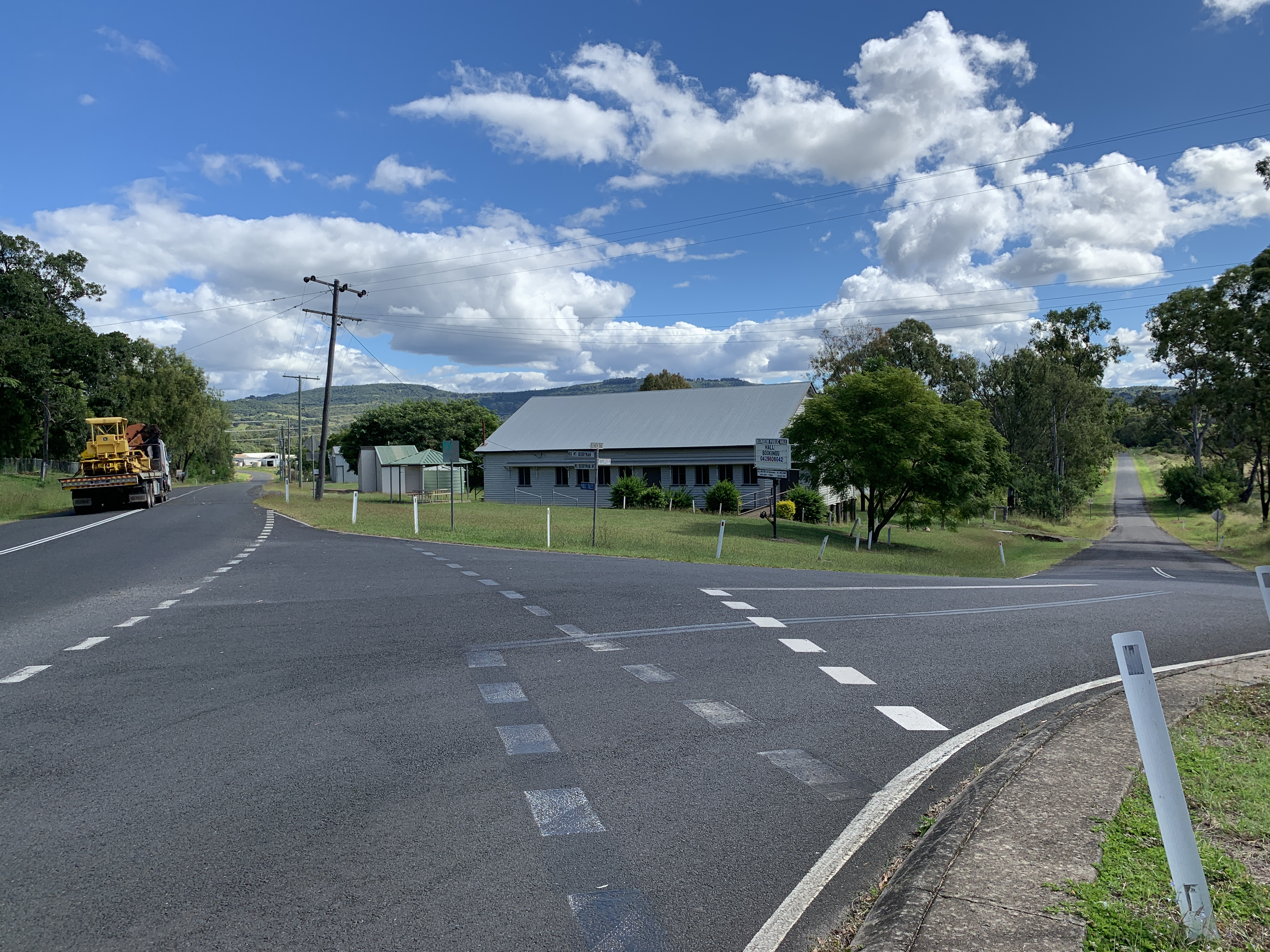
- View across Blenheim with the public hall in the foreground, 2024

- Interactive map of Blenheim
- Coordinates: 27.6558°S 152.3172°E
- Country: Australia
- State: Queensland
- LGA: Lockyer Valley Region
- Location: 7.4 km (4.6 mi) SW of Laidley; 16.4 km (10.2 mi) SE of Gatton; 50.2 km (31.2 mi) ESE of Toowoomba; 93 km (58 mi) WSW of Brisbane

Government
  - State electorate: Lockyer
  - Federal division: Wright

Area
  - Total: 35.9 km^{2} (13.9 sq mi)

Population
  - Total: 264 (2021 census)
  - Density: 7.354/km^{2} (19.05/sq mi)
- Time zone: UTC+10:00 (AEST)
- Postcode: 4341
Suburbs around Blenheim
Woodlands	Glen Cairn	Laidley Heights
Ropeley	Blenheim	Laidley Creek West
Rockside	Mount Berryman	Laidley Creek West

Blenheim is a rural locality in the Lockyer Valley Region, Queensland, Australia. In the 2021 census, Blenheim had a population of 264 people.

== Geography ==
Mantheys Knob is a mountain on the south-eastern boundary of the locality, rising 321 metres (1,053 ft) above sea level (27.6728°S 152.3397°E). Numerous small creeks flow from south to north within the locality.

Blenheim Road enters the locality from the north-east (Laidley Heights / Laidley Creek West) and then splits into Ropely Road which exits to the west (Ropeley) and Mount Berryman Road which exits to the south (Mount Berryman).

The land use is predominantly grazing on native vegetation with some irrigated horticulture. There is some rural residential housing mostly in the north-eastern part of the locality.

== History ==
Originally the district was known as Sandy Creek, but later it was named Blenheim after Blenheim Park in Oxfordshire, England, which was in turn named after the Battle of Blenheim.

Blenheim State School opened on 7 April 1879, with an initial enrolment of 73 pupils.

In 1895, a German Baptist church was established at Blenheim under the leadership of C. Muetzelburg. As time passed, the desire for German-language church services diminished and, due to falling numbers attending, the church was closed and physically relocated to Laidley.

Blenheim Lutheran Church opened on Sunday 31 March 1912. In 1938, it was relocated to Laidley to be used as a church hall for the Laidley Lutheran Church.

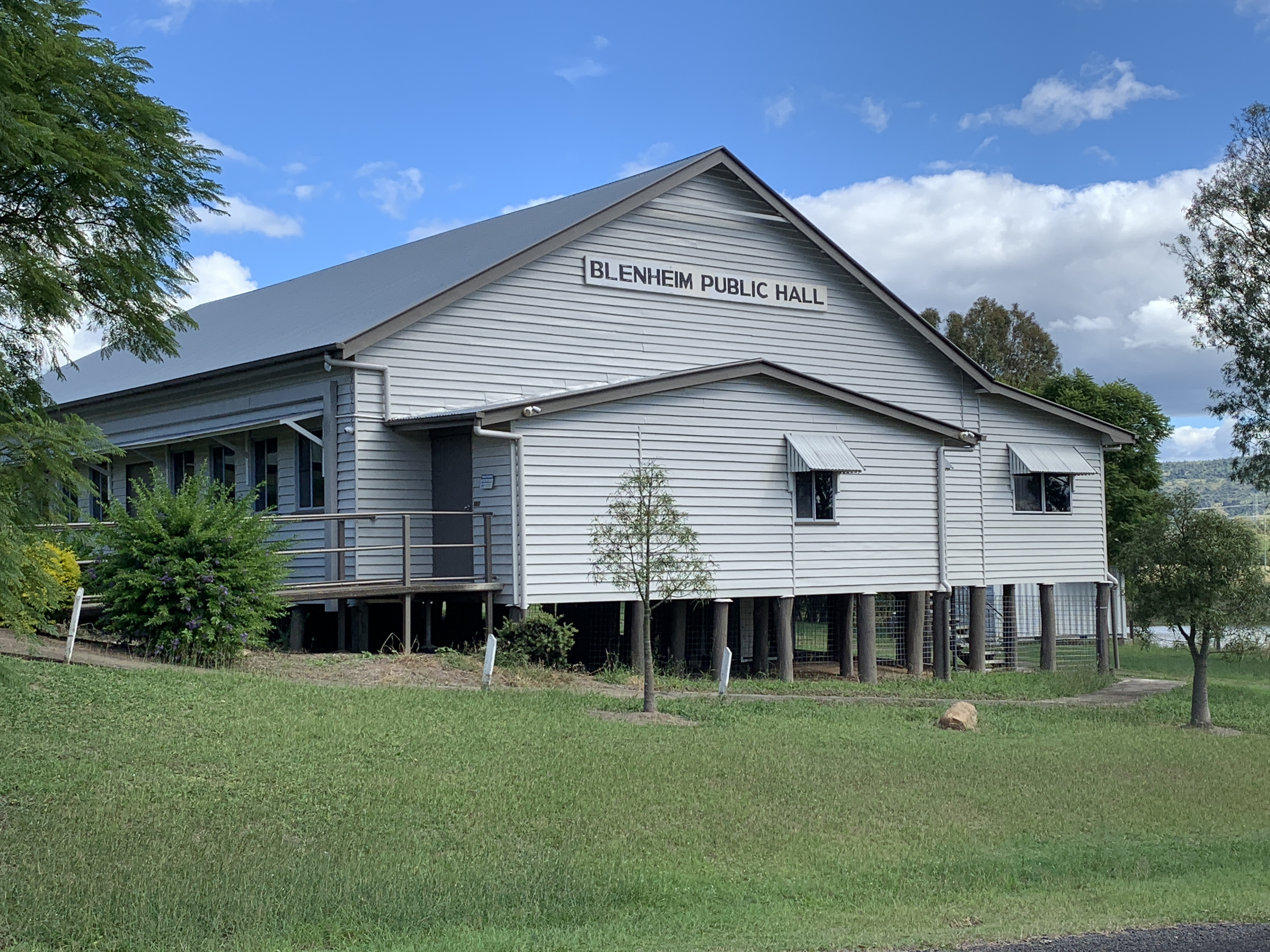
Blenheim Public Hall, 2024

Blenheim Public Hall was officially opened in August 1948 by Ted Maher, the member of the Queensland Legislative Assembly for West Moreton. It celebrated its 70th anniversary in August 2018. A mural commissioned for the opening of the building remains in display in the hall.

== Demographics ==
In the 2011 census, Blenheim had a population of 259 people.

In the 2016 census, Blenheim had a population of 291 people.

In the 2021 census, Blenheim had a population of 264 people.

== Heritage listings ==
- Blenheim State School, 81 Blenheim Road (27.6505°S 152.3313°E)

== Education ==
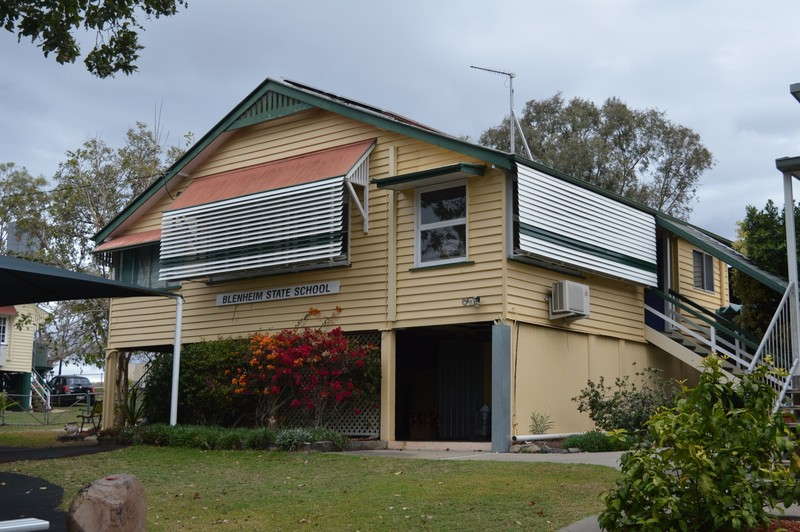
Blenheim State School, Block A, from north-west

Blenheim State School is a government primary (Prep–6) school for boys and girls at 81 Blenheim Road (27.6501°S 152.3317°E). In 2018, the school had an enrolment of 81 students with 5 teachers (4 full-time equivalent) and 5 non-teaching staff (4 full-time equivalent).

There are no secondary schools in Blenheim. The nearest government secondary schools are Laidley State High School in Laidley to the north-east and Lockyer District State High School in Gatton to the north-west.
