= Grandchester, Queensland =

Grandchester
- Town
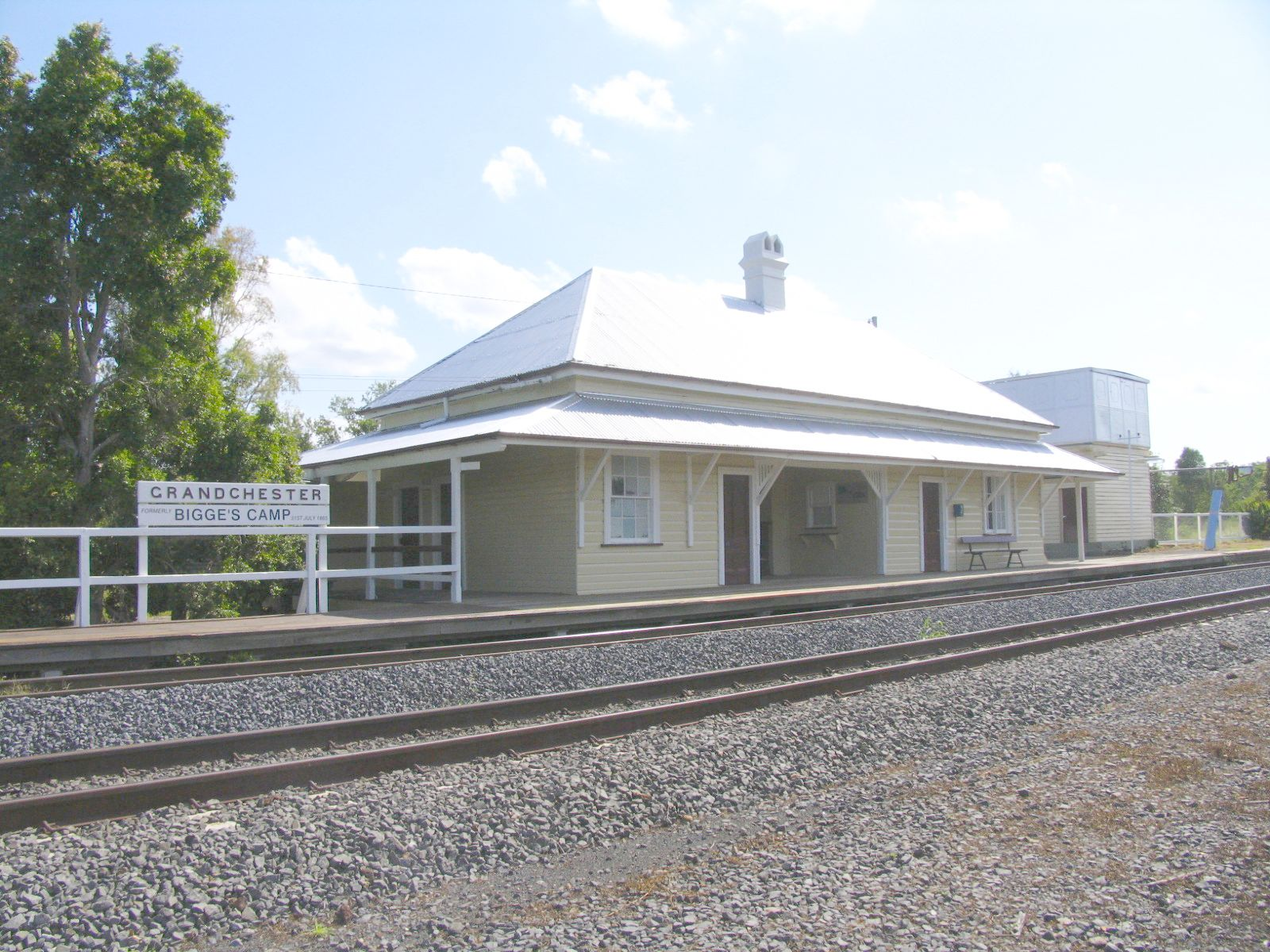
- Grandchester railway station

- Interactive map of Grandchester
- Coordinates: 27.6594°S 152.4672°E
- Country: Australia
- State: Queensland
- LGA: City of Ipswich
- Location: 10.4 km (6.5 mi) ESE of Laidley; 13.4 km (8.3 mi) W of Rosewood; 34.1 km (21.2 mi) W of Ipswich CBD; 75.5 km (46.9 mi) WSW of Brisbane CBD

Government
  - State electorates: Scenic Rim; Ipswich West
  - Federal division: Blair

Area
  - Total: 57.4 km^{2} (22.2 sq mi)

Population
  - Total: 467 (2021 census)
  - Density: 8.136/km^{2} (21.07/sq mi)
- Time zone: UTC+10:00 (AEST)
- Postcode: 4340
Localities around Grandchester
Laidley	Summerholm	Woolshed
Laidley South	Grandchester	Calvert
Mulgowie	Mount Mort	Lower Mount Walker

Grandchester is a rural town and locality in the City of Ipswich, Queensland, Australia. In the 2021 census, the locality of Grandchester had a population of 467 people.

== Geography ==
Grandchester is located 76 kilometres (47 mi) west of the Brisbane CBD.

The district historically known as Hidden Vale (or Hiddenvale) is within the locality, approx 6 kilometres (3.7 mi) south of the town of Grandchester where Hiddenvale Road has its junction with the Grandchester Mount Mort Road (27.715°S 152.470°E). Although unofficial, the name persists in the road name, St Anne's Hidden Vale (Anglican church), Spicers Hidden Vale (a rural resort), and the Hidden Vale Wildlife Centre (jointly operated by the resort and the University of Queensland).

The terrain varies from 70 to 347 metres (230 to 1,138 ft) above sea level. There is one named peak, Mount Grandchester, in the north of the locality (27.6327°S 152.4859°E) rising to 347 metres (1,138 ft). It is part of the Little Liverpool Range.

The land use is predominantly grazing on native vegetation.

The West Moreton section of the Main Line railway passes through the locality, entering from the east (Calvert), passing through the town of Grandchester, and exiting to the north-west (Laidley). The locality is served by two stations:

- Yarongmulu railway station, on the boundary with Laidley (27.6537°S 152.4216°E)
- Grandchester railway station, serving the town (27.6625°S 152.4660°E)

== History ==
The first settlers in the Grandchester area were Thomas and Maria Mort in 1849.

Grandchester was the initial terminus of the first narrow gauge mainline railway in the world. The first track opened to traffic on Monday 31 July 1865 from Ipswich, as the Queensland Government was keen to prove the viability of its controversial 'pony railway'. The choice of Ipswich as the starting point for the first rail line in Queensland was a testament to the importance of Ipswich in early Queensland. Coal was needed for steam trains and Ipswich's port was an inland freight centre. In Ipswich, this first line skirted north around the river, running through North Ipswich to enter a two-storey iron station, then on to the Bremer River wharf. This wharf handled rail freight until a railway line joining Ipswich to Brisbane was opened in 1875.

The construction of the Victoria Tunnel through the Little Liverpool Range to the west of Grandchester was behind schedule, and so, although it served a very small population, Bigge's Camp (as it was initially known) became the terminus for 10 months, until the line was extended to Gatton. The camp was named Bigge's Camp after local pioneer pastoralist Frederick Bigge. However, the name was changed on 30 August 1865 to be Grandchester, by translating the name into Latin, as bigge (Grand) and camp (Chester), which was suggested by the Governor George Bowen (a classicist) when the railway opened as being a more impressive name for the first railway terminus in Queensland. The original Grandchester railway station, including the former station master's residence, still exists.

Grandchester Post Office opened on 1 January 1866 after the arrival of the railway and closed in 1978.

Grandchester Provisional School opened in November 1870 in a tent borrowed from the Queensland Government, but which closed after one month in December 1870.

Granchester State School opened on 29 January 1878.

Our Lady of the Most Holy Rosary Roman Catholic Church was officially opened in November 1894 by Archbishop Robert Dunne. The timber church was 45 by 25 feet (13.7 by 7.6 m) with the wall 12 feet (3.7 m) high. It was designed by Ipswich architect Henry E. Wyman and was built by James Madden at a cost of £130 on the site of the former Jockey Club Hotel at 7-9 George Street (27.66103°S 152.46505°E). By 1912, the church had become known as St Peter's. It was closed and sold in 2022.

Hidden Vale Provisional School opened on 10 July 1916. On 1 September 1919, it became Hidden Vale State School. It closed on 15 February 1943. It was at 779-799 Hiddenvale Road (27.7138°S 152.4707°E).

On Sunday 18 July 1937, St Anne's Anglican Church was officially dedicated by Archdeacon H.W.H. Stevenson.

Grandchester Sawmills is one of the last known surviving steam-powered flat-belt sawmills in Australia. The engine powering it was manufactured in 1908, and the mill has been in operation from 1945. It was destroyed by a fire, sometime in the early hours of 6 May 2007. Work on the long process of restoring the mill to its former glory started almost immediately in the days following the fire. The mill is operating once again with work still continuing on the restoration. This will ensure that this important piece of history is preserved for the generations that follow.

== Demographics ==
In the 2011 census, the locality of Grandchester had a population of 504 people.

In the 2016 census, the locality of Grandchester had a population of 444 people.

In the 2021 census, the locality of Grandchester had a population of 467 people.

== Heritage listings ==
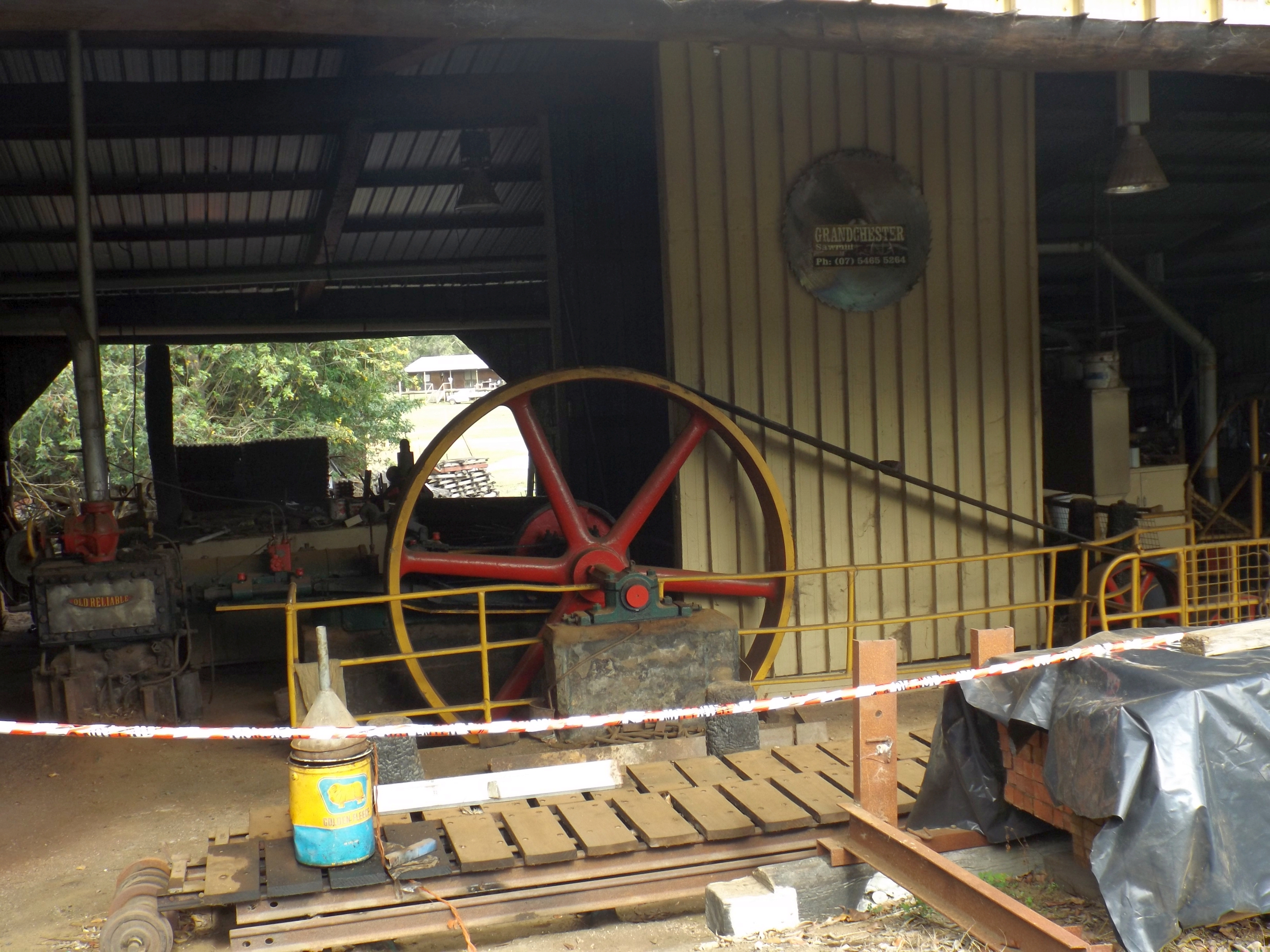
Grandchester Sawmills, 2015

Grandchester has a number of heritage-listed sites, including:

- Franklyn Vale Homestead, Franklin Vale Road
- Grandchester railway station, Ipswich Road
- Grandchester Sawmills, Symes Street

== Education ==
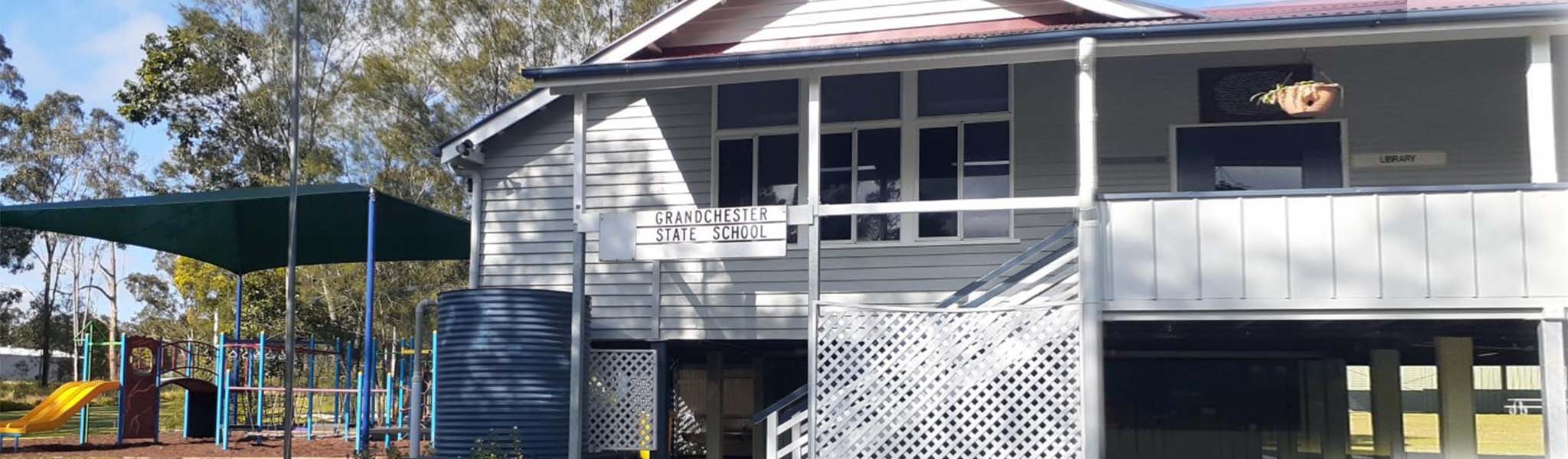
Grandchester State School, 2024

Grandchester State School is a government primary (Prep-6) school for boys and girls at 35 School Road (27.6655°S 152.4653°E). In 2017, the school had an enrolment of 37 students with 6 teachers (3 full-time equivalent) and 5 non-teaching staff (3 full-time equivalent).

There are no secondary schools in Grandchester. The nearest government secondary schools are Laidley State High School in neighbouring Laidley to the north-west and Rosewood State High School in Rosewood to the east.

== Amenities ==
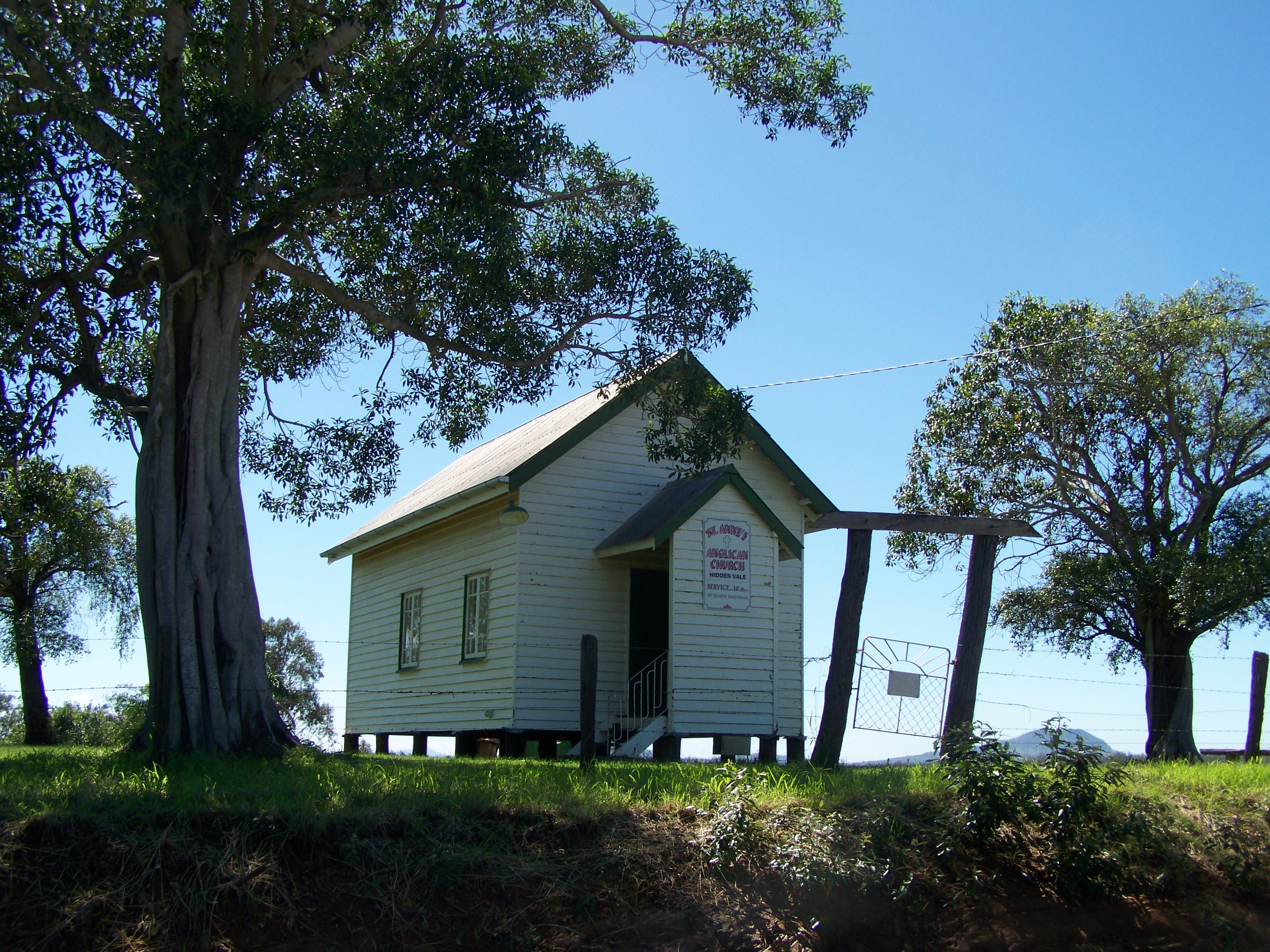
St Anne's Anglican Church

The Ipswich City Council operates a fortnightly mobile library service which visits the Grandchester Hotel.

St Anne's Anglican Church at 798 Hiddenvale Road (27.7155°S 152.4700°E) holds monthly services. It is part of the Rosewood Anglican Parish.

== See also ==
- Rosewood
- Rail transport in Queensland
- Victoria Tunnel, Queensland
