= Laidley South, Queensland =

Laidley South
- Suburb
- Interactive map of Laidley South
- Coordinates: 27.6911°S 152.3869°E
- Country: Australia
- State: Queensland
- LGA: Lockyer Valley Region
- Location: 6.3 km (3.9 mi) SSW of Laidley; 22.3 km (13.9 mi) SE of Gatton; 45.7 km (28.4 mi) W of Ipswich; 64.8 km (40.3 mi) ESE of Toowoomba; 87.1 km (54.1 mi) WSW of Brisbane

Government
  - State electorate: Lockyer
  - Federal divisions: Wright; Blair

Area
  - Total: 20.1 km^{2} (7.8 sq mi)
- Elevation: 110–300 m (360–980 ft)

Population
  - Total: 293 (2021 census)
  - Density: 14.58/km^{2} (37.75/sq mi)
- Time zone: UTC+10:00 (AEST)
- Postcode: 4341
Suburbs around Laidley South
Laidley Heights	Laidley	Grandchester
Laidley Creek West	Laidley South	Grandchester
Laidley Creek West	Mulgowie	Mulgowie

Laidley South is a rural locality in the Lockyer Valley Region, Queensland, Australia. In the 2021 census, Laidley South had a population of 293 people.

== Geography ==
As the name suggests, Laidley South is immediately south of the town of Laidley. Laidley South is bounded to the west by Laidley Creek and to the east by the Little Liverpool Range.

The land use is mixed. In the north of the locality is rural residential housing. In the west of the locality along the creek is mostly irrigated horticulture. The main major land use in the centre and south of the locality is grazing on native vegetation. In the east of the locality, many of the slopes of the Little Liverpool Range remains as undeveloped land due to the more mountainous elevations.

The Laidley Creek Diversion Weir on Laidley Creek (27.66078°S 152.37339°E) enables some of the water flowing along Laidley Creek to be piped to Lake Dyer in neighbouring Laidley Heights for water storage.

== History ==
The locality's name is derived from the town name of Laidley, which itself derives from the naming of Laidleys Plain by Allan Cunningham after James Laidley (1786-1835), the New South Wales Deputy Commissary General.

Laidley State School opened on 1 April 1864. In 1888, it was renamed Laidley South State School. The school closed on 9 December 1983. It was on Mulgowie Road (27.6798°S 152.3740°E).

The Laidley Valley railway line from Laidley to Mulgowie was opened on Wednesday 19 April 1911 by the Queensland Treasurer, Walter Barnes, with Laidley South being served by three stations (from north to south)

- Coopers Hill railway station (27.6572°S 152.3847°E), named after a long-time local resident and farmer
- Goothenda railway station (27.6705°S 152.3775°E), named using an Aboriginal word meaning forest country
- Paree railway station (27.6938°S 152.3711°E), named using an Aboriginal word meaning black soil

Due to poor patronage and improvements to the local roads, the line was closed in 1955, apart from 1.3 kilometres (0.81 mi) of the line which connected to the Laidley cattle yards which remained in use until 1969.

== Demographics ==
In the 2016 census, Laidley South had a population of 271 people.

In the 2021 census, Laidley South had a population of 293 people.

== Education ==
There are no schools in Laidley South. The nearest government primary school is Laidley District State School in neighbouring Laidley to the north. The nearest government secondary school is Laidley State High School, also in Laidley.
