= Laidley North, Queensland =

Laidley North
- Suburb
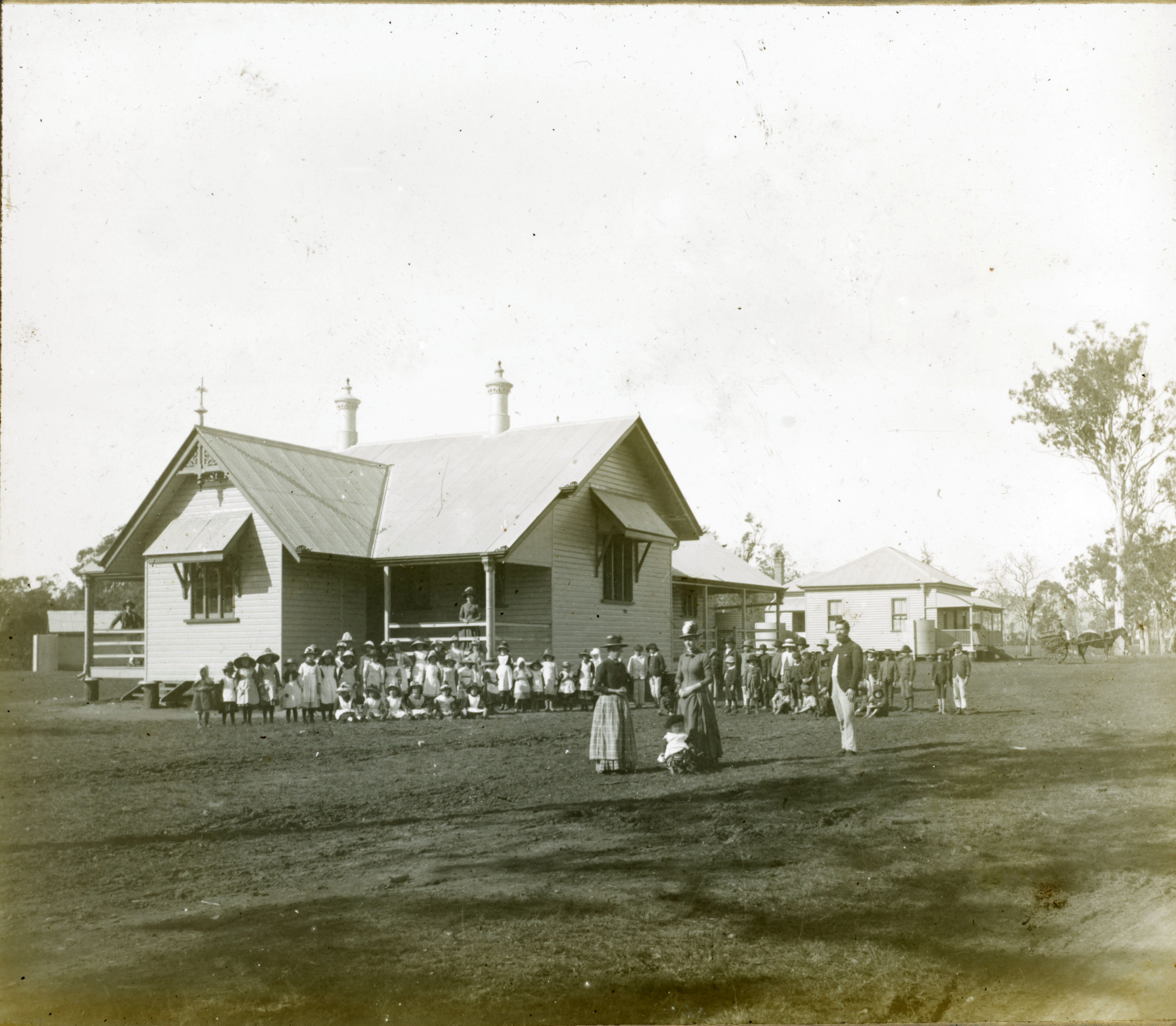
- Teachers and pupils outside Laidley North State School and residence, circa 1889

- Interactive map of Laidley North
- Coordinates: 27.6122°S 152.4075°E
- Country: Australia
- State: Queensland
- LGA: Lockyer Valley Region
- Location: 2.1 km (1.3 mi) N of Laidley; 16.7 km (10.4 mi) SE of Gatton; 44.8 km (27.8 mi) W of Ipswich; 56.5 km (35.1 mi) E of Toowoomba; 82.2 km (51.1 mi) WSW of Brisbane

Government
  - State electorate: Lockyer
  - Federal division: Wright

Area
  - Total: 15.3 km^{2} (5.9 sq mi)

Population
  - Total: 593 (2021 census)
  - Density: 38.76/km^{2} (100.4/sq mi)
- Time zone: UTC+10:00 (AEST)
- Postcode: 4341
Suburbs around Laidley North
Forest Hill	Plainland	Summerholm
Forest Hill	Laidley North	Summerholm
Laidley Heights	Laidley	Laidley

Laidley North is a rural locality in the Lockyer Valley Region, Queensland, Australia. In the 2021 census, Laidley North had a population of 593 people.

== Geography ==
As the name suggests, Laidley North is immediately north of the town of Laidley.

The locality is bounded to the south-west by Laidley Creek.

The land use is mixed. Being close to Laidley, there is some rural residential housing and some suburban housing. Land near the Laidley Creek is used for irrigated horticulture. Apart from these, the predominant land use is grazing on native vegetation.

Laidley–Plainland Road runs through from south to north.

== History ==
The locality's name is derived from the town name of Laidley, which derives from the naming of Laidleys Plain by explorer Allan Cunningham after James Laidley, the New South Wales Deputy Commissary General.

Laidley North Mixed State School opened on 1 April 1889. In 1897, the name was changed to Laidley North State School. A secondary department operated from 1964 to 1984 (after which a separate Laidley State High School opened in 1985 on another site). Laidley North State School closed on 12 December 1998, but Laidley District State School (an amalgamation of Laidley North State School and Laidley Central State School) opened on the Laidley North State School site in 1999. The school site is now within the boundaries of Laidley at 218-220 Patrick Street (27.6243°S 152.3955°E).

== Demographics ==
In the 2016 census, Laidley North had a population of 408 people.

In the 2021 census, Laidley North had a population of 593 people.

== Education ==
There are no schools in Laidley North. The nearest government primary schools are Laidley District State School in neighbouring Laidley to the south and Forest Hill State School in neighbouring Forest Hill to the west. The nearest government secondary school is Laidley State High School in Laidley to the south.

== Amenities ==
Laidley Cultural Centre is at 3 Laidley Plainland Road (27.6133°S 152.3975°E). It is operated by the Lockyer Valley Regional Council.

The Laidley District Cricket Club plays at the Bichel Oval on the Laidley Plainland Road (27.6141°S 152.3971°E).

== Facilities ==
In the north of the locality is the 184-hectare (450-acre) Darbalara Farm operated by the University of Queensland's Gatton campus (27.5953°S 152.3854°E).The university's School of Veterinary Science uses the farm to maintains a Droughtmaster herd and other beef cattle as part of its teaching and research programs.

The Laidley Sewerage Treatment Plant is in Brahman Road (27.6109°S 152.4065°E). It is operated by Queensland Urban Utilities.
