= James Laidley (administrator) =

Deputy commissary general (1786–1835)

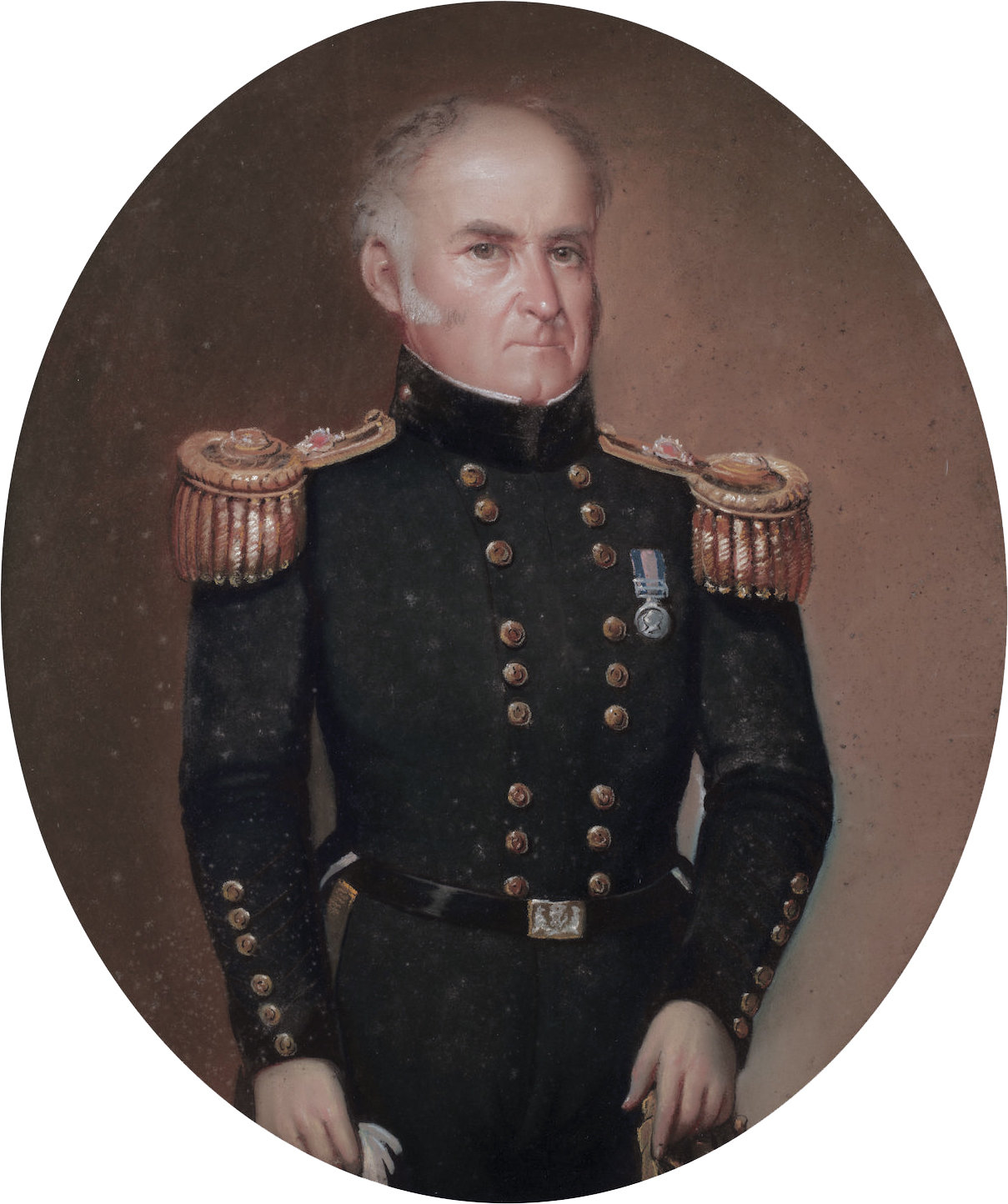
James Laidley (1786–1835)

James Laidley (1786–1835) was a British-born administrator in the colony of New South Wales (later a state of Australia). He was Deputy Commissary General in Sydney.

== Early life ==
James Laidley was born in March 1786 in Perthshire, Scotland, the son of John and Sarah Laidley. He married Eliza Jane Shepheard in Bridgetown, Saint Michael, Barbados, on 18 October 1810.

== Later life ==
Laidley died on Sunday 30 August 1835 at his residence in Darlinghurst, Sydney after a short illness. His funeral process left from his home on Tuesday 1 September 1835 for the General Burying Ground where the service was "impressively" conducted by the Rev. Richard Hill.

== Legacy ==
On 22 June 1829, explorer and botanist Allan Cunningham named the Laidley Plains (now in Queensland) after James Laidley. Although the name Laidley Plains is no longer in use, it gave its name in turn to many places in that area including the town of Laidley, Laidley Creek, Laidley Gap, and the localities of Laidley North, Laidley South, Laidley Heights and Laidley Creek West.

His son James Turquand Laidley would later hold property in Mount Mort (near Laidley), Queensland with his brother-in-law Henry Mort.
