= Bill Gunn Dam =

Dam in South East Queensland, Australia

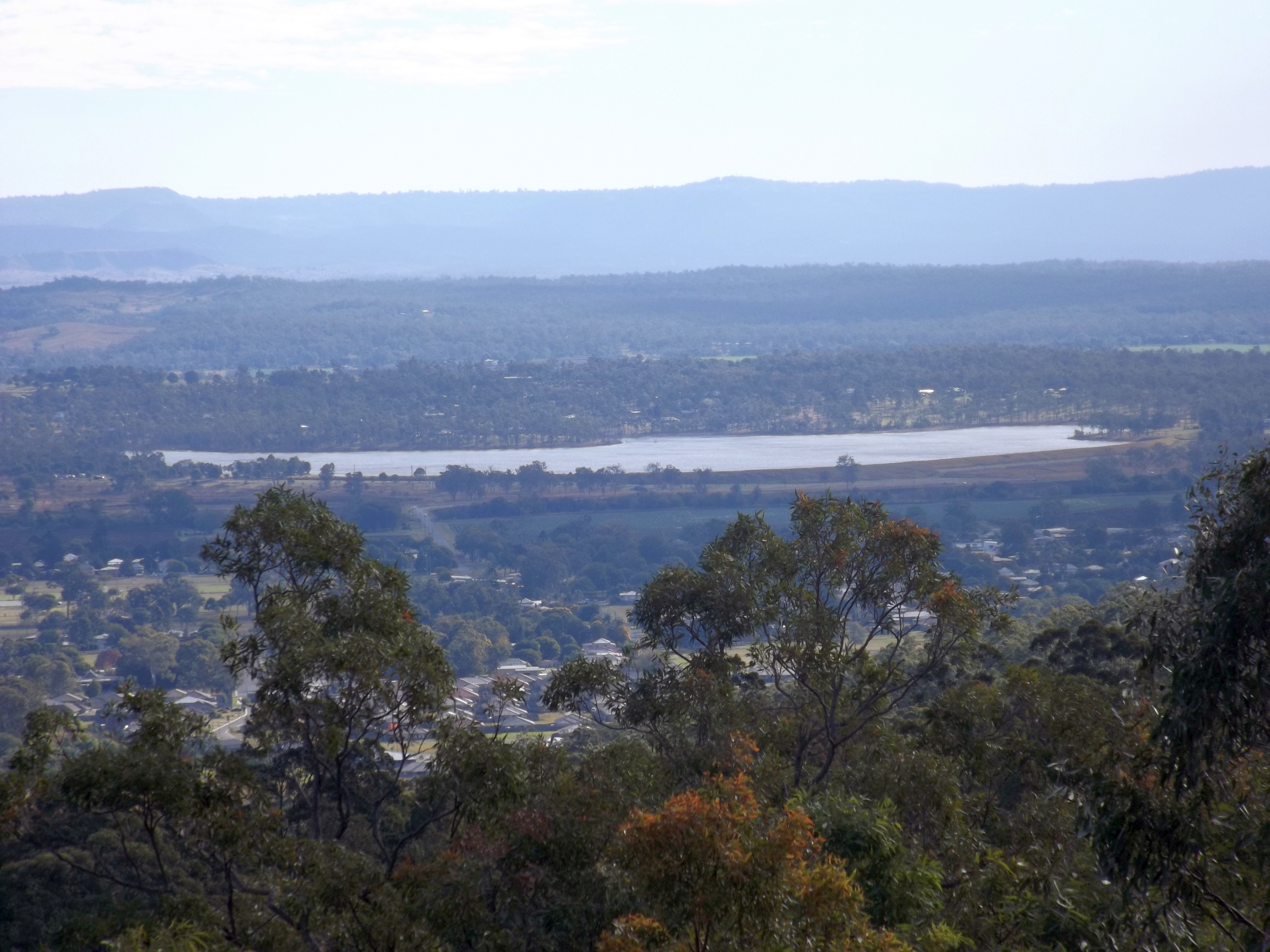
- View from Cunninghams Crest Lookout

- Location of the Bill Gunn Dam in Queensland
- Country: Australia
- Location: South East Queensland
- Coordinates: 27°37′40″S 152°22′37″E
- Purpose: Irrigation
- Status: Operational
- Opening date: 1987
- Operator: SEQ Water

Dam and spillways
- Type of dam: Earth fill dam
- Impounds: Off-stream
- Height: 18 m (59 ft)
- Length: 1,160 m (3,810 ft)
- Dam volume: 722×10^{3} m^{3} (25.5×10^{6} cu ft)
- Spillway type: Uncontrolled
- Spillway capacity: 5 m^{3}/s (180 cu ft/s)

Reservoir
- Creates: Lake Dyer
- Total capacity: 6,940 ML (1,530×10^{6} imp gal; 1,830×10^{6} US gal)
- Catchment area: 3 km^{2} (1.2 sq mi)
- Surface area: 100 ha (250 acres)
- Maximum length: 1,100 m (3,600 ft)
- Maximum width: 600 m (2,000 ft)
- Maximum water depth: 10.7 m (35 ft)
- Normal elevation: 110 m (360 ft) AHD
- Website www.seqwater.com.au

The Bill Gunn Dam is an earth-fill embankment dam with an un-gated spillway located off-stream in Laidley Heights in the South East region of Queensland, Australia. The main purpose of the dam is for irrigation of the Lockyer Valley. The resultant reservoir is called Lake Dyer.

== Location and features ==
Located 1.5 kilometres (0.93 mi) west of the town of Laidley, the dam was developed to increase the capacity of the existing Lake Dyer, a natural lake adjacent to Laidley Creek, a tributary of Lockyer Creek. The dam was named after the Queensland politician Bill Gunn and is managed by SEQ Water.

The 1,170 m (3,840 ft) long earthfill structure has a maximum height of 12 m (39 ft) and an overflow spillway which diverts excess water into Laidley Creek. The dam has a storage capacity of 6,950 megalitres (1,530×10^{6} imp gal; 1,840×10^{6} US gal) and a maximum surface area of 108 hectares (270 acres).

Water from the dam is used for irrigation, in the densely cropped Lockyer Valley. Bill Gunn Dam suffers from high drawdowns and summer evaporation which together with phosphate fertilizer creates significant blue green algae problems. In November 2005, during drought conditions in the area, the dam's water level declined to just 1%.

== Recreation ==
A boating permit is not required, however a maximum of eight boats are allowed on the lake at once. A single concrete boat ramp and some facilities for visitors, including campers, are available at a lakeside caravan park which is managed by the local council.

The dam is stocked with silver perch and golden perch, while bony bream, spangled perch and eel-tailed catfish breed naturally. A Stocked Impoundment Permit is required to fish in the dam. The poor water quality means that fish caught in the dam may, at times of an algae outbreak, be a health hazard if eaten.

== See also ==
- List of dams in Queensland
