= Victoria Tunnel, Queensland =

Victoria Tunnel
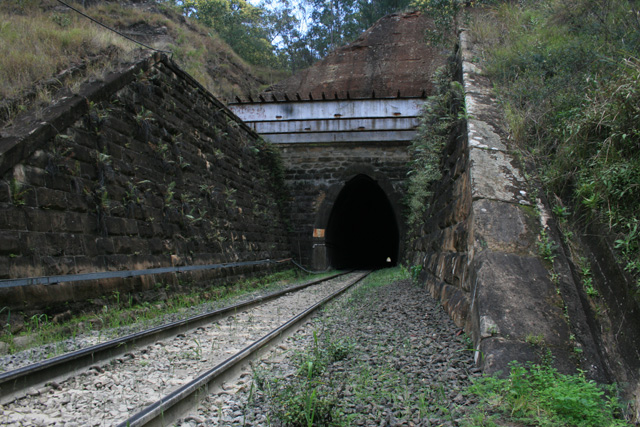
- Eastern entrance, 2010

Overview
- Location: Grandchester, Queensland, Australia
- Coordinates: 27°39′19.67″S 152°25′31.24″E
- Route: Grandchester to Gatton Narrow gauge railway

Operation
- Opened: June 1866
- Operator: Queensland Railways
- Traffic: Train
- Character: Passenger, Freight

Technical
- Length: 537 metres (1,762 ft)

The Victoria Tunnel is a railway tunnel located in Queensland, Australia. At 537 metres (1,762 ft), the tunnel is the longer of the two oldest railway tunnels in Queensland, the other being known as the 'Six Chain', either because it is 6 chains (400 ft; 120 m) long, or is situated entirely on a 6-chain (400 ft; 120 m) radius curve, or both. Both are situated on the Main Line from Brisbane to Toowoomba, being part of the first narrow gauge main line in the world.

The Victoria Tunnel was named in honour of Queen Victoria, the reigning Australian monarch at the time of the tunnel's construction.

== History ==
The 537-metre-long (1,762 ft) tunnel (together with 'Six Chain') was built through the Little Liverpool Range on a section of narrow gauge railway from Grandchester to Gatton. The railway opened in June 1866, being delayed when the excavation of the tunnel revealed unexpected geological difficulties, requiring the tunnel to be lined with 3 layers of bricks. That resulted in the tunnel having restricted clearances, which limits the loading gauge (size of rolling stock) on this section of the Queensland Railways network, and the floor of the tunnel was lowered by 150 millimetres (5.9 in) in 1985 to improve that situation.

=== Tunnel floor lowering ===
There are a total of 11 single track tunnels on the line between Ipswich and Toowoomba, all built around the same time in 1865, all with a tight profile that are too small to take 2.9-metre-high (9.5 ft) ISO shipping containers. It is now proposed to improve the loading gauge of these tunnels by lowering the floors.

== See also ==
- List of tunnels in Australia
