= James Laidley =

Australian politician

James Laidley JP
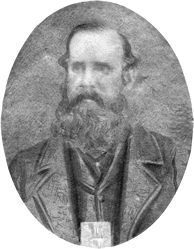

Member of the Queensland Legislative Council
- In office 1 May 1860 – 16 August 1864

Personal details
- Born: James Turquand Laidley; 1823 Sydney, New South Wales, Australia
- Died: 1877 (aged 53–54) Woollahra, New South Wales, Australia
- Spouse: Mary Weston (m.1848)
- Occupation: Station owner

James Turquand Laidley (1823 – 29 March 1877) was a pastoralist and Member of the Queensland Legislative Council in the colony of Queensland (later a state of Australia).

== Early life ==
James Turquand Laidley was born in 1823 in Sydney, New South Wales, the son of James Laidley and Eliza Jane (née Shepheard).

== Pastoralism ==
Laidley acquired Western Creek Station on the Darling Downs in 1848. From 1849 to 1879 he was in partnership with his brother-in-law Henry Mort (married to Laidley's sister Maria) in a pastoral property called Franklyn Vale at Mount Mort, Queensland.

== Politics ==
Laidley was appointed to the Queensland Legislative Council on the 1 May 1860 and served until his resignation on the 16 August 1864.

== Later life ==
Laidley died on 29 March 1877 at his home at Ocean Street, Woollahra, Sydney, aged 53 years old. His funeral left his home on Saturday 31 March 1877.
