= Laidley Heights, Queensland =

Laidley Heights
- Suburb
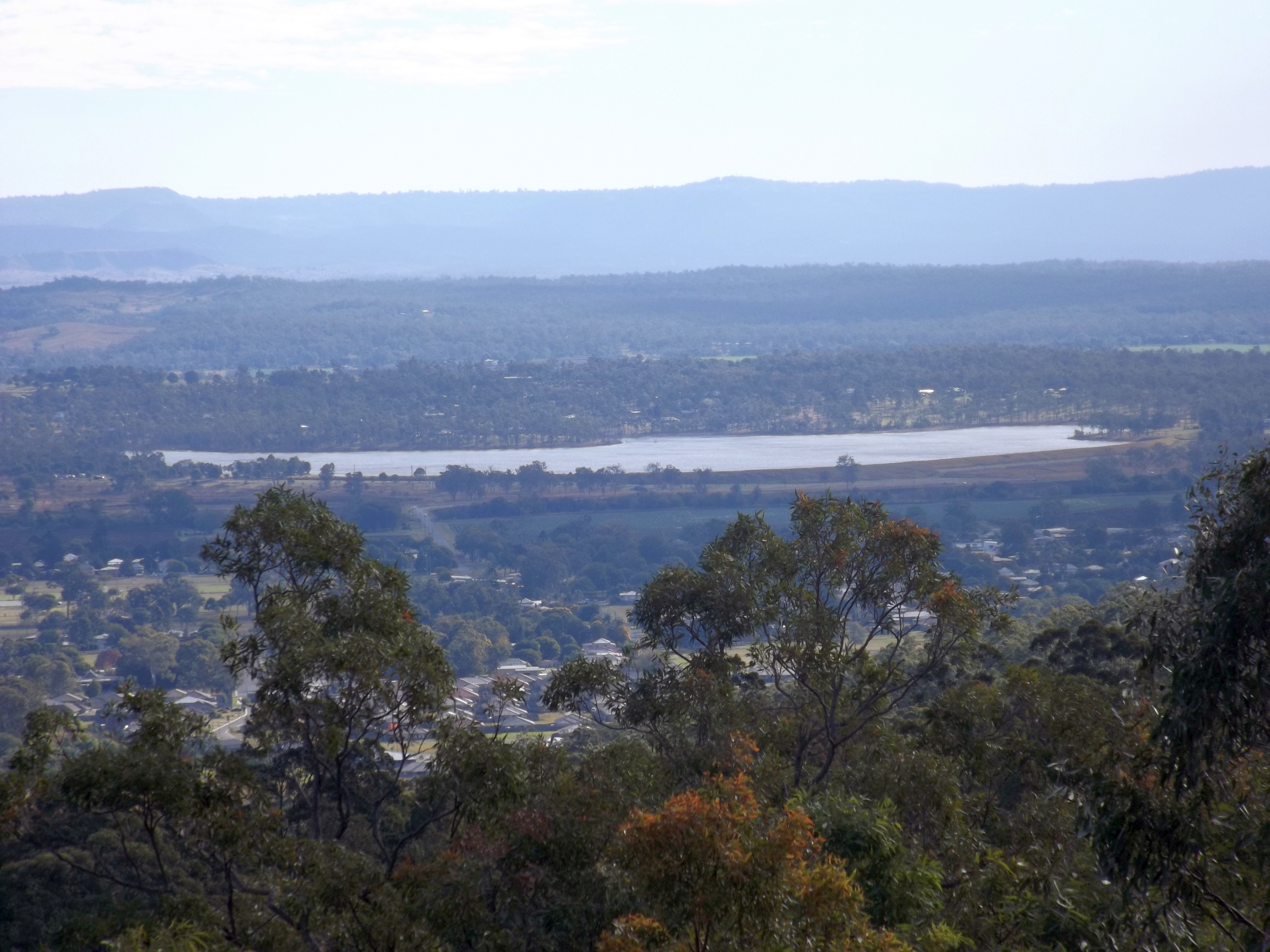
- Looking across Laidley Heights over Lake Dyer, 2015

- Interactive map of Laidley Heights
- Coordinates: 27.6291°S 152.3688°E
- Country: Australia
- State: Queensland
- LGA: Lockyer Valley Region
- Location: 5.8 km (3.6 mi) W of Laidley; 15.6 km (9.7 mi) SE of Gatton; 48.5 km (30.1 mi) W of Ipswich; 55.2 km (34.3 mi) E of Toowoomba; 91.4 km (56.8 mi) WSW of Brisbane

Government
  - State electorate: Lockyer
  - Federal division: Wright

Area
  - Total: 16.1 km^{2} (6.2 sq mi)
- Elevation: 100–160 m (330–520 ft)

Population
  - Total: 1,429 (2021 census)
  - Density: 88.76/km^{2} (229.9/sq mi)
- Time zone: UTC+10:00 (AEST)
- Postcode: 4341
Suburbs around Laidley Heights
Forest Hill	Forest Hill	Laidley North
Glen Cairn	Laidley Heights	Laidley
Blenheim	Laidley Creek West	Laidley South

Laidley Heights is a rural residential locality on the outskirts of the town of Laidley in the Lockyer Valley Region, Queensland, Australia. In the 2021 census, Laidley Heights had a population of 1,429 people.

== Geography ==
The locality is bounded to the east by Laidley Creek.

Lake Dyer is in the east of the locality (27.6288°S 152.3753°E). Although it is a natural lake, its capacity to store water was increased by the construction of the Bill Gunn Dam (27.6281°S 152.3804°E), a 1,050-metre (3,440 ft) earth embankment with a central clay core. As well as the natural inflows to the lake, additional water from Laidley Creek is redirected into Lake Dyer for storage. It is an ungated dam so it commences spilling whenever it is full.

The land use is a mix of rural residential housing in the central areas of the locality, irrigated horticulture in the east along the creek, and grazing on native vegetation in the remainder of the locality.

== History ==
The locality was named after the town of Laidley, which, in turn, was derived from the naming of Laidleys Plain by Allan Cunningham after James Laidley New South Wales Deputy Commissary General.

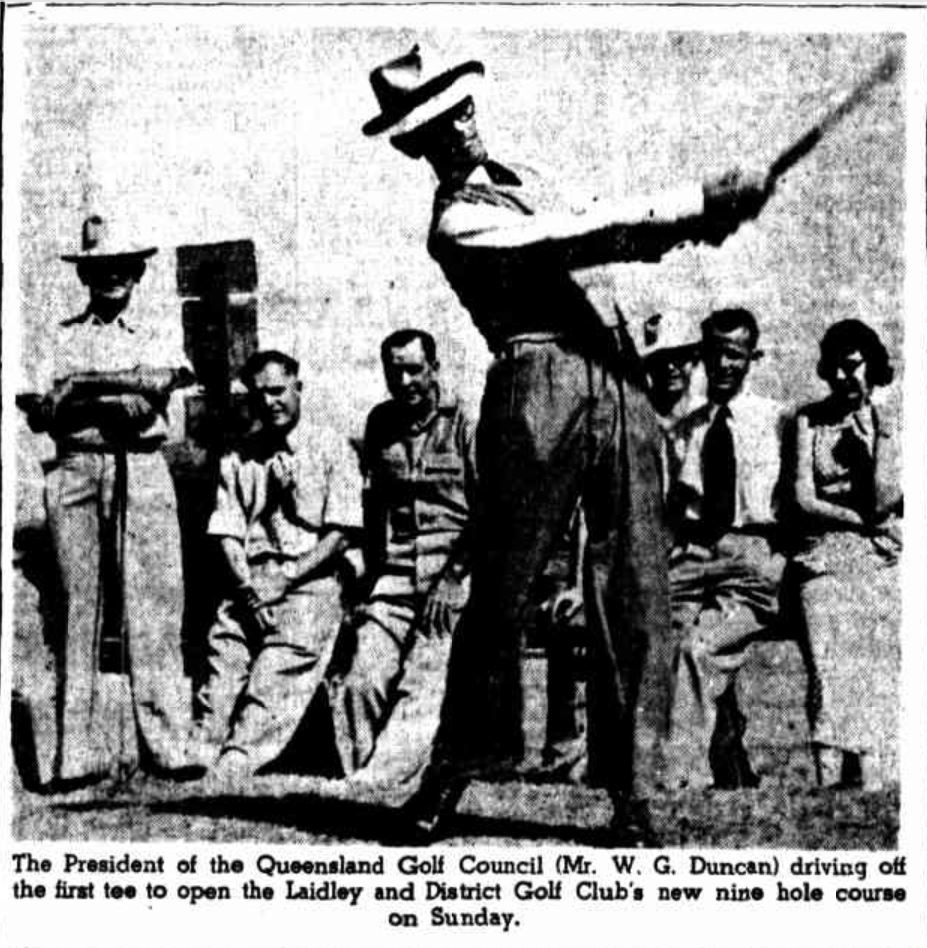
Official opening of the Laidley and District Golf Club's new nine-hole course, Sunday 15 April 1951

Laidley Golf Club opened on 9 December 1928 with a few holes on the Laidley Showgrounds. Due to the popularity of the golf club, in 1931, the club decided to establish a new golf course on the Laidley Recreational Reserve (now Anzac Park), which opened in April 1932. In 1941, the club suspended activities due to World War II. In 1948, the club decided to restart operations by merging with Forest Hill Golf Club and establish a new golf course. A 101-acre (41 ha) dairy farm overlooking Dyer’s Lagoon (now Lake Dyer) was purchased. Professional golf player Tom Southcombe was engaged to plan the golf course. Although play had already commenced on the nine-hole course, it was not officially opened until Sunday 15 April 1951.

The construction of Bill Gunn Dam was completed in 1987. It was named after Bill Gunn, the local member in the Queensland Legislative Assembly and also a former member of the Laidley Shire Council.

== Demographics ==
In the 2016 census, Laidley Heights had a population of 1,263 people.

In the 2021 census, Laidley Heights had a population of 1,429 people.

== Education ==
There are no schools in Laidley Heights. The nearest government primary schools are Blenheim State School in neighbouring Blenheim to the south-west, Forest Hill State School in neighbouring Forest Hill to the north-west, and Laidley District State School in neighbouring Laidley to the east. The nearest government secondary school is Laidley State High School in Laidley.

== Amenities ==
Lake Dyer Recreation Reserve is a park to the east of the lake (27.6323°S 152.3785°E). There are facilities for camping, boating, fishing, swimming, and picnics. There is a boat ramp on Whites Road into Lake Dyer (27.6319°S 152.3773°E). It is managed by the Lockyer Valley Regional Council.

Laidley Golf Club is to the north of Lake Dyer (27.6241°S 152.3757°E). It has a 12-hole golf course with clubhouse facilities.
