= Blenheim State School =

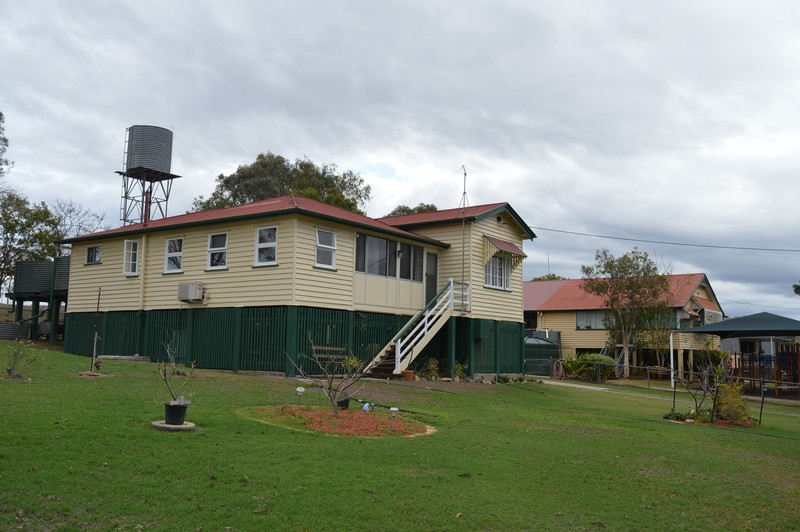
- Blenheim State School, Teachers Residence and Block A, from northeast

- Location within Queensland
- 27.6505°S 152.3313°E
- Location: 81 Blenheim Road, Blenheim, Lockyer Valley Region, Queensland, Australia

History
- Design period: 1900–1914 (Early 20th century)
- Built: 1900, 1935, 1944

Site notes
- Architect: Queensland Department of Public Works

Queensland Heritage Register
- Official name: Blenheim State School
- Type: state heritage
- Designated: 28 February 2020
- Reference no.: 650244
- Type: Education, Research, Scientific Facility: School – state (primary)
- Theme: Educating Queenslanders: Providing primary schooling

Blenheim State School is a heritage-listed state school at 81 Blenheim Road, Blenheim, Lockyer Valley Region, Queensland, Australia. It was designed by Queensland Department of Public Works and built in 1900. It was added to the Queensland Heritage Register on 28 February 2020.

== History ==
Blenheim State School was established in 1879 on a two-acre (0.8ha) site in the rural locality of Blenheim in the Lockyer Valley, approximately 72 km southwest of Brisbane. The school is important in demonstrating the evolution of state education and its associated architecture in Queensland. It retains its playshed (1900), two small timber school buildings (Block A, 1935; Block B, 1944, on site 1977) and its teachers residence (1935), set in spacious grounds with play areas and mature trees. The school has a strong and ongoing association with the Blenheim community.

Blenheim is situated within the traditional lands of the Yuggera Ugarapul people. Blenheim is located in the Lockyer Valley, which comprises the land surrounding all the creeks that flow into Lockyer Creek before it joins the Brisbane River north of the town of Lowood, and is a fertile agricultural district. Closer settlement for agricultural purposes commenced in this area after the sale of land resumed under the Land Act 1868 from the pastoral run Franklinvale (later Franklyn Vale), which had been established in the 1840s. Initially called Sandy Creek, Blenheim developed in the 1870s as a small, farming community about seven kilometres southwest of the town of Laidley. Farming commenced with growing maize, lucerne and potatoes, and progressed into dairying, as well as cropping, by the turn of the 20th century.

With closer settlement at Blenheim, came the need for a school to serve the community. A school committee was formed in 1875 and funds were raised for the establishment of a school. In June 1878, tenders were invited to erect a primary school at Blenheim. Two acres (0.8ha) of land for the school site, located in a curve at the junction of Blenheim Road and Mount Berryman Road, was donated to the Department of Public Instruction by Martin Carmody, owner of Portion 120, who also conducted the mail receiving office for Blenheim. By November 1878, the school building was rapidly approaching completion and the school committee was collecting money towards erection of a teachers residence.

The establishment of schools was considered an essential step in the development of new communities and integral to their success. Locals often donated land and labour for a school's construction and the school community contributed to maintenance and development. Schools became a community focus, a symbol of progress, and a source of pride, with enduring connections formed with past pupils, parents, and teachers. They provided a venue for a wide range of community events in schools across Queensland.

To help ensure consistency and economy, the Queensland Government developed standard plans for its school buildings. From the 1860s until the 1960s, Queensland school buildings were predominantly timber-framed, an easy and cost-effective approach that also enabled the government to provide facilities in remote areas. Standard designs were continually refined in response to changing needs and educational philosophy and Queensland school buildings were particularly innovative in climate control, lighting, and ventilation. Standardisation produced distinctly similar schools across Queensland with complexes of typical components.

Blenheim State School opened on 7 April 1879 with 44 children enrolled. During its first year, enrolments rose to 73 pupils with an average attendance of 40 to 50 pupils. The school building immediately became a popular venue for community meetings. A teachers residence was erected on the site and in 1883 an additional half acre (0.2ha) was added to the south of the school grounds.

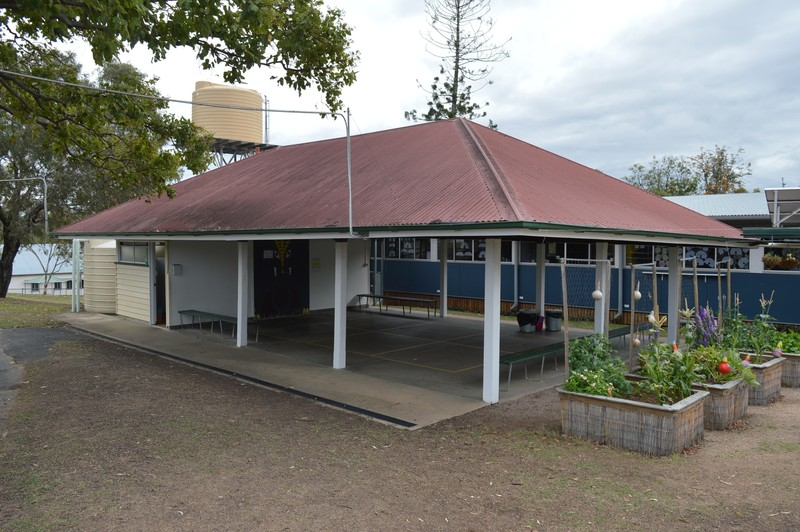
Playshed, from southeast

The Queensland education system recognised the importance of play in the school curriculum and, as school sites were typically cleared of all vegetation, the provision of all-weather outdoor space was necessary. Playsheds were designed as free-standing shelters, with fixed timber seating between posts and earth or decomposed granite floors that provided covered play space and doubled as teaching space when required. These structures were timber-framed and generally open sided, although some were partially enclosed with timber boards or corrugated galvanised iron sheets. The hipped (or less frequently, gabled) roofs were clad with timber shingles or corrugated iron. Playsheds were a typical addition to state schools across Queensland between c. 1880s and the 1950s, although less frequently constructed after c. 1909, with the introduction of highset school buildings with understorey play areas. Built to standard designs, playsheds ranged in size relative to student numbers.

In 1900, the Public Works Department approved the construction of a timber playshed to cater for Blenheim State School's students. The 30 ft x 20 ft (9.14 x 6.1m) playshed had a hipped roof supported on ten stop-chamfered and braced (corners) timber posts. Perimeter timber seats were fixed to the timber posts and had centred openings on the north and south sides, and the gravel floor had a kerbed surround. The playshed was built by Charles Cross at a cost of £76, of which £15.4 was raised by the community.

In 1934, the Department of Public Instruction approved the replacement of Blenheim State School's 55-year-old teaching building, teachers residence and earth closets, which were in poor condition and of outdated designs. A new teaching building and teachers residence were constructed between November 1934 and February 1935 by contractors Arthur Thomas Taylor and Stanley Edwin Taylor, of Sherwood, Brisbane, for £408.17s and £548.7s respectively.

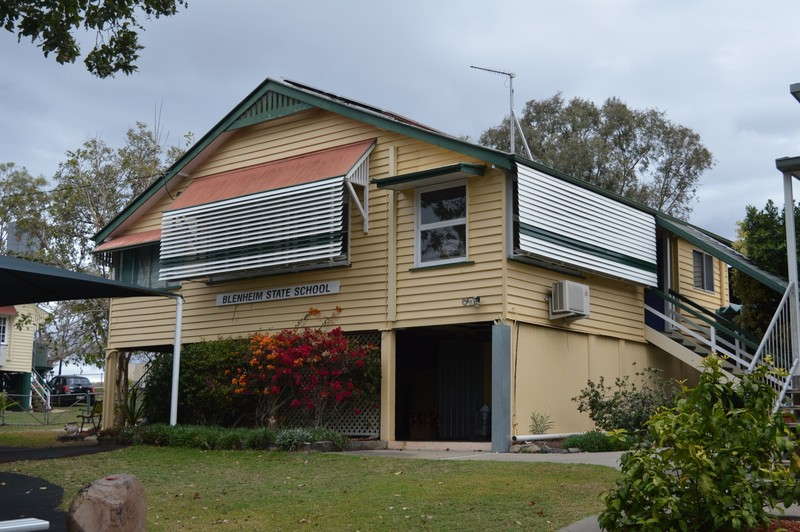
Block A, from northwest

Blenheim State School's new teaching building (Block A in 2019), was a standard design "Small Timber School Building". This type of building was constructed in Queensland between 1930 and 1946 and was a continuation of earlier types of small, country teaching buildings. The classroom width was generally 18 ft (5.5m), and the building was highset, with two verandahs. The type was not designed for expansion, being built for a set number of students - either 24, 40, 60 or 80. In this way they varied from Sectional School Buildings (1920–1950), which had blank end walls to enable future extensions, along with verandahs to the northern side, and large banks of windows to the southern side. The new building, for 60 pupils, was completed in January 1935.

Plans and specifications from 1934 show that the single classroom building was a timber-framed and weatherboard-clad structure, highset on tall timber stumps, with a gabled roof and verandahs on the east and west sides. The classroom was 18 ft x 30 ft (5.5 x 9.1m). Timber stairs provided access to the 8 ft (2.4m) wide verandahs, which had semi-enclosed corner hat rooms at the southern ends. Banks of timber-framed casement windows with fanlights and skillion window hoods were centred on the south and north gable end walls; the northern windows were to have "acid obscured" glass. Doors from the verandah to the classroom were positioned slightly north of the centre, to accommodate two classes in the one room: a smaller, east-facing class to the north; and a larger, west-facing class to the south. This allowed for natural light to enter from the student's left, espoused as an optimum arrangement by educators at the time. The ceiling was coved with an exposed tie rod and an off-centre latticed ceiling vent between the doors. The understorey provided sheltered play space and was partly enclosed with timber battens (southeast) and corrugated metal sheets (south and west); timber seats ran along the south wall and into the southwest corner.

A function held to celebrate the opening of the new school building on 9 February 1935 was attended by dignitaries including the Under Secretary of the Department of Public Instruction, Bernard J McKenna, who officially opened the building; Sir Littleton Groom, MHR; Edmund B Maher, MLA; and shire council members.

The teachers residencewas constructed on an additional one acre (0.4ha) of land adjacent to the school's eastern boundary, which had been purchased for £15 from John Panzram Jr, in 1930. The building was completed by 14 February 1935. Most Queensland state schools incorporated a teachers residence on the site, particularly in rural areas. In Australia, only Queensland offered free accommodation to teachers, from as early as 1864, with the government policy applying to male teachers only. This was partial recompense for a low wage, an incentive for teacher recruitment in rural areas and provided onsite caretakers. Following World War I, teacher shortages were blamed on the inadequacy and shortage of teachers residences. Consequently, many new teacher residences were constructed across Queensland in the 1930s and again following World War II.

Residences designed by the Department of Public Works' architects, and constructed to the high standard demanded by the government, were typically of a higher-quality in design, materials and construction than most similarly-scaled private residences. The detached teachers residence was located within the school grounds at a distance from the teaching buildings, usually with a separate, fenced yard with gardens and trees. The designs ranged from one to four bedrooms and evolved simultaneously with the teaching buildings to adapt to modern needs and styles.

Plans for the residence at Blenheim show a standard 1930s "Teachers Residence". Built from 1929 to 1949, this type was a highset timber-framed structure, with a hipped roof with projecting gable at the front, and an L-shaped verandah to the northwest corner. The interior comprised a core of three bedrooms and a living room arranged around a central hallway, with a rear wing that included a kitchen with stove alcove, storeroom, pantry and bathroom. French doors opened onto the verandah; and the six-light casement windows on exposed exterior walls had skillion hoods. Timber stairs accessed the front verandah and a landing to the rear, and an understorey laundry was located below the kitchen. Corrugated metal water tanks on timber platforms were located to the rear and side of the residence. When built, the Residence at Blenheim had a layout that mirrored its documented plan, with its L-shaped verandah positioned in the northeast corner.

From 1885 until 1941, the Blenheim State School's teachers residence served as the settlement's receiving office or post office, with the head teacher, or his wife, acting as the postmaster/mistress. Accordingly, in 1935, the post office (postal services and telephone exchange) was moved to the new teachers residence. From 1878 to 1885, the first Receiving Office at Blenheim had been located at Martin Carmody's residence, until the service was upgraded to a post office. The post office was reduced to a receiving office about July 1909, elevated to a post office again about January 1910 until its closure. It eventually closed on 1 May 1970. The facilities offered by receiving offices varied with the size and type of population they served, and ranged from a centre for handling mail and selling stamps up to almost full post office facilities. A receiving office was eligible for elevation to a post office if its revenue during the preceding year was more than £12, was likely to be maintained at that level, and if the office keeper was prepared to take on the extra duties. At Blenheim, telegraph duties commenced from 1915 and telephone exchange duties were undertaken from 1924. Original and early telephone fixtures remain in situ, including a bracket and insulator on a former verandah post and a telephone bell attached in the understorey.

An important component of Queensland state schools was their grounds. The early and continuing commitment to play-based education, particularly in primary school, resulted in the provision of outdoor play space and sporting facilities, such as playing fields and tennis courts. Trees and gardens were planted to shade and beautify schools. In the 1870s, schools inspector William Boyd was critical of tropical schools and amongst his recommendations stressed the importance of adding shade trees to playgrounds. Subsequently, Arbor Day celebrations began in Queensland in 1890. Aesthetically-designed gardens were encouraged by regional inspectors, and educators believed gardening and Arbor Days instilled in young minds the value of hard work and activity, improved classroom discipline, developed aesthetic tastes, and inspired people to stay on the land.

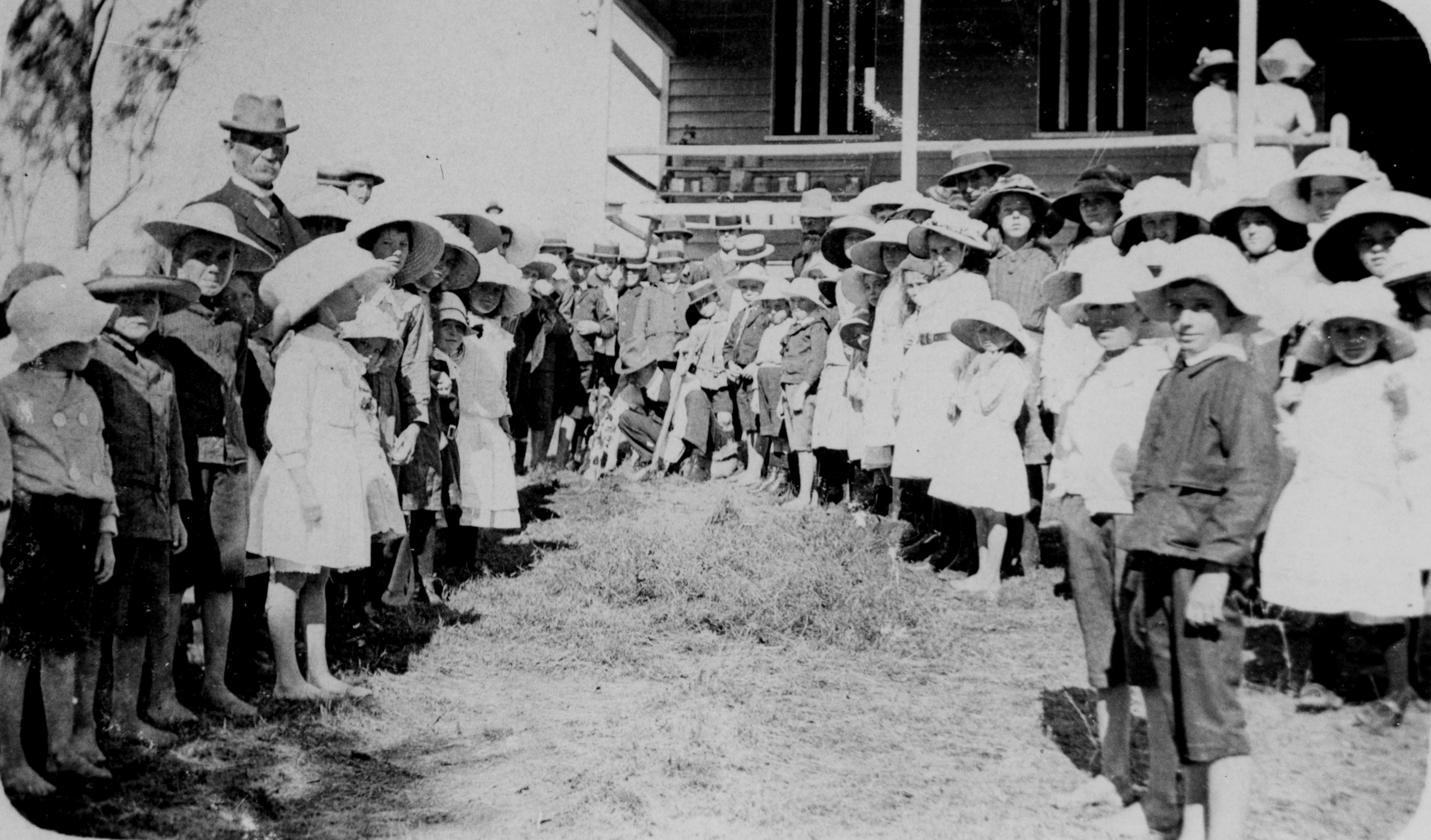
Children assembled for a tree-planting on Arbor Day at Blenheim State School, circa 1913

The grounds at Blenheim State School contain a number of mature trees. Arbor day plantings, undertaken at the school from at least 1892, have included Cyprus pines (Callitris sp.), camphor laurels (Cinnamonum camphora), jacaranda (Jacaranda mimosifolia), cedar trees (genus not identified), and crow's ash (Flindersia australis). At the time of Blenheim State School's centenary in 1979, it was estimated that more than 40 trees and 20 shrubs remained in the school grounds from Arbor Day plantings. Many of those trees appear to have been removed or died in the intervening years to 2019. On the western school boundary, a fig tree (Ficus sp.) and a hoop pine (Araucaria cunninghamii), which predate a 1933 aerial, remain on site.

In 1980, 0.64ha of land, located to the south of the teachers residence, was resumed for use by the school as a playing field. This increased the school grounds to its current extent.

Over time, a number of changes have been made to Block A. In April 1943, the DPW supplied cement and subsidised the cost of gravel and sand for concreting under the school. In 1956, a storeroom was created underneath and shelving was added to the room in 1962. In 1958, a library was provided by enclosing the southern side of the west verandah, with awning windows and a new wall. By 1977 the library was used as a store, the northern side of the west verandah had been enclosed for use as a workroom, and the stairs had been moved to the south. Plans from that time also indicated the proposed enclosure of the east (front) verandah with glass louvres and weatherboards, new doors at the top of the stairs, and a large opening to be formed in the verandah wall. Education Department correspondence indicates that the proposed works did not proceed in 1977, with a new demountable the favoured option for the expanding school. However, glass louvres are evident at the northern end of the east verandah by 1979. The enclosed west verandah was used for administration from 1999, and the interior reconfigured into office spaces in recent years. In 2015, an open-sided gable-roofed extension was added to the southern end of Block A, with doorways formed in the southern bank of windows and the former western hat room.

Some changes have been made to the playshed. In 1950, its gutter was repaired and some sections replaced, while repairs were also made to the posts. A toilet block addition was built on the western end of the playshed in 1978 to upgrade toilet facilities on site. All existing wall sheeting was removed from the structure and re-used where possible. Weatherboard cladding was used on the exterior walls. The timber posts were cut off 100mm above ground and fixed with steel anchor straps set in concrete footings. Roofing to match the existing was used and gutters replaced.

The teachers residence has undergone some alterations, but remains very intact. The front verandah was enclosed in 1960. General repairs to steps and the addition of flat sheeting to the bathroom took place in 1962. All stumps have been replaced in concrete. Changes to the rear wing include conversion of the storeroom to a toilet in 1978, and later reconfiguration to incorporate the pantry into a remodelled bathroom. Rear windows have also been replaced with glass louvres and aluminium-framed sliders.

To accommodate increased enrolments at Blenheim State School, a second small timber school building was transferred to the school in March 1977, from the recently closed Woodlands State School, also in the Lockyer Valley. This building, constructed in 1944 and designed for 40 pupils, had been transferred to Woodlands State School from Ropeley East State School in 1955. Ropeley East opened in 1915 and closed in 1955. Woodlands State School opened in 1897 and closed in 1975. When built, the timber-framed, weatherboard-clad and gable-roofed structure was highset on timber stumps. Plans show it contained a single 18 ft x 21 ft (5.5m x 6.4m) classroom, flanked by 8 ft (2.4m) wide verandahs on the east and west sides that had centred stairs and enclosed hat rooms at the southern ends. Access from the east verandah was via a centred door, while the access from the west verandah was via a door in the hat room - to accommodate wall-mounted hyloplates for the west-facing class. The coved ceiling had an exposed tie rod and centred latticed vent. Banks of timber-framed casement windows with fanlights and skillion window hoods were centred on the gable end walls; the northern bank of windows was originally half the width of the southern, but had been widened by 1964. After its removal to Blenheim State School, where it was sited southwest of the existing building, the small timber school building (Block B in 2019) was given replacement stairs, concrete stumps and understorey floor; a replacement water tank; and both the interior and exterior were painted. By 1999, the verandahs were enclosed for use as storage and staff areas, and a large opening was formed in the west verandah wall.

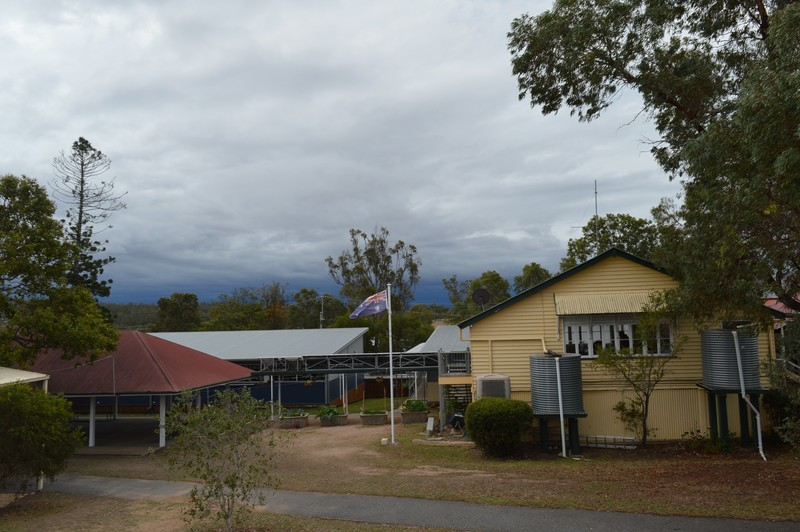
Playshed and Block B, from south

Throughout its history, Blenheim State School has been a focus for its community. The school provided a popular venue for meetings and events. In return, the community supported the school with fundraising through dances and entertainments, and assisted with working bees. Blenheim State School commemorated its 50th anniversary jubilee on 1 May 1929 with celebrations attended by over 400 adults, including 22 of the school's first pupils, as well as Sir Littleton Groom, MHR, and Lady Groom. Arbor Day plantings in 1954 commemorated the school's 75th anniversary and the visit by Queen Elizabeth II to Queensland. The school's centenary in 1979 was marked by the publication of a souvenir history booklet, which included a history of the neighbouring Mount Berryman State School, which had closed on 24 May 1977.

In 2019, Blenheim State School continues to operate from its original site and has an enrolment of 65 pupils. It retains its two small timber school buildings (1935 and 1944), a teachers residence (1935), and a playshed (1900), set in spacious grounds with play areas and mature trees. The school remains important to the Blenheim locality as a key focus for the community.

== Description ==
Blenheim State School occupies a 2.055ha site in Blenheim, a rural township in the Lockyer Valley, approximately 40 km west of Ipswich. The school is located on the corner of Blenheim Road and Mount Berryman Road, and is bounded by rural properties to the south and east. The school buildings, including the adjacent teachers residence in a yard to the east, are located at the northern end of the site and front Blenheim Road. Playing fields occupy the elevated grounds to the south. A variety of trees are scattered across the site, with denser clusters of plantings along the roadside boundaries.

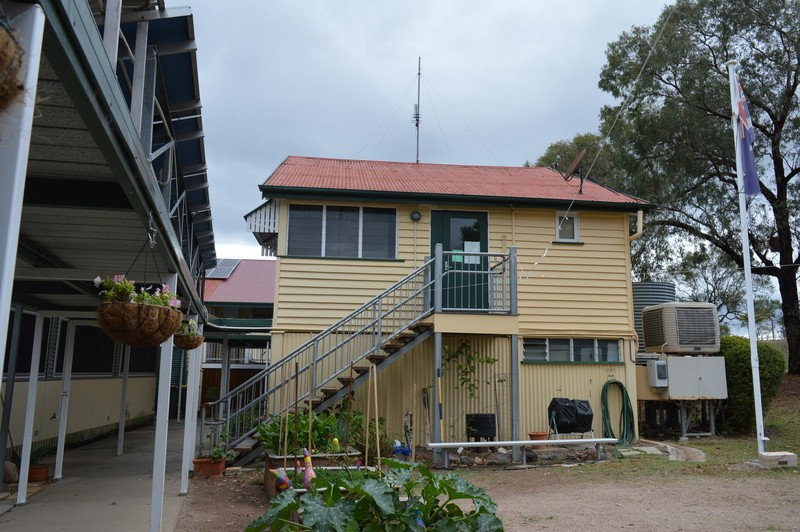
Block A, from northwest

=== Blocks A (1935) and B (1944): Small timber school buildings ===
Blocks A and B are two size variations of a standard teaching building design. Block A is larger, accommodating a single 18 ft x 30 ft (5.5 x 9.1m) classroom, while the Block B classroom (now a staff room) is 18 ft x 21 ft (5.5m x 6.4m).

Both are highset, timber-framed and clad buildings with gable roofs that are continuous over the front (east) and rear (west) verandahs. The verandahs (now enclosed) retain evidence of former hat room enclosures at their southern ends. Access to the verandahs is via stairs, which have been replaced (Block A, east stair in original location, west stair relocated to the south; Block B, stairs retain centred access but have been realigned).

The classrooms have high coved ceilings with ceiling vents. Large banks of windows in the gable ends provide abundant natural light and ventilation. Doorways between the classrooms and former verandahs align with the original stair locations, ceiling vents and exposed metal tie rods, demonstrating axial planning (Block A, north of centre; Block B, centred). Some of the verandah walls have been partially demolished (Block A, east; Block B, west; bulkheads retained) to extend the classrooms.

Used as open play space, the understoreys retain perimeter enclosures to the west and south that are clad in corrugated metal.

=== Playshed (1900) ===
The playshed is an open-sided, timber-framed, former 10-post shelter with a hip roof. The posts have diagonal bracing members to the roof framing, which is exposed internally. One post on the southern side has three notches, possible evidence of an early former enclosure (now removed). Three posts have been replaced by an extension at the western end that accommodates a toilet block, which is not of state-level cultural heritage significance.

=== Teachers residence (1935) ===
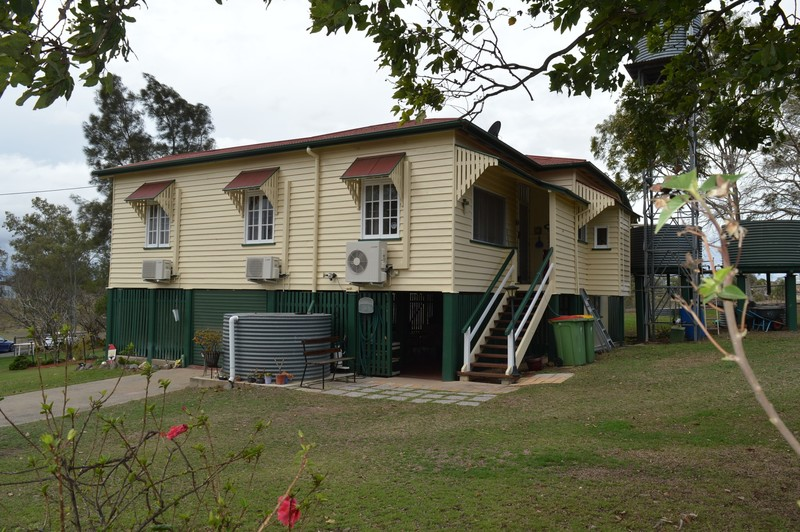
Teachers Residence, from southwest

The teachers residence is a highset, timber-framed and weatherboard-clad building set within an open house yard. The building faces north and has a hip roof, continuous over an L-shaped verandah (now enclosed) to the northeast corner; a front-facing gable roof projects from the northwest corner. Timber stairs provide access to the front verandah and an enclosed landing to the rear.

The interior layout comprises three front bedrooms accessed via a central hallway, with a living room, kitchen, former store (now toilet, added 1978) and bathroom (layout reconfigured to extend bathroom into former pantry) to the rear. The kitchen retains its projecting stove recess.

The understorey is enclosed with timber batten perimeter screens. An enclosed laundry in the southeast corner has flat-sheeted walls and a boarded door. Corrugated-metal water tanks on timber platforms, set on concrete stumps, are located to the south of the residence.

=== Landscape features and views ===
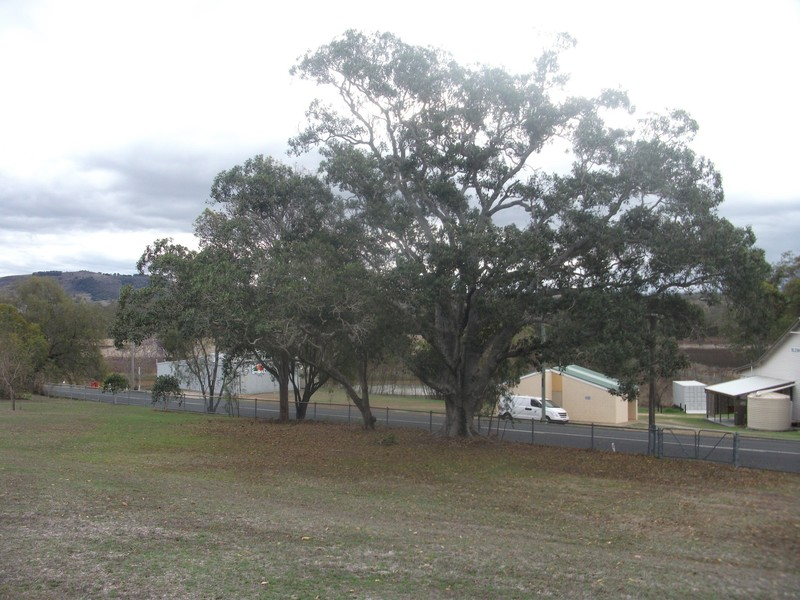
Fig on Mount Berryman Road boundary, from northeast

Block A and the teachers residence (both 1935) stand in their original locations, in alignment with each other and set back an equal distance from Blenheim Road. Open yard space between Block A, the residence and Blenheim Road facilitates views of and between them. Surrounding open space is also important to facilitate abundant natural light and ventilation to the interior of Block A and Block B.

The playshed stands to the west of Block A and retains adjacent open space that connects it with the playing fields to the southeast. Former views between Block A and the playshed have been obscured by relocated Block B.

The school grounds retain a variety of shade trees, including two mature trees along the boundary.

== Heritage listing ==
Blenheim State School was listed on the Queensland Heritage Register on 28 February 2020 having satisfied the following criteria.

The place is important in demonstrating the evolution or pattern of Queensland's history.

Blenheim State School (established in 1879) is important in demonstrating the evolution of state education and its associated architecture in Queensland. The place retains good representative examples of standard government designs that were architectural responses to prevailing government education philosophies, set in large grounds with provision of play areas and mature trees.

The two Small Timber School buildings (Block A, 1935; Block B, 1944, on site 1977) demonstrate the evolution of timber school buildings in providing adequate lighting and ventilation, and the provision of small teaching buildings in regional Queensland.

The teachers residence (1935) is important in demonstrating the Queensland Government's policy of providing residences at country schools as a means of attracting teachers to remote areas.

The playshed (1900) and generous grounds with provision of shade trees, demonstrate the Queensland education system's recognition of the importance of play and aesthetics in the education of children.

The place is important in demonstrating the principal characteristics of a particular class of cultural places.

Blenheim State School is important in demonstrating the principal characteristics of a Queensland state school. These include buildings constructed to standard government designs, and a generous, landscaped site with mature trees and play areas. The school is a good example of a small country school.

Block A and Block B are important in demonstrating the principal characteristics of small timber school buildings designed by the Department of Public Works (DPW), and are good examples in two size variations. The buildings are intact, retaining their: highset, gable roof form; understorey play space; front and rear verandahs with hat rooms; timber-framed and -clad construction; single classroom with lofty coved ceiling; and large banks of operable windows to the gable end walls, providing abundant natural light and ventilation to the interior.

The teachers residence is a good, intact example of a DPW standard "Type 3" residence and is important in demonstrating the principal characteristics of the type. These include its: highset, hip roof with front gable form; timber-framed and -clad construction with single-skin verandah wall; L-shaped verandah; layout of living spaces and bedrooms; early timber joinery and linings; and setting in a house yard.

The intact playshed demonstrates the principal characteristics of its type. These include its: hip roof form with exposed timber framing supported on braced, timber posts; and adjacent open space.

The place has a strong or special association with a particular community or cultural group for social, cultural or spiritual reasons.

Blenheim State School has a strong and ongoing association with former pupils, parents, staff members, and its surrounding community, through sustained use since its establishment in the developing agricultural locality of Blenheim in 1879. Founded due to the efforts of the community, Blenheim State School is important for its contribution to the educational development of the Blenheim district as generations of children have been taught at the school, and as a focus and venue for the community for more than 140 years. The strength of association is demonstrated through repeated social interactions, volunteer actions, donations, and an active Parents and Citizens Association.
