= Forest Hill State School =

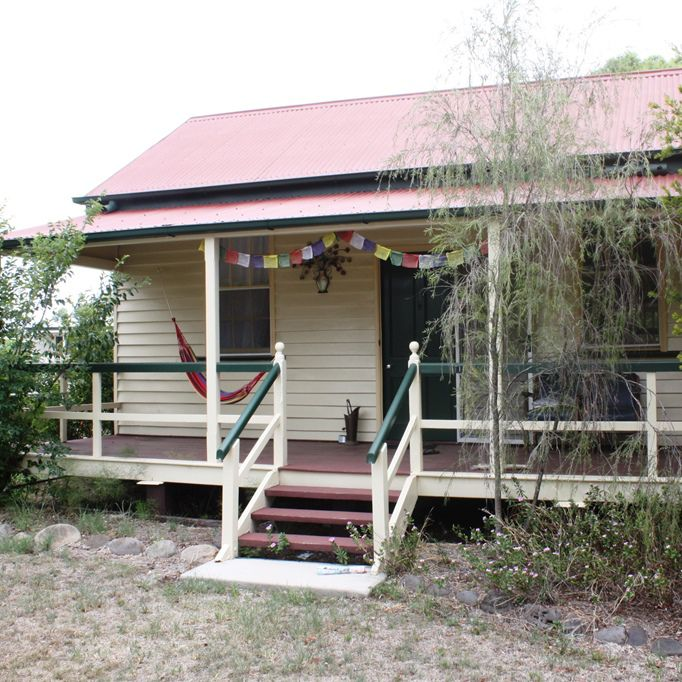
- Forest Hill State School, residence viewed from the north, 2014

- Location within Queensland
- 27.5910°S 152.3548°E
- Location: 15 Church Street, Forest Hill, Lockyer Valley Region, Queensland, Australia

History
- Built: 1892–1906 (residence)

Site notes
- Architect: Queensland Department of Public Works

Queensland Heritage Register
- Official name: Forest Hill State School
- Type: state heritage
- Designated: 1 May 2015
- Reference no.: 602851
- Type: Education, research, scientific facility: School-state
- Theme: Educating Queenslanders: Providing primary schooling
- Builders: Luder

Forest Hill State School is a state school with a heritage-listed teacher's residence at 15 Church Street, Forest Hill, Lockyer Valley Region, Queensland, Australia. It was designed by Queensland Department of Public Works and built from 1892 to 1906 by Luder. It was added to the Queensland Heritage Register on 1 May 2015.

== History ==
Forest Hill Provisional School opened in January 1893 in a small timber teaching building which was built to a standard government design. The provisional school building was constructed during 1892 on a 1 acre (0.40 ha) site in Church Street, in the agricultural settlement of Forest Hill. When a new state school building was constructed in 1898, the provisional school building was converted, with additions, into a teacher's residence, with further additions constructed c. 1906. Although the state school teaching buildings (1898 and c. 1913) have since been replaced, the former provisional school building is still used as a teacher's residence, and two mature bunya trees (Araucaria bidwillii) mark the former entrance to the 1898 state school building.

The small town of Forest Hill was once one of the busiest agricultural loading points in Queensland. Traditionally the land of the Yuggera people, from the early 1840s the area around Forest Hill was part of the "Rosewood" pastoral station. Rosewood station was briefly held by David McConnel, but was leased to Thomas Lodge Murray-Prior by 1844. Some Rosewood land was later resumed by the Queensland Government as part of the West Moreton Agricultural Reserve, to enable closer settlement, and was offered for sale in the 1860s. In 1868 a number of farm portions in the area around Forest Hill, including Portion 47, were purchased from Thomas Lodge Murray-Prior by Jondaryan Estates. The land was subdivided into farm and town blocks in 1886 as the Laidley Plains Estate, and Portion 47 was subdivided into town blocks. Jondaryan Estates was formed c. 1864 by the partnership of William Kent and Edward Wienholt (from 1858), who had purchased multiple stations over time, including Rosewood, Tarampa and Jondaryan.

The main reason for the subdivision of Portion 47 was the presence of the Southern and Western Railway along its northern boundary. The railway had been built westwards from Ipswich to serve the pastoralists of the Darling Downs. The section between Grandchester and Gatton was formally opened on 31 May 1866. The first agriculturalist in the Forest Hill area, Major AJ Boyd, purchased land 6 kilometres (3.7 mi) south of the railway in 1880, and requested a siding on the line to the west of Laidley. Boyd obtained his rank in the Queensland Permanent Artillery, and has a park named after him in Nundah, Brisbane. He was editor of the Queensland Agricultural Journal from 1897 to 1921, and served in the Queensland Public Service for c.40 years. Initially known as Boyd's siding, this was renamed after his property "Forest Hill" by 1881, and in 1886 the siding was moved about a kilometre west, to the site of the current Forest Hill railway station. Jondaryan Estates put more freehold land up for sale in 1889, and by 1890 there was a produce business and blacksmith in Forest Hill. A hotel, The Pioneer Hotel on William Street, also operated briefly at Forest Hill between 1889 and 1891.

The growing town soon required a school. The provision of state-administered education was important to the colonial governments of Australia. The establishment of schools was considered an essential step in the development of early communities and integral to their success. Locals often donated land and labour for a school's construction and the school community contributed to maintenance and development. Schools became a community focus, a symbol of progress, and a source of pride, with enduring connections formed with past pupils, parents, and teachers.

From 1869, in rural areas where there would be less than 30 pupils attending, provisional schools could be established. A provisional school could be opened with as few as 15 (later 12) pupils. Local committees provided a building and found a teacher, and the Board of General Education (established 1860) paid the teacher's salary relative to the number of pupils. Provisional schools were regarded as interim measures until state schools were built and were often hastily erected by voluntary labour using basic materials. By 1908, 640 provisional schools were operating compared with 461 state schools.

In August 1890, the Forest Hill community investigated the possibility of obtaining a provisional school, and a committee was formed in September that year. Fundraising for the construction of a school was underway by this time. Jondaryan Estates set aside 1 acre (0.40 ha) of land on Portion 47, and in September 1890 this was given to the school committee. Jondaryan Estates initially set aside subdivision 75, but was persuaded to donate subdivisions 65 and 66 instead. Subdivision 67 had already been set aside for the Church of England. An application for a provisional school was made after WR Burton became secretary of the school committee in August 1891, and the school was built for £98 by Mr Luder, with a government grant of £49.

The Forest Hill Provisional School was based on a standard government plan. To help ensure consistency and economy, the Queensland Government developed standard plans for its school buildings. From the 1860s until the 1960s, Queensland school buildings were predominantly timber-framed, an easy and cost-effective approach that also enabled the government to provide facilities in remote areas. Standardisation produced distinctly similar schools across Queensland with complexes of typical components.

However, early provisional school buildings were not built to standard plans and many were of poor quality. Under regulations introduced in 1892 to address this situation, if a provisional school was built according to government specifications, the government would provide up to half the cost of the building and its furniture. The recommended government plan for provisional schools was for a small low-set timber framed and clad building with a gable roof (type B/T6). It accommodated one large classroom 21 by 14 feet (6.4 m × 4.3 m) with a front verandah, although a rear verandah was sometimes provided. The building was single-skin construction, lined externally with chamferboards. The building had few windows and ventilation was provided by a high-level louvred vent in the gable end wall. These were often a huge improvement over the previous provisional school buildings and were constructed until c. 1910.

In June 1893, it was reported that:

"The year... saw the beginning of a new practice in regard to provisional schools, the Department now... contributing, on certain conditions, towards the cost of their erection... Examples of this are afforded by the new schools at... and Forest Hill, which have been erected in accordance with departmental plans and specifications".

The Forest Hill provisional school building consisted of a classroom 24.6 by 14 feet (7.5 m × 4.3 m), with a 7-foot (2.1 m) front verandah, and an 8-foot (2.4 m) back verandah. The building was inspected in December 1892, and Provisional School No.697 opened on 23 January 1893.

Forest Hill Provisional School became a state school in 1899, due to local population growth. The Queensland government's 1896 repurchase of 6,000 acres (2,400 ha) of the Rosewood Estate, comprising fertile black soil land on the northern side of the Forest Hill railway station accelerated development of the town – and that same year the Queensland Agricultural College was constructed 4 kilometres (2.5 mi) northwest of Forest Hill. Between 1898 and 1906 three hotels were built in Forest Hill – the Station Hotel (1898) now the Forest Hill Hotel; the Crown Hotel (1902) burnt down in 1909; and the Lockyer Hotel (1906). The town's first bank opened in 1901 and the first police station in 1902.

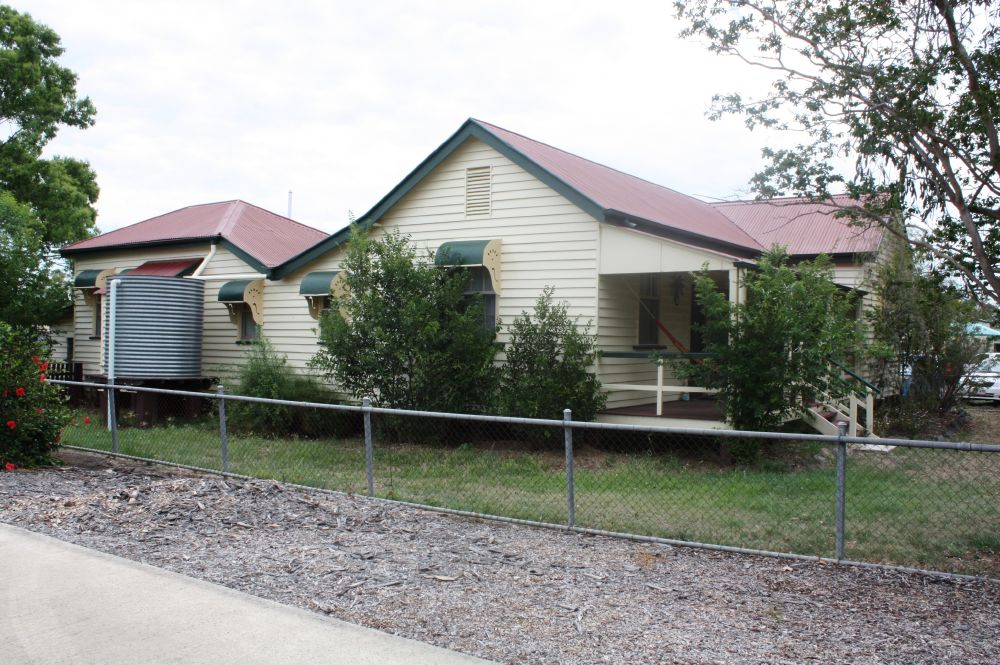
Side view showing the 1898 kitchen extension at the rear, 2014

While a provisional school only required 1 acre (0.40 ha), state schools required a minimum of 2 acres (0.81 ha). The Department of Public Instruction paid 4/5ths of the £22 required to purchase an additional 3 acres (1.2 ha) to the northwest and southwest of the provisional school grounds, from Jondaryan Estates, in early 1898, making a total of 4 acres (1.6 ha). Tenders were called in mid-1898 for a new state school, conversion of the existing provisional school into a teacher's residence, and fencing. In October 1898, the establishment of the state school was authorised by the Governor, and the tender of R Hodges for a new state school at Forest Hill (£539/1/6) was accepted.

Most Queensland state schools incorporated a teacher's residence on the site, particularly in rural areas. In Australia, only Queensland offered free accommodation to teachers, the government policy applying to male teachers (only) from as early as 1864. This was partial recompense for a low wage, an incentive for teacher recruitment in rural areas and provided onsite caretakers. Refinement of the standard residence design occurred over time, with each modification responding to teacher complaints and Teachers' Union agitation.

From the outset, teachers' residences were built to a standard regulated by the Board of General Education. Initially, residences were most often attached as annexes to the classroom building, but from the 1880s were built as detached residences. These residences were similar to the vernacular Queensland house but typically of a higher-quality in design, materials and construction than most similarly scaled private residences. The detached teacher's residence was located within the school grounds at a distance from the teaching buildings, usually with a separate, fenced yard with gardens and trees, and this practice was followed at Forest Hill.

The new Forest Hill State School's teacher's residence was not a standard design, as it consisted of modifications to the existing school teaching building. As part of the conversion, a partition was added to the main classroom space of the former provisional school; two bedrooms were created on the rear verandah, and a storeroom, kitchen and servant's bedroom wing was added to the rear. The new state school was declared on 1 May 1899, after completion of the new teaching building. There were 70 children on the roll by August 1899.

Two bunya trees were planted either side of the front gate to the state school building by 1910, both of which survive in 2015. Trees and gardens were planted as part of beautification of schools, and Arbor Day celebrations began in Queensland in 1890. Educators believed gardening and Arbor Days instilled in young minds the value of hard work and activity, improved classroom discipline, developed aesthetic tastes, and inspired people to stay on the land.

Forest Hill continued to prosper after the state school opened. A further 18,000 acres (7,300 ha) in the Lockyer Valley were subdivided and sold as farms in 1903, town blocks were sold north of the railway line in 1904, and Forest Hill emerged as a thriving township. By 1908, when the Post Office moved from the railway station to its own building in town, the Forest Hill railway station was despatching more produce than either of the older settlements of Gatton and Laidley, and Forest Hill laid claim to being the largest loading centre in Queensland in the early decades of the 20th century.

As the town expanded, so did the teacher's residence. The first head teacher at the state school was James McNally, who had six children. McNally was welcomed to Forest Hill at the annual school picnic on Queen's Birthday (24 May 1899). Due to the residence being too small for his family, additions were approved in June 1906, at a cost of £115 – although Michael O'Keeffe, MLA, had described the residence as "a little humpy, unfit for a family to reside in", and had recommended a new building. The additions consisted of a new sitting room, dining room and bathroom on the northwest side of the residence, with a new verandah at the rear connecting to the verandah of the kitchen wing. Another partition was also added to the former classroom space, creating a central hallway.

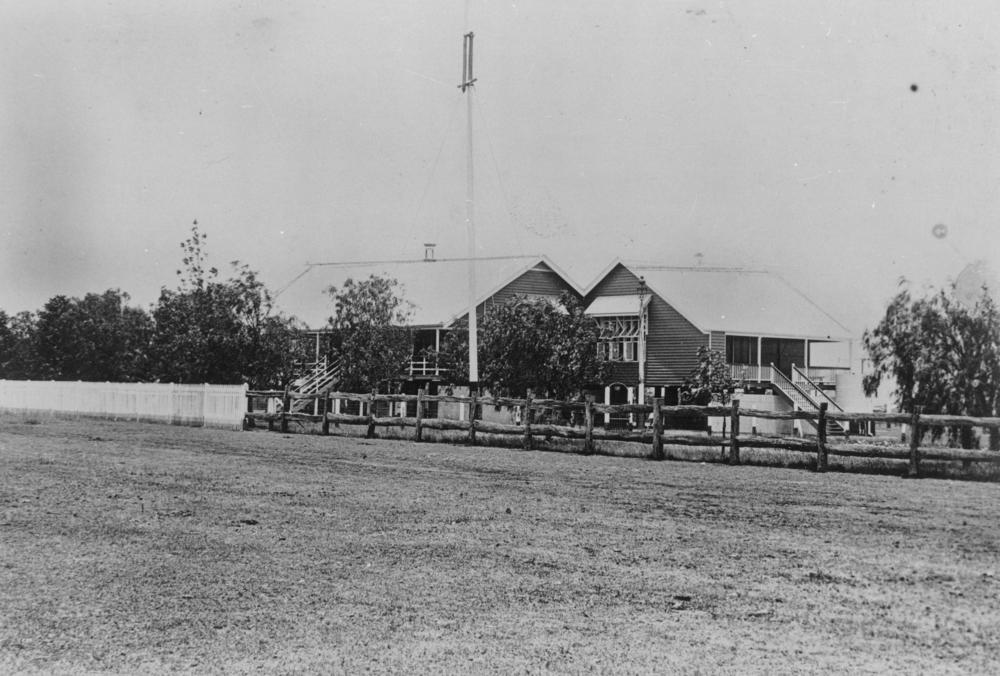
Classroom buildings (not heritage-listed), 1914

The population of the town increased due to the duplication of the railway line west of Laidley from 1911, and in 1914 Forest Hill State School reached its peak enrolment – 166 pupils with 5 teachers. By this time, a new room had been added to the state school building, c.1913. In 1923 approval was given to enclose under the school for vocational classes, and by 1937 a tennis court existed southwest of the residence.

After World War II, the area's main industries were still dairying and agriculture. However, by the 1960s road transport was replacing rail; and Forest Hill's importance as a loading centre for agricultural produce waned, with a number of businesses moving to Gatton.

Despite this decline, the Forest Hill State School received a new school building, which was occupied in March 1965, and officially opened in May 1965. The old state school teaching buildings were sold for removal that year. A classroom was built under the new school in 1969, and a library and a demountable building were later built between the 1965 school and the residence – the demountable occupying the site of the 1898 state school building. In the 1980s, suggestions to remove the bunya trees for safety reasons (falling bunya nuts) were defeated by community attachment to the trees, and a garden was formed beneath them instead. An early education unit opened on the grounds in 1982, and later became a pre-school. Land to the south of the former provisional school was added to the school grounds by 1987. The current grounds cover 4.5 acres (1.8 ha).

The former provisional school continues to be used as a teacher's residence. A small skillion roof toilet has been added – projecting northwest from the southern end of the kitchen's northwest verandah – and a slab-on-ground skillion roofed laundry has been added to the rear of the kitchen. The building has been restumped with concrete stumps; the wall between the kitchen and a servant's room has been removed to form a larger kitchen space; and the wall between the northwest end of the original school building and the former rear verandah bedroom has been removed, forming a larger living room space.

In 2015, Forest Hill's school continues to be important to the town and district, having operated since 1893 and generations of Forest Hill students have been taught there.

== Description ==
The teacher's residence and mature bunya pine trees (Araucaria bidwillii) are situated within the grounds of Forest Hill State School, in the Lockyer Valley region. The school occupies an approximately 1.8-hectare (4.4-acre) site bounded by Church, Kent and Dyer Streets. The school addresses Church Street, with most school buildings located in the northern corner of the site. The teacher's residence is located at the southeastern end of the Church Street frontage, and the bunya pine trees stand along the Church Street fence line, northwest of the residence. No other buildings, structures or trees within the school grounds are of cultural heritage significance.

=== Teacher's Residence ===
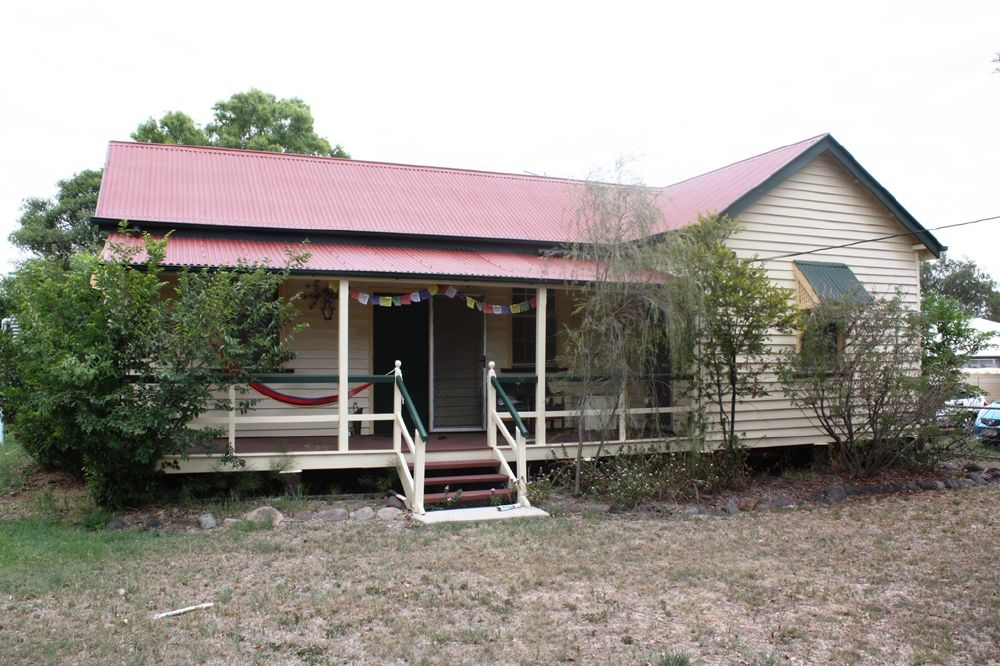
Front view of the residence, 2014

Constructed in three stages, the residence is composed of a former provisional school building (1892) which forms the core; a kitchen wing (1898) at the rear; and a side extension (c.1906) northwest of the core. The building is timber framed, clad in timber weatherboards and stands on low concrete stumps. It has a front verandah and an enclosed, L-shaped verandah at the rear. Reflecting the extensions added over time, the building has a variety of roof forms. The core has a gable roof with stepped verandah roof on the northeast side and a broken-back roof (formerly a verandah roof) on the southwest side. The kitchen wing has a hipped roof, and the side extension has a gable roof with a small hipped section over a room at the southwest corner. A projecting stove alcove and laundry addition, both attached to the kitchen wing, have skillion roofs. All roofs are clad in corrugated metal sheeting and eaves are unlined.

The front verandah, accessed by a set of centrally located stairs, has a two-rail timber balustrade and stop-chamfered verandah posts. Balustrade posts at the top of the stairs are topped with ball finials.

Two types of early windows and window hoods survive (some relocated from their original positions when the side extension was built). The earliest windows are timber-framed, six light sash windows located in the core and side extension walls. Other early windows are timber-framed, two light sashes. Windows hoods are either curved metal with patterned sides or timber skillion window hoods with latticed brackets. The southeast elevation of the core retains a rectangular louvred ventilation panel in the centre of the gable. Similar louvres provide ventilation to the projecting stove alcove.

The plan of the core consists of a central corridor with two bedrooms on the eastern side and a single long room used as a living room on the western side. A doorway has been cut into the southern wall of the southern bedroom, allowing access to an adjacent storeroom. Diagonal timber brackets supporting the roof indicate where the former verandah walls were removed in the southern bedroom and the living room. Verandah posts have been re-used as additional structural support in some locations. The kitchen wing contains a single large room used as kitchen and dining room. The side extension contains two large rooms and a bathroom, which opens off the rear verandah. The rear verandah is enclosed with sliding aluminium windows and the former balustrade is clad in flat sheeting. The raked ceilings throughout the verandah area are lined with flat sheeting and some sections have cover strips. A toilet room added at the southern end of the verandah is not of heritage significance.

Floors throughout the residence are timber, covered in non-significant modern carpet or linoleum. Internal walls are generally single-skin, except in locations where a former exterior wall is now an internal wall. Walls and ceilings have a variety of linings but are predominantly wide beaded boards. In the core, boards are laid horizontally on the walls of the former school room and some partitions. Belt rails with beaded edges appear to be used for earlier partitions and rails with chamfered edges for partitions dating from the c.1906 extension.

Two types of early doors are found throughout the residence: ledged or braced-and-ledged timber doors made from vertical boards; and four panel timber doors, some with rectangular fanlights above. Most of these doors retain original or early hardware, including locks and keyhole covers. The front door retains an early doorbell.

The laundry addition, accessed by a braced and ledged timber door on the southwest side, has a concrete floor, small louvred windows, and single-skin walls. A large concrete laundry sink stands against the northeast wall. A raised water tank near the southwest corner of the residence occupies the location of an earlier water tank.

The residence is set back approximately 10 metres (33 ft) from the front boundary, surrounded by a fenced yard. The scale and style of the residence makes a positive contribution to the Church Street streetscape, which consists mainly of moderately-sized timber houses and churches from the late 19th - mid 20th century on generous blocks of land. The residence is visible for some distance along Church Street, particularly from the east.

=== Bunya trees ===
The two large bunya trees are a landmark feature of the street and surrounding neighbourhood, due to their height and wide canopies (which have a radius of approximately 5.4 metres (18 ft) in 2014). Standing 8 metres (26 ft) apart and set back 1.8 metres (5 ft 11 in) from the front fence, the trees are surrounded by a recent garden bed.

== Heritage listing ==
Forest Hill State School was listed on the Queensland Heritage Register on 1 May 2015 having satisfied the following criteria.

The place is important in demonstrating the evolution or pattern of Queensland's history.

The Forest Hill State School residence, built in 1892 as a provisional school and converted to a residence in 1898, is important in demonstrating the evolution of state education and its associated architecture in Queensland. It is a representative example of a standard government-designed provisional school building that was later extended to become a state school residence.

The original building is a product of the Queensland Government's policy, from 1892, of providing up to 50 percent government funding for provisional schools built to standard government plans. Its later conversion to a residence demonstrates the policies, at the time, of providing residences for married male head teachers in rural areas and of re-using provisional school buildings as state school residences.

The place is important in demonstrating the principal characteristics of a particular class of cultural places.

The place is important in demonstrating the principal characteristics of early Queensland schools, including the use of standard designs, the conversion of earlier school buildings to teacher's residences, and tree planting.

The Forest Hill State School residence is important in demonstrating the principal characteristics of a Queensland provisional school building converted into a teacher's residence. It retains the school's lowset form; narrow width; early windows and doors; front verandah with stepped verandah roof and centrally aligned stairs; and louvred gable ventilation. The 1898 additions, which include a kitchen wing and the enclosure of the rear provisional school verandah to form bedrooms, reflect the requirements of converting the school building for residential use; while the rooms and bathroom added in 1906 demonstrate the need to adapt residences over time to accommodate teachers and their families.

The two bunya pines (Araucaria bidwillii), planted prior to 1910 facing Church Street, are fine examples of the feature trees planted in Queensland school grounds.

The place has a strong or special association with a particular community or cultural group for social, cultural or spiritual reasons.

Schools have always played an important part in Queensland communities. They typically retain significant and enduring connections with former pupils, parents, and teachers; provide a venue for social interaction and volunteer work; and are a source of pride, symbolising local progress and aspirations.

The Forest Hill State School has a strong and ongoing association with the Forest Hill community. The teacher's residence was built as a provisional school in 1892 through the fundraising efforts of the local community. The school is important for its contribution to the educational development of Forest Hill. The bunya trees are a landmark feature.

== See also ==
- List of schools in West Moreton
- History of state education in Queensland
