= Forest Hill Hotel =

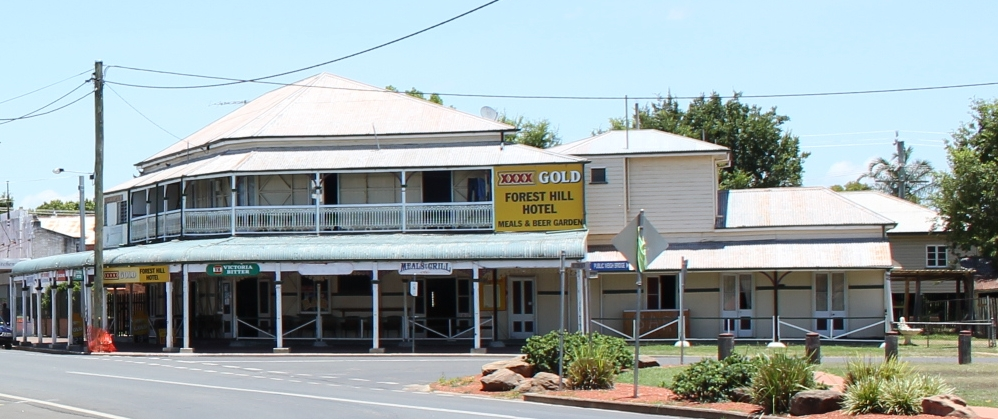
- Forest Hill Hotel, 2012

- Location within Queensland Location within Australia
- 27.5894°S 152.3564°E
- Location: 38 William Street, Forest Hill, Lockyer Valley Region, Queensland, Australia

History
- Design period: 1870s–1890s (late 19th century)
- Built: 1898

Queensland Heritage Register
- Official name: Forest Hill Hotel, Station Hotel
- Type: state heritage (built)
- Designated: 21 October 1992
- Reference no.: 600652
- Significant period: 1890s (fabric); 1898–ongoing (historical use)

Forest Hill Hotel is a heritage-listed hotel at 38 William Street, Forest Hill, Lockyer Valley Region, Queensland, Australia. It was built in 1898. It is also known as Station Hotel. It was added to the Queensland Heritage Register on 21 October 1992.

== History ==
Constructed in 1898, the Forest Hill Hotel is a good example of a two-storeyed, timber, corner hotel typical in rural Queensland towns. It was established at a time of growth and consolidation in Forest Hill following closer agricultural settlement of the immediate area in the 1890s and the development of Forest Hill as a service center and railhead for the surrounding farmlands.

From the 1840s to the 1880s, Forest Hill was part of the 20,000-acre (8,100 ha) Rosewood run, first taken up by David C McConnel in 1840, and later occupied by Kent & Wienholt, who worked the station in conjunction with their Jondaryan run. At that time the Forest Hill land was heavily timbered, with some large gum swamps.

In 1865 the Ipswich to Toowoomba railway was surveyed between Laidley and Gatton, but a siding was not established in the Forest Hill area until about 1881. At that time, the area which became known as Forest Hill was owned by Mr AJ Boyd who on first moving to the area found that the nearest form of conveyance was the railway line serving Laidley. Through intervention with the appropriate authorities, Boyd was able to arrange a siding onto his property "Forest Hill". Originally it was called Boyd's Siding but was subsequently named for the property, Forest Hill. Boyd was the first agriculturalist in the area and cultivated an orchard on his property. In 1886 the Queensland Railway Department provided a continuation of the line beyond Laidley and a new siding was constructed one mile east of the Forest Hill siding, it too was called Forest Hill.

Also at this time, in 1886 and 1889, Kent & Wienholt cut up 3,500 acres (1,400 ha) south of the second Forest Hill siding into farm selections. This was the impetus for the establishment of an agricultural community at Forest Hill, but the township of Forest Hill did not emerge until the late 1890s, following the Queensland Government's 1896 repurchase of 6,000 acres (2,400 ha) of the Rosewood freehold on the northern side of the Forest Hill railway station. This Rosewood Estate, comprising fertile black soil land, was cut into blocks of 70 to 125 acres (28 to 51 ha), and sold at prices from £3 to £5/5/0 per acre, repayable over 20 years. The sale was part of a government initiative to encourage agricultural settlement of the rich West Moreton lands, by opening for selection nearly all the country between Lowood and Gatton. A further 18,000 acres (7,300 ha) in the Lockyer Valley were cut up and sold as farms in 1903, and Forest Hill emerged as a thriving township. By 1908, Forest Hill was despatching more produce than either of the older settlements of Gatton and Laidley, and of this, about 70 percent came from the farms on the repurchased estates. The Forest Hill Hotel was erected during growth period.

By 1909 the township of Forest Hill was a thriving centre, boasting three hotels, a post office, bank and a state school. In that year, the Crown Hotel was burnt down, leaving two hotels remaining (Forest Hill Hotel and Lockyer Hotel). The economic base of the town was the healthy agricultural community which surrounded it. The rich soils, combined with a high water table enabled extraordinary crops to be produced, several properties boasting seven cuts of lucerne in 1902, a drought year. During periods of drought this high water table served to protect the crops of many of the local farmers so that the local production remained at an acceptable level while neighbouring districts suffered.

The land on which the hotel now sits was first purchased as part of three parcels of land by Thomas Lodge Prior in 1867 comprising a total of 238 acres (96 ha). The land was strategically located adjacent to the new railway station. After a series of complex transactions the land was subdivided and in 1888 Henry Chapman purchased Subdivision 1 of portion 47. Ten years later the land was sold to James Campbell who took out mortgages totalling £480 over the ensuing months. In 1900 a lease was registered to the Castlemaine Brewery, confirming that a hotel was, by this time, present on the land. A series of lessors undertook the management of the hotel over the ensuing years. In 1941 James Campbell died and the hotel passed to his widow, Margaret. Margaret, in her turn, passed the land to Charles Joseph Heenan and Kathleen Mary Heenan in 1948 who subsequently sold the place in 1951. Three years later the place was again sold, this time to Edward Walston Toohey and Muriel Mary Toohey who transferred the property to Joseph Conleth Carroll and Jean Carroll in 1955. In 1975 the property again changed hands with Ian William Wiseman and Margaret Betty Wiseman as joint tenants. Two years later the property passed to William Morris Graham, Dorothy Margaret Graham, Arthur Hugh Mears and Dulcie Margaret Mears. In 1980 the Grahams bought out the Mears' share and sold the property to the present owners in 1989. The property description was altered to Lot 1 on RP7905 in 1982.

During the years since the hotel was constructed numerous alterations have occurred in the interior, reflecting changing technologies and the desire of lessors to ensure that the hotel met the requirements of the public. The most recent alteration occurred in 1993, when the lessor undertook renovations to provide access to a side pergola or beer garden.

Prior to around 1940 the Forest Hill Hotel was known as the Station Hotel.

== Description ==
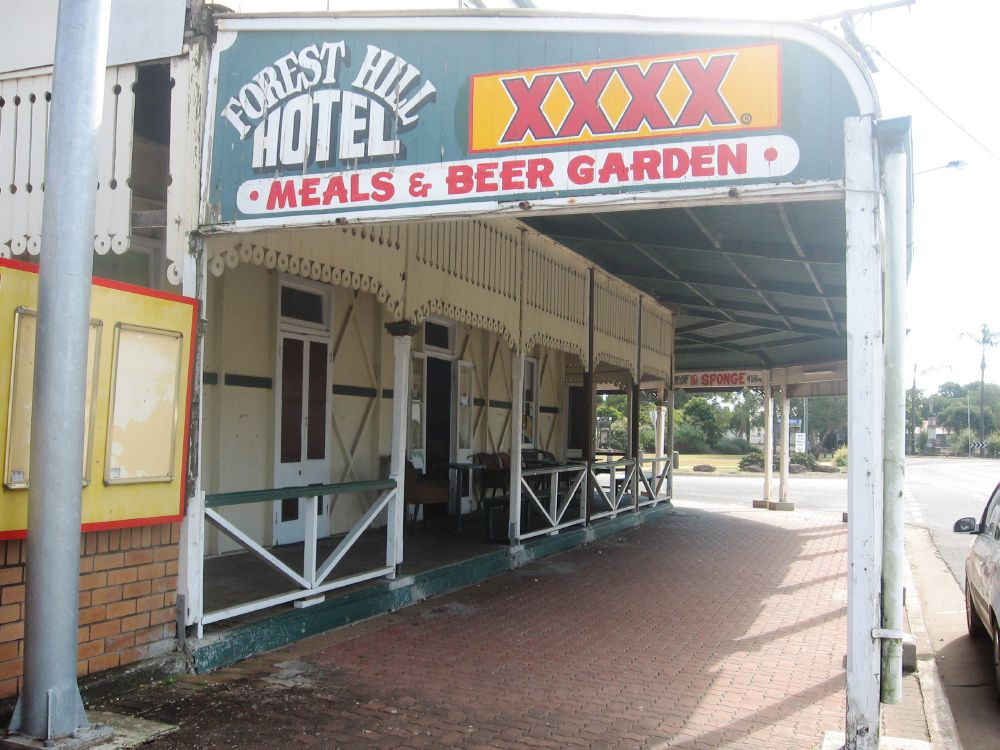
Ground floor verandah, 2011

The Forest Hill Hotel is situated in the main thoroughfare of Forest Hill, built to the corner of William and Victoria Streets. It is a dominant part of the townscape in the small town of Forest Hill standing diagonally opposite the prominent Lockyer Hotel. The two hotels provide a visual focus in the town and form a major proportion of the built infrastructure in the main street.

The Forest Hill Hotel has two storeys with verandas to each storey on the alignment to the principal streets. Constructed from timber and iron the hotel has a number of characteristics of the vernacular Queensland style. The main core of the roof is a simple pyramid with a separate roof over the upper verandah. There is a split-level timber addition on the northern side facing William Street which adjoins the core of the hotel and continues the ground floor verandah.

A wide bull-nosed street awning extends from the base of the upper verandah out to the edge of the footpath along the frontages of William and Victoria Streets and is supported by stop-chamfered timber posts decorated with capitals. It is possible that this awning was added at a later stage as a narrower ground floor verandah sits underneath this awning. The ground floor verandah encompasses the hotel and was sheltered by the original line of the upper-verandah. It is decorated with an arched timber valance with crude circular and slot motifs and features slender stop-chamfered timber posts with simple capitals and simple timber brackets. This verandah sits on a raised concrete slab and is punctuated by double French-doors along the building line. The structure and the diagonal bracing of the walls are exposed externally.

Each end of the upper verandah has been sheeted behind the balustrade otherwise it remains intact. The cast iron balustrades are identified as being the design of John Crase & Co. Foundry who operated out of Warren Street, Fortitude Valley, Brisbane from 1885 until at least 1902.

The interior of the hotel has been the most changed with new bars and a carpeted floor however the walls and ceilings are unchanged and intact. The large internal stairs, which were once accessed by an entrance hall to Victoria Street, have been closed off by temporary means at the ground floor level. The timber staircase displays simple timber balustrades. The stairs access the accommodation on the upper storey.

There are several bedrooms on the upper-level all of which would have originally accessed the verandah via double French-doors. The verandah doors were the only access to the bedrooms having no internal doors. The verandah acted as an external hallway. This is still evident in the layout; however the rear verandah has been enclosed at some time to create extra space. The two bedrooms facing the rear now open onto an internal space which leads to a communal bathroom on the northern side of the building in the split level addition. The three bedrooms opening onto the northern verandah are still used as accommodation.

On the south side of the hotel a timber pergola has been provided to allow outdoor dining and drinking facilities. A side door and window were altered to accommodate two large doors on the southern side of the hotel. The doors are hinged to open upwards, attaching to the awning over the outdoor eating area. The doors are steel-framed and clad in UPVC boarding.

== Heritage listing ==
Forest Hill Hotel was listed on the Queensland Heritage Register on 21 October 1992 having satisfied the following criteria.

The place is important in demonstrating the evolution or pattern of Queensland's history.

The Forest Hill Hotel in Forest Hill is important in demonstrating the evolution of Queensland's history, being evidence of the late 19th century development of Forest Hill as a focal point for the surrounding agricultural district.

The place is important in demonstrating the principal characteristics of a particular class of cultural places.

It is important in demonstrating the principal characteristics of a two-storeyed, single-skin timber hotel of the 1890s in rural Queensland.

The place is important because of its aesthetic significance.

The Forest Hill Hotel makes an important aesthetic contribution to the character and townscape of the town as one of the most prominent and distinctive buildings in Forest Hill that is valued by the community.
