= Queensland National Bank, Forest Hill =

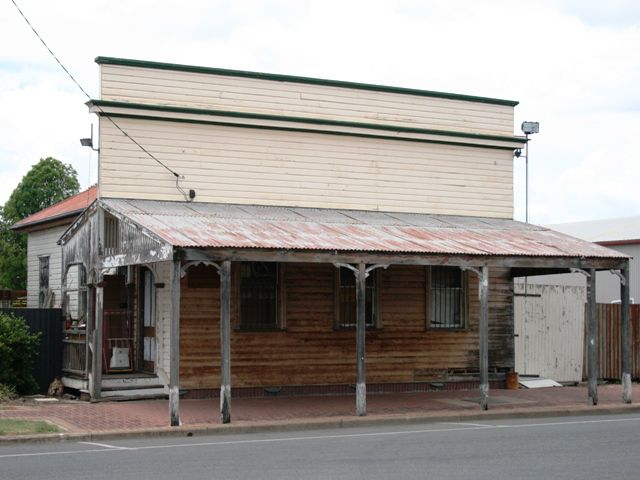
- Former Queensland National Bank, 2009

- Location within Queensland Location within Australia
- 27.5894°S 152.357°E
- Location: 3 Victoria Street, Forest Hill, Lockyer Valley Region, Queensland, Australia

History
- Design period: 1900–1914 (early 20th century)
- Built: c. 1909
- Built for: Queensland National Bank

Site notes
- Architectural style: Classicism

Queensland Heritage Register
- Official name: Shop, 3 Victoria Street, Forest Hill, Queensland National Bank
- Type: state heritage (built)
- Designated: 21 October 1992
- Reference no.: 600651
- Significant period: 1900s (fabric) c. 1909–1976 (historical use)
- Significant components: tank stand, residential accommodation – staff quarters

Queensland National Bank is a heritage-listed bank at 3 Victoria Street, Forest Hill, Lockyer Valley Region, Queensland, Australia. It was built c. 1909. It was added to the Queensland Heritage Register on 21 October 1992.

== History ==
This single-storey timber building was erected c. 1909 as offices for the Forest Hill branch of the powerful Queensland National Bank, established in 1872. The building was constructed on land leased, in November 1909, from Forest Hill property owner Allister McAllister. McAllister had acquired the site in 1897, as part of a larger block at the corner of Victoria and William Streets, on which he erected the Lockyer Hotel c. 1906. The new QNB building was erected adjacent to the hotel and close to the railway depot, in the commercial centre of the town. The Queensland National Bank first opened a branch office at Forest Hill on 10 September 1901, in leased premises. A c. 1908 photograph shows the branch occupying part of George Wyman's store in Victoria Street. It was the town's first bank, opened during the early 20th century growth of Forest Hill as a railhead and service centre, following closer agricultural settlement of the area in the late 1890s and early 1900s.

Until the 1880s, Forest Hill was part of the 20,000 acres (8,100 ha) Rosewood run, first taken up by DC McConnel in 1840, and later occupied by Kent & Wienholt, who worked the station in conjunction with their Jondaryan run. The Forest Hill land was heavily timbered, with some large gum swamps. The Ipswich to Toowoomba railway was surveyed between Laidley and Gatton in 1865, but a siding was not established in the Forest Hill area, about a mile and a half closer to Laidley than the present Forest Hill railway station, until c. 1881. Originally it was called Boyd's Siding, servicing the property of Mr AJ Boyd, about 4 miles (6.4 km) from the railway line. Boyd, the first agriculturalist in the area, planted an orchard and named his property Forest Hill, after which the siding was named in the early 1880s. This siding was shifted to the site of the present Forest Hill station c. 1887.

In 1886 and 1889, Kent & Wienholt cut up 3,500 acres (1,400 ha) south of the second Forest Hill siding, into farm selections. This was the impetus for the establishment of an agricultural community at Forest Hill, but the township of Forest Hill did not emerge until the late 1890s, following the Queensland government's 1896 repurchase of part of the Rosewood freehold, 6,000 acres (2,400 ha) of fertile black soil land on the northern side of the Forest Hill railway station. The Rosewood Estate was cut into blocks of 70 to 125 acres (51 ha), and sold at prices from £3 to £5/5/0 per acre, repayable over 20 years. The sale was part of a government initiative to encourage agricultural settlement of the rich West Moreton lands, by opening for selection nearly all the country between Lowood and Gatton.

In January 1903, the Board of the QNB decided to close the Forest Hill branch and transfer the business to Laidley, but this was reversed following protest from Forest Hill residents. The decision to remain was timely: a further 18,000 acres (7,300 ha) in the Lockyer Valley were cut up and sold as farms in 1903, and Forest Hill emerged as a thriving township. By 1908, Forest Hill was despatching more produce than either of the older and larger settlements of Gatton and Laidley, and of this, about 70 percent came from the farms on the repurchased estates. This boom corresponded with the erection of purpose-built bank premises for the QNB at Forest Hill, c. 1909.

The QNB, and later the National Bank, leased the site on which the bank building was erected, for over 60 years. The branch was closed temporarily on 2 February 1943, as part of the wartime rationalisation of bank branches in Australia, but was re-opened on 3 February 1947. In 1948 the Queensland National bank was amalgamated with the National Bank of Australasia Ltd, and the Forest Hill office then became part of the National Bank network.

In 1970, the leased land on which the bank building stood was purchased by the National Bank from the estate of Miss E McAllister, but the branch at Forest Hill survived only another 6 years, closing on 16 June 1976. The decision to close the Forest Hill branch after nearly 75 years, reflected a trend, occasioned by improved transport and communications, for district residents to purchase goods and services at the larger centres of Gatton and Laidley. Following closure of the branch, the land and premises were sold, and the bank fittings were removed. The building has served since as retail premises.

== Description ==
Occupying the north western corner of a triangular site near the intersection of Victoria and William Streets, the former bank is a single-storeyed building, slightly elevated on stumps, with chamferboard walls. Rectangular in plan, this timber-framed structure is distinguished by a restrained ornamental facade of asymmetrical design which faces Victoria Street.

The Victoria street facade consists of a parapet wall marking the western alignment, a wide skillion roofed awning which covers the footpath in front of the building and an attached entry porch on its northern side. The parapet wall is decorated by timber mouldings forming a simplified entablature. Behind the parapet is a simple pitched corrugated iron roof that terminates in a hip at rear of the building.

The awning is supported by a row of timber posts positioned at the edge of the footpath nearest the road. The posts are decorated with timber brackets and double timber posts emphasise the outer corners of the awning. Below the line of the awning are three double hung timber windows facing the street. At the northern end of the street facade are steps leading to the entry porch. Both the awning and the parapet wall extend beyond the main part of the building forming a front for the attached porch. The pitched roof over the entry porch together with the skillion roof of the footpath awning forms an unequal gable facing north which is infilled with timber battens. The porch has a timber balustrade and decorative arches.

A timber panelled door opens from the entry porch into the main room which takes up the front part of the building. Behind this is a larger room on the northern side and a smaller windowless room on southern side. The building has no hallway being simply a series of interconnected rooms. At the rear of the building are a number of smaller rooms connected by various doors and windows. Ceilings and internal walls are lined with v-jointed timber boards.

The northern elevation has three windows as well as the main entry door and a minimal roof overhang. The southern wall is a plain chamferboard parapet wall, previously concealed by the adjoining building which has been demolished. The rear or eastern facade has a minimal roof overhang. Timber steps lead from the centrally positioned back door to the rear yard. A rainwater tank is located adjacent to the south east corner of the building.

== Heritage listing ==
Shop, 3 Victoria Street, Forest Hill was listed on the Queensland Heritage Register on 21 October 1992 having satisfied the following criteria.

The place is important in demonstrating the evolution or pattern of Queensland's history.

The former Queensland National Bank, Forest Hill, erected c. 1909, survives as evidence of the early 20th century development of Forest Hill as a focal point and commercial centre for a prosperous agricultural district. In particular, the building illustrates the close relationship between the Queensland National Bank and the commercial activity centred on Forest Hill, prior to the Second World War.

The place is important in demonstrating the principal characteristics of a particular class of cultural places.

A restrained and economical design, the building demonstrates the priority of the street in country town commercial architecture through the elaboration of its front facade and the simplicity of the building behind. A distinctive bank image is created through the use of classical details and the discrete side entrance. The intact interior is an example of the domestic and work environments provided in early 20th century banks in smaller towns.

The place is important because of its aesthetic significance.

A restrained and economical design, the building demonstrates the priority of the street in country town commercial architecture through the elaboration of its front facade and the simplicity of the building behind. A distinctive bank image is created through the use of classical details and the discrete side entrance. The intact interior is an example of the domestic and work environments provided in early 20th century banks in smaller towns.

The place has a special association with the life or work of a particular person, group or organisation of importance in Queensland's history.

It has an important association with the former Queensland National Bank, which contributed substantially to the economic development of Queensland in the late 19th and early 20th centuries.
