= Forest Hill War Memorial =

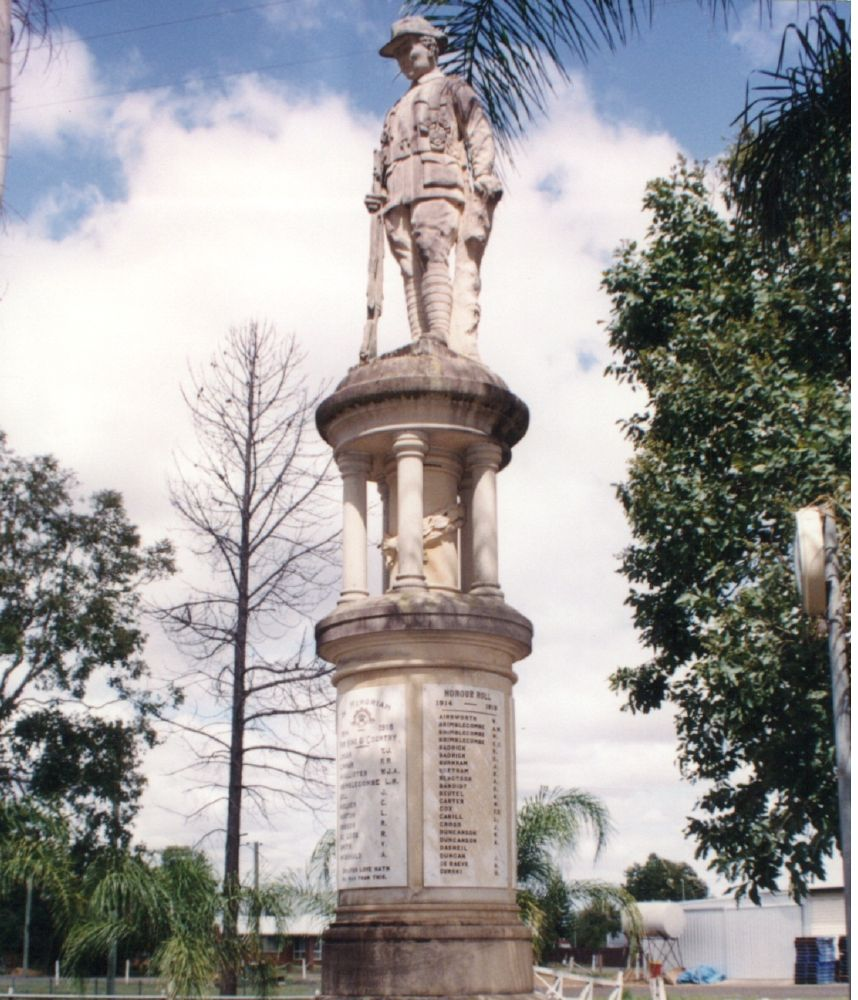
- Forest Hill War Memorial, 2009

- Location within Queensland Location within Australia
- 27.5888°S 152.3569°E
- Location: Gordon Street, Forest Hill, Lockyer Valley Region, Queensland, Australia

History
- Design period: 1919–1930s (interwar period)
- Built: 1921

Queensland Heritage Register
- Official name: Forest Hill War Memorial, Forest Hill Soldiers Memorial
- Type: state heritage (built)
- Designated: 21 October 1992
- Reference no.: 600649
- Significant period: 1921– (social); 1921 (historical, fabric)
- Significant components: memorial surrounds/railings, memorial – soldier statue, flagpole/flagstaff

Forest Hill War Memorial is a heritage-listed memorial at Gordon Street, Forest Hill, Lockyer Valley Region, Queensland. Australia. It was built in 1921. It is also known as Forest Hill Soldiers Memorial. It was added to the Queensland Heritage Register on 21 October 1992.

== History ==
The Forest Hill War Memorial was erected by the Forest Hill Memorial League in 1921, in a small reserve adjacent to the railway line. The memorial was unveiled on 26 March 1921.

The township of Forest Hill developed during the 1890s, following the repurchase by the Queensland Government of 6,000 acres (2,400 ha) from the Rosewood station. Although the Ipswich to Toowoomba railway had been surveyed between Laidley and Gatton in 1865, it was not until c. 1881 that a siding was established in the Forest Hill area. Originally known as Boyd's siding, it was shifted to the site of the present Forest Hill railway station c. 1887. As the surrounding country was progressively opened and settled by farmers, Forest Hill became a busy transport centre for agricultural produce, often requiring special trains to be run from Forest Hill.

The masons for the monument were PJ Lowther and Sons of Brisbane, who were also responsible for memorials in Brisbane (the pedestal for the South African memorial), Blackbutt, Murgon, Goodna, Mount Perry and Tiaro. It is possible that the monument was actually carved by Charles Lowther, sculptor son of this Brisbane masonry family, and an ex-serviceman who fought with the Australian Light Horse in the First World War.

The monument cost £300, and was unveiled by five mothers of fallen soldiers. A plate with the names of World War II servicemen was added at a later stage.

== Description ==
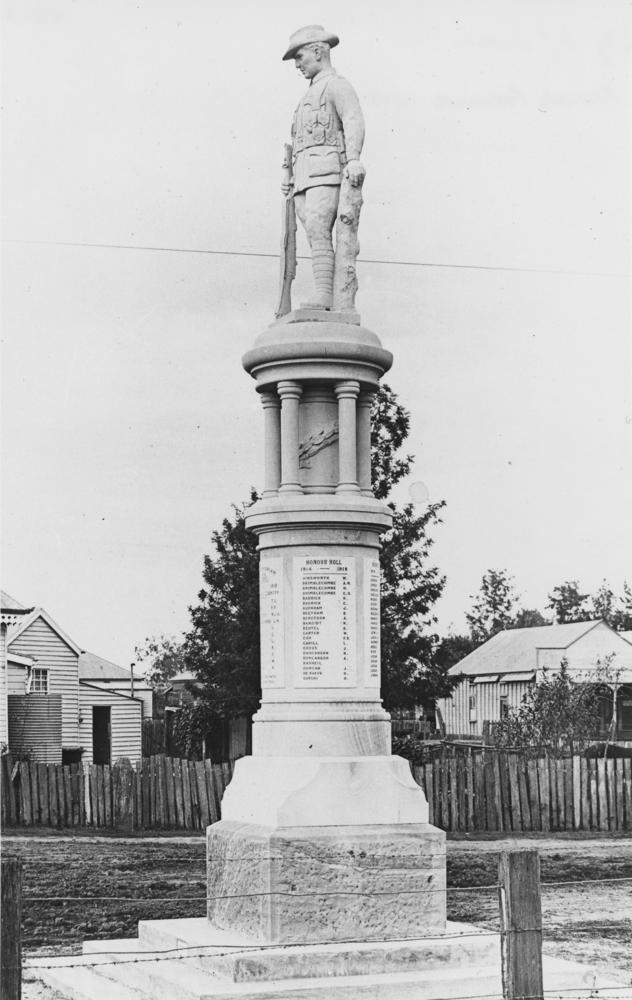
Forest Hill War Memorial

The Forest Hill War Memorial is located in a small park at the end of Victoria Street, completing a vista down the town's main street. The finely carved memorial stands approximately four and a half metres high, and consists of a life-size grey sandstone Digger statue on a tall sandstone pedestal. The statue faces eastwards, in the direction of an adjacent steel flagstaff. The site is marked out with small steel fence posts and chains.

The pedestal rests on a plinth of blocked rusticated brown sandstone on a stepped concrete base. The lower portion of the pedestal is columnar, with leaded marble plaques, and rests on a block with shaped corners. The upper portion has a central wreathed column surrounded by colonnettes, and the statue is mounted on rounded base which caps the colonnettes.

The memorial contributes to the townscape of Forest Hill in its axial location at the end of the main street.

== Heritage listing ==
Forest Hill War Memorial was listed on the Queensland Heritage Register on 21 October 1992 having satisfied the following criteria.

The place is important in demonstrating the evolution or pattern of Queensland's history.

The Forest Hill War Memorial is important in demonstrating the pattern of Queensland's history as evidence of an era of widespread expression of Australian patriotism and nationalism, during and following the First World War.

The place is important in demonstrating the principal characteristics of a particular class of cultural places.

As a "Digger" statue, it demonstrates the principal characteristics of a commemorative structure erected as an enduring record of a major historical event.

The place is important because of its aesthetic significance.

It exhibits aesthetic characteristics which are valued by the community, in particular the fine craft work of the sandstone carving and the aesthetic contribution of the monument to the townscape of Forest Hill in a vista down the main street.

The place has a strong or special association with a particular community or cultural group for social, cultural or spiritual reasons.

It has a strong association with the community as evidence of the impact of a major historical event.
