= Forest Hill, Queensland =

Forest Hill
- Town
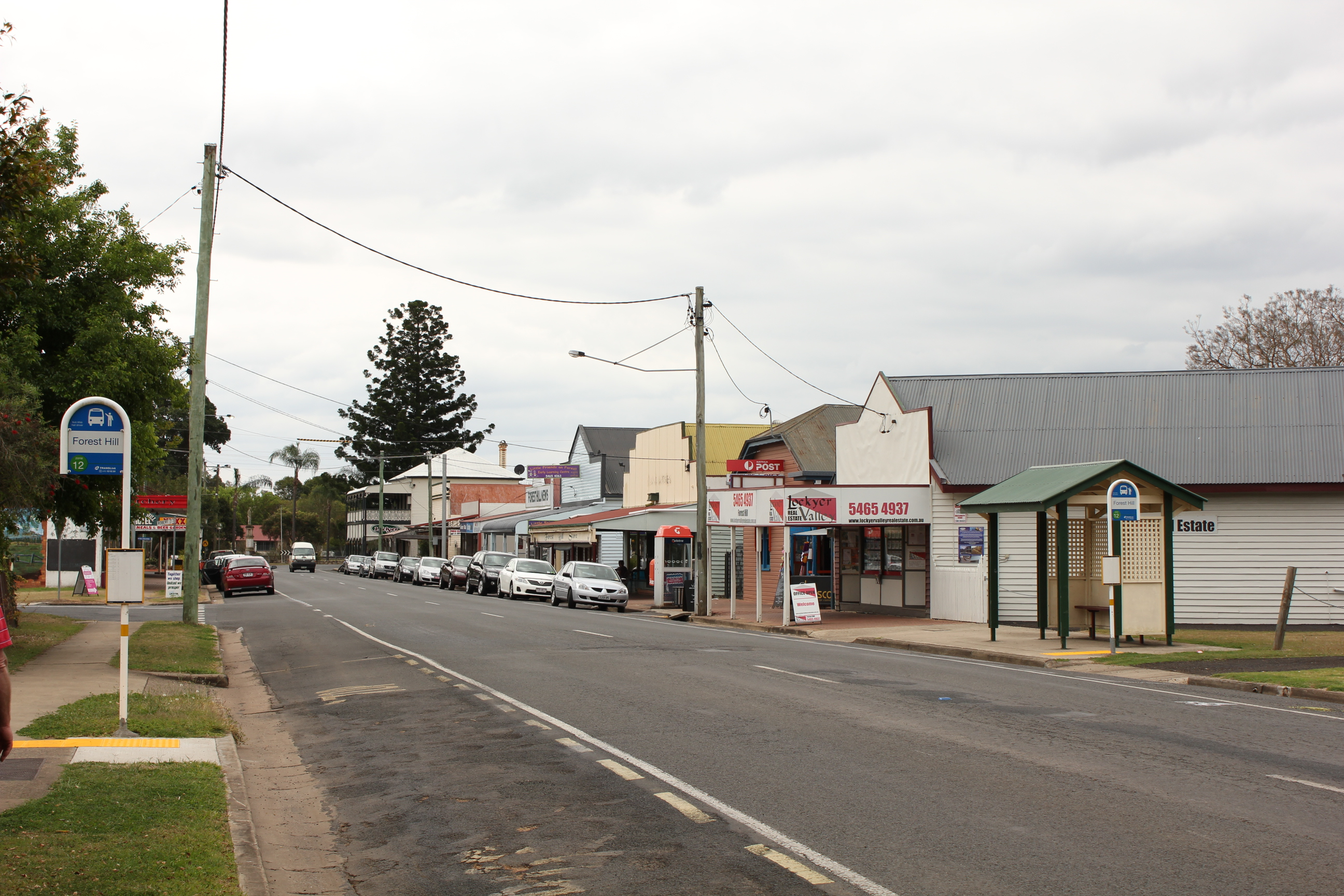
- Forest Hill main street

- Interactive map of Forest Hill
- Coordinates: 27.5897°S 152.3555°E
- Country: Australia
- State: Queensland
- LGA: Lockyer Valley Region
- Location: 8.6 km (5.3 mi) ESE of Gatton; 48.7 km (30.3 mi) W of Ipswich; 50.4 km (31.3 mi) E of Toowoomba; 85.4 km (53.1 mi) WSW of Brisbane
- Established: 1880

Government
  - State electorate: Lockyer
  - Federal division: Wright

Area
  - Total: 26.7 km^{2} (10.3 sq mi)

Population
  - Total: 935 (2021 census)
  - Density: 35.02/km^{2} (90.70/sq mi)
- Postcode: 4342
Localities around Forest Hill
College View	Crowley Vale	Glenore Grove
Lawes	Forest Hill	Plainland
Glen Cairn	Laidley Heights	Laidley North

Forest Hill is a rural town and locality in the Lockyer Valley Region, Queensland, Australia. In the 2021 census, the locality of Forest Hill had a population of 935 people.

== Geography ==
The town is located 83 kilometres (52 mi) west of the state capital, Brisbane and 53 kilometres (33 mi) east of the regional centre of Toowoomba.

Forest Hill railway station is an abandoned railway station on the Main Line railway (27.5880°S 152.3560°E).

There is an aircraft landing ground between Gatton Laidley Road and the railway line (27.6050°S 152.3726°E).

== History ==
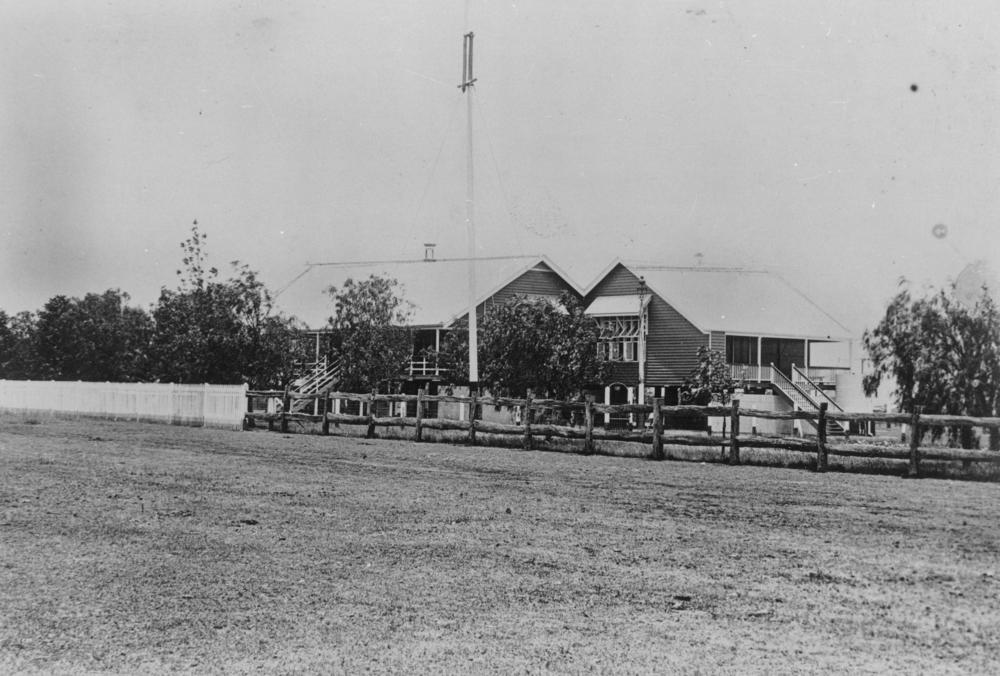
Forest Hill State School, 1914

In 1880, AJ Boyd purchased 975 acres (394.6 hectares) of land from the Queensland Government for reportedly five shillings an acre. The land was located approximately six kilometres south from the Main Line railway, towards Woodlands. Boyd named this property Forest Hill, after seeing Allan Cunningham's map of the region where he had marked "extensive indifferent forest ground". A stopping place was established on the Main Line railway to service the property called Boyd's Siding which later changed its name to Forest Hill.

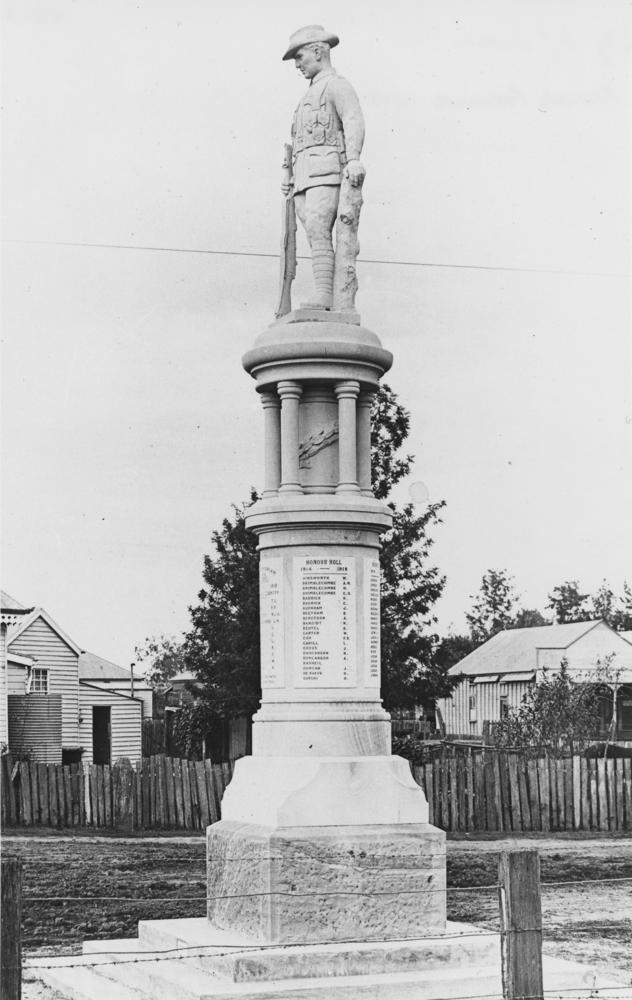
Forest Hill War Memorial

Forest Hill was recorded as a railway station in 1881 and was located one kilometre east down the line from its later location. The railway station moved to its later location in 1886. In the 1920s, it was Queensland's largest produce loading centre. However, the increasing use of road transport for farm produce led to the railway station's closure on 3 July 1992. The main railway station was relocated to the Queensland Pioneer Steam Railway at Swanbank. The railway station waiting room was restored and relocated to Anzac Park (also known as Forest Hill Place) in Forest Hill.

The first Forest Hill Post Office opened on 1 February 1890 at the railway station (replacing a receiving office named Forest Hill Siding open since 1889). The office moved to its current site at 40 Victoria Street on 7 January 1908.

Forest Hill Provisional School opened on 23 January 1893, becoming a state school in 1899.

St Thomas's Anglican Church was dedicated on 2 August 1903 by Archdeacon Arthur Evan David. Its closure on 3 May 2005 was approved by Assistant Bishop Rob Nolan.

Forest Hill was once home to five hotels, a hospital, a bakery and butcher, and was the largest rail freight hub for agricultural produce in Queensland.

The Forest Hill War Memorial was erected to commemorate those in the district who had died or served in World War I. It was unveiled by five mothers of deceased soldiers on 26 March 1921.

During the 2010–11 Queensland floods, much of the population of Forest Hill was required to be evacuated by helicopter to nearby Gatton to avoid rapidly rising floodwaters.

== Demographics ==
In the 2016 census, the locality of Forest Hill had a population of 968 people.

In the 2021 census, the locality of Forest Hill had a population of 935 people.

== Heritage listings ==
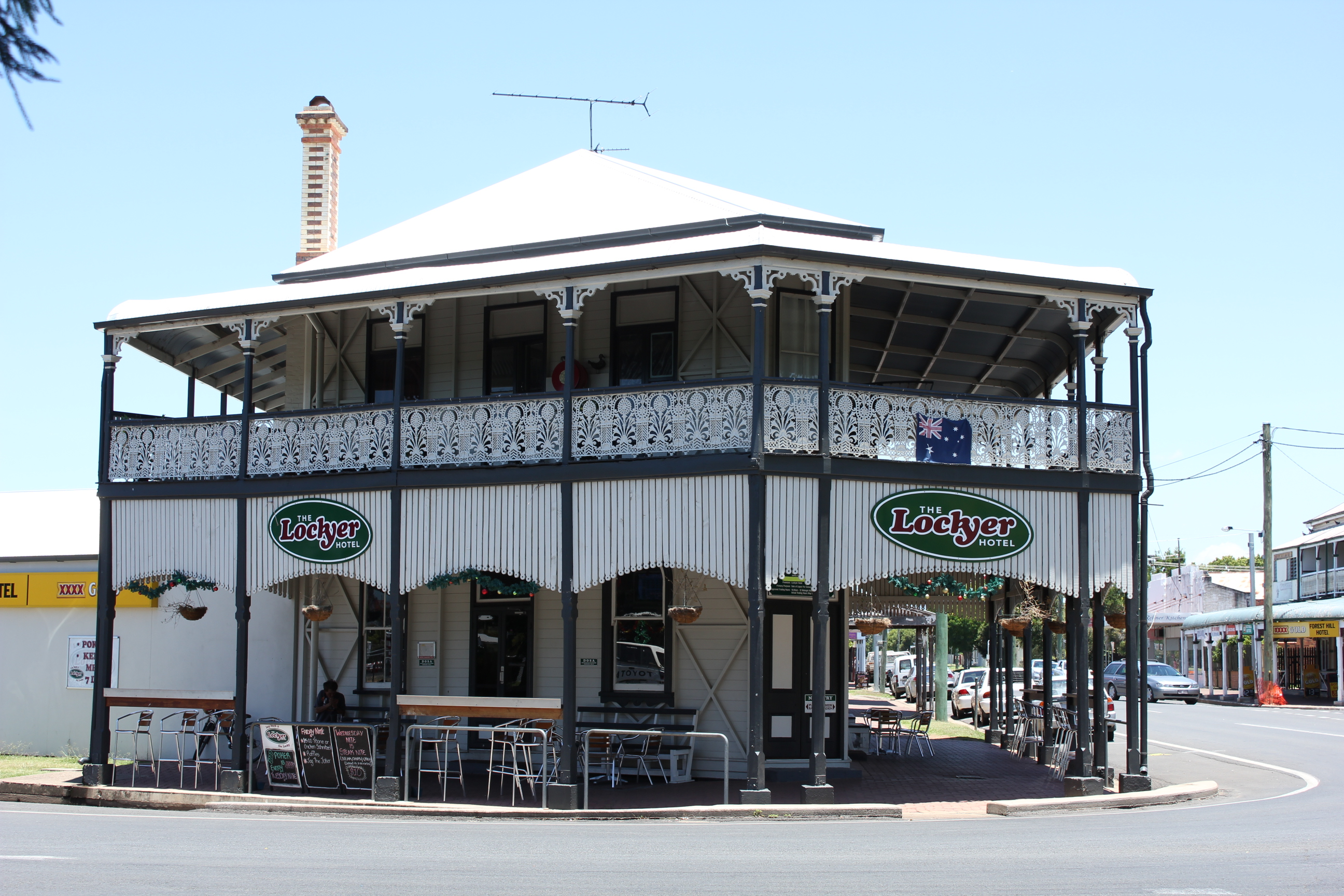
The Lockyer Hotel, 2012

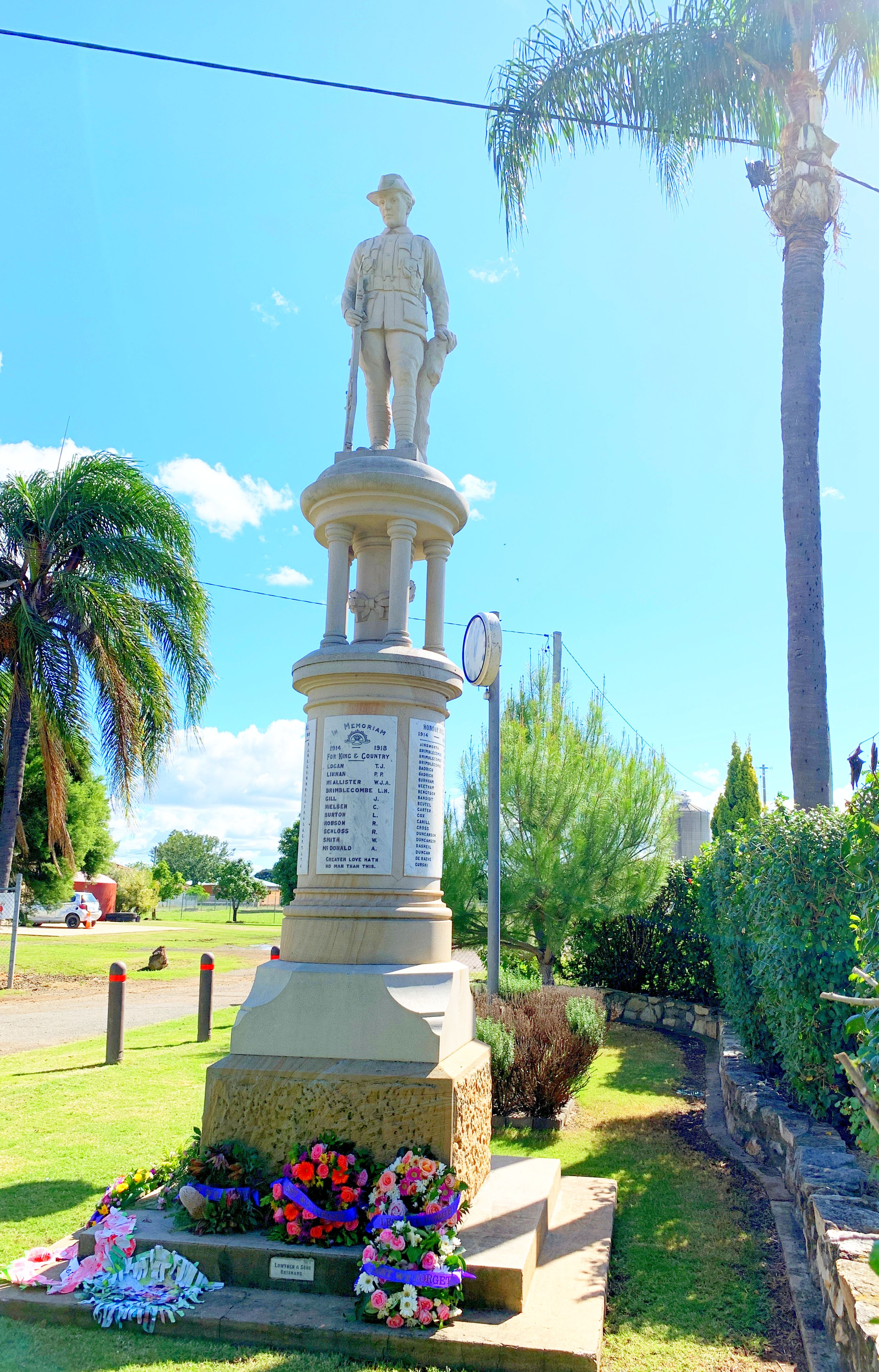
Forest Hill War Memorial, after Anzac Day, 2024

Forest Hill has a number of heritage-listed sites, including:

- Forest Hill State School, 15 Church Street
- Forest Hill War Memorial, Gordon Street
- Lockyer Hotel, Victoria Street
- Queensland National Bank, 3 Victoria Street
- Forest Hill Hotel, 38 William Street

== Education ==
Forest Hill State School is a government primary (Prep–6) school for boys and girls at 15 Church Street (27.5905°S 152.3543°E). In 2018, the school had an enrolment of 137 students with 10 teachers (9 full-time equivalent) and 10 non-teaching staff (5 full-time equivalent).

There are no secondary schools in Forest Hill. The nearest government secondary schools are Laidley State High School in Laidley to the south-east and Lockyer District State High School in Gatton to the west.

== Attractions ==
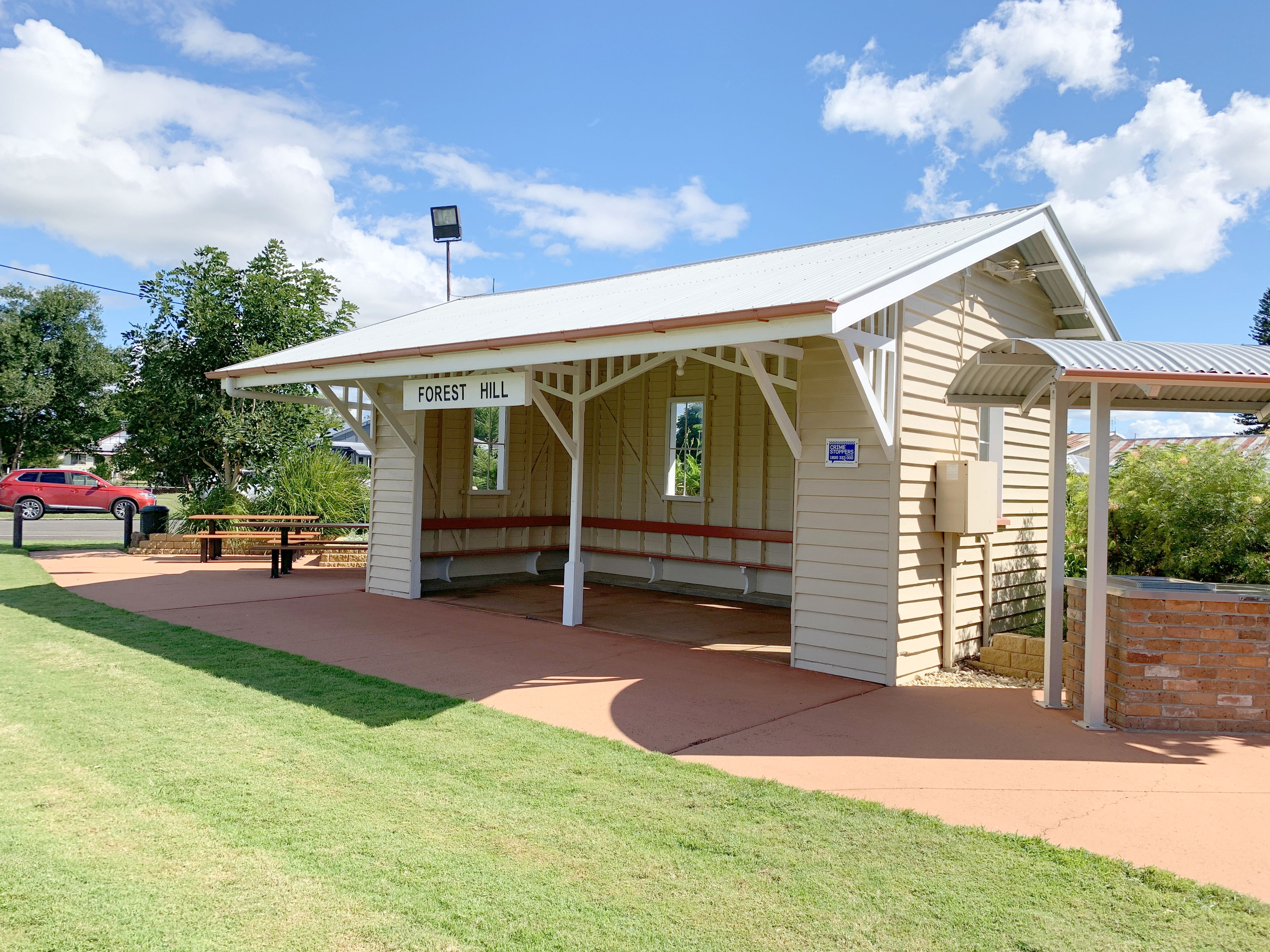
Waiting room from the former Forest Hill railway station, restored and placed in Anzac Park, 2024

The former waiting room at Forest Hill railway station is in Anzac Park.

== Amenities ==
Forest Hill Post Office is at 40 Victoria Street (27.5901°S 152.3568°E). It is also a cafe called Cafe 4342 (the postcode for the area) and gift shop.

St Joseph's Catholic Church is at 8–10 Hunt Street (27.5882°S 152.3587°E).

Forest Hill's Fire and Rescue Station is at 4 Williams Street beside the railway line (27.5888°S 152.3563°E).

Forest Hill's State Emergency Service facilities are at 24 Railway Street beside Furley Park (27.5872°S 152.3557°E).

Despite the name, Forest Hill Cemetery is on Logan Road in neighbouring College View).
