= St Anne's Anglican Church, Jondaryan =

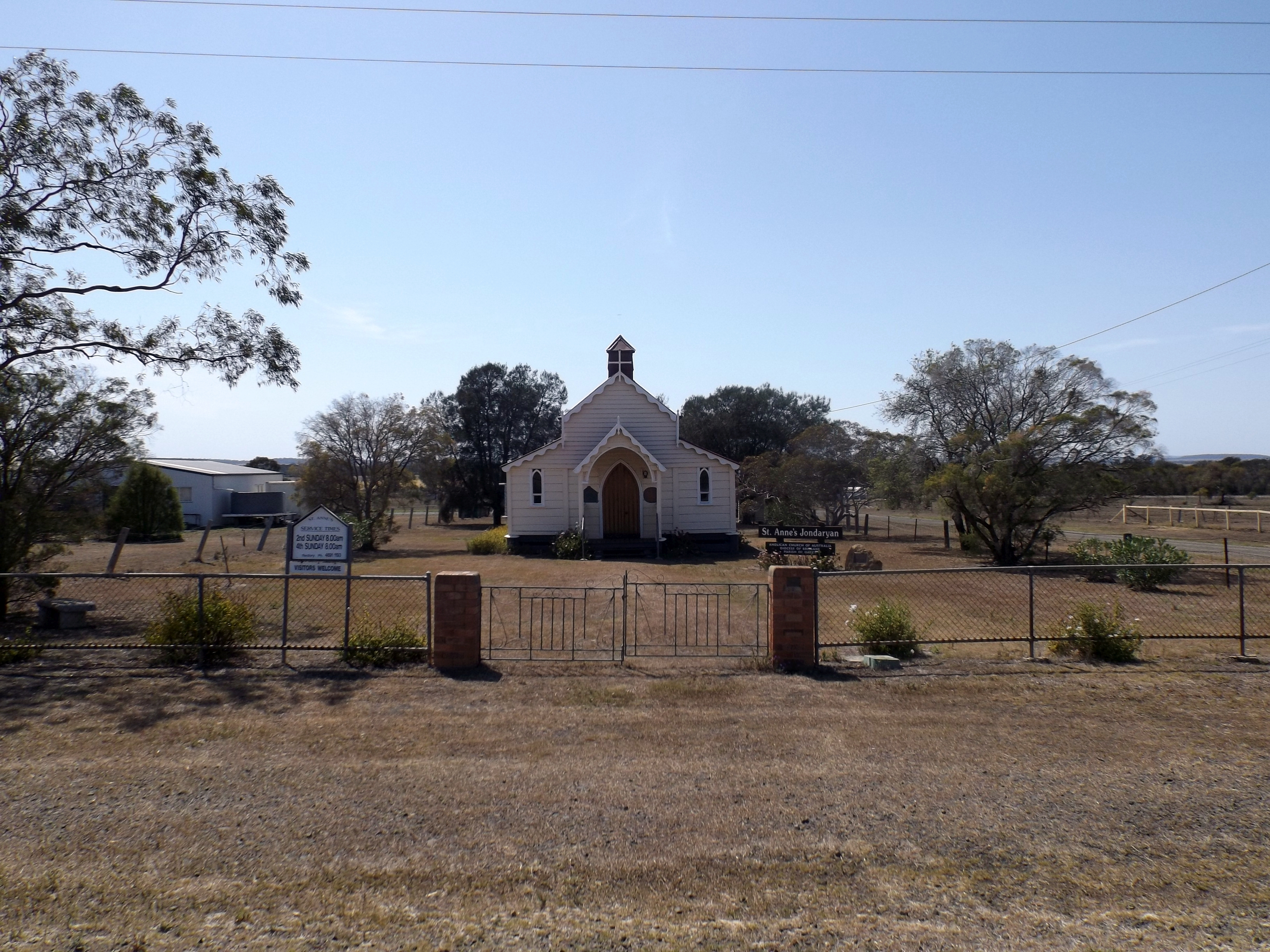
- Church building and grounds, 2014

- Location within Queensland Location within Australia
- 27.3798°S 151.5864°E
- Location: Evanslea Road, Jondaryan, Toowoomba Region, Queensland, Australia

History
- Design period: 1840s - 1860s (mid-19th century)
- Built: 1859 - 1893

Site notes
- Architectural style: Gothic

Queensland Heritage Register
- Official name: St Annes Anglican Church, Jondaryan, Jondaryan Homestead church, St Anne's Church of England
- Type: state heritage (built)
- Designated: 21 October 1992
- Reference no.: 600634
- Significant period: 1850s-1890s (historical); 1850s-1860s (fabric) ongoing (social)
- Significant components: furniture/fittings, church, views to
- Builders: Hugh Bradford

St Anne's Anglican Church is a heritage-listed church at Evanslea Road, Jondaryan, Toowoomba Region, Queensland, Australia. It is also known as the Jondaryan Homestead Church and St Anne's Church of England. It was built in 1859 by Hugh Bradford as a private chapel for the former Jondaryan pastoral station, and the first service was held by preacher Benjamin Glennie late that year. The church also served the new township of Jondaryan, and was moved to its present site, with alterations, in 1893.

Regular services are still held at the church today, which is now a minor tourist attraction. It is the oldest surviving church on the Darling Downs, and one of the oldest surviving churches in Queensland. It was added to the Queensland Heritage Register on 21 October 1992. Two other sites associated with the former pastoral station, Jondaryan Homestead and Jondaryan Woolshed, are separately listed on the Heritage Register.

== History ==
The timber slab church of St Anne's is one of Queensland's oldest churches and was constructed in 1859 as a private chapel originally located at Jondaryan Station.

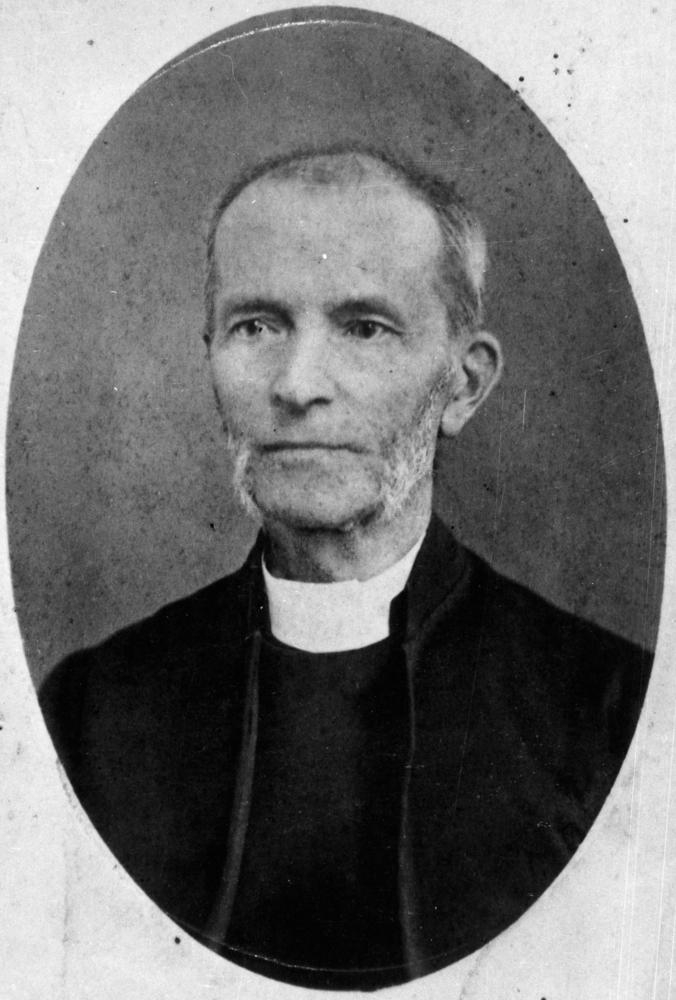
Reverend Benjamin Glennie

Jondaryan was originally taken up in 1842 by Charles Coxen and was first run by his nephew, Henry. After changing hands several times, it was purchased in 1856 by Robert and Edwin Tooth, who were also involved in establishing the Tooth and Co. brewery and the Colonial Sugar Refining Company. In 1858 it was leased by Kent and Weinholt who owned adjoining properties and was purchased by them in 1863 following Tooth's bankruptcy. Jondaryan was managed for them by James C. White. Stations at the time had small "village" communities for employees, there being a considerable number of people living on Jondaryan apart from the manager and his family. Pastoral stations provided accommodation for workers and facilities such as a store, blacksmiths and other trades essential for running a station in an isolated area. By 1870 Jondaryan had over 500 employees. The first itinerant minister for the Darling Downs was the energetic pioneer clergyman Reverend Benjamin Glennie. In 1848 he was appointed to serve Moreton Bay and could only make infrequent visits, but from 1850 he was based at Drayton. He conducted services at a number of stations on the Downs as the first church was not built until 1856 in Toowoomba.

Churchgoing was important to the social structure of the community as well as spiritually and in 1859, James White is said to have arranged for an unknown Melbourne architect to provide a design for a church for Jondaryan. The station underwent an extensive building program from 1860 including building a new homestead, and the construction of the church may have been a first step in this upgrading of facilities. It was constructed by an Irish carpenter called Hugh Bradford and used materials from Jondaryan and ordered in from Toowoomba. The first service in the new church was conducted by the Reverend Benjamin Glennie, on 23 October 1859, an event recorded in his diary. A Sunday school was also run by Mr White's wife, Anne, for children living on the station. Though Glennie was Anglican, the church was available for the use of other denominations amongst the Jondaryan workers.

A township developed nearby also called Jondaryan and became more important after the coming of the Western railway line in 1868. Even so, its fortunes were closely tied up with those of the station and the station church of St Anne's remained the town's place of worship.

During the severe floods of 1893, the church was the only building on the station above water level. Later in that year it was decided to move the church to its present site, about 1.6 kilometres (0.99 mi) from the Jondaryan township to a site donated by Thomas Taylor who owned the hotel there and also presented a carved lectern to the church.

When the building was re-located, a vestry was added, the ceiling and sanctuary were lined and the nave floor was lowered. It passed from private ownership to the Anglican Diocese of Brisbane and was dedicated on 18 December 1893. A carved Bishop's chair of Queensland beech was presented at the time. The pine pews and silky oak prayer book case were made by the Jondaryan station carpenter.

In 1988–1890 reinforced concrete piers were introduced along the north and south walls to support steel beams inserted above the original timber stumps, which are no longer load bearing.

Regular services are still held at the church, which is also a tourist attraction.

== Description ==
St Anne's comprises a four bay nave with a clerestory. It is entered by a small gabled porch and has a chancel with a raised floor and a lower independent gable roof. The vestry on the south has a lower floor level than the church and is reached by steps. The building is on timber stumps and the roof is clad with corrugated iron and has a small belfry at the western end. There are scalloped barge boards to the front and rear of the building. The construction is largely of vertical slab and batten construction with the chamfered timber slabs of the east and west clerestory walls, the vestry and the lower gable walls laid horizontally with the upper section clad in weatherboards. The windows are narrow lancets and the clerestory lights are set in square frames. The sanctuary window is set with borders of coloured glass.

Inside, the roof is supported by kingpost trusses and square hardwood posts. The walls of the clerestory and chancel are lined in horizontal beaded pine boards. The adzed ironbark slabs of the walls are exposed in the aisles. It is simply furnished with an altar table, lectern, altar rails and timber pews.

== Heritage listing ==
St Annes Anglican Church, Jondaryan was listed on the Queensland Heritage Register on 21 October 1992 having satisfied the following criteria.

The place is important in demonstrating the evolution or pattern of Queensland's history.

St Anne's Church demonstrates the pattern of Queensland history by providing evidence for the way in which early pastoral runs were run as small communities. Jondaryan, run by the Tooths, an important pioneer pastoral family on the Darling Downs, had a "village" for its employees and their families

The place demonstrates rare, uncommon or endangered aspects of Queensland's cultural heritage.

St Anne's is the earliest surviving church on the Downs and one of the oldest in Queensland.

The place has potential to yield information that will contribute to an understanding of Queensland's history.

It preserves examples of early building techniques using locally available materials.

The place is important because of its aesthetic significance.

It has considerable aesthetic appeal.

The place has a strong or special association with a particular community or cultural group for social, cultural or spiritual reasons.

It has a long association with families of Jondaryan and the community in and around Jondaryan township.

The place has a special association with the life or work of a particular person, group or organisation of importance in Queensland's history.

It is also associated with the life and work of the Reverend Benjamin Glennie, the first incumbent Anglican clergyman on the Downs.
