= Jondaryan Homestead =

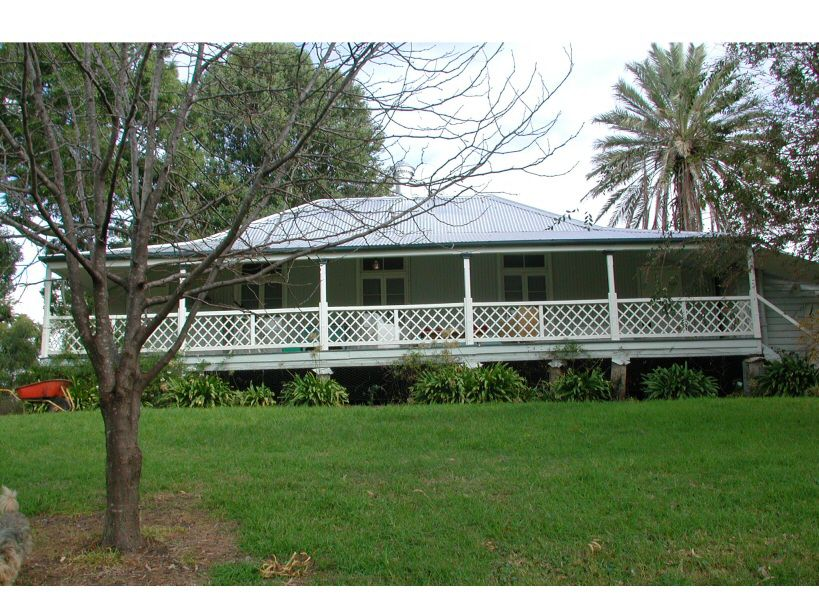
- Jondaryan Homestead, 2003

- Location within Queensland Location within Australia
- 27.4009°S 151.5753°E
- Location: Evanslea Road, Jondaryan, Toowoomba Region, Queensland, Australia

History
- Design period: 1840s - 1860s (mid-19th century)
- Built: 1844 - 1937

Queensland Heritage Register
- Official name: Jondaryan Homestead
- Type: state heritage (landscape, built)
- Designated: 21 October 1992
- Reference no.: 600635
- Significant period: 1840s-1860s (historical); 1840s-1860s (fabric)
- Significant components: dairy/creamery, store/s / storeroom / storehouse, conservatory / glasshouse / greenhouse, residential accommodation - main house, residential accommodation - shearers' quarters, stalls - livestock, meat house, butcher's shop / killing shed / slaughter house (pastoral), garden/grounds, out building/s, kitchen/kitchen house, stables, chimney/chimney stack

Jondaryan Homestead is a heritage-listed homestead at Evanslea Road, Jondaryan, Toowoomba Region, Queensland, Australia. It was the base of the former Jondaryan pastoral station, which was originally taken up in 1840, and at one time was the largest freehold station in Queensland. The site contains the current house, which was built after the original was destroyed by fire in 1937, the original kitchen dating from 1844, and a kitchen, butcher's shop, shearer's quarters, stables, dairy, toilet block and store, many dating from the 1860s. It also contains the remains of horse stalls, a slaughterhouse, hide store, and Chinese gardener's glasshouse. It was added to the Queensland Heritage Register on 21 October 1992.

The original pastoral station was first subdivided in 1908, with further sales of land in the 1920s, and it ceased to exist as a station when the owners, Jondaryan Estates, went into voluntary liquidation in 1946. The homestead site and 2,000 acres (810 ha) of land remained with the grandson of the company's founder, but the remainder of the property, including the Jondaryan Woolshed, was sold and subdivided. The woolshed is now a museum and tourist attraction, and is separately listed on the Queensland Heritage Register.

== History ==
Jondaryan station was originally taken up in 1840 by Henry Dennis and the homestead site today includes a number of early buildings, including the kitchen from the original homestead erected in 1844 and several outbuildings constructed during the early 1860s.

In 1840 the search for pastoral land in New South Wales extended north to the Darling Downs. The Leslie brothers followed the path of Allan Cunningham onto the Downs in 1840 and established at Canning Downs the first station in the district. Other squatters soon followed. Jondaryan station was taken up by Henry Dennis, an employee of Sir Richard Todd Scougall of Liverpool Plains station in New South Wales, during this initial push into the region. Along with the Jondaryan lands he claimed the Jimbour Station and Myall Creek properties for Scougall. However, he failed to register the claim to Jondaryan and in 1842 Charles Coxen took up the estate.

Coxen was born at Ramsgate in Kent, England, in 1809 and arrived in Sydney in 1834. He had a strong interest in natural history and was a founding member of the Queensland Museum in 1862. Coxen was also active in the Queensland Philosophical Society, which was formed in 1859, and held several public offices during his career. Although chiefly known as a naturalist and politician, Charles was also associated with a large number of pastoral properties in southern Queensland. His initial pastoral experience was at Yarrundi station in the Hunter River valley, the property of his older brother, Stephen Coxen. From there he moved to a property on the Peel River as manager and in 1842 instructed his nephew, Henry William Coxen, to move to Jondaryan as superintendent. Henry Coxen was to become one of Queensland's most prosperous landowners, with an interest in at least 17 grazing leases, and at Jondaryan he was responsible for overseeing the initial improvements to the station.

By November 1843, when the Commissioner of Crown Lands for New South Wales visited Jondaryan, the site included 3 huts reputedly built by James Chatman, a convict carpenter who accompanied Henry Coxen on the trek from Yarrundi to Jondaryan. At this time there were just 7 residents at the station, but by the following year that number had doubled. The Commissioner of Crown Lands records for 1844 indicate that the number of huts on the site had decreased to 2, but 4 stables had been erected by that time and work began on the first house at Jondaryan. Chatman, who had obtained a ticket-of-leave in March 1844, was again employed to build what was believed to be a rudimentary slab or bark structure. However, the ironstone ridge on which this house was built attracted lightning strikes during storms and in late 1844 it was decided to erect a new residence 2 miles (3.2 km) upstream, where the present homestead now stands. It was constructed from sturdy iron bark slabs and floors, and remained in use as the main house at Jondaryan until 30 December 1937 when it was destroyed by fire. The kitchen, which remains on site, is the only surviving part of the original house. At much the same time that this house was being built, other slab structures were erected to support the workings of the station, including a small shearing shed and yard.

The physical development of Jondaryan in the mid-1840s is also reflected in the increase in the station's holdings. By 1845, the size of the property had risen from the original 13,000 acres (5,300 ha) to 65,000 acres (26,000 ha), and was stocked with both sheep and cattle. At this time, the land was owned by the Crown and occupied by licence. In 1847, the regulations regarding land settlement were changed and the lands of Jondaryan were converted to leasehold tenure. After Charles Coxen disposed of his interests in Jondaryan in 1845, the property passed to James Macabrieu Andrews and Robert Tertius Campbell. Campbell was grandson of Robert Campbell, one of Australia's earliest settlers, and was Director of the Bank of New South Wales and Bank of Australasia. He never resided at Jondaryan, preferring instead to stay in Sydney and to leave Andrews in charge of managing the property. In 1850, Campbell transferred his interest to John Gilchrist, Andrews' brother-in-law, before the leasehold was sold in 1854 to Donald Coutts and Walter Gray. In c. 1855 Coutts and Grey applied to purchase the freehold on a block comprising the homestead and woolshed.

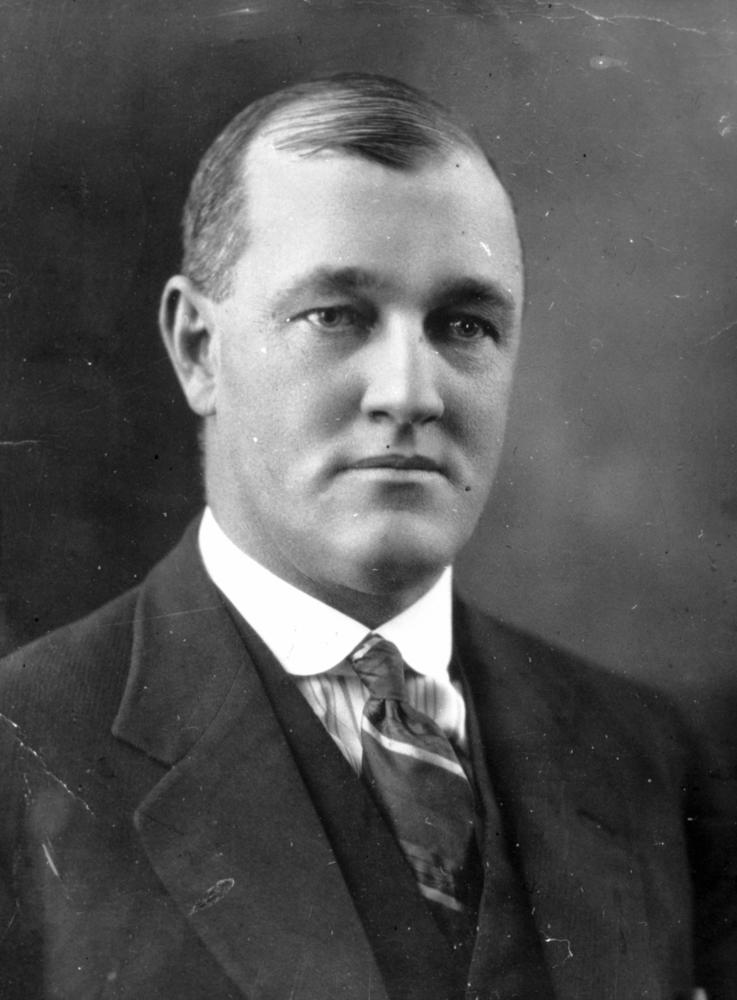
William Kent, c 1930

Further leasehold land was added to Jondaryan by the mid-1850s, with its total area covering around 125,000 acres (51,000 ha) when brothers Robert and Edwin Tooth acquired the leasehold in 1856. They also made the last payment on the freehold block purchased in c. 1855. The Tooth brothers were merchants and brewers, with an interest in the bank of New South Wales as well as the Colonial Sugar Refining Company established in 1855. They resided in Sydney during their tenure of Jondaryan. James Charles White was manager of the property and continued there for 12 years after William Kent and Edward Wienholt became sub-lessees of Jondaryan in 1858. For the next ten years, Jondaryan entered a phase of prosperity and growth as conditions on the Darling Downs allowed pastoralists to accumulate previously unparalleled profits. Some of these profits were used to purchase portions of the leaseholding. By 1867, more than 22,000 acres (8,900 ha) of Jondaryan's 154 square miles of land had been purchased under pre-emptive right, making Jondaryan one of the largest freehold properties of the district at that time.

Profits from pastoralism were also used by Jondaryan's owners to improve the homestead site and station records indicate significant building activities were being carried on during the early 1860s. In 1860, the main residence was renovated, perhaps in anticipation of Governor Bowen's visit the following year, and quarters for the station's shearers were erected. A new butcher's shop, store, hides and tallow house, stables and St Anne's Anglican Church were erected around this time, and the Jondaryan Woolshed, was also completed during the early 1860s. As a homestead complex, Jondaryan had reached a state of completion during the 1860s, which was reflected upon in The Queenslander in 1922: "cottages for employees, stables and enclosures for stud stock, and other buildings make quite a little township of themselves, and add to the completeness of the station". For an earlier visitor to the site, who is quoted in Jondaryan Woolshed (1998), the head station "was a very comfortable residence, very similar to the country gentlemen's house in England, except that it was all on one floor with a verandah all round and built of wood, and therefore covered a considerable extent of ground. It was surrounded by a vineyard, a garden full of flowers and fruit and vegetables, with a nice stream of water flowing past the front garden, where one could indulge in the luxury of a swim".

In 1863, Kent and Weinholt acquired Jondaryan station from the Tooth brothers for £108,000 and they formed a company, which they ultimately called Jondaryan Estates. With an interest in some 40 holdings in southern and central Queensland, Jondaryan Estates became one of Queensland's largest pastoral companies. Jondaryan station continued to grow through the 1870s and 1880s, with a combined area of more than 300,000 acres (120,000 ha) of leasehold and freehold land. During the 1890s, despite the increase in freehold land to over 162,000 acres (66,000 ha), the size of the leasehold area was reduced by government resumptions. From that time, the size of the run was continually decreased. In 1908, the first subdivision of Jondaryan was carried out and in the 1920s further sales of land occurred. By the time Jondaryan Estates entered voluntary liquidation in 1946, 184 individual parcels of land of Jondaryan station had been sold to 220 different owners. William Kent junior, grandson of the founder of Jondaryan Estates, retained the homestead site, which comprised some 2,000 acres (810 ha) of land, but as a result of the subdivisions the woolshed site was in the hands of different owners. The homestead property remained in the possession of the Kent family until 1974.

== Description ==
The Jondaryan Homestead property is located on Evanslea Road, about 3.5 kilometres (2.2 mi) south-west of the township of Jondaryan, which is approximately 45 kilometres (28 mi) west of Toowoomba along the Warrego Highway. The property is partly bordered to the north by Oakey Creek. Significant structures of the Jondaryan Homestead Complex include a kitchen, butcher's shop, shearers' quarters, stables, dairy, toilet block and store. The present house was built after the original one was destroyed by fire in 1937. There are remnants on the site of a number of other structures, including horse stalls, a killing shed, hide store and Chinese gardener's glasshouse. There are also a number of gravestones on the property.

=== House ===
The present house is essentially rectangular in plan. Its sits low to the ground and has a hipped roof clad in corrugated iron. Its long facades are oriented east and west. The walls are clad in chamfer boards. A long verandah extending approximately three quarters of the length of the house opens to the east. Its edge is defined by square timber columns, between which are fitted canvas blinds and low timber benches. Two sets of casements windows open off this facade; one has four sashes, and the other three. All sashes have four lights. Three sets of French doors open onto the verandah, each door having five lights. There is a bank of awning windows on the western facade. Each column has three awning sashes in it. The covered walkway leading to the kitchen building connects to the house on this facade. To the north of this point are a series of large timber-framed double-hung sash windows.

=== Kitchen ===
The kitchen building, adjacent to the western side of the house, has a gable roof, with separate skillion roofs attached to one long and one short side. A further skillion verandah roof wraps around the remaining sides. This joins the covered walkway described above. All roofs are clad in corrugated, galvanised iron. The gable roof has timber finials at each end. A brick fireplace and chimneystack fits between the main gable-roofed core of the building and the area under the long skillion roof. The exterior walls are clad in weatherboards, while the interior ones are partly lined with horizontal, beaded, tongue-and-groove boards. The ceilings are lined to match the walls, and under the skillion roof, follow its slope. The floors are lined with shot-edge timber boards.

=== Butcher's Shop ===
The butcher's shop is located to the south-west of the house. It is rectangular in plan, has a gable roof and sits on low timber stumps. Surrounding this core structure on all sides is a skillion verandah roof, the supporting posts of which bear directly into the ground. A proportion of the walls of the core are made of horizontal slabs slotted into vertical posts, while the remainder is open timber framing. The gable ends are clad in rough-sawn weatherboards, and pierced by timber-bladed vent panels. The bargeboards and fascias to the gable roof are simply scalloped, and a timber finial is attached to one end. All roofs are clad in corrugated iron.

On the interior, the roof framing to both the gable and skillion roofs is exposed. A number of horizontal roof ties are in place. The edges of the corrugated iron cladding to the verandah roofs extend, for a short distance, inside the wall line. The interior space is divided by a number of partial walls made either of framing alone, timber doors, or horizontal slabs. The height of these walls matches the top-plate height of the exterior walls. The floor is lined with shot-edge timber boards.

=== Shearers' Quarters ===
The quarters for the shearers have a broken-backed, hipped roof clad in corrugated iron. Sitting on timber stumps, the building is adjacent to the north-eastern corner of the house. A chimneystack pierces the roof sheeting at a central point along the ridge. Some of the structure's walls are clad in weatherboards, while the remainder are made of corrugated iron insulated with charcoal (according to both the NTQ & AHC descriptions). Between timber columns with capitals, the balustrading to the verandah is made of timber frames in which wool bail straps are fitted diagonally.

=== Stables ===
The stable building is located south of the house. It forms a long, narrow rectangle in plan, and has a gable roof clad in corrugated iron. The gable ends are clad in weatherboards, while the remaining walls are made of vertical slabs fitted between timber posts, which are positioned at corners, openings, and other structural intervals. One short wall, below the gable weatherboards, is open. All timber appears to be hand-worked or split, except the northern end's bargeboards, which are simply carved. The other gable end has a timber-framed, fixed-glass window, with six lights. A number of wide timber doors open into the adjoining timber-fenced yard, above which are hinged timber-paling gates. A window opens from the opposite elevation, which also has a number of wide, doorless openings. The building sits directly on the ground. Inside the roof framing is exposed. The long space is divided by a slab wall at one end, and a number of timber stalls. Two gabled coach sheds are located adjacent to the open facade.

=== Dairy ===
In 1999, the dairy was covered in creepers, but its interior was still accessible via a side door. Located on the northern end of the kitchen, it has a pyramid roof, on the underside of which shingles are still visible. Corrugated iron may be the exterior roof cladding. Part of the floor is lined with shot-edge timber boards. The floor to the entrance area appears to be made of flagstones. The walls, some of which appear to be at an angle, are lined, both on the interior and exterior, with timber weatherboards. There are also a number of openings in the walls. There are remains of vents fitted into the ceiling and floor.

=== Toilet Block ===
The toilet block, located about 7 metres (23 ft) to the north of the kitchen, is a narrow rectangle in plan. Its roof is hipped and clad in corrugated iron. The fascias are simply scalloped timber. The building sits on low timber stumps and its interior can be accessed, on one long side, via a short flight of timber steps. On the other long side, the ground is essentially level with the floor of the building. The wall framing is exposed, and chamfer boards line the interior. There are a number of small timber-framed windows, one of which has a single awning sash. A concrete encased sewerage line attaches to one short end of the structure.

=== Chinese Gardener's Glasshouse ===
This small structure sits adjacent to the eastern end of the toilet block, in the vicinity of the northern elevation of the house. Its gable roof is clad in corrugated iron, and covered by a flowering vine. There is a timber board door in the eastern facade. On the northern and southern facades are a series of square glass panes in timber frames. The sill height for these windows is approximately 1.2 metres (3 ft 11 in) high. Below this level the walls are made concrete, in which the outlines of formwork are still visible. On the eastern and western building faces, the gable ends above this level are filled with painted brick. The timber bargeboards are also simply scalloped.

=== Store ===
The store is an L-shaped building, with gable roof projections clad in corrugated iron. It is located between the butcher's shop and stables, to the south of the house. The walls are clad in weatherboards. The building has a small number of doors and double-hung sash windows, all of which have six lights in each sash. Two small timber-slated vent panels are fitted into the gable end of the short wing of the structure. Two timber-board awning windows open out of one of the short wing's facades. The wall and roof framing is exposed on the interior. The floor is lined with shot-edge timber boards.

=== Horse Stalls ===
There are two horse stalls located next to one another. Each has a gable roof clad in corrugated iron. The gables are clad in hand-worked weatherboards, while the walls are made of vertical timber slabs fitted between timber posts.

=== Killing Shed ===
This structure consists of two gable-roofed components, the larger of which has the line of its ridge positioned perpendicular to the other. While the larger, steeply pitched roof is constructed to correspond to the general height of people, the secondary roof is set above this by almost a metre. The larger, lower roof is supported by four timber posts, but the smaller one is supported by only two. Between the timber posts are fitted a number of timber slab rails.

=== Grounds ===
The zone occupied by the house, kitchen and shearers' quarters has a number of established trees in it, including a tall palm. This area also has a tended lawn. A dirt roadway separates it from the butcher's shop, store and stables. Some fencing is visible to the north of the toilet block and "glasshouse".

== Heritage listing ==
Jondaryan Homestead was listed on the Queensland Heritage Register on 21 October 1992 having satisfied the following criteria.

The place is important in demonstrating the evolution or pattern of Queensland's history.

Jondaryan station was one of the earliest runs taken up in the Darling Downs region at the beginning of the 1840s.

The place is important in demonstrating the principal characteristics of a particular class of cultural places.

Despite the destruction of most of the original homestead by fire, a number of early buildings remain substantially intact on the Jondaryan site. These include a kitchen from the original homestead erected in 1844, and a butcher's shop and stables constructed during the early 1860s. They clearly demonstrate the operation of a large pastoral holding in Queensland from the earliest days of such activity in the area. The stables, horse stalls and killing shed are fine examples of slab construction from the early 1860s.

The place has a special association with the life or work of a particular person, group or organisation of importance in Queensland's history.

Jondaryan has a special association with the Kent family, who owned the homestead property for over 100 years. The family became sub-lessees in 1858, and co-owners of the property in 1863. The company the Kents helped found, Jondaryan Estates, of which the Jondaryan run was a significant component, developed into one of Queensland's largest pastoral companies.
