= Lockyer Hotel =

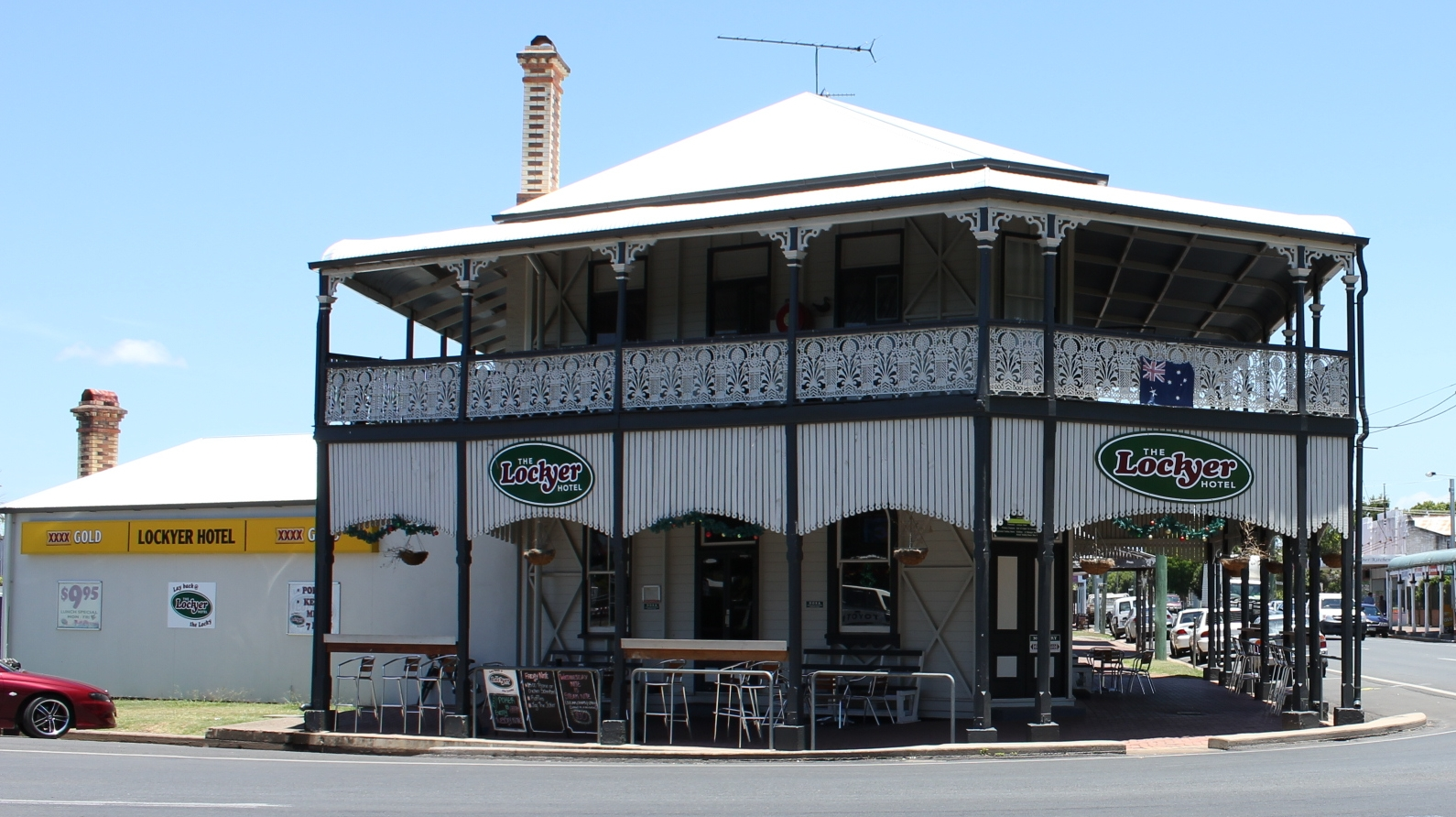
- Lockyer Hotel, Forest Hill, 2012

- Location within Queensland Location within Australia
- 27.5893°S 152.3572°E
- Location: Victoria Street, Forest Hill, Lockyer Valley Region, Queensland, Australia

History
- Design period: 1900–1914 (early 20th century)
- Built: 1906–1970s

Queensland Heritage Register
- Official name: Lockyer Hotel
- Type: state heritage (built)
- Designated: 21 October 1992
- Reference no.: 600650
- Significant period: 1900s (fabric); 1906–ongoing (historical use)
- Significant components: kitchen/kitchen house

Lockyer Hotel is a heritage-listed hotel at Victoria Street, Forest Hill, Lockyer Valley Region, Queensland, Australia. It was built from 1906 to 1970s. It was added to the Queensland Heritage Register on 21 October 1992.

== History ==
This two-storeyed timber hotel appears to have been built in 1906, for local Forest Hill farmer Alexander McAllister, who acquired the site in 1897. It was the town's third hotel, erected during the early 20th century growth of Forest Hill as a railhead and service centre, following closer agricultural settlement of the immediate area in the late 1890s and early 1900s.

From the 1840s to the 1880s, Forest Hill was part of the 20,000 acres (8,100 ha) Rosewood run, first taken up by DC McConnel in 1840, and later occupied by Kent & Wienholt, who worked the station in conjunction with their Jondaryan run. The Forest Hill land was heavily timbered, with some large gum swamps. The Ipswich to Toowoomba railway was surveyed between Laidley and Gatton in 1865, but a siding was not established in the Forest Hill area, about a mile and a half closer to Laidley than the present Forest Hill station, until c. 1881. Originally it was called Boyd's Siding, servicing the property of Mr AJ Boyd, about 4 miles (6.4 km) from the railway line. Boyd, the first agriculturalist in the area, planted an orchard and named his property Forest Hill, after which the siding was named in the early 1880s. This siding was shifted to the site of the present Forest Hill station c. 1887.

In 1886 and 1889, Kent & Wienholt cut up 3,500 acres (1,400 ha) south of the second Forest Hill siding into farm selections. This was the impetus for the establishment of an agricultural community at Forest Hill, but the township of Forest Hill did not emerge until the late 1890s, following the Queensland government's 1896 repurchase of 6,000 acres (2,400 ha) of the Rosewood freehold on the northern side of the Forest Hill railway station. This Rosewood Estate, comprising fertile black soil land, was cut into blocks of 70 to 125 acres (51 ha), and sold at prices from £3 to £5/5/0 per acre, repayable over 20 years. The sale was part of a government initiative to encourage agricultural settlement of the rich West Moreton lands, by opening for selection nearly all the country between Lowood and Gatton. A further 18,000 acres (7,300 ha) in the Lockyer Valley were cut up and sold as farms in 1903, and Forest Hill emerged as a thriving township. By 1908, Forest Hill was despatching more produce than either of the older settlements of Gatton and Laidley, and of this, about 70 percent came from the farms on the repurchased estates.

The Lockyer Hotel was erected during this growth period. In November 1906, Alex McAllister was granted a publican's licence, but this was transferred a month later to Frederick William Wilson, who had taken out an 8-year lease on the property in October 1906. In February 1907 the licence was transferred to Janet Meredith, previously the licensee of the Station Hotel (erected c. 1900) in Forest Hill. Mrs Meredith took over the lease of the Lockyer Hotel in 1907 and purchased the property in 1911. From late 1911 she leased it to a succession of publicans but retained ownership until her death in 1955. The Lockyer Hotel remained in the Meredith family until 1969. The rear annex, which includes the dining room, was erected in the late 1970s.

== Description ==
The Lockyer Hotel is prominently sited on the corner of Victoria and William Streets. It is a double-storeyed externally framed timber building, with generous verandahs overlooking the street, and a hipped corrugated galvanised iron roof. The building has a truncated entrance corner at the street intersection, and is abutted by an L-shaped single storeyed weatherboard annex to the east.

The hotel contains two bars on the ground floor, and accommodation upstairs. The principal bar, which is entered from the street corner, displays evidence of having once been two rooms, with an original timber archway and new post and beam replacing the wall. The bar has French doors and sliding sash windows, and arched sliding sash windows either side of the corner entrance. The entry vestibule to the upstairs accommodation to the south of the bar has a decorative arch above the foot of the timber stairs. The stairs have a carved balustrade, and a stained glass window at the half-landing.

The annex includes some fabric of the original outhouse kitchen, in particular the fireplace, chimney and stove, and windows which were once external.

The upstairs accommodation consists of small rooms flanking a central north-south running corridor. The walls are vertically-jointed timber, and all rooms have French doors opening onto a deep verandah.

The verandah has unpainted timber floors, iron lace-work balustrades, and is covered by a bull-nosed awning. The eastern verandah has been partially closed in. The verandah and awning are supported by chamfered posts with timber capitals resting on square concrete upstands; these posts are paired at the truncated corner. The exterior is further embellished with batten screens forming arches which run under the verandah. The battens have small decorative holes at their ends.

The external framing is mostly stud and nogging, with cross-bracing at the corners. The exterior of the building is intact and its distinctive character and position makes the Lockyer Hotel one of the most prominent buildings in the town.

== Heritage listing ==
Lockyer Hotel was listed on the Queensland Heritage Register on 21 October 1992 having satisfied the following criteria.

The place is important in demonstrating the evolution or pattern of Queensland's history.

The Lockyer Hotel, Forest Hill is important in demonstrating the evolution of Queensland's history, being evidence of the early 20th century development of Forest Hill as a focal point for the surrounding agricultural district.

The place is important in demonstrating the principal characteristics of a particular class of cultural places.

It is important in demonstrating the principal characteristics of a two-storeyed, early 20th century, single-skin timber hotel in rural Queensland.

The place is important because of its aesthetic significance.

As one of the most prominent and distinctive buildings in Forest Hill, the Lockyer Hotel makes an important aesthetic contribution to the character and townscape of the town, which is valued by the community.
