= Forest Hill railway station, Queensland =

Former railway station in Queensland, Australia

Forest Hill

General information
- Location: Railway Street, Forest Hill, Queensland
- Coordinates: 27°35′14″S 152°21′18″E
- Line: Main
- Connections: no connections

History
- Opened: 1881
- Closed: 1992

Services
Preceding station	Queensland Rail	Following station
Former service
Laidley towards Brisbane	Main Line railway	Lawes towards Toowoomba
Location

Forest Hill railway station is a closed railway station on the Main Line railway in Queensland, Australia. It served the town of Forest Hill in the Lockyer Valley Region.

== Description ==
The railway station originated as a siding to service the property of AJ Boyd beginning in 1880. The siding was initially called Boyd's Siding, but later changed its name to Forest Hill, the name of Boyd's property. Forest Hill was recorded as a railway station in 1881 and was moved one kilometer west to its present location in 1886. The importance of rail transport for shipping produce had significantly declined during the 1960s. The railway station closed on 31 July 1992.

A small, disused portion of the waiting building and station remain. Four large concrete grain silos to the west end of the station are used by occasional freight trains.
