= West Moreton =

- Region
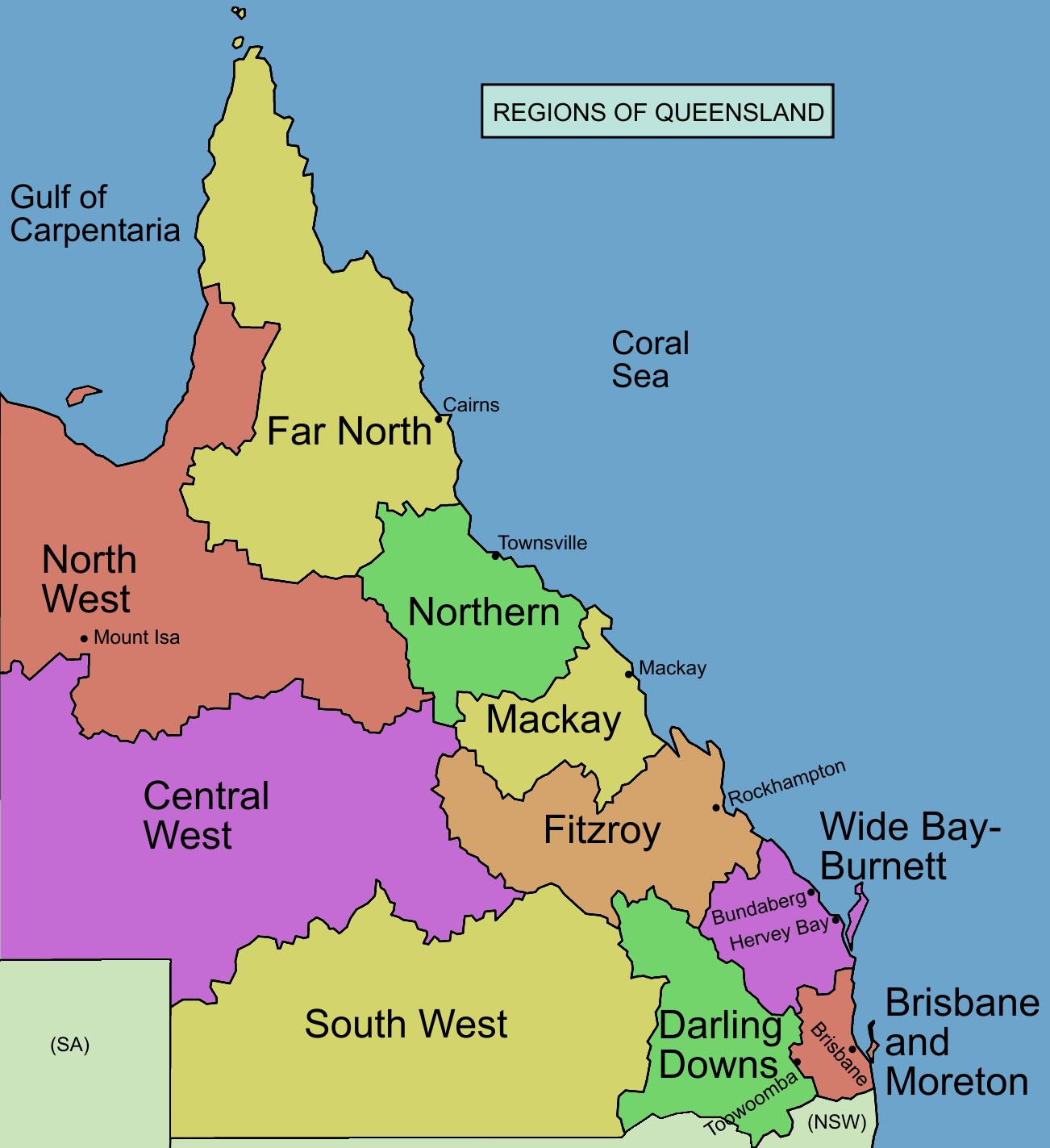
- Country: Australia
- State: Queensland

Government
  - State electorates: Lockyer; Scenic Rim; Ipswich West; Nanango
  - Federal divisions: Blair; Wright

Area
  - Total: 12,598.9 km^{2} (4,864.5 sq mi)

Population
  - Total: 109,430 (2010)
  - Density: 8.6857/km^{2} (22.4958/sq mi)
Regions around West Moreton
Wide Bay–Burnett	Wide Bay–Burnett	Sunshine Coast
Darling Downs	West Moreton	Brisbane; Gold Coast
Northern Tablelands (NSW)	Northern Rivers (NSW)	Northern Rivers (NSW)

West Moreton is a region of the Australian state of Queensland, consisting of the entire rural western portion of South East Queensland. It sits inland from both the Brisbane metropolitan area and the Gold Coast and to the east of the Darling Downs. Much of the region lies in the Great Dividing Range. The name appears in the names of many community organisations, West Moreton Health service area, and is used by the Australian Bureau of Statistics, although is not widely used otherwise due to the prevalence of South East Queensland in planning and other documents.

== Geography ==
The West Moreton region consists of the following local government areas. Some definitions, such as the Australian Standard Geographical Classification used by the Australian Bureau of Statistics, do not include the rural part of the City of Ipswich.

LGA	Population	Area
Lockyer Valley Region	38,609	2,272.3 km^{2} (877.3 sq mi)
Scenic Rim Region	40,072	4,254.5 km^{2} (1,642.7 sq mi)
Somerset Region	24,597	3,939.0 km^{2} (1,520.9 sq mi)
City of Ipswich (part)	52,119	689.5 km^{2} (266.2 sq mi)

== Major towns ==
- Beaudesert
- Boonah
- Esk
- Gatton
- Kilcoy
- Laidley
- Beechmont
- Coominya
- Fernvale
- Glenore Grove
- Grandchester
- Grantham
- Harrisville
- Helidon
- Kalbar
- Lake Wivenhoe
- Lowood
- Marburg
- Minden
- Peak Crossing
- Rathdowney
- Rosewood
- Tamrookum
- Tarampa
- Toogoolawah
- Warrill View
