= Blue Mountain Heights, Queensland =

Blue Mountain Heights
- Suburb
- Interactive map of Blue Mountain Heights
- Coordinates: 27.4975°S 151.9566°E
- Country: Australia
- State: Queensland
- City: Toowoomba
- LGA: Toowoomba Region
- Location: 7.2 km (4.5 mi) N of Toowoomba CBD; 135 km (84 mi) W of Brisbane

Government
  - State electorate: Toowoomba North
  - Federal division: Groom

Area
  - Total: 3.9 km^{2} (1.5 sq mi)

Population
  - Total: 988 (2021 census)
  - Density: 253/km^{2} (656/sq mi)
- Time zone: UTC+10:00 (AEST)
- Postcode: 4350
Suburbs around Blue Mountain Heights
Highfields	Highfields	Ballard
Birnam	Blue Mountain Heights	Ballard
Mount Kynoch	Ballard	Ballard

Blue Mountain Heights is a residential locality in the Toowoomba Region, Queensland, Australia. In the 2021 census, Blue Mountain Heights had a population of 988 people.

== Geography ==
Blue Mountain Heights is located 7 kilometres (4 mi) from the Toowoomba city centre via New England Highway. Plainland is in the Lockyer Valley, located 75 kilometres (47 mi) west of Brisbane, the state capital, along the Warrego Highway. Murphys Creek Road exits to the northeast.

== History ==
The locality was originally called Blue Mountain Estate, after the name of a local hotel.

== Demographics ==
In the 2006 census, Blue Mountain Heights had a population of 805 people. Residents had a median individual income of $585, compared with $448 for the Toowoomba statistical district, and a median family income of $1,559 compared to $1,116. The suburb had a SEIFA score of 1140, placing it ahead of all other suburbs except Redwood.

In the 2016 census, Blue Mountain Heights had a population of 929 people.

In the 2021 census, Blue Mountain Heights had a population of 988 people.

== Education ==
There are no schools in Blue Mountain Heights. The nearest government primary schools are Harlaxton State School in Harlaxton to the south and Highfields State School in neighbouring Highfields to the north. The nearest government secondary schools are Toowoomba State High School in Mount Lofty to the south-east and Highfields State Secondary College in Highfields.
