= Ballard, Queensland =

Ballard
- Suburb
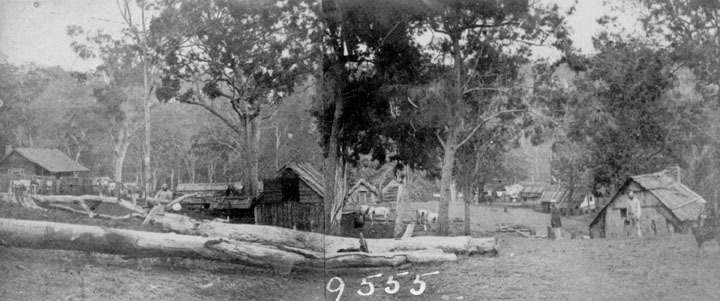
- Contractors Yard Ballards Camp during the construction of the Ipswich to Toowoomba Railway, 1865

- Interactive map of Ballard
- Coordinates: 27.4994°S 151.9805°E
- Country: Australia
- State: Queensland
- LGA: Lockyer Valley Region
- Location: 9.7 km (6.0 mi) NNE of Toowoomba CBD; 128 km (80 mi) W of Brisbane

Government
  - State electorate: Lockyer
  - Federal division: Wright

Area
  - Total: 16.8 km^{2} (6.5 sq mi)

Population
  - Total: 167 (2021 census)
  - Density: 9.94/km^{2} (25.75/sq mi)
- Time zone: UTC+10:00 (AEST)
- Postcode: 4352
Suburbs around Ballard
Highfields	Spring Bluff	Murphys Creek
Blue Mountain Heights	Ballard	Withcott
Mount Kynoch	Harlaxton	Mount Lofty

Ballard is a rural locality in the Lockyer Valley Region, Queensland, Australia. In the 2021 census, Ballard had a population of 167 people.

== Geography ==
Ballard is located 11 kilometres (7 mi) east from the Toowoomba city centre. Murphys Creek Road passes through the northwest corner.

== History ==
The locality, historically known as Ballaroo, is named for Robert Ballard, a railway engineer for Peto, Brassey and Betts who oversaw the construction of the main range section of the Ipswich–Toowoomba railway.

In December 1885, "The Highfields Estate" made up of 147 allotments was advertised for sale by Arthur Martin & Co. Despite the use of the Highfields name, the estate is not within present day Highfields but is predominantly within present day Ballard with small areas in Blue Mountain Heights and Murphys Creek. A map advertising the land sale illustrates the location of the estate in proximity to the "S & W Railway line" and the Highfields railway station (now known as Spring Bluff railway station) and shows town allotments in the area of the intersection of Valley View Road and Hanleys Road (27.4897°S 151.9682°E). The map describes the estate as the "Sanatorium and Garden of Queensland".

== Demographics ==
At the 2006 census, tBallard had a population of 355 people.

In the 2016 census, Ballard had a population of 151 people.

In the 2021 census, Ballard had a population of 167 people.

== Heritage listings ==
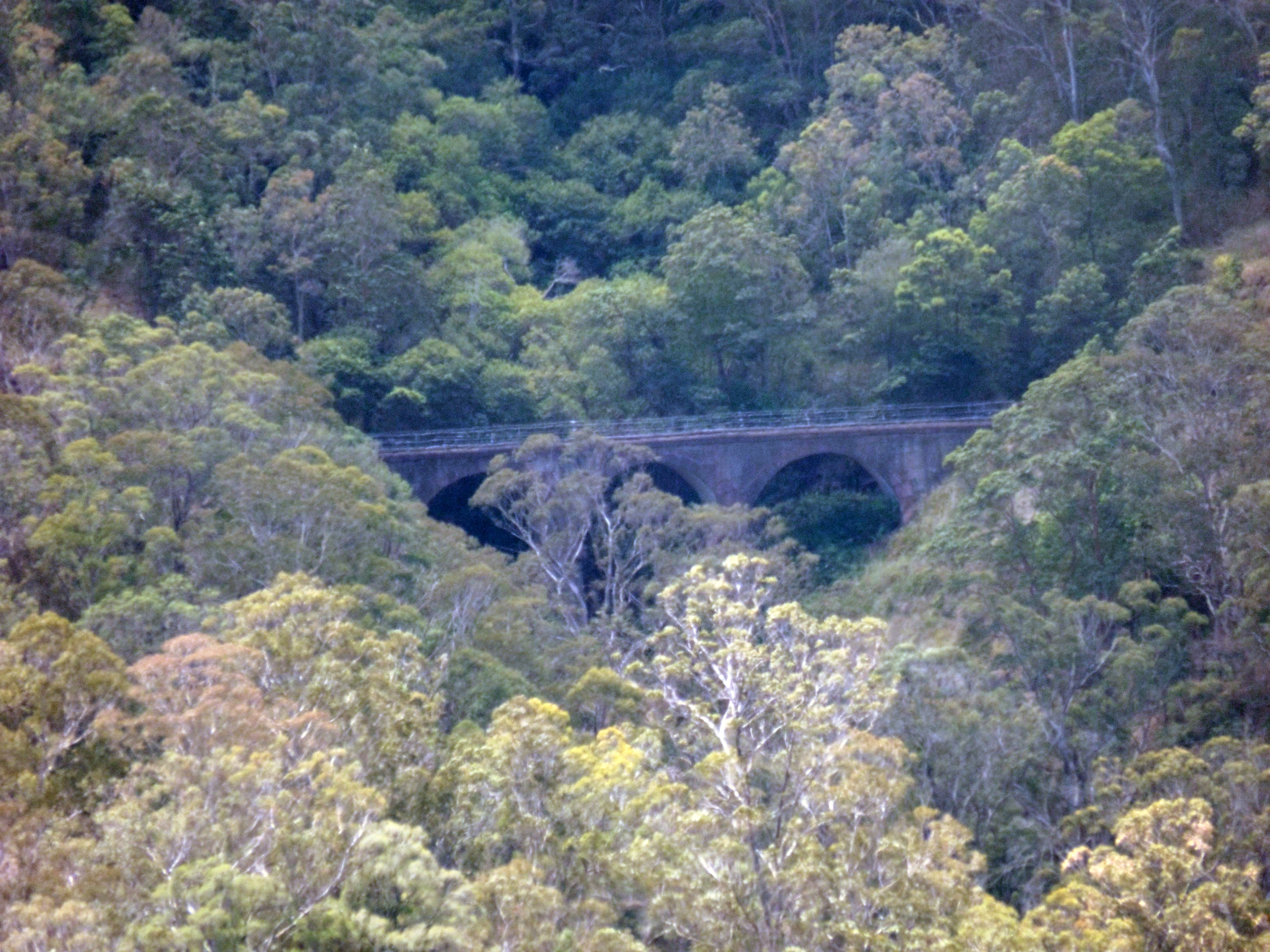
Swansons Rail Bridge, 2014

Ballard has a number of heritage-listed sites, including:

- 6 kilometres (3.7 mi) north of Toowoomba: Swansons Rail Bridge

== Education ==
There are no schools in Ballard. The nearest government primary schools are Harlaxton State School in neighbouring Harlaxton to the south, Withcott State School in neighbouring Withcott to the east, and Murphy's Creek State School in neighbouring Murphys Creek to the north-west. The nearest government secondary schools are Toowoomba State High School in neighbouring Mount Lofty to the south-east and Centenary Heights State High School in Centenary Heights to the south.
