= Murphys Creek, Queensland =

Murphys Creek
- Town
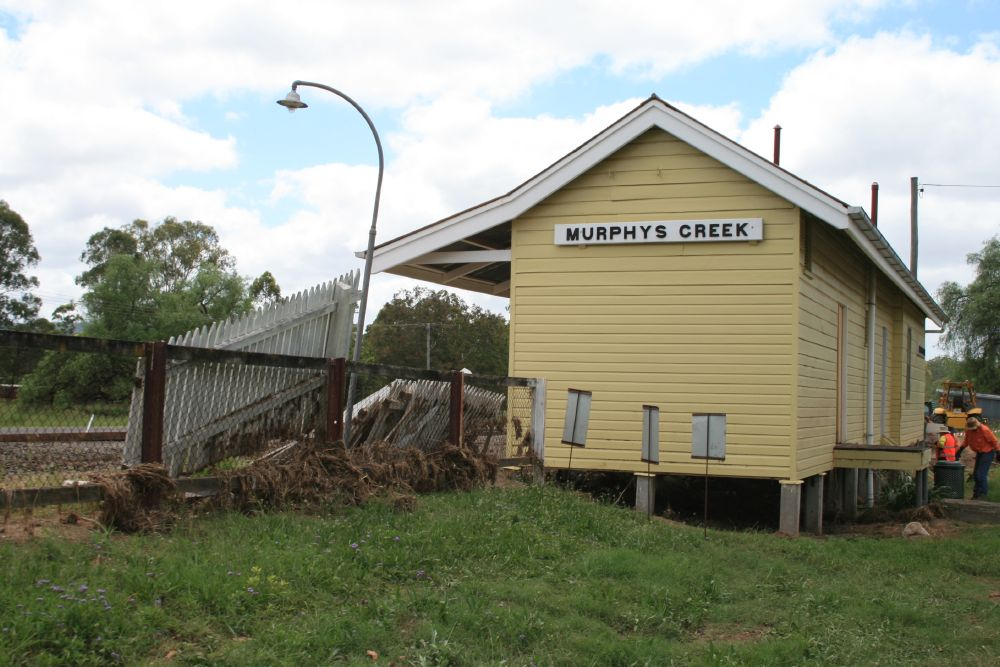
- Murphys Creek railway station, 2011

- Interactive map of Murphys Creek
- Coordinates: 27.4613°S 152.0561°E
- Country: Australia
- State: Queensland
- LGA: Lockyer Valley Region
- Location: 21.2 km (13.2 mi) NE of Toowoomba CBD; 36.2 km (22.5 mi) WNW of Gatton; 126 km (78 mi) W of Brisbane

Government
  - State electorate: Lockyer
  - Federal division: Wright

Area
  - Total: 48.1 km^{2} (18.6 sq mi)

Population
  - Total: 633 (2021 census)
  - Density: 13.160/km^{2} (34.08/sq mi)
- Time zone: UTC+10:00 (AEST)
- Postcode: 4352
- County: Churchill
- Parish: Taylor
Localities around Murphys Creek
Cabarlah	Fifteen Mile	Fifteen Mile
Spring Bluff	Murphys Creek	White Mountain
Ballard	Withcott	Lockyer; Upper Lockyer

Murphys Creek is a rural town and locality in the Lockyer Valley Region, Queensland, Australia. In the 2021 census, the locality of Murphys Creek had a population of 633 people.

== Geography ==
The locality is located at the foot of the Great Dividing Range. Murphys Creek Road passes through from west to southeast.

== History ==
The locality was originally known as Murphy's Waterhole and Fingal. Peter Murphy was a convict assigned as a servant to Patrick Leslie and accompanied Leslie on his 1841-42 exploration of the Darling Downs. Murphy was highly regarded by Leslie and arranged for the Governor of New South Wales to pardon Murphy.

Murphys Creek developed as a railway town on the line between the regional city of Toowoomba and settlements to the east, including Helidon, Ipswich and Brisbane. A railway station in the town was opened in 1867, as a part of the Ipswich-Toowoomba segment of the Southern and Western Railway. Based at the foot of the Great Dividing Range, the station and water tank were intended to provide water and services for steam locomotives about to embark on the difficult journey up the steep slopes of the Toowoomba range. The station was named for a creek that ran through the area, that was in turn named for a shepherd who had built a hut in the area around 1864. A correspondent for the Brisbane Courier newspaper around this time described the site as a "feeding place for the engines" travelling to and from Toowoomba.

Murphy's Creek Post Office opened on 18 May 1868 and closed in 1987.

Residents began to lobby for a school in June 1870. Murphy's Creek Provisional School opened on 3 October 1870. In January 1871 it was announced that a state school building and teacher's residence would be erected. The new school building was opened on 1 May 1871 and the school became Murphy's Creek State School.

A small town, originally named Fingal, quickly sprang up around the station. The township had grown such an extent that by 1877 tenders had been called for the construction of a booking office and passenger platform at the station. These improvements were completed by 1878. However, in 1887 a fire at the station destroyed the lamp room and ladies' waiting room. In 1917 the station ceased to be used as a watering station for trains travelling up the range, with watering stations being provided elsewhere on the line (although a 40,000 litre emergency water tank was constructed at the station in 1921 for emergency purposes).

On the morning of 29 January 1913 a livestock train departed from Toowoomba and derailed near the Murphy’s Creek railway station, about one mile from the station yard limits. No members of the crew were injured, but many hundreds of cattle were killed and a considerable amount of damage was caused to the vehicles and the track. In response a breakdown train was sent to the scene of the disaster to clear the line for traffic. The area where the derailment had taken place was relatively inaccessible and workers had to prise the wreckage apart. Tragically, the next day a relief train from Toowoomba ran into the men working on the breakdown, with the result that six men were killed and several were seriously injured.

The township was officially renamed from Fingal to Murphys Creek on 17 January 1924.

The need to maintain the Murphys Creek railway station diminished in the second half of the 20th century with the introduction of the diesel-electric locomotive. These new trains were capable of climbing the steep slopes west of Murphys Creek without the requirement for attached locomotives. Steam operations had ceased completely on the line by the mid 1960s, and the station was finally closed in 1992, with the installation of computerised signalling systems removing the last justification for the continued existence of the station. The station buildings were sold to the local progress association in 1993, and the water tank was reassigned to be used as emergency water storage for the township, as well as for use watering the occasional steam heritage trains that periodically ran from Brisbane to Toowoomba.

A man and his six-year-old daughter died and many buildings in the town were damaged during the 2010–11 Queensland floods when flash flooding affected the area on 10 January 2011.

== Demographics ==
In the 2011 census, the locality of Murphys Creek had a population of 664 people, living in 150 occupied dwellings. The median age of the population was 38 years, all of whom reported speaking English primarily at home. 65% of the population of the town were born in Australia, 4.2% in England, 1.3% in Zimbabwe, with the remainder being born in New Zealand, the Philippines or the United States of America.

In the 2016 census, the locality of Murphys Creek had a population of 629 people.

In the 2021 census, the locality of Murphys Creek had a population of 633 people.

== Heritage listings ==
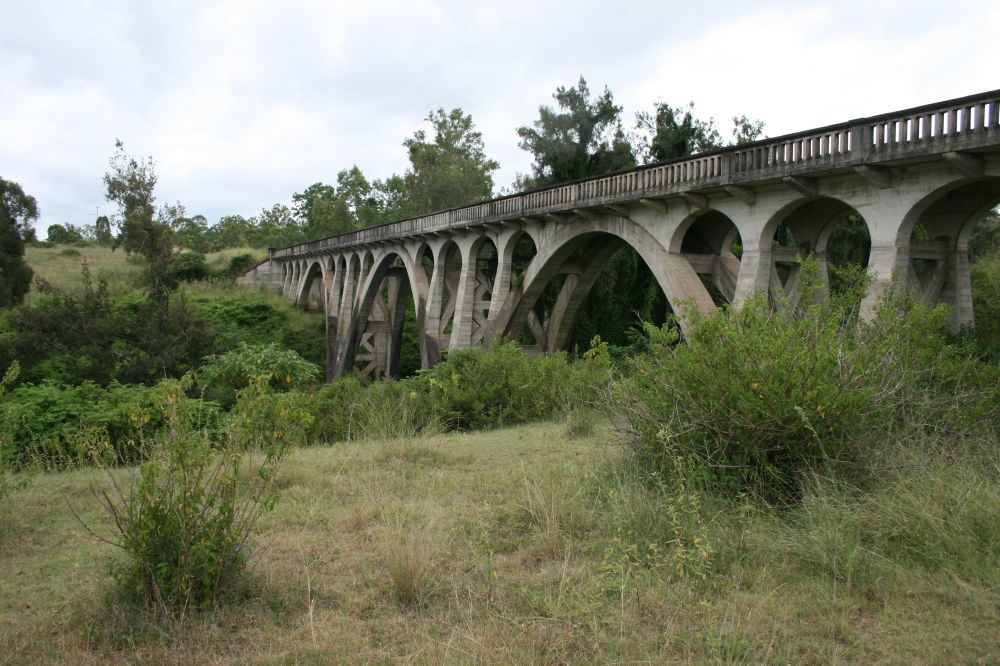
Lockyer Creek Railway Bridge from the south-west, 2009

Murphys Creek has a number of heritage-listed sites, including:

- Murphys Creek Railway Complex, Odin Street
- Main Range Railway, Railway Corridor from the end of Murphy's Creek Station to Ruthven Street overbridge, Harlaxton
- Lockyer Creek Railway Bridge, Toowoomba–Helidon railway line

== Education ==
Murphy's Creek State School is a government primary (Prep–6) school for boys and girls at 49 Murphys Creek School Road (27.4588°S 152.0513°E). In 2025, the school had an enrolment of 17 students.

There are no secondary schools in Murphys Creek. The nearest government secondary schools are Toowoomba State High School in Mount Lofty to the south-east, Centenary Heights State High School in Centenary Heights to the south-east, and Highfields State Secondary College in Highfields to the west.

There are also numerous non-government primary and secondary schools in Toowoomba and its suburbs.
