= Main Range Railway =

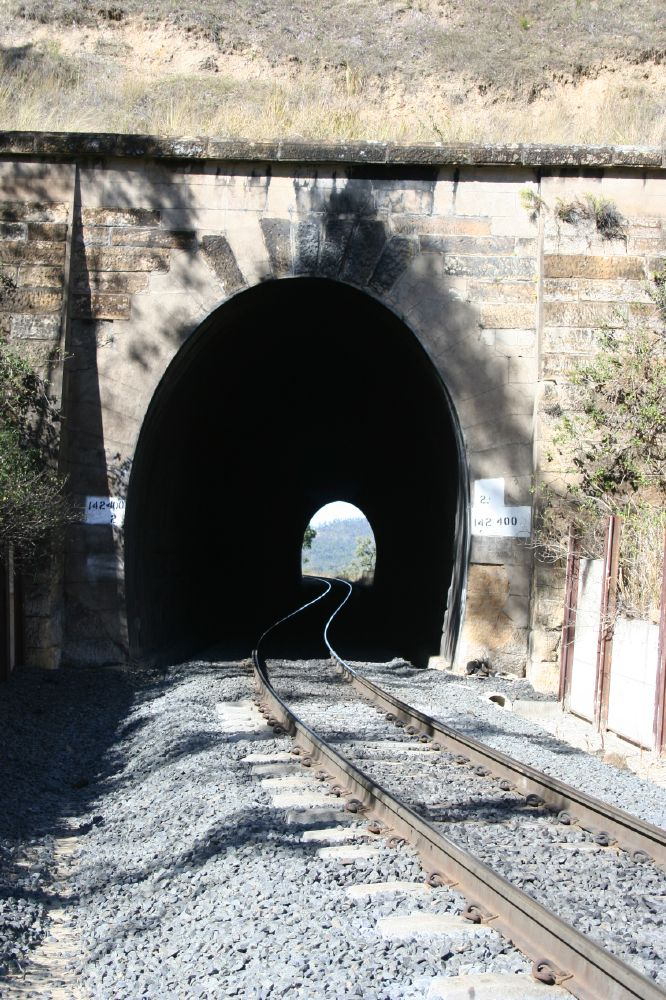
- Tunnel #2 down, Main Range Railway, 2008

- Location within Queensland Location within Australia
- 27.4892°S 152.0063°E
- Location: Railway Corridor from the end of Murphy's Creek Station to Ruthven Street overbridge, Harlaxton, Murphys Creek, Queensland, Australia

History
- Design period: 1840s–1860s (mid-19th century)
- Built: 1865–1867

Queensland Heritage Register
- Official name: Main Range Railway
- Type: state heritage (built)
- Designated: 5 February 2009
- Reference no.: 601480
- Significant period: 1865–1867 establishment period
- Significant components: views from, railway station, pavilion, embankment – railway, quarry, shed – storage, waiting room, formation – railway, building foundations/ruins, trees/plantings, platform, wall/s – retaining, culvert – railway, residential accommodation – workers' housing, abutments – railway bridge, railway, bridge/viaduct – railway, signal box/signal cabin/switch house/mechanical points (rail), garden/grounds, tunnel – railway, signals, cutting – railway, drainage, machinery/plant/equipment – transport – rail
- Builders: Peto, Brassey and Betts

Main Range Railway is a heritage-listed railway from the end of Murphys Creek railway station, Murphys Creek to the Ruthven Street overbridge, Harlaxton, Queensland, Australia. It forms part of the Main Line railway and was built from 1865 to 1867 by railway builders Peto, Brassey and Betts. It was added to the Queensland Heritage Register on 5 February 2009.

== History ==
The Main Range Railway, between Murphys Creek and Harlaxton on the outskirts of Toowoomba, was built in 1865–1867 by railway builders Peto, Brassey and Betts, for the colonial Government of Queensland.

The Main Range, part of Australia's Great Dividing Range, was a formidable geological barrier to trade following pastoral settlement on the Darling Downs in the 1840s. An adequate transport link between the sheep stations of the Darling Downs and the ports of Brisbane and Ipswich became increasingly important to enable the export of wool and the import of station supplies. A number of dray routes were used, with varying degrees of difficulty, to move goods and people across the Main Range during the 1840s. From 1847 Spicer's Gap replaced Cunningham's Gap (1828) as the preferred route in the southern Downs region. On the northern end of the Downs, Gorman's Gap was used from 1840, followed by Hodgson's Gap in 1842.

In 1855 the Toll Bar Road was opened and the traffic that soon came to use this route facilitated the expansion of the settlement of "The Swamp", from 1857 officially known as Toowoomba. By the early 1860s Toowoomba was the principal settlement on the Darling Downs, supplanting nearby Drayton as the service centre for the surrounding district. In this period, the pastoralists of the Darling Downs wielded significant political and economic power in the young colony of Queensland. This influenced the decision to initiate Queensland's railway network from Ipswich, considered the port for the Darling Downs, rather than Brisbane.

Queensland's earliest endeavours toward constructing a railway were through the activities of the Moreton Bay Tramway Company. The company intended to construct a tramway with horses hauling vehicles on timber rails, surveying a route between Ipswich and Toowoomba in 1861. The company failed to raise sufficient capital for the project to succeed and by the end of 1862 was insolvent.

Thereafter, the Queensland Government took responsibility for building the colony's railways. The first Railway Bill, authorising the government to construct and borrow funds for this purpose was passed on 3 September 1863. In the lead up to the Bill, Irish civil engineer Abraham Fitzgibbon, estimating comparative construction costs of rail gauges between Ipswich and Toowoomba, recommended to the government the adoption of a light railway with a 3 ft 6 in narrow gauge (1,067 millimetres (42.0 in)). The ascent of the Main Range was the principal engineering and expense obstacle for the railway to Toowoomba and a narrow gauge allowed for tighter rail curves on the Range incline. A lighter railway with extensive use of curved track meant cheaper construction costs, lessening capital outlay. After much debate, the Queensland government adopted Fitzgibbon's proposal. While contemporary examples of shorter narrow gauge railways existed in other parts of the world, none were of the length or scale proposed for Queensland. The railway between Ipswich and Toowoomba was the first use of a narrow gauge for a main line.

Shortly after the bill was passed, Fitzgibbon was contracted as chief engineer, responsible for surveying the line, providing specifications and construction supervision. On 23 December 1863 he was appointed as Queensland's first Commissioner of Railways, a post held until October 1864. Sir Charles Fox was appointed consulting engineer, responsible for selecting the various components such as trains, rails and bridges to facilitate the railway. Samuel Willcox was responsible for the workforce involved in constructing the line.

The construction of the line between Ipswich and Toowoomba was divided into five sections. Section 1 was from Ipswich to Grandchester and opened on 31 July 1865. Tenders were called for Sections 2, 3, 4 and 5 on 24 August 1864 to extend the line from Grandchester to Toowoomba. Messrs Peto, Brassey and Betts, contractors with extensive worldwide experience in railway construction and builders of Section 1, were awarded the contract on 27 February 1865 for a sum of £515,000.

Section 5, the ascent of the Main Range from Murphy's Creek to Toowoomba was the most difficult section to engineer, involving steep gradients of 1 in 50, nine tunnels, 47 bridges, 126 curves, numerous cuttings, embankments, culverts and nearly 18 miles (29 km) of track work. Extensive use of 5 chains (330 ft; 100 m) radius rail was necessary to negotiate the ascent. Nearly two thirds of the line required cutting, approximately one quarter embankments and the remainder tunnelling and bridging, over a rise close to 1,200 feet (370 m). Section 5 was engineered in two separate stages, delineated by the current site of Spring Bluff railway station. The incline from this point towards Toowoomba provided the most engineering challenges within Section 5, with work including five tunnels and three major bridges.

The immense scale of the Main Range Railway demanded large numbers of skilled and unskilled workers to complete the project. The Queensland Government's immigration agent advertised in Great Britain and Germany for railway workers, offering free passage on the Black Ball shipping line to artisans such as excavators, bridge carpenters, masons and bricklayers. During April 1866 a total of 1009 workmen were employed along Section 5.

Peto, Brassey and Betts contracted work for specified lengths of line or engineering features to agents, who were responsible for ensuring contracts were adhered to and who in turn employed gangs of workers. Peto, Brassey and Betts also appointed an Engineer-In-Charge, Robert Ballard, to oversee construction on the Main Range. Prior to working on the Main Range, Ballard had gained experience in tunnel construction in New South Wales and his expertise in challenging engineering work, especially tunnelling, determined his appointment. Ballard's high standard of work on Section 5 (the Main Range Railway), in comparison with other sections of the Ipswich to Toowoomba line, was noted in reports soon after its completion and was considered the least expensive section of the Ipswich-Toowoomba railway to maintain. The high standard of his work on the Main Range Railway later earned him appointments as Superintending Engineer on Queensland's Great Northern Railway (later known as Central Western railway) in 1872 and as Chief Engineer for the Central and Northern railways (1882). He was granted £5,000 in the 1880s by the Queensland Government for his achievements in cost-effective railway construction.

With the large amount of cutting and tunnelling required, much of the labour force was engaged in heavy manual labour to remove earth. While explosives were used to blast through rock, the work relied on large teams of men excavating with pick and shovel, assisted by horse and bullock teams to move earth, which was then used to create embankments. Such work in difficult terrain carried with it a high degree of risk and a number of work-related injuries and deaths occurred along the line during construction.

Tunnels were constructed where the terrain was too difficult to create cuttings. Two were ready for brick lining on 1 November 1865, one on 1 January 1866 and another on 13 Feb 1866. By April 1866 three quarters of the tunnelling had been excavated and work had begun on lining the tunnels. Within the tunnels, curved and straight rail, or a combination of both were laid. In addition to its two portals, tunnel 8 was constructed with the aid of a side gallery to allow boring to proceed on four faces. The side gallery is the only example of a side gallery on a railway tunnel thought to exist in Australia.

The tunnels built for the Main Range Railway are among Australia's earliest. In Queensland the only tunnels predating those of the Main Range are the two (Victoria Tunnel and the Six Chain Tunnel), built through the Little Liverpool Range in Section 2 of the main line opening 1 June 1866 (and still in use). The first railway tunnels were built in Victoria on the double line between Melbourne and Bendigo, opening in 1862 (still in use). New South Wales' first tunnel, initially supervised by Ballard, was the Redbank Range Tunnel at Picton which opened in early 1867 (since closed).

A large quarry now known as Cliffdale was established roughly halfway up the Main Range during construction, to supply ballast for the line. In later years the quarry was furnished with its own siding (since removed) and loading area, with stone extracted from the site into the 1950s.

The navvies (construction workers) and contractors resided in a number of camps along the course of the railway. From the base of the range upwards, camps included Gibbon's, Fountain's, Holmes', Main Range, Ballard's and Cameron's, generally named after the person responsible for the section of line in a particular area. The camps operated as temporary townships and bases for specific engineering projects. Bricks were being manufactured at Ballard's camp by August 1865. Peto, Brassey and Betts supplied a prefabricated church at Ballard's and buildings were supplied for community use at other camps. Fountain's, Holmes' and Ballard's camps were the most substantial, with Ballard's working population reported at about 500 in mid-1865.

Stores such as butchers and bakers were established and fresh produce was sourced from Toowoomba and Ipswich. Numerous drinking houses, legal and otherwise, provided workers with alcohol, meals and entertainment. Although many workers were single men, around one third were accompanied by their families. The makeshift nature of the camps led to inadequate sanitation with typhoid and diphtheria causing the death of a number of infants and young children in 1866 and 1867. One murder at Holmes camp and a small number of accidental deaths at campsites also occurred. Some 22 deaths (mainly infants) were recorded at Main Range camp.

The construction of the Main Range Railway took just over two years to complete. It was one of the most important early public works undertaken in Queensland and a major government investment in infrastructure. The first train to cross the Range made its entry into Toowoomba on 12 April 1867; the official opening of the line took place on 30 April 1867.

The railway soon became the dominant transport artery for the movement of goods and people between Toowoomba and Ipswich. From Toowoomba the Western railway line extended to Dalby in 1868 while the Southern railway line reached Warwick by 1871. Numerous visitors to the Darling Downs in the late nineteenth and early twentieth centuries marvelled at the engineering and scenic qualities of the Main Range Railway. Until road transportation began to dominate in the twentieth century, the railway was intrinsically associated with the development of pastoral, agricultural and mining industries, closer settlement and the growth of townships on the Darling Downs and south western Queensland.

The Main Range Railway was one of the most challenging sections of line for enginemen during the steam era on the Queensland Railways. Despite the advent of more powerful locomotives during the nineteenth and twentieth centuries, the combination of sharp curves, steep grades and tunnels created difficult conditions for crews. Railway workers needed to ensure adequate supplies of coal and water to negotiate the crossing and banking engines were employed between Murphy's Creek and Toowoomba to assist ascending trains. On curved sections of track inner check rails were laid to minimise the possibility of derailment after 1897. Sandboxes were placed along the line to assist wheel traction. Despite being a difficult stretch of railway to work, the Main Range line has been relatively free of major disasters. Of the fatal incidents that have occurred, the worst was the Murphy's Creek collision (1913) when six men were killed.

Since its opening in 1867 the Main Range line has sustained a high level of usage with various maintenance and upgrading works ensuring its continuity as a vital transport link. By 1868 excessive wear from steep grades and sharp curves was reported and some sections of iron rail were replaced with steel. From 1875 all curves sharper than 10 chains (660 ft; 200 m) radius were re-laid with steel. In 1879 a proposal by Chief Engineer Henry Charles Stanley to re-lay track on the Main Range, to enable the use of heavier engines and to reduce maintenance was approved, with the work completed by 1883.

In 1882 plans for a plate girder overbridge were drawn up for the Ruthven Street overbridge, at the range summit near Harlaxton. The plate girder replaced an earlier timber structure but the existing brick abutments were retained. Only a small number of railway bridges with brick abutments were ever built in Queensland. A report of the Main Range Railway line in March 1867 included a description of the brick abutments and stone facings of the overbridge on the road to Highfields. As other surviving examples post-date the construction of the Main Range Railway, the brick abutments are thought to be the oldest in Queensland.

Between 1899 and 1902 the track was strengthened to support 12 long tons (12 t) axle loads and realigned to eliminate curves below a five chain radius, while the inadequate original iron girder bridges on timber piers were replaced with embankments and culverts. During this period Swansons Rail Bridge was constructed close to the summit of the range; it is notable as the first concrete arched rail bridge constructed in Australia. From the latter half of the 1990s to 2006, eleven timber bridges were replaced with steel or concrete drains. Other than the Swanson and Harlaxton bridges, only two remain: King's Bridge (timber) and Murphy's Creek Bridge (steel and concrete).

Over time, different materials including brick, stone and concrete have been used to stabilise cuttings, embankments and entrances to tunnels. Many of the culvert portals were replaced and sides of shallow cuttings removed on the south side of the track when an access road running parallel to the line was built between 1993 and 1996. More recently timber sleepers have been progressively replaced by concrete sleepers.

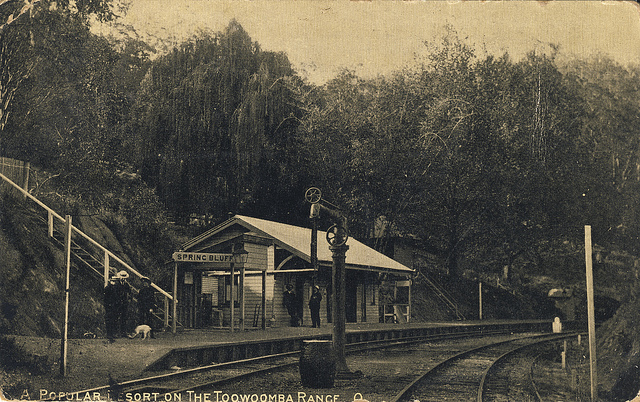
Spring Bluff railway station, 1907

After the opening of the line, a number of stations and sidings were established along the route between Murphy's Creek and Toowoomba stations. Stations were located at Murphy's Creek (1867), Holmes, known as 87 Mile siding until 1912, Ballard, in use by 1876, Rangeview, a public station by 1949, and Harlaxton (1884). Sidings included Cliffdale (by 1912), 88 and 95 Mile (1916) and Calobra, Commonwealth and Magoon (1942). While most of the components of these places are gone, Spring Bluff railway station (known as Highfields until 1890) survives as an example of the small railway settlements that used to exist on the range. Situated approximately halfway up the Main Range, equipped with a natural spring for watering and a level section of track, Spring Bluff has always been the principal halt between Murphy's Creek and Toowoomba and the only station equipped with a resident station master. Spring Bluff was utilised locally by nearby settlers and the Highfields sawmill.

By 1879, Spring Bluff station included a 7000-gallon gravity-fed supply of water, passenger station and office, porter's cottage and station master's residence. The existing station and night officer's quarters are thought to date from the 1880s. The crossing loop was extended in 1911 and 1959, with its current configuration dating from 1968. By 1963 the complex also included a signal cabin, single men's quarters (now removed), fettler's quarters, and loading bank. The station building contains two electric staff machines that demonstrate the safe management of multiple trains using the main range. No train driver was able to proceed between stations up or down the range without the issue of a staff. In 1992, Spring Bluff Station was decommissioned and Centralised Traffic Control (CTC) was installed.

From the early 1900s the picturesque surrounds of Spring Bluff became a popular local destination for recreation and leisure, with an entertainment shed provided on a rise behind the station between 1907 and 1911. In addition to recreation and leisure, Spring Bluff was and remains well known for its floral displays and gardens. Early evidence of efforts to beautify the surrounds exist in the sole remaining London plane (Platanus × hispanica) tree, one of five planted in 1870. From the 1910s, Queensland Railways began promoting the beautification of stations and growing of vegetables by station staff, with competitions held for the best displays. During the 1930s and 1940s Station Master Ralph Kirsop, his wife Lillian and night officers undertook extensive improvements to the gardens, creating flower beds terraced with blue metal stone. Spring Bluff Station was awarded prizes numerous times for its floral displays and produce.

After a period of post-war neglect, resident railway workers from the 1960s were required to assist in the upkeep of the gardens. Since this time the gardens have continued to be cultivated, offering alternating floral displays in summer and spring. In the 1970s Queensland Rail began excursions from Toowoomba to Spring Bluff and these trips continue to operate during Toowoomba's Carnival of Flowers in September. During the last quarter of the twentieth century, Queensland Railways continued to improve visitor amenities at Spring Bluff. Work included extending the grassed area below the pavilion, addition of a cricket pitch, planting of native and exotic vegetation and lawn grasses, construction of bitumen pathways and installation of an ex-Guard's Van to serve refreshments. Since 1995 the Spring Bluff Railway Station Trust Management Committee, composed of representatives from local councils and Queensland Rail, has been responsible for the management of the site. Lion's Club members have also contributed to the upkeep of the grounds and gardens. The Spring Bluff railway complex remains a well-patronised tourist attraction.

In the 1860s, the ambitious construction of the Main Range Railway provided the colony of Queensland a critical transport link for the export of goods from its interior. This role currently continues, with most of the traffic on the Main Range Railway laden with coal for overseas markets.

== Description ==
=== Main Range Railway Overview ===
From Murphy's Creek Station, the railway begins its winding ascent up the Main Range, reaching the summit at Harlaxton before descending gently to Toowoomba Station. The line follows the contours of spurs and ridges, with the railway typically set in along ascending hillsides and banks that sit to the north of the track. Responding to the terrain, numerous built features including tunnels, cuttings, culverts, bridges, embankments and stabilizing works occur along the extent of the railway. Constantly changing and frequently spectacular vistas of steep timbered hills, gullies and distant ranges extend south east to the coastal plain.

The heritage boundary begins from the western side of the Murphy's Creek railway crossing, continuing within the boundary of the railway corridor as it ascends the Range, terminating on the summit at the Ruthven Street overbridge at Harlaxton.

The following descriptions relate to features inspected on two site visits. Other features not inspected are likely to exist along the railway. All descriptions are arranged according to type and in order of occurrence as the line ascends from Murphy's Creek. Locations included refer to the distance from Roma Street Station, as used by Queensland Rail. The extent of the 1860s railway campsites has not been determined.

=== Tunnels ===
Nine tunnels occur along the Main Range Railway, bore through hillsides of varying height. Each tunnel differs in length and all feature elliptical portals and interiors lined with stone and brick. Directly outside the portals are steep cuttings that include retaining features of regular and rubble coursed stone walls.

Tunnel 1 is located at 142.07 kilometres (88.28 mi). The tunnel is straight with a length close to 65 metres (213 ft). The spandrels of the tunnel portals are infilled with regular coursed quarry faced sandstone, crowned by a deck and projecting cornice. The segments forming the arch on the entry portal are of rendered stone. Set into the hill above the cornice is a section of stone retaining wall. The exit portal arch segments are of quarry-faced stone. Internally, the arched ceiling of the tunnel is lined with bricks, meeting with a lining of smooth-faced stone. A coarsely dressed stone wall extends to the base of the tunnel.

Tunnel 2 is located at 142.4 kilometres (88.5 mi). The tunnel is straight with a length close to 80 metres (260 ft). The spandrels of the tunnel portals are infilled with regular coursed quarry-faced sandstone, crowned by a deck and projecting cornice. Sandstone segments form the arched entrance and small rendered side walls face the entrance. Internally, the arched ceiling of the tunnel is lined with bricks, meeting with a wall lining of smooth-faced stone. A coarsely dressed stone wall extends to the base of the tunnel. Concrete retaining walls supported by steel posts are located outside both portal entrances.

Tunnel 3 is located at 144.5 kilometres (89.8 mi). The tunnel is curved with a length close to 62 metres (203 ft). The spandrels of the tunnel portals are infilled with regular coursed quarry-faced sandstone, crowned by a deck and projecting cornice. Sandstone segments form the arched entrance of the tunnel. Internally, the arched ceiling of the tunnel is lined with bricks, meeting with a lining of smooth-faced stone. Exposed sections of the ceiling reveal a second lining of brick. A coarsely dressed stone wall extends to the base of the tunnel. The entrances to Tunnel 3 are marked by steep rock cuttings with extensive pick-facing and sections of stone retaining wall.

Tunnel 4 is located at 147.25 kilometres (91.50 mi). The tunnel contains straight and curved line with a length close to 161 metres (528 ft). The spandrels of the tunnel portals are infilled with regular coursed quarry-faced sandstone crowned by a deck and projecting cornice. Sandstone segments form the arched entrance of the tunnel. Internally, the arched ceiling of the tunnel immediately inside the entrance is lined with smooth-faced stone. Brick lining may occur further inside the tunnel. From mid-height a coarsely dressed stone wall extends to the base of the tunnel.

Tunnel 5 is located at 151.05 kilometres (93.86 mi). The tunnel is curved with a length close to 92 metres (302 ft). The spandrels of the tunnel portals are infilled with regular coursed quarry-faced sandstone crowned by a deck and projecting cornice. Sandstone segments form the arched entrance of the tunnel. Internally, the arched ceiling of the tunnel is lined with bricks. From mid-height a coarsely dressed stone wall extends to the base of the tunnel.

Tunnel 6 is located at 151.89 kilometres (94.38 mi). The tunnel is curved with a length close to 87 metres (285 ft). The spandrels of the tunnel portals are infilled with regular coursed quarry-faced sandstone crowned by a deck and projecting cornice. Sandstone segments form the arched entrance of the tunnel. Internally, the arched ceiling of the tunnel is lined with bricks. From mid-height a coarsely dressed stone wall extends to the base of the tunnel.

Tunnel 7 is located at 152.64 kilometres (94.85 mi). The tunnel contains straight and curved line with a length close to 59 metres (194 ft). The spandrels of the tunnel portals are infilled with regular coursed quarry-faced sandstone crowned by a deck and projecting cornice. Sandstone segments form the arched entrance of the tunnel. The exit portal deck and cornice is stepped. Internally, the arched ceiling of the tunnel is lined with smooth-faced stone. From mid-height a coarsely dressed stone wall extends to the base of the tunnel.

Tunnel 8 is located at 152.8 kilometres (94.9 mi). The tunnel contains straight and curved line with a length close to 153 metres (502 ft). The spandrels of the tunnel portals are infilled with regular coursed quarry-faced sandstone. Sandstone segments form the arched entrance of the tunnel. The entrance portal is crowned by a stepped deck with missing sections of cornicing. The exit portal has a straight deck and cornice. Internally, the arched ceiling of the tunnel is lined in different sections with brick and smooth-faced stone. From mid-height a coarsely dressed stone wall extends to the base of the tunnel. A side gallery, approximately presently obscured by vegetation, is set high into the hillside above the access road that skirts the hill containing the tunnel. The tunnel is approximately 10 metres (33 ft) in length, 2.5 metres (8 ft 2 in) wide and 2.6 metres (8 ft 6 in) high. The tunnel is unlined but its connection with the railway tunnel is arched.

Tunnel 9 is located at 153.85 kilometres (95.60 mi). The tunnel is straight with a length close to 127 metres (417 ft). The spandrels of the tunnel portals are infilled with regular coursed quarry-faced sandstone crowned by a deck and projecting cornice. Sandstone segments form the arched entrance of the tunnel. Internally, the arched ceiling of the tunnel is lined with smooth-faced stone. From mid-height a coarsely dressed stone wall extends to the base of the tunnel.

=== Culverts ===
Culverts and drains occur frequently along the Main Range Railway. At varying depths beneath the rail, they direct water from the north side of the track, passing under the length of the railway and parallel access road and drain to the south east. The culverts and drains vary greatly in size shape and composition. Materials for culverts and drains include cut stone, mortared rocks, brick, concrete and corrugated iron piping. The following descriptions are of entrances situated on the north side of the track.

Located at 135.28 kilometres (84.06 mi) is a brick culvert. The culvert is arched, with brick wing walls and stone decking and abutments. Internally the arch of the culvert is lined with bricks of varying colour, coated in scale.

Located at 137.32 kilometres (85.33 mi) is a brick culvert. The culvert is arched, with brick wing walls and stone deck and abutments. Internally the arch and floor of the causeway are lined with bricks, coated in scale.

Located between culverts at 137.32 kilometres (85.33 mi) and 137.8 kilometres (85.6 mi) is a brick culvert. The culvert is arched, with brick wing walls and stone deck and abutments. Internally, the arch and floor of the causeway are lined with bricks, coated in scale.

Located at 137.8 kilometres (85.6 mi) is a sandstone culvert. The culvert is arched, with stone wing walls, deck and abutments. The left half of the deck is missing. Internally, the culvert has a projecting base and the arch and floor of the causeway are lined with cut and dressed stone, coated in scale.

Located at 140.8 kilometres (87.5 mi) is a drainway and culvert. From a small culvert with a stone deck and mortared walls, a drain cut out of rock extends vertically over the top of the rock face.

Located at 143.39 kilometres (89.10 mi) is a sandstone culvert. The culvert is arched, with stone wing walls, deck and abutments.

Located at 143.69 kilometres (89.28 mi) is a sandstone culvert. The culvert is arched with picked stone wing walls and stone deck and abutments. Internally the culvert has a projecting base and the arch and floor of the causeway is lined with cut and dressed stone, coated in scale. Outside the entrance to the culvert are stone retaining walls.

Located at 144.99 kilometres (90.09 mi) is a sandstone culvert. The culvert is largely obscured by vegetation and is arched, with stone wing walls, deck and abutments.

Located at 145.33 kilometres (90.30 mi) is a sandstone culvert. The culvert is arched, with stone wing walls deck and abutments. Internally arch and floor of the causeway is lined with cut and dressed stone.

Located between the trolley shed and the platform of Spring Bluff, a wide drain with rendered stone walls passes underneath the track. Sitting above the drain is a rough timber beam and a small leaning timber guardrail.

Located underneath the platform at Spring Bluff between the station building and a large clump of bamboo is a stone culvert. The culvert is arched, with stone wing walls, deck and abutments. Internally the arch and floor of the causeway is lined with cut and dressed stone. At the entrance of the culvert are stone retaining walls. There is stonework above the abutments and timber beams attached to the platform sit above the entrance. A circular pipe draining from the station building is placed in a retaining wall of stone to the right of the culvert. Located among the gardens below the residences, a wide winding waterway, lined with sections of large rock and stone retaining walls, empties to a large circular concrete pipe, continuing underneath the track. Located below the Fettler's quarters is the entrance to a small drain, with stone walls and rough timber decking.

=== Cuttings ===
A number of double sided cuttings course through rocky spurs along the Main Range Railway. Each of these cuttings is short in length, accommodating a curving section of rail. Stabilising features occur on the cutting faces.

A cutting is located approximately 100 metres (330 ft) after the 137 kilometres (85 mi) peg. The cutting curves to the left, is high and steeply sloping, with sides of roughly equal height. Sections of concrete rendering occur on the right side of the cutting.

A cutting is located less than 250 metres (820 ft) past the 138 kilometres (86 mi) peg. The cutting curves to the right, is high and steeply sloping. The right side of the cutting is higher than the left, with vegetation growing out of the face. Sections of concrete rendering occur on both faces of the cutting.

A cutting is located between the 147 kilometres (91 mi) peg and the entrance to Tunnel 4 (147.25 kilometres (91.50 mi)). The cutting curves to the right and is short and low, with sides of roughly equal height. The right hand side is more steeply sloped than the left. Curving parallel to the cutting, at the base of the left side is a low guard of steel piping. A railway signal is located at the exit of the cutting

A cutting is located between Tunnel 8 (152.8 kilometres (94.9 mi)) and Tunnel 9 (153.85 kilometres (95.60 mi)). The cutting is high and curves to the right, with vegetation growing out of both faces. The right side of the cutting is higher while the left face is slightly steeper. Two sections of vertical stone or concrete walling are set into the left side of the cutting, roughly 1.5 metres (4 ft 11 in) apart.

A cutting is located between Swanson's Bridge (154.675 kilometres (96.111 mi)) and Tunnel 9 (153.85 kilometres (95.60 mi)). The cutting curves to the right and has a higher right side with vegetation growing on both faces from mid-height. Both faces pitch steeply near the base, sloping unevenly toward the top of the cutting. Curving parallel to the cutting, at the base of left side is a low concrete border.

=== Retaining and Stabilizing features ===
As the Main Range Railway ascends, numerous retaining and stabilising features occur on hillsides and banks to the right of the track. A wide range of materials and construction techniques are evident and features are set in at different heights.

Extending adjacent to the railway for approximately 50 metres (160 ft), terminating at QR cant sign 138.22 kilometres (85.89 mi) is a stone retaining wall. The wall is evenly course and with a quarry-face dressed stone. The wall is set in from the base on a steeply sloping hillside with a height close to four metres. Two small rectangular metal QR signs are attached along the wall and tufts of grass grow from mid-level upwards.

Between the 140 kilometres (87 mi) post and a culvert at 140.8 kilometres (87.5 mi), steep high sections of rock face along the railway incorporate a number of stabilising features. Situated next to a railway signal marked "HS 27", a drain has been cut out of the rock extending vertically from a concrete culvert upwards over the top of the rock face. Immediately to the right of the drain, close to the top of the rock face is a set in, oblong section of lightly coloured brickwork. Extending from the edge of the culvert, a sloped retaining wall begins with a short section of rubble coursed stone. The wall continues with a section of quarry-faced stonework of about two metres in height. Parts of this wall have been rendered in concrete, and a section is collapsed with exposed earth. From the termination of the stone wall, the rock face projects closer to the rail track. A low vertical retainer of brickwork less than a metre in height is set in to the rock from the base section, extending for approximately 25 metres (82 ft). Some distance on, set in to an eroded face of sandstone, are sections of brickwork. The bricks are of varying size and colour. The largest section of brickwork extends vertically and then horizontally in the "up" direction, and is surrounded by other smaller sections.

Between 143.17–143.39 kilometres (88.96–89.10 mi) is a section of stone retaining wall. The wall is rubble coursed, less than one metre high and is set into the base of a grassed, sloping bank approximately 2.5 metres (8 ft 2 in) high. A small rectangular metal QR sign has been attached to a stone along the wall.

Between a large, tiered modern cutting of shotcrete (known as Moggill's Wall and not of cultural heritage significance) and the entrance to Tunnel 3 (144.5 kilometres (89.8 mi)), a steep, high and long rock face incorporates a number of features. The rock face runs parallel to a large section of check railed curving track. The face begins with a wall of pick-faced, cut and dressed stone extending approximately seven metres high and wide. As the face increases in height, large sections of concrete rendering surround numerous areas of pick-faced exposed rock. Set in among eroded sandstone at various heights are sections of cut and dressed and mortared stone work. Small tufts of vegetation are scattered along the face. Directly outside the entrance to Tunnel 3, a high cutting of steep rock has extensive pick facing and a section of stone walling along its base.

Between the 148–149 kilometres (92–93 mi) posts a number of stabilising features are set in to the base of low sections of bank opposite the railway. Running parallel to a section of check railed curving track is a stone retaining wall. The wall is rubble coursed, and is set into the base of a steep low bank. Much of the higher portion of the wall is rendered and there is evidence of collapse. The wall continues for approximately 15 metres (49 ft), adjoining a low squared section of rock face close to the base, marked by a painted 7 within a white square. After passing a high tiered face of lightly coloured and loosely packed rock, a small low bank running parallel to a short, straight section of rail between two curves incorporates a number of features. Parallel to where the rail straightens is a steeply sloping retaining wall of brick. The bricks range in colour from orange to brown and are labelled: Campbells Redbank. The brickwork adjoins a low vertical section of pick-faced rock that extends until the next curve. The face contains a small section of cut and dressed stone and brickwork set in underneath the rock face to the base. Above the bank set into the hillside a section of stone walling is largely obscured by vegetation.

A large, high steeply sloping rock face between the 152–153 kilometres (94–95 mi) posts is attached with sections of concrete. Most of the concrete occurs along the base, with steel rods inserted in some higher sections.

Between the 154–155 kilometres (96–96 mi) posts, set into a steeply sloping face are two sections of high retaining wall. The cut and dressed stone blocks are long and rectangular with a mixture of pick and quarry facing. A small section of rubble coursed stone work divides the two sections. Tufts of grass grow through the top half of the wall. The hillside shows evidence of subsidence above and adjacent to the walled section.

Between Swanson's Bridge (154.675 kilometres (96.111 mi)) and the Rangeview Station site (155 kilometres (96 mi)) is a section of stone retaining wall. The wall is located on a steeply sloping face and is high set, close to the treeline. Much of the wall is obscured by vegetation.

Between the 157–158 kilometres (98–98 mi) posts, close to the summit of the range and running parallel to a section of check-railed curving track is a retaining wall. The wall is set into the base of a steep rocky hillside and is of cut and dressed stone with quarry-faced stone. The wall extends for approximately twenty metres.

=== Bridges ===
A small number of bridges exist on the Main Range Railway, each differing in length, height and materials.

Located at 132.34 kilometres (82.23 mi) is a large concrete bridge that crosses Murphy's Creek. The bridge is supported by high concrete piers that widen towards their base. On top of the piers a steel girder spans the bridge. The bridge has an open deck, with the railway set into timber sleepers. A timber walkway with guardrail runs parallel to the bridge on its left hand side.

Located at 135.5 kilometres (84.2 mi) is King's Bridge, a medium length timber bridge, positioned over an underpass for Kherim Road, which is unsealed. The bridge is supported by six sets of three rounded pile piers, with diagonal braces bolted on each side. Each pier is capped with a single beam, upon which sit the timber girders that span the bridge. The bridge has an open deck, with the railway set into timber sleepers. A metal walkway runs parallel to the bridge on its south side. Concrete retaining walls supported by steel posts, are placed underneath both ends of the bridge.

Located at 154.960 kilometres (96.288 mi), over an unnamed gully near the top of the Toowoomba Range, is Swansons Rail Bridge. It is an unreinforced concrete arch construction, 99 feet (30 m) in length, built on a steep slope. It is curved in plan and consists of three 10.1 metres (33 ft) circular concrete arches, two concrete piers and two abutments. It carries a single 1.07 metres (3 ft 6 in) gauge railway and is built to a 12-ton axle load. The structure is detailed with prominent cornices at the bases of the arches and incised lines on the spandrel walls of a form similar to the joints that would occur in a stone bridge. The bridge is in a remote location accessible only by rail staff. It commands a vast view over the Toowoomba Range.

Located at 157.76 kilometres (98.03 mi), marking the end of the Main Range ascent is the Ruthven Street overbridge (Picnic Bridge). The bridge sits high above the railway, situated close to the site of the former Harlaxton Station and carries northbound traffic on Ruthven Street. The bridge is a riveted plate girder bridge, decked in concrete and supported on brick abutments with stone quoins. The features of the bridge are largely obscured by a pipework pedestrian bridge on its east face and a duplicate concrete bridge on its west face. These are later bridges and are not considered of cultural heritage significance.

=== Cliffdale Quarry ===
Located between Tunnel 3 (144.5 kilometres (89.8 mi)) and Spring Bluff Station (146.17 kilometres (90.83 mi)) is Cliffdale Quarry. Set in some distance on the north side of the railway, the rock face of the quarry is high, steep and uneven. A number of trees grow out of the face and large amounts of rubble stone sit at its base. The formation of a siding sits adjacent to the railway within a wide grassed area. A thick wall of concrete is set into a sloping vegetated bank above the siding, flanked by walls of concrete and rubble coursed stone. A large concrete block sits in front of the wall, mounted by a short timber beam attached by steel rods. A timber Queensland Rail sign above the cement work prohibits fossicking. Above the bank a large level grassed area extends to the base of the quarry face.

=== Spring Bluff railway station ===
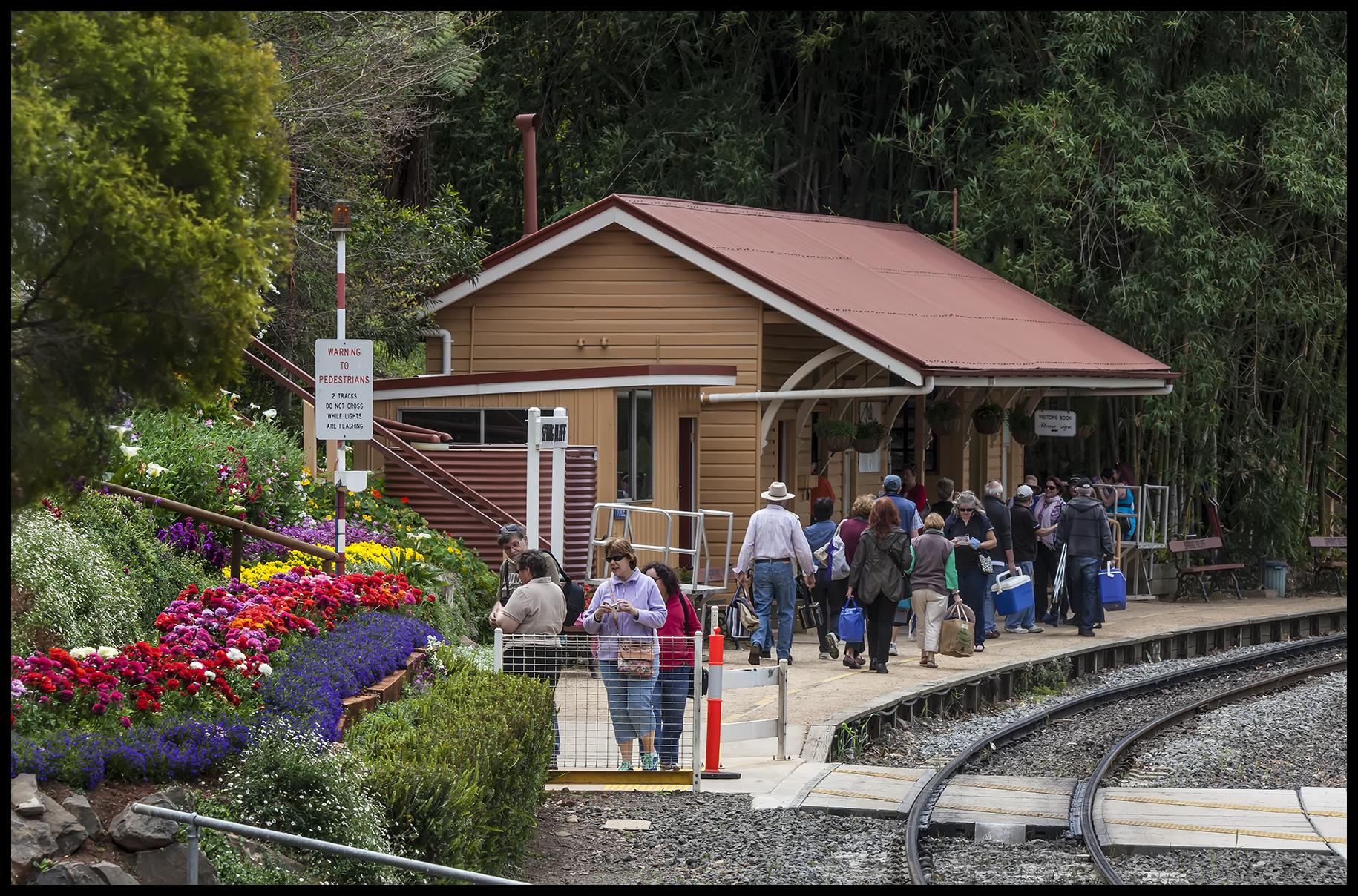
Spring Bluff railway station, known for its gardens, 2014

The Spring Bluff railway station complex is located 146.17 kilometres (90.83 mi) from Roma Street Station along a large level curve of the Main Range Railway (27.4654°S 151.9761°E). The key features of the site are located on a series of terraces cut into the escarpment of the main range, on the north side of the railway, surrounded by native vegetation composed predominantly of open eucalypt forest. A station building and platform, railway residences, timber pavilion and other built structures are placed among expansive landscaped gardens and open grassed areas.

Garden beds with stone terracing and beds with retaining walls of stone, timber or concrete occur on both sides of the railway. In a garden bed below the Fettler's Quarters, large white stones set into concrete form the words: Spring Bluff. A mixture of exotic and native trees and shrubs are scattered among the site. Prominent plantings include a large clump of bamboo next to the station building and a nearby London plane tree (platanus acerifolia) (1870) with a commemorative plaque at its base.

Facilities for recreation on the grounds include picnic tables, a cricket pitch and a railway carriage used for refreshments. Left of the railway, adjacent to a fenced bitumen carpark, is a modern Queensland Rail residence. A crossing loop runs along the extent of the station.

==== Station Building and Signal Cabin ====
The Spring Bluff Station building is a single storeyed rectangular timber structure, centrally positioned on the south-east facing station platform. The building is timber-framed and clad with chamferboards, except for the rear elevation, which has exposed stud framing to the shelter shed and ladies waiting room (which appear to be the earliest sections of the building). The whole is set on low set concrete stumping. A gabled roof of corrugated iron projects towards the platform, supported by curved and chamfered timber brackets with single-faced bosses.

The building comprises four sections: ladies waiting room, shelter shed, office and an electric staff instruments room.

At the north-east end of the building is the ladies waiting room. This has a four-panel timber door with fanlight and a sash window to the platform. At the rear corner of the waiting room, horizontal timber louvres form a window and a small door provides access at the base. There is a double-hung sash window in the rear wall.

Adjoining is the shelter shed with timber bench seats around the walls, two sets of pivoting timber shutters on the rear wall and a floor lined with timber boards. The rear wall is lined with horizontal beaded tongue and groove joinery. The north-east internal wall has vertical tongue and groove lining, with a high small hinged door opening from the waiting room. The south-west internal wall is lined with chamferboards. Interpretative and other panels are mounted on the walls.

Adjoining the waiting area is the office. The elevation to the platform has a sash window and a four-panel timber door with fanlight. A mail slot is inserted into the chamferboard cladding. There is a double-hung sash window in the rear wall.

At the south-west end of the building is the electric staff instruments room, which is accessed from the platform via a four panel timber door. Internally, two red electric staff instruments sit on timber pedestals. A switch board is mounted on the wall to the right and the rear wall has a sash window. There is a double-hung sash window in the rear wall.

A World War II commemorative stone with plaque is located on the platform near the shelter shed. Above this, mounted on the station building wall, is a panel commemorating the 50th anniversary of the end of World War II.

At the north-east end of the platform is a two-lever ground frame. At either end of the platform are timber signs displaying the name of the station: Spring Bluff.

Set in against the hillside at the rear of the building, is a coursed stone wall incorporating the remnants of an arched brick fireplace.

Immediately adjacent to the station building, at its south-west end, is a detached signal cabin. This is a small square structure with a skillion roof, clad with metal sheeting, and has aluminium-framed windows. A modern water tank collects rainwater from gutters of the signal cabin. The signal cabin building and the rain water tank are not of cultural heritage significance, but the cabin houses two culturally significant elements: a steel, 15 lever frame, set into timber floorboards, and a timber-framed cabin diagram mounted on the rear wall.

Next to the water tank a long flight of exterior timber stairs leads to the gardens and the Station Masters House.

Set high into the hillside above the railway at the rear of a large landscaped area, three timber buildings, all former railway residences, extend to the west.

==== Station Master's House ====
The Station Master's house is a timber building, sheltered by a hipped roof clad with corrugated iron sheeting. The building faces south-east, is clad with weatherboards and chamferboards, and stands on timber stumps, on a slightly sloping site. At the rear of the residence is an attached kitchen, with a broken gable roof. The kitchen is clad with chamferboards of varying widths, some up to 30 centimetres (12 in).

The main elevation has a central four panel timber door with multi-pane sash windows on either side. A separate corrugated iron roof shelters a lean-to verandah. The verandah is enclosed by post and rails extending from either side of the central staircase. The side balustrading of the verandah is filled with weatherboards.

The south-west elevation has a multipane sash window covered by a metal hood. A second, unhooded window of glass louvres is partially obscured by a corrugated iron water tank, set on high timber stumps and base. A small set of timber stairs lead to a screened side door. The detached kitchen section of the elevation contains a corrugated iron stove recess with a projecting vent pipe. The rear elevation includes a hooded sash window and timber door, both with security grills. Along the north-east elevation are three hooded sash windows, smaller meshed window, a side door and a small paved courtyard.

The front garden beds are bordered by timber posts.

==== Night Officer's House ====
The Night Officer's House is a long rectangular timber building, sheltered by a gabled roof clad in corrugated iron. The building faces south-east, is clad with weatherboards and stands on timber stumps, on a slightly sloping site. An attached rectangular structure sits at the rear of the building. The main elevation has a projecting front gable bay on the south-west corner with decorative timber infill. Beneath the gable is a large window shaded by a timber awning, covered by a small pitched iron roof. The south-west half of a former front verandah has been enclosed with weatherboards, incorporating two sets of aluminium framed sliding windows. A small set of timber steps leads to the section of open verandah and entrance, enclosed by a timber post and rail with circular timber balustrading. The rear wall of the verandah is clad in chamferboard and has two sash windows.

A modern timber picket fence, bordered by an external garden bed marks the entrance to the house.

==== Fettler's Quarters ====
The Fettler's Quarters is a small rectangular timber structure sheltered by a gabled roof clad in corrugated iron. The building faces south-east, is clad with a mixture of weatherboards and chamferboards and stands on timber stumps, on a slightly sloping site. The main and rear elevations have centrally placed sash windows. Attached to the north-east of the earlier quarters is a more recent rectangular structure clad in corrugated iron, sheltered by a skillion roof. The main elevation has a timber door and a window with two sets of glass louvres. A similar window exists on the rear elevation of the building. A venting pipe projects from the roof.

At the front of the building is a set of tiered garden beds divided by timber retainers and posts.

==== Pavilion ====
Located high above the grassed area with the cricket pitch, a winding bitumen path leads to a grassed clearing containing a timber pavilion. The pavilion is a large rectangular timber structure, open-sided and sheltered by a gabled roof clad in corrugated iron. The building faces south-east, and stands on timber stumps on a slightly sloping site. Internally, an exposed timber frame decorated in graffiti supports the length of the roof. Bench seats are built into the perimeter on all sides of the pavilion and the floor is lined with timber boards. The perimeter posts are fitted with diagonal braces attached to horizontal beams on the roof frame. On the south-west and north-east elevations, the posts support gabled infills of unpainted corrugated iron.

To the rear of the pavilion, a timber-framed structure with three sides of corrugated iron shelter a fireplace. Nearby is a timber ablutions block, containing male and female rest rooms.

==== Trolley Sheds ====
Located approximately 100 metres (330 ft) east of the platform along the railway is the trolley shed. The trolley shed is rectangular, clad in unpainted corrugated iron and sheltered by a skillion roof. The main elevation is filled by three bays, each with hinged double doors with vertical timber slats and internal diagonal braces.

Two smaller storage spaces sit on either side of the trolley shed. To the north-east is a storage shed of similar design to the trolley shed, with a single door. To the south-west is a timber structure. The building is clad with weatherboards and sheltered by a gabled corrugated iron roof. On the main and south-west elevation are entrance doors.

== Heritage listing ==
Main Range Railway was listed on the Queensland Heritage Register on 5 February 2009 having satisfied the following criteria.

The place is important in demonstrating the evolution or pattern of Queensland's history.

The Main Range Railway is important in demonstrating the pattern of development in Queensland, as a major government investment in infrastructure to facilitate the economic development of Queensland. An immense undertaking for its time (1865–1867), involving a large workforce and a dramatic alteration of the landscape, the Main Range Railway is one of Queensland's most significant early public works.

The Main Range Railway is important in demonstrating the evolution of Queensland's railway network and the objective behind its establishment. The Main Range Railway inaugurated the pattern of extending Queensland railways westwards from ports across the Dividing Range to assist the development of inland Queensland.

The Main Range Railway (constructed 1865–1867) was the earliest railway crossing of the Great Dividing Range in Queensland and in Australia, opening earlier than the Zig Zag Railway in the Blue Mountains of New South Wales, under construction from 1863 to 1869. It is also believed to be the world's first main line narrow gauge railway.

The place demonstrates rare, uncommon or endangered aspects of Queensland's cultural heritage.

The substantially intact tunnels of the Main Range Railway demonstrate a rare aspect of Queensland's cultural heritage, being among Australia's earliest railway tunnels built in the 1860s.

Tunnel 8 demonstrates a rare aspect of Queensland's cultural heritage as the only example of a side gallery on a railway tunnel thought to exist in Australia.

The gardens of Spring Bluff Station demonstrate a practice: beautifying railway station grounds for the aesthetic appreciation of train passengers and visitors.

The Ruthven Street overbridge is Queensland's oldest extant metal rail overbridge with a length of approximately 40 feet (12 m). The overbridge features a now rare use of brick abutments for a railway bridge. They are thought to be the oldest surviving examples of this type in Queensland.

The place has potential to yield information that will contribute to an understanding of Queensland's history.

Where locations of former campsites still exist within the railway reserve on the Main Range, there is potential to reveal information on the organisation and domestic life of 1860s railway camps in Queensland.

The place is important in demonstrating the principal characteristics of a particular class of cultural places.

The Main Range rail ascent is important in demonstrating the principal characteristics of a railway range crossing. The railway climbs from Murphy's Creek at the base of the Great Dividing Range to the summit at Harlaxton. Along the route engineering features responded to challenging and variable terrain, as demonstrated in the provision of nine tunnels, numerous culverts, cuttings and embankments, and extensive use of curved track. The line originally included the construction of 47 bridges (mostly timber), but these have been gradually replaced by culverts and embankments.

In particular, the tunnels of the Main Range Railway demonstrate the high quality of work of Engineer-In-Chief Robert Ballard, who was appointed specifically for his expertise in this field of railway engineering.

The place is important because of its aesthetic significance.

The Main Range Railway is important because of its aesthetic significance. The railway offers a variety of built and natural landscapes. Cuttings, tunnels and other built features illustrate the human effort required to construct the railway. Sections of the winding railway can be seen making their way up the range. Changing vistas of steep timbered hills, gullies and distant ranges extend south-east to the coastal plain.

The assemblage of landscaped gardens, railway buildings and natural setting at Spring Bluff station are a feature of the Main Range Railway.

The place is important in demonstrating a high degree of creative or technical achievement at a particular period.

The Main Range Railway is important in demonstrating a high degree of technical achievement in 1860s Queensland. As part of the main line between Ipswich and Toowoomba, the Main Range Railway ascent, Queensland's first range rail crossing, utilised the medium of narrow gauge on a size and scale previously unknown, either in the Australian colonies or in other countries. Over challenging and variable terrain and an incline close to 365 metres (1,198 ft), the Main Range Railway demonstrates the extent of engineering necessary to construct the route, as evidenced in the substantial use of tightly curved track, tunnels, culverts, cuttings, embankments and bridges.
