= North Toowoomba, Queensland =

North Toowoomba
- Suburb
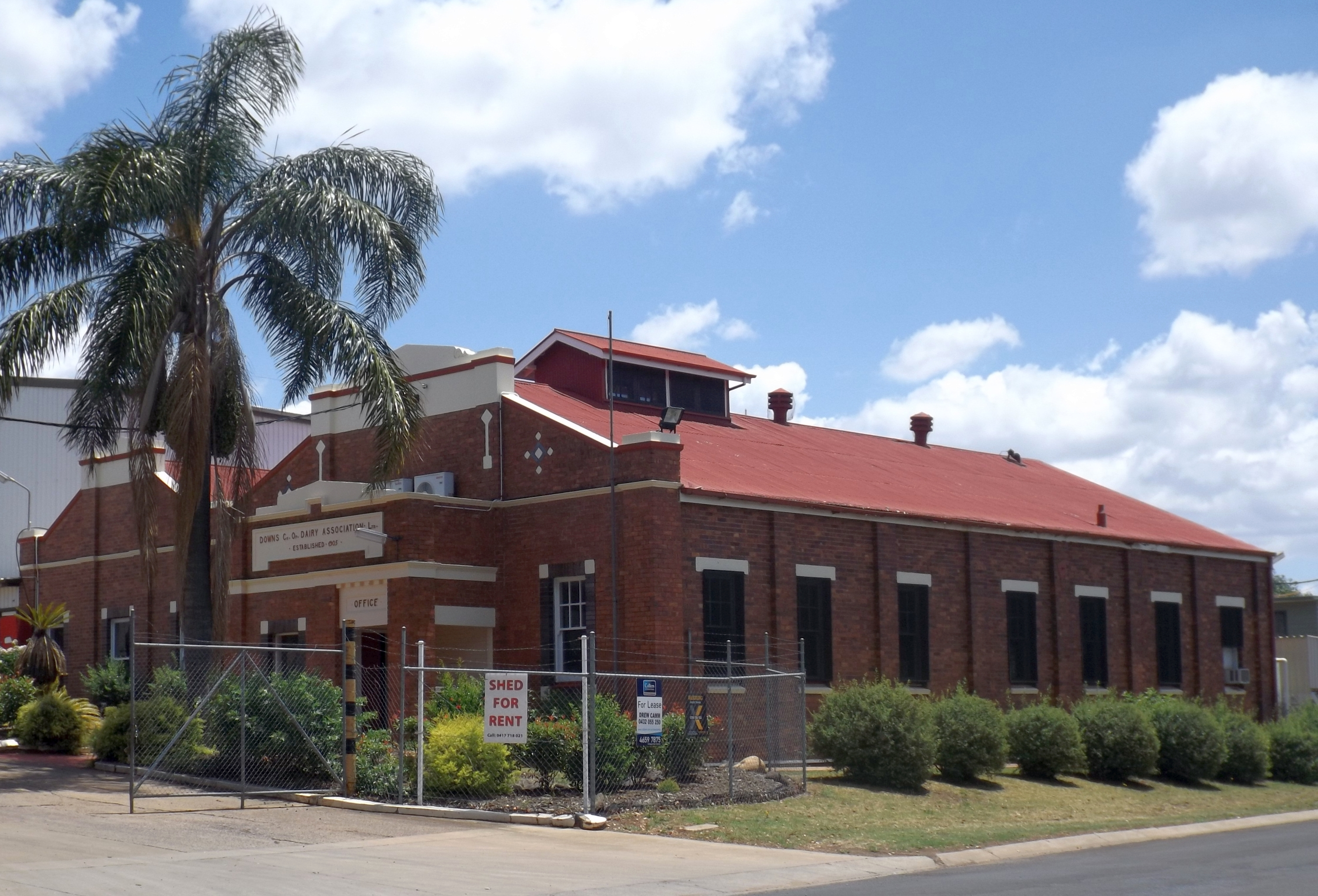
- The Downs Co-operative Dairy Association Limited Factory, 2014

- Interactive map of North Toowoomba
- Coordinates: 27.5463°S 151.9538°E
- Country: Australia
- State: Queensland
- City: Toowoomba
- LGA: Toowoomba Region
- Location: 2.1 km (1.3 mi) N of Toowoomba CBD; 128 km (80 mi) W of Brisbane

Government
  - State electorate: Toowoomba North
  - Federal division: Groom

Area
  - Total: 2.0 km^{2} (0.77 sq mi)

Population
  - Total: 3,332 (2021 census)
  - Density: 1,670/km^{2} (4,310/sq mi)
- Time zone: UTC+10:00 (AEST)
- Postcode: 4350
Suburbs around North Toowoomba
Rockville	Harlaxton	Mount Lofty
Newtown	North Toowoomba	Mount Lofty
Newtown	Toowoomba City	East Toowoomba

North Toowoomba is a suburban locality in Toowoomba in the Toowoomba Region, Queensland, Australia. In the 2021 census, North Toowoomba had a population of 3,332 people.

== Geography ==
North Toowoomba is located directly north of the Toowoomba city centre.

The New England Highway travels along Ruthven Street, entering the suburb from the north (Harlaxton) and exiting to the south (Toowoomba CBD).

The Main Line railway also enters the suburb from the north (Harlaxton) and exits to the south (Toowoomba CBD). The Western railway line enters the suburb from the south (Toowoomba CBD) and exits to the north-west forming the boundary between Rockville and Harlaxton. There are no railway stations in the suburb, although historically there were railway sidings for industrial use, e.g. the dairy factory.

== History ==
Toowoomba North Boys State School and Toowoomba North Girls and Infants State School both opened in 1869. In 1937 the two schools were combined to form Toowoomba North State School. However, despite the name, the school is officially within Toowoomba City rather than in North Toowoomba.

St Thomas' Anglican Church was dedicated on 19 December 1920 by Archdeacon Osborn. The church building was originally constructed on Ruthven Street near the railway line in the late 19th century by Canon Jones, and had been disassembled and rebuilt at the corner of Allan and Jellicoe Streets (27.5466°S 151.9579°E). The church's closure on 3 February 2008 was approved by Assistant Bishop Nolan. It has since been converted into a private home.

== Demographics ==
In the 2006 census, North Toowoomba had a population of 3,062 people.

In the 2011 census, North Toowoomba had a population of 3,049 people.

In the 2016 census, North Toowoomba had a population of 2,953 people.

In the 2021 census, North Toowoomba had a population of 3,332 people.

== Heritage listings ==
There are a number of heritage-listed sites in North Toowoomba, including:

- The Downs Co-operative Dairy Association Limited Factory, 57 Brook Street

== Education ==
There are no government schools in North Toowoomba. The nearest government primary schools are Harlaxton State School in neighbouring Harlaxton to the north, Toowoomba East State School in neighbouring East Toowoomba to the south-east, and Toowoomba North State School which, despite its name, is in neighbouring Toowoomba City to the south. The nearest government secondary school in Toowoomba State High School in neighbouring Mount Lofty to the east.

== Amenities ==
Martin Klein Park (also known as North Toowoomba Park) is at 130–136 Jellicoe Street (27.5463°S 151.9527°E). It has a cricket oval, playground, and picnic facilities.
