= Mount Kynoch, Queensland =

Mount Kynoch
- Suburb
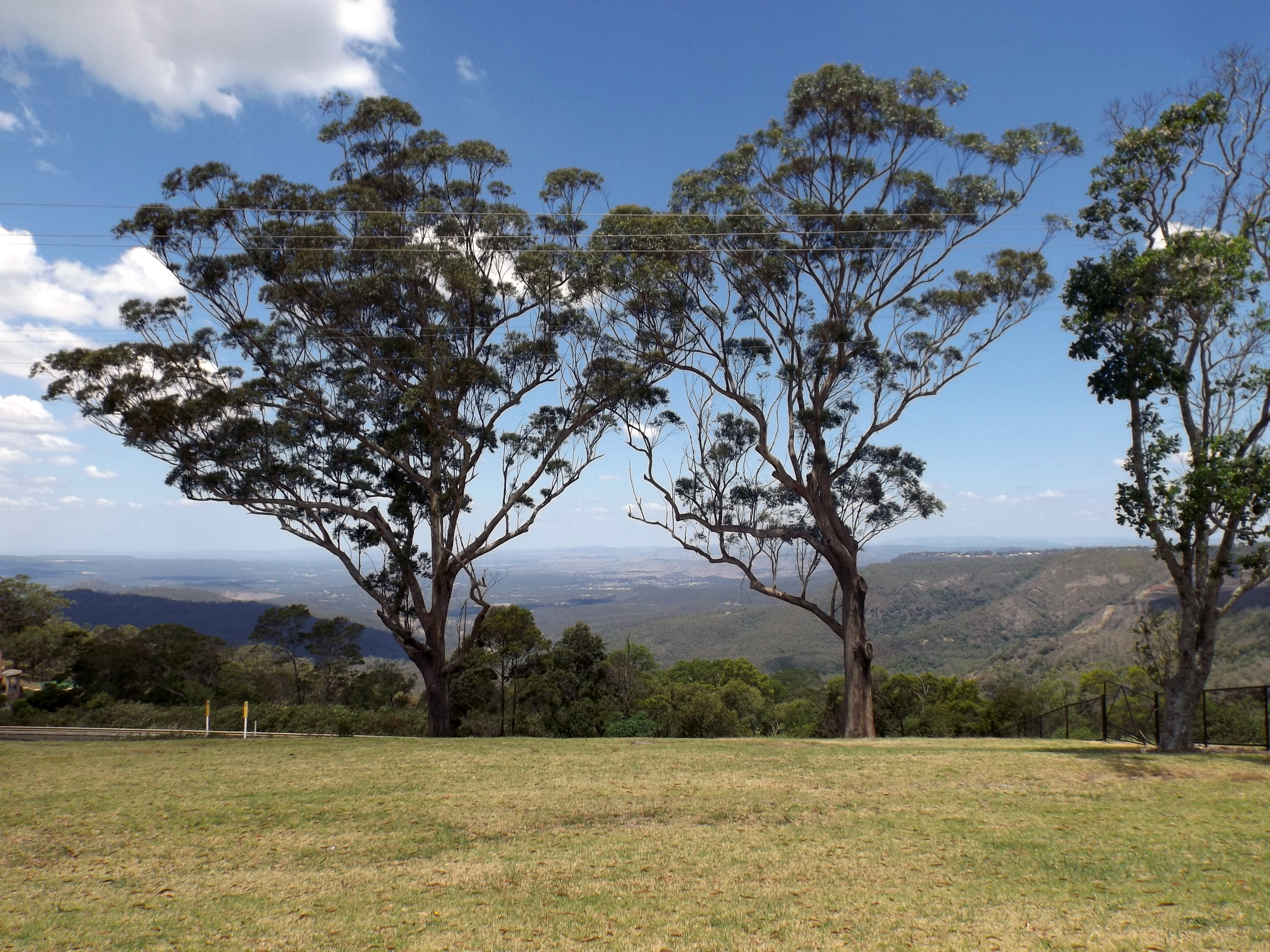
- View southeastwards from Mount Kynoch lookout, 2014

- Interactive map of Mount Kynoch
- Coordinates: 27.5102°S 151.9480°E
- Country: Australia
- State: Queensland
- City: Toowoomba
- LGA: Toowoomba Region
- Location: 6.2 km (3.9 mi) N of Toowoomba CBD; 133 km (83 mi) W of Brisbane

Government
  - State electorate: Toowoomba North

Area
  - Total: 3.3 km^{2} (1.3 sq mi)

Population
  - Total: 271 (2021 census)
  - Density: 82.1/km^{2} (213/sq mi)
- Time zone: UTC+10:00 (AEST)
- Postcode: 4350
Suburbs around Mount Kynoch
Birnam	Blue Mountain Heights	Blue Mountain Heights
Cranley	Mount Kynoch	Ballard
Cranley	Harlaxton	Ballard

Mount Kynoch is a rural locality in the Toowoomba Region, Queensland, Australia. In the 2021 census, Mount Kynoch had a population of 271 people.

== Geography ==
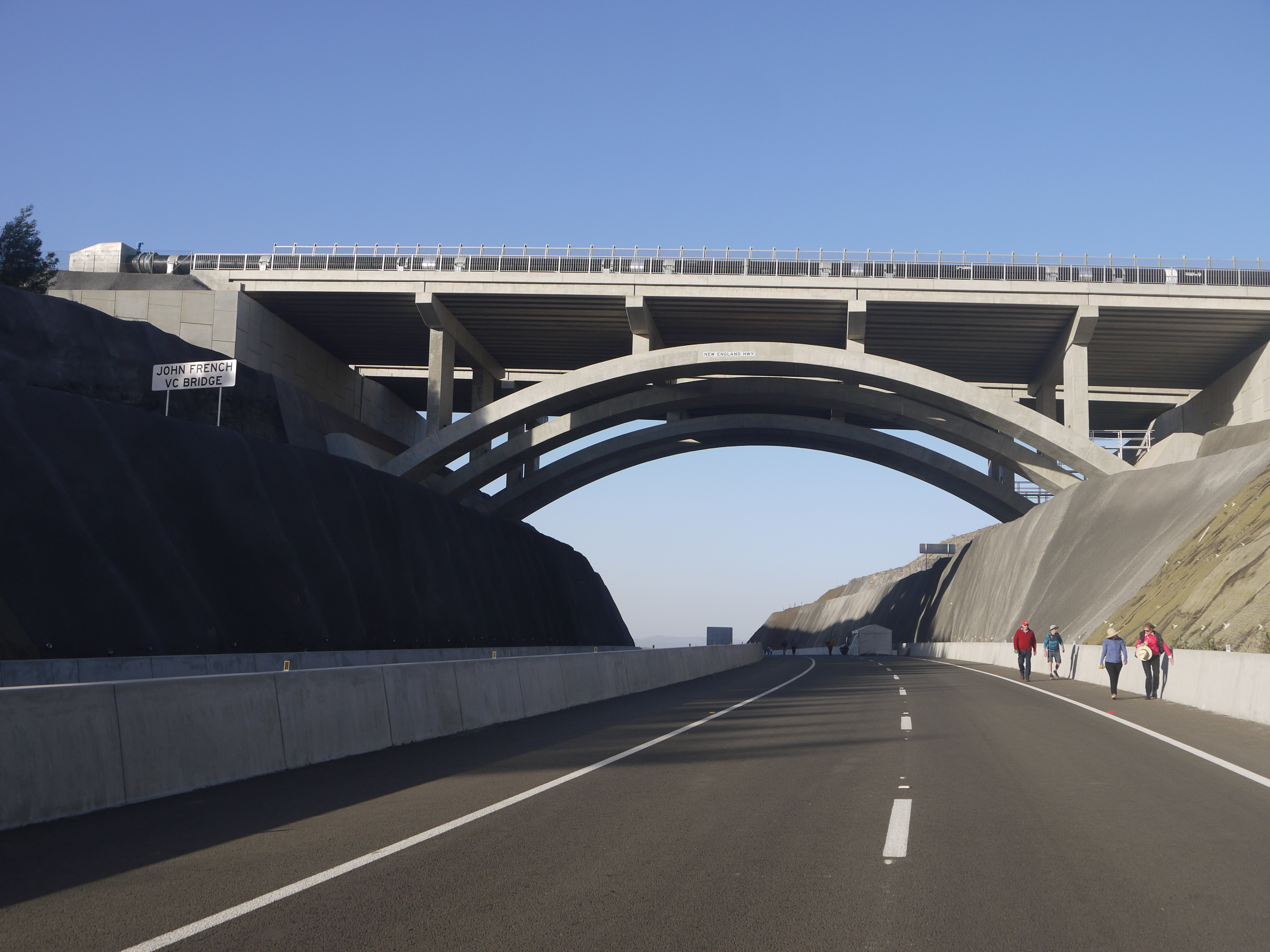
Toowoomba Bypass passing under the New England Highway, 2019

Mount Kynoch is located 6 kilometres (4 mi) north of the Toowoomba city centre.

The Great Dividing Range passes through the east of the locality with the mountain Mount Kynoch the only named peak within the locality (27.5097°S 151.9542°E). It rises to 709 metres (2,326 ft) above sea level.

The Main Line railway forms the eastern boundary of the locality with Rangeview railway station serving the locality (27.5164°S 151.9562°E).

The New England Highway enters the locality from the south (Harlaxton) and exits to the north (Blue Mountain Heights). The Toowoomba Bypass enters the locality from the south-east (Ballard), passes under the New England Highway (they do not intersect), and exits the locality to the south (Harlaxton).

== History ==
Originally the name Kynoch was used for a trigonometric station on the mountain originally known as Stony Pinch. Later both the mountain and the locality were named Mount Kynoch after John Kynoch, an early chairman of the Shire of Highfields.

== Demographics ==
In the 2016 census, Mount Kynoch had a population of 237 people.

In the 2021 census, Mount Kynoch had a population of 271 people.

== Education ==
There are no schools in Mount Kynoch. The nearest government primary schools are Harlaxton State School in Harlaxton and Highfields State School in Highfields. The nearest government secondary schools are Toowoomba State High School in Mount Lofty and Wilsonton State High School in Wilsonton Heights.

== Facilities ==
Mount Kynoch Water Treatment Plant is on the top of Mount Kynoch, accessed via Shuttlewood Court (27.5097°S 151.9546°E). It draws its water from Cooby Dam, Cressbrook Dam and Perseverance Dam.

== Amenities ==
There are a number of parks in the area:

- Hillsdale Crescent Road Park (27.5073°S 151.9637°E)
- Shuttlewood Court Park (27.5097°S 151.9548°E)

== Attractions ==
There are two lookouts in Mount Kynoch on either side of the New England Highway. The northbound lookout is on Shuttlewood Court beside the water treatment plant (27.5078°S 151.9560°E) and has picnic and park facilities. The southbound lookout is at (27.5120°S 151.9544°E) and provides views over the Lockyer Valley to the east.
