= Travis Passier =

Australian volleyball player (born 1989)

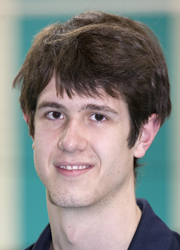
- Passier in 2011

Personal information
- Nationality: Australian
- Born: 26 April 1989 (age 37)
- Height: 2.08 m (6 ft 10 in)
- Spike: 351 cm (138 in)

Travis Passier (born 26 April 1989) is an Australian volleyball player. He competed for Australia at the 2012 Summer Olympics. Passier is a 6’10" middle blocker for the Australia men's national volleyball team. His nicknames are T-rannosaurus Pas, Trang pak, and Pasinator, and he speaks Italian and English.

== Early life ==
Travis Passier was born in Brisbane, Australia on 26 April 1989. He got his primary education at Fairview Heights State School in Queensland, and then attended Toowoomba State High School and Lake Ginninderra College for his secondary education. He holds a Bachelor of Science degree from the University of Canberra. In addition to volleyball, Passier played basketball and was a talented swimmer; "making numerous trips to the Queensland swimming titles."

Passier began playing volleyball "when he was 12 in Toowoomba through his brother and his brother’s high school team needing an extra player, and he was there to watch so (the team) asked him to play." He played his very first game of volleyball "as a Grade 6 Fairview Heights Primary School boy, playing for the Year 8 Mt Lofty side against Harristown High."

== Volleyball career ==
At age 15 he accepted a scholarship to the Australian Institute of Sport in Canberra where he was the youngest of only 16 volleyball athletes to be awarded a scholarship. He trained at AIS in hopes of reaching his goal of representing Australia at the Olympics. That goal was realized in 2012 when Travis got his chance to help lead the Volleyroos (Australian Men's National Volleyball Team) to qualify for the Olympics. Passier's family is very supportive of his volleyball career. His father Len and brother Jake, a former Toowoomba Titan volleyball player, traveled to London to watch him compete for Australia.

Passier started playing professional volleyball for the Toowoomba Titans in the Brisbane Premier Volleyball league. Through his playing with the Titans, he got the opportunity to play with the Australian national team. He got his first chance to represent Australia in 2006 and 2007 playing in the Junior and Youth Asian Cup tournaments. He then got his chance to play for the senior Australian National team at the 2008 Asia Cup, and then at the 2009 Asian Championships where he helped lead Australia to a 7th-place finish. When he first joined the senior team he was the youngest member of the squad. In 2010 he went back to his roots with the Titans after finishing the season in Denmark to keep up his skills for the national team trials.

After playing for the Titans, Passier moved to Europe for more competitive professional volleyball. Playing in Sweden he finished 3rd in the league with his team, and then went to Denmark and won the Danish league title in 2010 playing for Marienlyst. Currently he plays professionally in Italy for the M. Roma Volley S.P.A in the very strong Italian league. Some of his career highlights he says are, "being in the starting 7 (for Australia) for World Championships in Italy in 2010, finishing 2nd at the Olympic Qualification Tournament to make the Olympic Games, and finishing 4th at the 2011 Asian Championships to keep our qualifications for the Games alive."
