= Spring Bluff, Queensland =

Spring Bluff
- Suburb
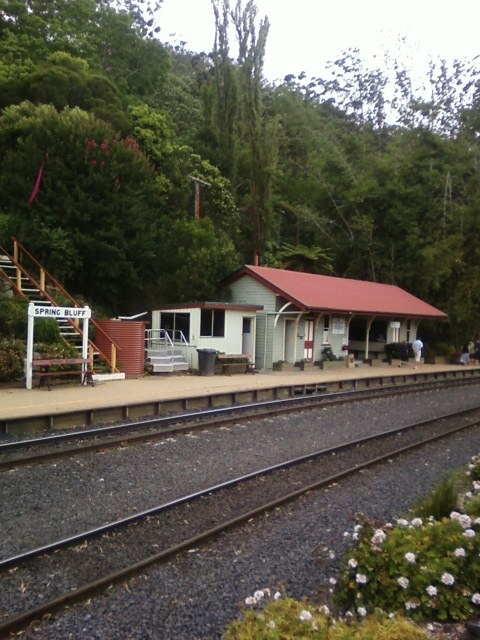
- Spring Bluff railway station

- Interactive map of Spring Bluff
- Coordinates: 27.4622°S 151.9788°E
- Country: Australia
- State: Queensland
- City: Toowoomba
- LGA: Toowoomba Region
- Location: 14 km (8.7 mi) NNE of Toowoomba CBD; 145 km (90 mi) W of Brisbane
- Established: 1860s

Government
  - State electorate: Toowoomba North
  - Federal division: Groom

Area
  - Total: 1.4 km^{2} (0.54 sq mi)

Population
  - Total: 0 (2021 census)
  - Density: 0.0/km^{2} (0.0/sq mi)
- Time zone: UTC+10:00 (AEST)
- Postcode: 4352
Suburbs around Spring Bluff
Highfields	Highfields	Cabarlah
Highfields	Spring Bluff	Murphys Creek
Highfields	Ballard	Ballard

Spring Bluff is a rural locality in the Toowoomba Region, Queensland, Australia. In the 2021 census, Spring Bluff had "no people or a very low population".

== Geography ==
Spring Bluff is situated 15 kilometres (9 mi) north of the city centre via New England Highway, and is adjacent to the town of Highfields.

== History ==
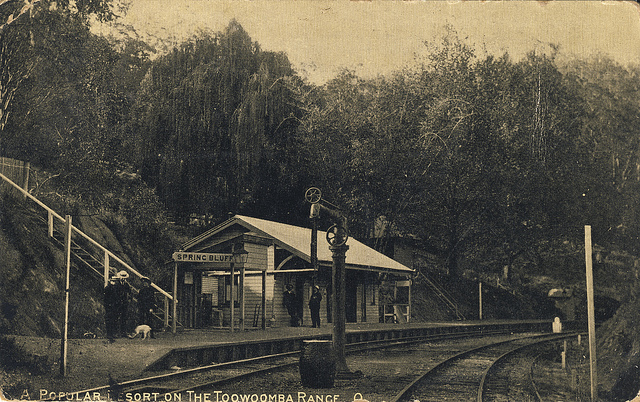
Spring Bluff Railway Station - postcard dated 23 December 1907

The area is named after a railway station in the area. The Spring Bluff railway station located on the boundary with Lockyer Valley Region local government area, was built in the 1860s to allow trains a place to stop during the steep climb from Brisbane to nearby Toowoomba. In 1890, it was named Spring Bluff after the spring water and the sandstone bluff in the area.

The railway station closed in August 1992. The station and its gardens are heritage listed, and are maintained by a trust consisting of the regional councils of Toowoomba and Lockyer Valley along with Queensland Rail, who also operate a cafe at the site. Due to the floods at Spring Bluff and nearby Murphys Creek in early 2011, the station was closed for repairs for several months.

== Demographics ==
In the 2016 census, Spring Bluff had a population of 6 people.

In the 2021 census, Spring Bluff had "no people or a very low population".

== Education ==
There are no schools in Spring Bluff. The nearest government primary school is Highfields State School in neighbouring Highfields to the west. The nearest government secondary school is Highfields State Secondary College, also in Highfields.
