= Swansons Rail Bridge =

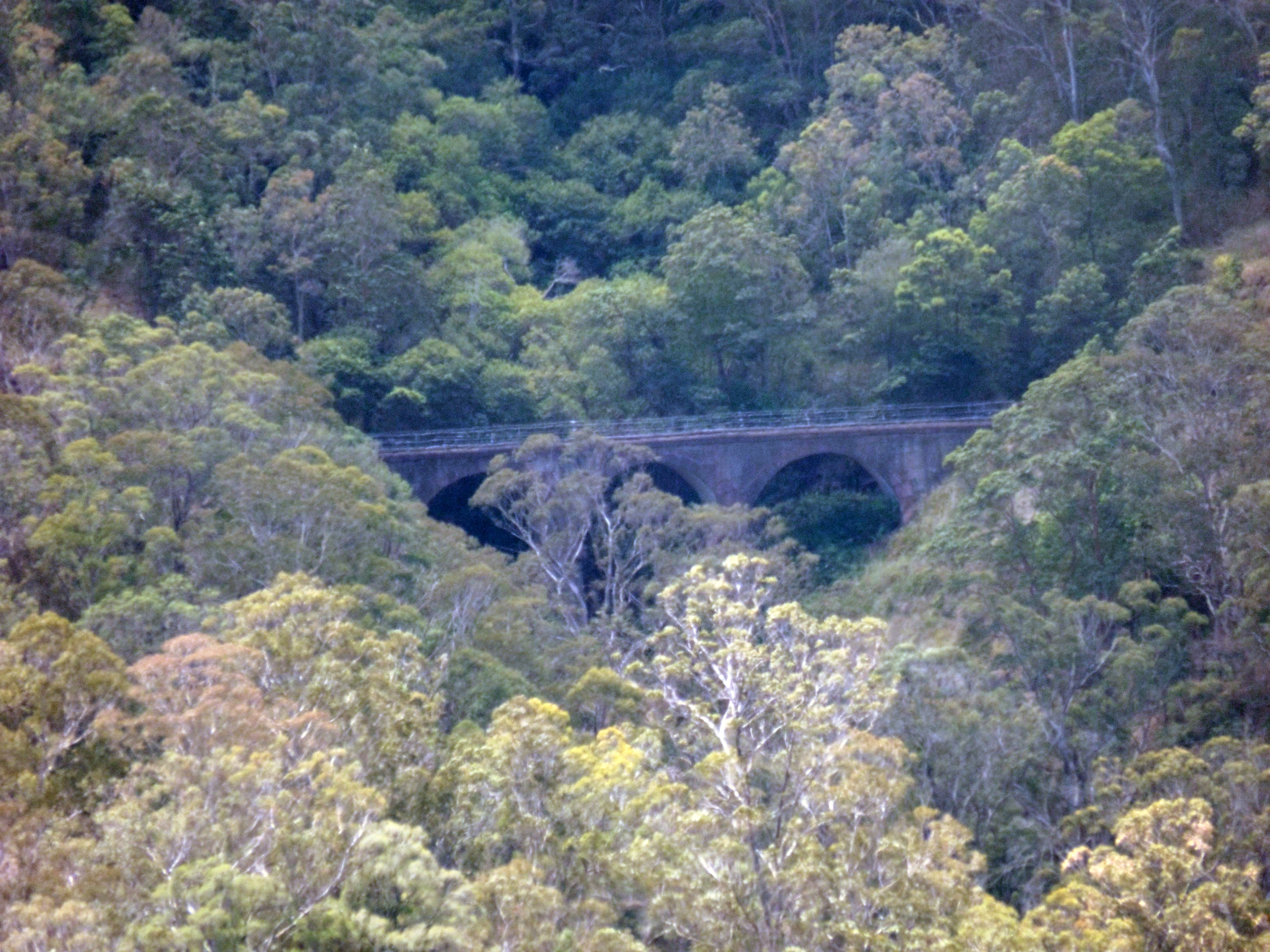
- Swansons Rail Bridge, 2014

- Location within Queensland Location within Australia
- 27.5104°S 151.962°E
- Location: 6 km (3.7 mi) north of Toowoomba, Ballard, Lockyer Valley Region, Queensland, Australia

History
- Design period: 1870s–1890s (late 19th century)
- Built: 1899–1900

Site notes
- Architect: William Pagan (railway engineer)

Queensland Heritage Register
- Official name: Swansons Rail Bridge
- Type: state heritage (built)
- Designated: 21 October 1992
- Reference no.: 600871
- Significant period: 1890s, 1900s (fabric)
- Significant components: pier/s (bridge), abutments – railway bridge
- Builders: day labour

Swansons Rail Bridge is a heritage-listed railway bridge at 6 kilometres (3.7 mi) north of Toowoomba at Ballard, Lockyer Valley Region, Queensland, Australia on the Main Line railway. It was designed by William Pagan and built from 1899 to 1900 by day labour. It was added to the Queensland Heritage Register on 21 October 1992.

== History ==
Following separation from New South Wales in 1859, the first Queensland Parliament met in May 1860. It was almost precisely three years later, in May 1863, that the bill to authorise construction of the first railway was introduced. It was passed in September of that year and provided for the construction of a line by the government from Ipswich to Toowoomba, Dalby and Warwick – the Southern and Western Railway as it was first called.

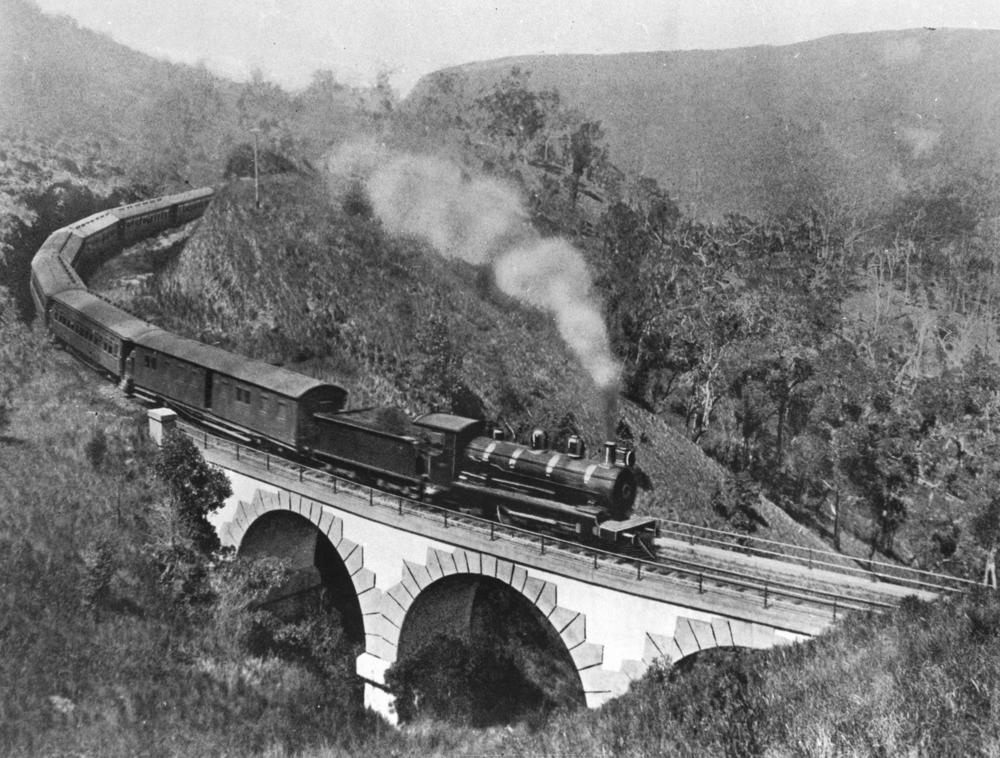
A passenger train speeds across the bridge circa 1912

Construction of Swanson's Bridge was commenced in 1899 and was completed in 1900. The new Swanson's Bridge replaced a former bridge of deck-type metal truss construction built in 1867 with the initial construction of the Main Range railway now known as the Main Line railway. As built, the Main Range railway had a considerable number of bridges which over the years were replaced by embankments and culverts so that the number of original bridges became fewer. But in 1899 an official three-year program was commenced to ease curves on the railway and replace high timber bridges with concrete culverts due to the increasing weight of rolling stock. The construction of Swanson's Bridge was a part of this program. The Commissioner's Annual Report for 1900 (p 76) notes:

Deviations on the Main Range for the purpose of easing curves and substituting earth embankments and concrete works for the iron bridges, which have been condemned as being too light for the increasing weight of rolling stock, have been carried on continuously by day labour. Several have been opened for traffic, including a three-concrete-arch viaduct.

Swanson's Bridge was the first of six concrete-arch bridges built for the Queensland Railways between 1900 and 1913. The drawing for the bridge was dated 1899 although the stress diagram is dated 1905. Professor O'Connor acknowledges Queensland and South Australia as distinctive in Australia for their concrete arch bridges. He attributes the design of Swanson's Bridge to William Pagan, Chief Engineer at the time.

The bridge does not appear to have been altered since construction and is still in use.

== Description ==
Swanson's Bridge is located on the Main Range railway, 1.5 kilometres (0.93 mi) south-south-west of Blue Mountain Heights and 6 kilometres (3.7 mi) north of Toowoomba, over an unnamed gully near the top of the Toowoomba Range. It is precisely located at the 154.960 kilometres (96.288 mi) mark on the Brisbane–Toowoomba railway.

The bridge is an unreinforced concrete arch construction. The bridge carries a single 3 ft 6 in gauge railway and is built on a steep slope. It is curved in plan and consists of three 10.1-metre (33 ft) circular concrete arches, two concrete piers and two abutments. It is built to a 12-ton axle load. It is 99 feet (30 m) in length.

It is detailed with prominent cornices at the bases of the arches and incised lines on the spandrel walls of a form similar to the joints that would occur in a stone bridge.

The bridge is in a remote location accessible only by rail staff. It commands a vast view over the Toowoomba Range. The bridge is still in use, is in good condition as well as being in its original state.

== Heritage listing ==
Swansons Rail Bridge was listed on the Queensland Heritage Register on 21 October 1992 having satisfied the following criteria.

The place is important in demonstrating the evolution or pattern of Queensland's history.

Swanson's Bridge is important in demonstrating the evolution of mainline engineering practice and more importantly the pioneering use of concrete as a form of construction material on the Queensland Railways.

The place demonstrates rare, uncommon or endangered aspects of Queensland's cultural heritage.

The bridge is the first of six concrete arch bridges built for the Queensland Railways between 1900 and 1913 and as such is an uncommon work of railway technology of the time.

The place is important in demonstrating the principal characteristics of a particular class of cultural places.

The bridge is the first of six concrete arch bridges built for the Queensland Railways between 1900 and 1913 and as such is an important example of its type as well as being a rare work of railway technology of the time.

The place is important because of its aesthetic significance.

Swanson's bridge has aesthetic value for its pleasing viaduct design as well as its position in the midst of the bush of the Toowoomba Range giving it a dramatic outlook from the escarpment it is built upon. The bridge has been used as a photographic location for photographers since after its construction.

The place is important in demonstrating a high degree of creative or technical achievement at a particular period.

Swanson's Bridge is important in demonstrating a high degree of technical achievement in the pioneering technique of concrete bridge construction. It is the first substantial unreinforced concrete arch rail bridge built in Queensland.

The place has a special association with the life or work of a particular person, group or organisation of importance in Queensland's history.

It also has special association with the work of William Page, Chief Engineer, who was responsible for the design of the bridge.
