= Murphys Creek Railway Complex =

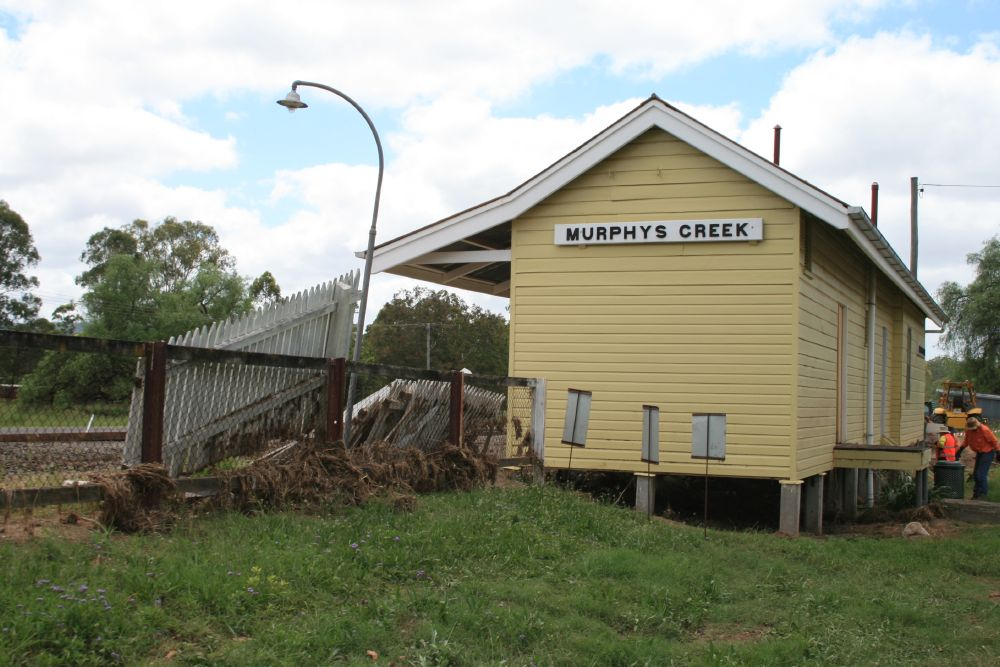
- Murphys Creek railway station, 2011

- Location within Queensland Location within Australia
- 27.4635°S 152.0592°E
- Location: Odin Street, Murphys Creek, Queensland, Australia

History
- Design period: 1840s–1860s (mid-19th century)
- Built: 1921–c. 1949

Queensland Heritage Register
- Official name: Murphys Creek Railway Complex, Murphys Creek Locomotive Water Tank and Tower
- Type: state heritage (landscape, built)
- Designated: 24 September 1999
- Reference no.: 601532
- Significant period: 1867–1992 (historical)
- Significant components: views to, tank – water

Murphys Creek Railway Complex is a heritage-listed railway yard on the Main Line railway at Odin Street, Murphys Creek, Queensland, Australia. It was built from 1921 to c. 1949. It is also known as Murphys Creek Locomotive Water Tank & Tower. It was added to the Queensland Heritage Register on 24 September 1999.

== History ==
Murphy's Creek Railway Station opened in 1867 on completion of the Main Range segment of the Ipswich-Toowoomba stage of the Southern and Western Railway. The station closed in 1992. The township of Murphy's Creek developed as a direct result of the construction of the railway station. The name Murphy's Creek was a reference to a creek named after a shepherd who had a hut in the area of the time of the 1864 survey for the Main Range Railway.

Tenders were invited in January 1867 for the construction of station buildings at Murphy's Creek.

Locomotives in the early years of operation on the Main Range had a limited water carrying capacity, and as a result water halts were required at Helidon, Murphy's Creek, and Highfields (later Spring Bluff). At Spring Bluff a 7,000-imperial-gallon (32,000 L; 8,400 US gal) water supply was created by damming a spring then gravity feeding the water to a water column situated in the station yard. Prior to the completion of the rail link, the Murphy's Creek area was referred to as a "feeding place for the engines" on the 30-kilometre (19 mi) range climb to Toowoomba, by a correspondent for the Brisbane Courier. Similarly, a journalist for the Darling Downs Gazette who had made the trip on a special picnic train from Murphy's Creek to Toowoomba prior to the opening of the Main Range Railway, described a water tank at Murphy's Creek for the use of locomotives.

In 1871 a goods shed was provided at Murphy's Creek for increasing goods traffic. Ten years after completion of the Southern and Western Railway, traffic on the line had increased to the extent that the station yard, track layout and buildings were considered cramped and additional room was required to pass trains, on the single line track. In May 1877 tenders were called for a booking office and platform; the accepted tenders were priced at £1,287 and £1,640 respectively. This work was completed in 1878, along with an extra siding. At the completion of the work in 1879 the water supply for locomotives was expanded with the installation of an 11,000 imperial gallons (50,000 L; 13,000 US gal) water tank.

The station yard was resignalled in 1884. At this time according to the Working Timetable, Murphy's Creek consisted of a station building, with telegraph connection and a watering point.

In November 1884 a reserve for railway purposes was set aside opposite the railway station. A forkline, or turning triangle, for locomotives was constructed on this site in 1885. Prior to construction of the forkline, the Working Timetable made mention of a turntable being situated at Murphy's Creek. The forkline was established in response to the inability of early steam locomotives to ascend the Main Range without reducing their load at Murphy's Creek. Trains would descend from Toowoomba to assist in hauling loads and from the early 1900s banking engines were used to help push trains up the Range from Murphy's Creek. At the same time that the forkline was constructed, a timber loading bank and gantry also were built, for loading stone from nearby quarries.

The ladies waiting room and the station lamp room were both destroyed by fire in February 1887. A new signal cabin and interlocked signalling was installed in 1913, as part of the duplication work being completed between Laidley and Helidon to speed up workings on the western main line, and increase train movements.

In 1917 Murphy's Creek was closed as a watering station for trains working on the Main Range and watering stops were provided elsewhere on the line. However, in August 1921 an 8,000-imperial-gallon (36,000 L; 9,600 US gal) single-tier water tank for use in emergencies was erected at Murphy's Creek, which was used by crews requiring additional water supplies running on to the Main Range section. Helidon was also supplied with watering facilities.

Water softening plants were installed at Helidon and Murphy's Creek, to soften water using lime. This was to prevent a buildup of scale in locomotive boilers that would shorten the life of boilers. A sand box (shed) was also provided to store sand which had been previously dried in a furnace, as an aid for traction on slippery rails on steep grades and sharp curves of the Main Range section. The sand shed was to replenish a reservoir situated atop the boiler barrel of locomotives (sand dome), and was activated by a lever in the engine cab. Water was pumped from the nearby creek into the storage tank by a steam pump, operated from a stationary boiler.

By 1949 the capacity of the 1921 water tank at Murphy's Creek had been doubled with the addition of a second tier to the tank. The largest tender capacity carried by a Queensland steam locomotive was 3,500 imperial gallons (16,000 L; 4,200 US gal), and the Murphy's Creek tank held approximately three times this amount.

The use of Murphy's Creek as a station diminished with the introduction of diesel-electric motive power in 1952, and complete dieselisation of Brisbane to Toowoomba services in June 1956. Prior to the introduction of the new motive power, on goods trains up to 12 hours could be spent working between Brisbane and Toowoomba. Prior to dieselisation in 1956, over 49 light engine movements alone were timetabled on the Toowoomba-Murphy's Creek section. 83 working hours a day was taken up in light engine running and banking time on the range from the Willowburn depot. Engines would also attach to trains at Helidon or Lockyer stations depending on how locomotives were performing. The new motive power eliminated the need to run attached locomotives on the range section.

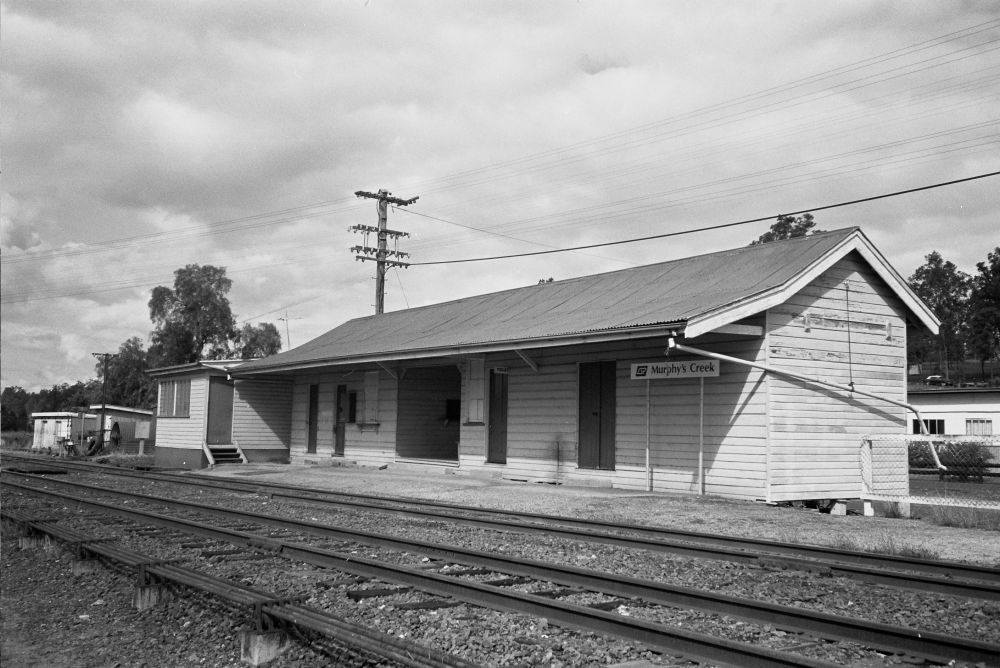
Murphys Creek railway station, 1994

In 1963 the raised timber platform at Murphy's Creek station (similar to that at Grandchester) was removed and replaced by a ground level gravel platform and a new 14-lever interlocked signal cabin was provided with the rearrangement of signalling of the Murphy's Creek shunting yard. Steam operations on the Main Range had ceased by the mid-1960s.

Murphy's Creek railway station was closed in 1992, with the introduction of Centralised Traffic Control (CTC) along the Main Range line. This form of computerised and radio safeworking rendered the former mechanical form of signalling, interlocking and staff working obsolete. The station and associated buildings were sold to the local Murphy's Creek Progress Association in 1993. The water tank was in use prior to and post closure as a water supply for the local township, and also as an emergency water storage facility during bush fires. The water tank was retained by Queensland Railways for the use of special steam-hauled excursion trains operating between Brisbane and Toowoomba, but was placed out of use in 1994.

== Description ==
Murphy's Creek Railway Complex, which includes a station building, signal cabin, water tank, trolley shed and forkline, is located in the rural hamlet of Murphy's Creek at the base of the Main Range. Most of the complex is contained within the railway corridor, with the forkline situated north-west of the corridor, on the opposite side of Odin Street. A crossing loop runs along the extent of the station.

=== Station Building ===
The Murphy's Creek Station building is a single-storeyed rectangular timber structure, centrally positioned on a north-east facing station platform. The building is timber-framed and clad with chamferboards, set on stumps. A gabled roof of corrugated iron projects towards the platform, supported by timber brackets.

The building consists of two sections, divided by a central open shelter shed. The main elevations of both sections have a multi-paned sash window and two timber doors that provide access to rooms from the platform. The two doors closest to the waiting area on each section are four-panelled timber doors.

The south-east end of the building (which appears to be the earlier section) has wide chamferboards of 270 millimetres (11 in). Mounted on the chamferboards facing the platform is a timber cabinet and two small metal "staff" boxes. The chamferboards on the north-west end of the building are of a shorter width.

The interior of the shelter shed has a ticket window on its south-east wall. chamferboards of a shorter width line the wall beneath window height. The rear wall is lined with vertical tongue and groove boards and an entrance provides access from the rear of the building. The floor is lined with timber boards.

The rear elevation has a multi-paned sash window in the south-east section with the wider chamferboards. A small flight of timber stairs lead to the shelter shed entrance. On the north-west end, access to a room is provided via a timber door.

The east elevation of the building has a hooded multi-paned sash window. A modern timber picket fence stands between the station building and the railway line.

=== Signal Cabin ===
The signal cabin is a free-standing small timber building sheltered by a skillion roof, located close to the station building at its south-east end. The cabin is clad in weatherboards and sits on a concrete base. The cabin has glass louvre windows on its main elevation and a set of timber casement windows on its east elevation. Access is provided by a door on its west elevation. A small corrugated iron watertank on timber stumps sits at the rear of the building.

=== Trolley Shed ===
Located approximately 25 metres (82 ft) east of the platform is the trolley shed. The trolley shed is rectangular, clad in unpainted corrugated iron and sheltered by a skillion roof. The main elevation is filled by three bays, each with hinged double doors with timber battens and internal diagonal braces.

=== Water Tank ===
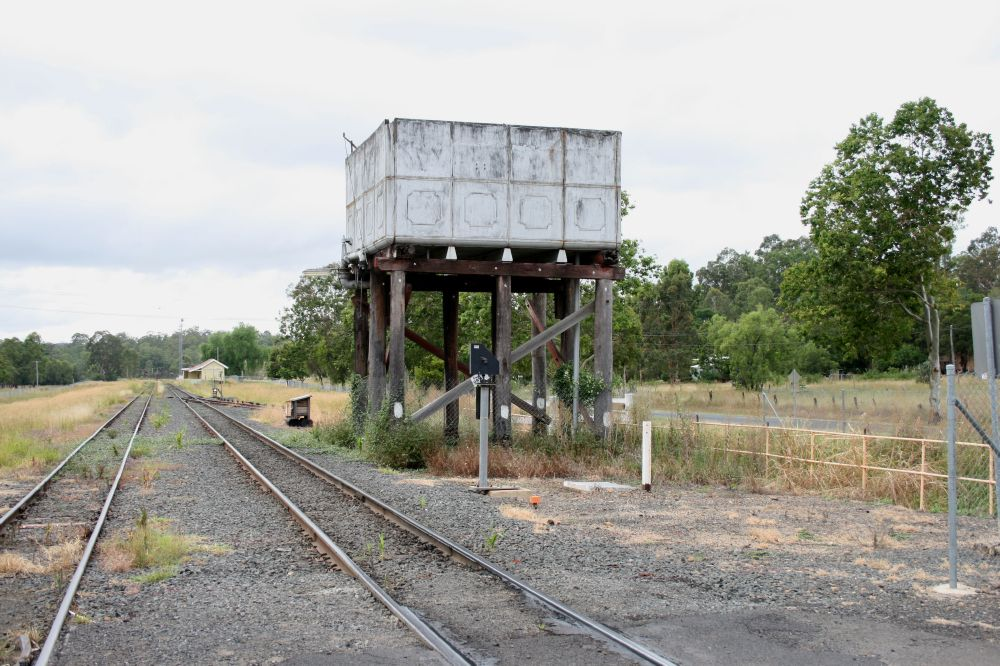
Water tank with station in the distance, 2009

Murphy's Creek water tank is situated 120 metres (390 ft) north-west of the Murphy's Creek railway station. The water tank is constructed of cast iron, with the 1921 8,000-imperial-gallon (36,000 L; 9,600 US gal) capacity tank forming the lower element of the water storage, and a second, later tier doubling the overall storage capacity. The lower tier features decorative castings on the iron facings. The tank is elevated above the height of the locomotive tender for a steam locomotive being supported on a timber frame approximately 6 metres (20 ft) in height, consisting of 10 hardwood cross braced piles. The piles are marked with inspection dates, detailing maintenance work, and timber treatment carried out until 1994.

The tank is internally braced, and also wind braced externally. Unlike the water tank retained at Grandchester station, the Murphy's Creek tank features a high flow water delivery system utilising a water jib or crane. An electric pump is used to reticulate water into the tank being supplied from mains power. A swing jib is situated on the north tank face adjacent to the mainline, and is used to deliver water through a gravity-fed pipe-work system into a corresponding filling hole on the tender water tank of a steam locomotive. A canvas hose is used to direct the flow of water into the tender tank. The jib is operated manually by a locomotive fireman standing on the tender tank, swinging the jib to a position 90 degrees from the face of the tank and controlling the flow of water from the jib via a valve and float system actuated on the filling pipe. An inspection ladder is situated on the east face of the tank enabling access to the tank for maintenance purposes. A fluorescent light is also affixed to the tank headstocks to illuminate the area at night.

Approximately four metres to the east of the tank base are three concrete foundation blocks used to support the former water softening plant (now removed). A wooden sandbox used to replenish sandboxes on diesel-electric locomotives with traction on the Main Range is also located adjacent to the base of the tank. A safety fence (1996), between the rear of the tank and a large drainage ditch, is situated at the Odin Street aspect of the tank base.

=== Forkline ===
Veering from the main line, between the station building and the watertank, is a turning triangle or forkline, on a raised formation in a large grassed area south of the railway corridor. A groundframe and electric release are positioned at the beginning of the forkline, which passes through a gate of timber post-and-rail over a small culvert. From the gate the railway crosses Odin Street extending in a large curve to the south, terminating at an earth stop block. To the west, it terminates at a raised concrete loading bank. A triangle is formed by a section of track that links the southern and western extensions before their termination. Trailing points are positioned on the southern and western corners of the turning triangle.

== Heritage listing ==
Murphys Creek Railway Complex was listed on the Queensland Heritage Register on 24 September 1999 having satisfied the following criteria.

The place is important in demonstrating the evolution or pattern of Queensland's history.

The Murphy's Creek Railway Complex is important in demonstrating the evolution of transport patterns in Queensland, in particular the establishment and development of Queensland's Railways during the steam locomotive era 1865–1969.

The provision of water to locomotives on the Main Range Railway was a critical part of the journey and the introduction of the Murphy's Creek Railway Station was directly related to its use as a watering stop.

The place demonstrates rare, uncommon or endangered aspects of Queensland's cultural heritage.

Murphy's Creek Water Tank is a rare and still operable water tank used for the replenishing of steam locomotives operating on the Main Range railway. Water tanks were a common and important feature of railway infrastructure in Queensland, but the majority have been demolished, sold or removed from railway property. The tank was maintained by Queensland Rail as a water supply for steam locomotives on special excursion trips between Brisbane and Toowoomba until 1994.

The place is important in demonstrating the principal characteristics of a particular class of cultural places.

In its provision of water tank, forkline, station building, signal cabin and trolley shed, the Murphy's Creek Railway Complex contributes to an understanding of steam locomotive and train operations on the Main Range Railway between Helidon and Toowoomba for a period of nearly a century, and serves as a reminder of the operation and maintenance of this form of locomotive technology.
