= Harlaxton, Queensland =

Harlaxton
- Suburb
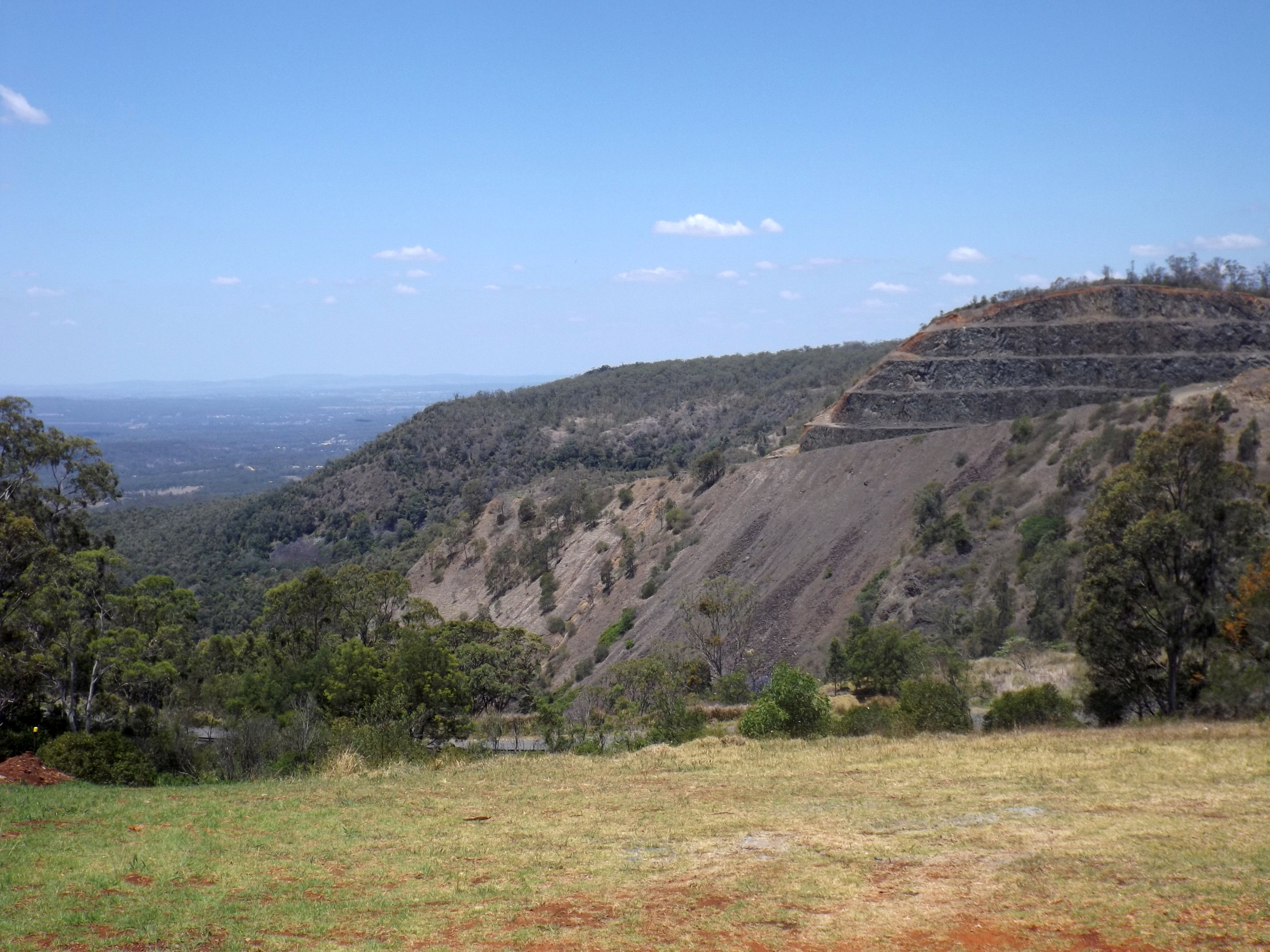
- View eastwards from Gilmour Court, 2014

- Interactive map of Harlaxton
- Coordinates: 27.5305°S 151.955°E
- Country: Australia
- State: Queensland
- City: Toowoomba
- LGA: Toowoomba Region
- Location: 4.2 km (2.6 mi) N of Toowoomba CBD; 132 km (82 mi) W of Brisbane

Government
  - State electorate: Toowoomba North
  - Federal division: Groom

Area
  - Total: 5.0 km^{2} (1.9 sq mi)

Population
  - Total: 2,824 (2021 census)
  - Density: 565/km^{2} (1,463/sq mi)
- Time zone: UTC+10:00 (AEST)
- Postcode: 4350
Suburbs around Harlaxton
Cranley	Mount Kynoch	Ballard
Rockville	Harlaxton	Mount Lofty
Newtown	North Toowoomba	Mount Lofty

Harlaxton is a locality in the Toowoomba Region, Queensland, Australia. Historically a rural area, most of the locality is now residential. In the 2021 census, Harlaxton had a population of 2,824 people.

== Geography ==
Harlaxton is located 4 kilometres (2 mi) north of the Toowoomba city centre.

Willowburn railway station is part of a large railway marshalling yard accessed via Davidson Street (27.5368°S 151.9470°E).

== History ==
The locality's name originates from Harlaxton House, probably named for Harlaxton in Lincolnshire, England, and built in 1869 in what is now Munro Street as the residence of Francis Thomas Gregory. Gregory was an explorer in Western Australia, before moving to Queensland in 1862, serving as Commissioner of Crown Lands and an appointed Member of the Queensland Legislative Council from 1874 until his death in 1888. The home was later used as the summer residence for Lord Lamington who served as Governor of Queensland from 1896 until 1901. It is widely believed that the iconic Lamington was first created here. Harlaxton railway station on the Main line railway was built nearby for his convenience (27.5289°S 151.9584°E). The house is in a deteriorating condition, partly due to blasts from the neighbouring quarries.

Harlaxton State School opened on 2 September 1901.

View Glen State School opened on 25 May 1914 and closed in 1924.

Downlands Sacred Heart College was established on 1 March 1931 by the Missionaries of the Sacred Heart as a boarding school for boys. The school had an initial enrolment of 68 students. In 1971 the school accepted day students, both boys and girls. From 1993 girls were also accepted as boarders, enabling siblings to attend the same school.

Holy Trinity Anglican Church was dedicated on 2 October 1966 by Archbishop Phillip Strong. It closed circa 1982.

== Demographics ==
Harlaxton is the most socio-economically disadvantaged suburb in Toowoomba; at the 2006 census, residents had a median individual income of $366, compared with $448 for the Toowoomba statistical district, and a median family income of $881 compared to $1,116. The suburb had a SEIFA score of 903, placing it below all other suburbs in the district.

In the 2016 census, Harlaxton had a population of 2,547 people. Aboriginal and Torres Strait Islander people made up 7.2% of the population. 81.1% of people were born in Australia. 86.9% of people spoke only English at home. The most common responses for religion were No Religion 24.9%, Catholic 21.3% and Anglican 15.6%.

In the 2021 census, Harlaxton had a population of 2,824 people.

== Heritage listings ==
Harlaxton has a number of heritage-listed sites, including:

- Harlaxton House, 6 Munro Street (27.5299°S 151.96°E)
- Tyson Manor, Ruthven Street within the grounds of Downlands College (27.5364°S 151.9585°E)

== Economy ==
Harlaxton has a history as an industrial centre. Apart from the quarries, the suburb is home to the Willowburn railway marshalling yard and the original Darling Downs Bacon Company established as a co-operative in 1911 (later KR Castlemaine).

== Education ==
Harlaxton State School is a government primary (Prep–6) school for boys and girls at 110 Ruthven Street (27.5398°S 151.9545°E). In 2017, the school had an enrolment of 130 students with 13 teachers (11 full-time equivalent) and 19 non-teaching staff (10 full-time equivalent).

Downlands College is a Catholic primary and secondary (5–12) day and boarding school for boys and girls at 72 Ruthven Street (27.5353°S 151.9576°E). In 2017, the school had an enrolment of 770 students with 70 teachers (68 full-time equivalent) and 49 non-teaching staff (35 full-time equivalent).

There are no government secondary schools in Harlaxton. The nearest government secondary school is Toowoomba State High School in neighbouring Mount Lofty to the south-east.

== Amenities ==
Harlaxton is also home to the Toowoomba Cricket Club and the Toowoomba Bears rugby union club, as well as the Willowburn Sports Club (soccer).

== Politics ==
In the 2004 federal election and again in the 2010 election, the booth at Harlaxton North was the only booth in the Division of Groom to record a Labor two-party preferred majority.
