= Mount Lofty, Queensland =

Mount Lofty
- Suburb
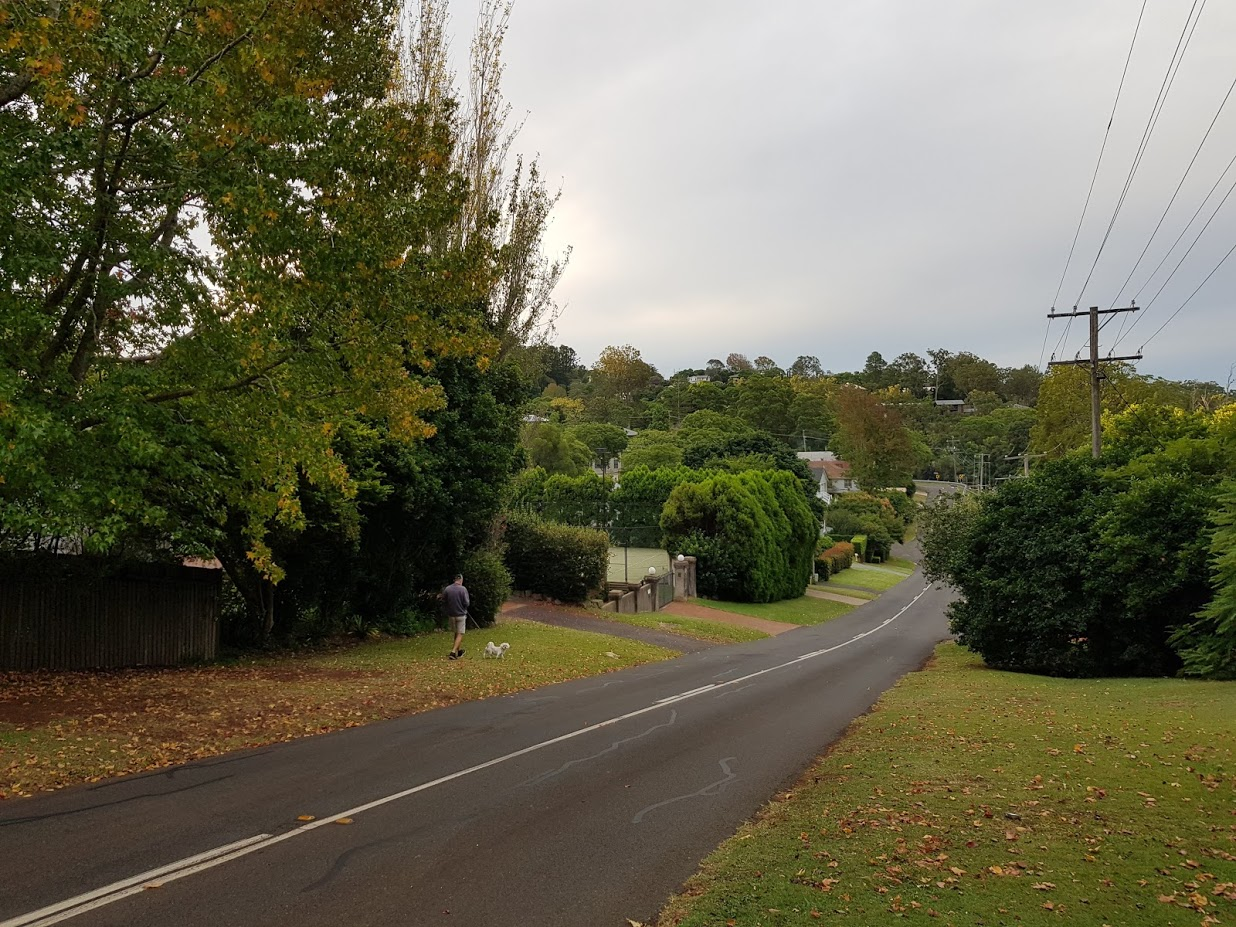
- Curzon Street, Mount Lofty

- Interactive map of Mount Lofty
- Coordinates: 27.5369°S 151.9838°E
- Country: Australia
- State: Queensland
- City: Toowoomba
- LGA: Toowoomba Region
- Location: 3.3 km (2.1 mi) NE of Toowoomba CBD; 127 km (79 mi) W of Brisbane

Government
  - State electorate: Toowoomba North
  - Federal division: Groom

Area
  - Total: 9.6 km^{2} (3.7 sq mi)

Population
  - Total: 3,825 (2021 census)
  - Density: 398.4/km^{2} (1,032/sq mi)
- Time zone: UTC+10:00 (AEST)
- Postcode: 4350
Suburbs around Mount Lofty
Ballard	Ballard	Withcott
Harlaxton	Mount Lofty	Withcott
North Toowoomba	East Toowoomba	Prince Henry Heights

Mount Lofty is a residential locality on the north-eastern edge of the suburban area of Toowoomba, in the Toowoomba Region, Queensland, Australia. In the 2021 census, Mount Lofty had a population of 3,825 people.

== Geography ==
Jubilee Park, a large parkland and bushland area with numerous riding trails, forms the eastern part of the suburb. At the end of North Street is the peak of Mount Lofty, which features a garden and rainforest, a lookout, and the transmission tower for WIN Television. Nearby is Toowoomba State High School (Mount Lofty Campus) and a rifle range used by Toowoomba Rifle Club, that is no longer in use.

== History ==
Mount Lofty was formerly known as Tick Hill.

There was a two-storey house called Longview on its crest, which was relocated from the Toowoomba CBD by Charles Cocks. The house was built for Cocks in the 1860s on the corner of Ruthven Street and Bridge Street. In 1904, Cocks had the house dismantled and rebuilt on the eastern end of North Street on a 40-acre (16 ha) site, where it overlooked Toowoomba. After Cocks's death in 1916, the house was occupied by his daughter Eleanor Sophia (Polly) Cocks who operated it as a boarding house (advertising it as having the health benefit of "flu cured two days"). After her death in 1956, the house was demolished. A reservoir occupies the site today at 13 North Street (27.5441°S 151.9719°E).

Toowoomba State High School and Technical College opened on 12 May 1919, after the Department of Public Instruction took over the Toowoomba Technical College. In January 1962, it became Toowoomba State High School.

On Saturday 14 August 1926, the Reverend William Goyen officially opened a Presbyterian Sunday School hall in Geoffrey Street, as an outreach of St Stephen's Presbyterian Church in Neil Street in the Toowoomba CBD. By 1927, it was being used for church services on a monthly basis and was known as the Geoffrey Street Presbyterian Church. In 1939, the hall was moved to a block on the south-east corner of Mary Street and Alford Street. On 12 November 1949, the foundation stone for the current church was laid by the Right Reverend William Frederick Mackenzie, the Moderator of the Presbyterian Church of Queensland. On Saturday 26 July 1952, the new church was officially opened as St David's Presbyterian Church by the Moderator of the Presbyterian Church of Queensland, the Right Reverend Malcolm McDermant. The old church remains on the site and is used as a hall.

== Demographics ==
In the 2016 census, Mount Lofty had a population of 3,775 people.

In the 2021 census, Mount Lofty had a population of 3,825 people.

== Heritage listings ==
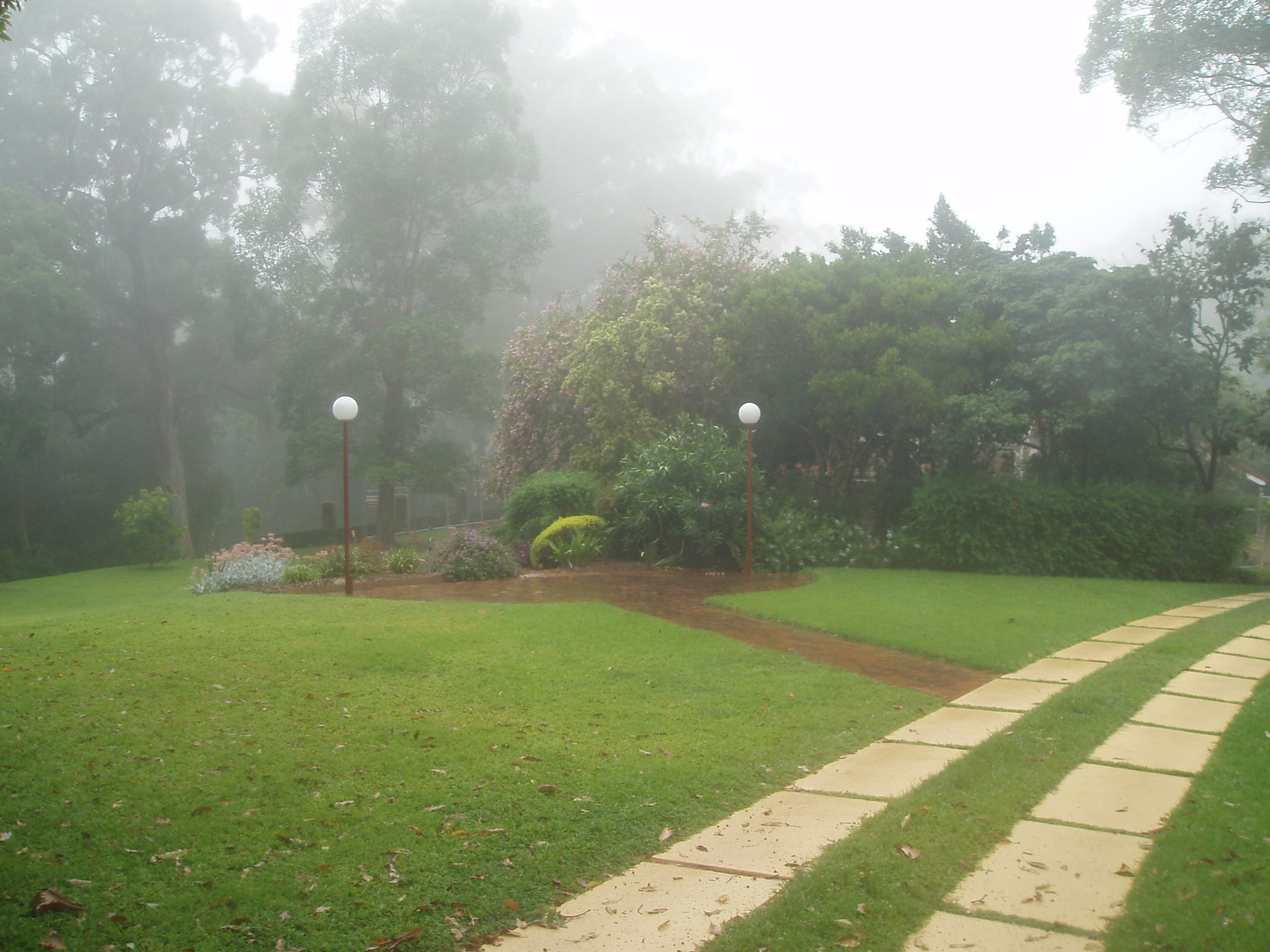
Boyce gardens – entrance and driveway.

Mount Lofty has one heritage-listed site:

- 6 Range Street (27.5469°S 151.9722°E): Boyce Gardens

== Education ==
Toowoomba State High School is a government secondary (7–12) school for boys and girls at Stuart Street (27.5452°S 151.9648°E). In 2018, the school had an enrolment of 832 students with 76 teachers (69 full-time equivalent) and 37 non-teaching staff (29 full-time equivalent). It includes a special education program.

There are no primary schools in Mount Lofty. The nearest government primary schools are Toowoomba East State School in neighbouring East Toowoomba to the south and Harlaxton State School in neighbouring Harlaxton to the west.

== Amenities ==
St David's Presbyterian Church is at 46 Mary Street (corner Alford Street, 27.5505°S 151.9685°E). It is part of the Presbyterian Church of Queensland.

There are a number of parks in the area:

- Bunya Park (27.5521°S 151.9722°E)
- Harvey Park (27.5420°S 151.9745°E)
- Mount Lofty Park (27.5440°S 151.9711°E)
- Prince Henry Drive Park (27.5491°S 151.9951°E)
- Warana Avenue Park (27.5460°S 151.9768°E)
- Woodward Park (27.5407°S 151.9677°E)

== Attractions ==
Mount Lofty Lookout is at the eastern end of North Street near the reservoir where Longview House once stood (27.5446°S 151.9719°E).
