= Toowoomba State High School =

Coordinates: 27°32′31.44″S 151°57′55.3″E

- Toowoomba, Queensland; Australia

Information
- Type: Public, co-educational, secondary day school
- Motto: Latin: Labore et Honore (Work and Honour)
- Established: 12 May 1919
- Principal: Therese Sippel, (2024–present)
- Enrolment: 800+ (7–12)
- Campus: Suburban
- Colours: Red, white and navy blue
- Website: Official website

Toowoomba State High School (TSHS) is a co-educational state high school located in Mount Lofty, Toowoomba, Queensland, Australia. TSHS was established in 1919. The school catered for approximately 840 students (2015) in years seven to twelve.

== History ==
The school was originally in Margaret Street, Toowoomba. Over two years in 1961–62, the school relocated to the suburb of Mount Lofty which is in the north-east corner of Toowoomba.

In 1998, the Wilsonton campus of Toowoomba State High School was established in the suburb of Wilsonton Heights which is in the north-west corner of Toowoomba. It was opened by then Education Minister, Bob Quinn. From 1998 to 2016 Toowoomba State High School consisted of two campuses, the Mount Lofty campus and the Wilsonton campus.

In 2016, it was decided the two campuses would become two separate schools.

In August 2016, a public survey was conducted in order to determine Wilsonton Campus' new name, uniform as well as sports logo for 2017 onwards. After the survey was conducted, it was decided that Wilsonton Campus would be renamed Wilsonton State High School. The sports polo shirt would be black, purple and green with a white trim and the sports logo would be a Pegasus.

The new Wilsonton State High School opened on the first school day in 2017 (23 January 2017). In 2017, a new $5 million hall was announced for the new Wilsonton school.

== The arts ==
T.S.H.S is well known for their excellence in The Arts. The school has bands, choirs and dance troupes. One of the well-known choirs at the school is the "Lofty Glee Choir". The choirs and bands perform at many school and public events.

== Sports ==
Toowoomba State High School is also keen on excellence in the sporting arena. Each year the school has their Swimming Carnival, Athletics Carnival and Cross Country.

== Notable alumni ==
- Michael Berkman, Greens MLA for the inner-Brisbane seat of Maiwar in the Queensland Legislative Assembly.
- John Alexander "Jack" French, V.C. Local Hero
- Owen Glyndwr (Glyn) Jenkins, Elected member of the Parliament of Victoria from 1970 to 1982
- Ian Leslie, television journalist and corporate communicator.
- James McGrath, Senator for Queensland (2014- )
- Glynis Nunn (née Saunders), Heptathlete
- Travis Passier, volleyball player. He competed for Australia at the 2012 Summer Olympics. Passier is a 6’9" middle blocker for the Australia men's national volleyball team.
- Greg Ritchie, Australian Cricketer
- Ellen Roberts, climate campaigner, named in Queensland's 100 most influential people in 2018
- Gary Spence, Qld State President of the Liberal National Party; managing director of Brown Consulting)
- Ian Stewart, Queensland Police Commissioner and Toowoomba State High School captain
- Derek Volker, senior public servant

== See also ==
- List of schools in Queensland
