= Gowrie Junction, Queensland =

Gowrie Junction Toowoomba, Queensland
- Coordinates: 27.5061°S 151.8816°E
- Population: 2,242 (2021 census)
  - Density: 85.90/km^{2} (222.5/sq mi)
- Postcode(s): 4352
- Area: 26.1 km^{2} (10.1 sq mi)
- Time zone: AEST (UTC+10:00)
- Location: 12.2 km (8 mi) NW of Toowoomba CBD; 135 km (84 mi) W of Brisbane
- LGA(s): Toowoomba Region
- State electorate(s): Condamine; Toowoomba North
- Federal division(s): Groom
Suburbs around Gowrie Junction:
Kingsthorpe	Cawdor	Highfields
Kingsthorpe	Gowrie Junction	Birnam
Charlton	Cotswold Hills	Cranley

Gowrie Junction is a rural locality in the Toowoomba Region, Queensland, Australia. It is north-west of Toowoomba. The town of Gowrie is in the eastern part of the locality (27.4994°S 151.8892°E). In the 2021 census, Gowrie Junction had a population of 2,242 people.

== Geography ==
The Toowoomba Second Range Crossing passes through the southern part of the locality with no intersections.

The Western railway line passes through the locality with the Gowrie railway station (27.4984°S 151.8889°E) serving the town of Gowrie. Tilgonda railway station is a closed railway station on the railway line in the west of the locality (27.4934°S 151.8490°E).

== History ==
The name Gowrie comes from the Gowrie pastoral station operated by Henry Hughes and Frederick N. Isaac who used the name from 1847. It is thought to be a corruption of an Aboriginal word cowarie which might refer either to Gowrie Creek or mean freshwater mussel. The name Junction relates to the former Gowrie Junction railway station which was the junction between the Southern and Western railway lines from 1871 to 1915. The railway station was subsequently renamed Gowrie railway station.

Gowrie Junction Post Office opened on 24 April 1876, was renamed Gowrie in 1961 and closed in 1972.

Gowrie Junction State School opened on 1 March 1878. On 2 April 1963, it was renamed Gowrie State School.

St John's Anglican Church was dedicated and consecrated on 9 July 1882 by Bishop Matthew Hale. Prior to this, Anglican services had been held in the home of George Downs, who was largely responsible for establishing the church. George King (owner of the Gowrie pastoral station) was one of its lay readers; his wife donated its organ. Its last service was held on 22 December 1968.

In January 1896, Mr John Fahy of the hotel called for tenders to erect a wooden hall in Gowrie Junction. It was in operation by July 1896.

In November 1898, the Gowrie Colliery established a public hall for the benefit of the community.

On Sunday 9 September 1900, Archbishop Robert Dunne opened and dedicated the Holy Family Catholic Church. It was destroyed in a storm in 1969.

== Demographics ==
In the 2011 census, Gowrie Junction had a population of 1,939 people.

In the 2016 census, Gowrie Junction had a population of 2,120 people.

In the 2021 census, Gowrie Junction had a population of 2,242 people.

== Education ==
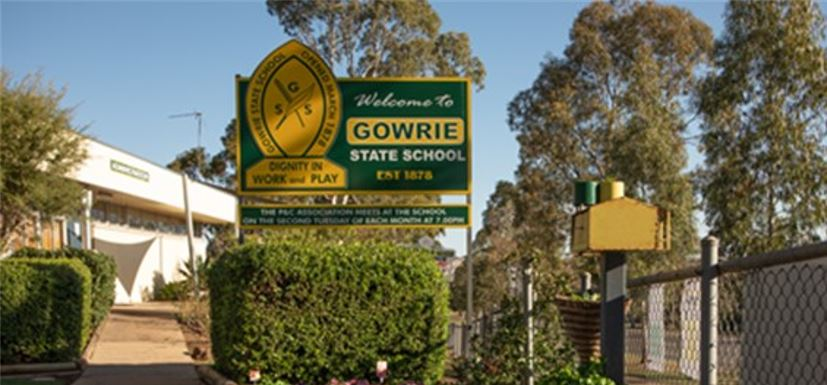
Gowrie State School, 2022

Gowrie State School is a government primary (Prep-6) school for boys and girls at 22 Old Homebush Road (27.4915°S 151.8914°E). In 2018, the school had an enrolment of 183 students with 15 teachers (11 full-time equivalent) and 14 non-teaching staff (8 full-time equivalent).

Other government primary schools in the local area are Kingsthorpe State School in Kingsthorpe to the west and Fairview Heights State School in Wilsonton.

There are no secondary schools in Gowrie Junction. The nearest government secondary schools are Highfields State Secondary College in Highfields to the north-east, Wilsonton State High School in Wilsonton Heights to the south-east, and Oakey State High School in Oakey to the west.

== Facilities ==
Gowrie Junction contains a small shop and a community hall. A shopping centre is also in the planning stages. The residents of Gowrie Junction funded and built the town recreational hall by themselves, largely through the efforts of the local progress association.

Library services in Gowrie Junction are provided by the Toowoomba Regional Council's mobile library service. The van visits Gowrie Junction State School every Thursday and Gowrie Junction Federation Hall every Saturday.

== Notable residents ==
Possibly Gowrie Junction's best known resident remains Frank Riethmuller, born in 1884 in Glenvale outside Toowoomba, who taught at Gowrie Junction's primary school from 1899 to 1905. He probably stayed with his newly married sister, Sophia, whose husband August Bischof had a farm at Gowrie Junction. Riethmuller went on to become a well-known rose breeder. He bred 'Carabella,' which is to be seen in country towns all round Australia. One of his pupils was a girl who became Sister Elizabeth Kenny, famous advocate of a non-chemical treatment of poliomyelitis.
