= Birnam, Queensland (Toowoomba Region) =

Birnam
- Suburb
- Interactive map of Birnam
- Coordinates: 27.4927°S 151.9241°E
- Country: Australia
- State: Queensland
- City: Toowoomba
- LGA: Toowoomba Region
- Location: 8.4 km (5.2 mi) N of Wilsonton Heights; 9.1 km (5.7 mi) SW of Highfields; 9.8 km (6.1 mi) N of Toowoomba CBD; 136 km (85 mi) W of Brisbane

Government
  - State electorate: Toowoomba North
  - Federal division: Groom

Area
  - Total: 3.9 km^{2} (1.5 sq mi)

Population
  - Total: 63 (2021 census)
  - Density: 16.2/km^{2} (41.8/sq mi)
- Time zone: UTC+10:00 (AEST)
- Postcode: 4352
Suburbs around Birnam
Cawdor	Highfields	Highfields
Gowrie Junction	Birnam	Highfields
Cranley	Cranley	Blue Mountain Heights; Mount Kynoch

Birnam is a rural locality in the Toowoomba Region, Queensland, Australia. In the 2021 census, Birnam had a population of 63 people.

== Geography ==
Birnam is situated north of Toowoomba, 9.8 kilometres (6 mi) from the central business district.

== History ==
The area is named after a railway station in the area, which was named after the village of Birnam in Scotland.

== Demographics ==
In the 2016 census, Birnam had a population of 65 people.

In the 2021 census, Birnam had a population of 63 people.

== Education ==
There are no schools in Birnam. The nearest government primary schools are Gowrie State School in neighbouring Gowrie Junction to the west and Highfields State School in neighbouring Highfields to the north-west. The nearest government secondary schools are Toowoomba State High School in Mount Lofty, Toowoomba, to the south-east, Highfields State Secondary College in Highfields, and Wilsonton State High School in Wilsonton Heights to the south.
