= Charlton, Queensland =

Charlton
- Suburb
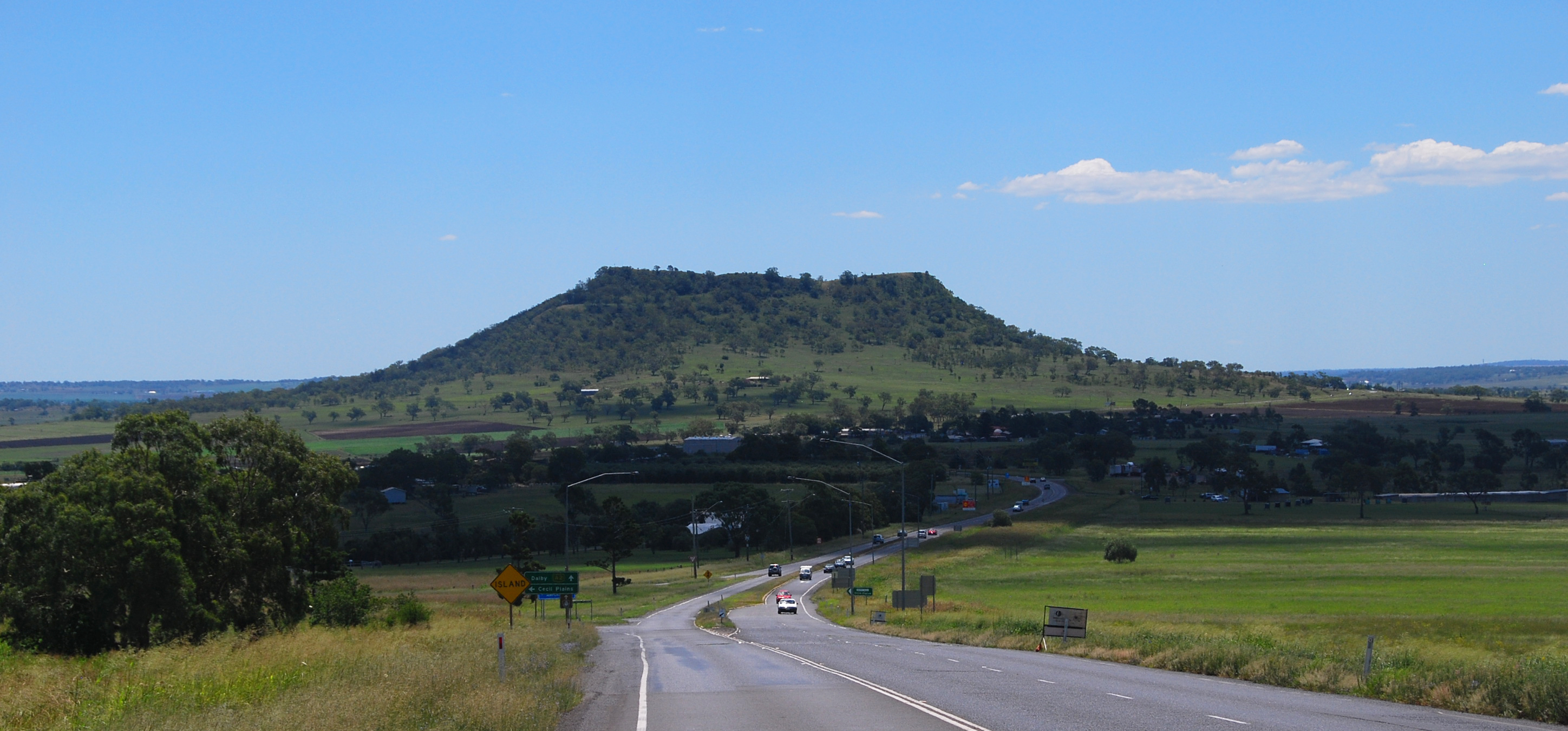
- Looking west along the Warrego Highway in Charlton towards Gowrie Mountain, 2015

- Interactive map of Charlton
- Coordinates: 27.5155°S 151.8486°E
- Country: Australia
- State: Queensland
- LGA: Toowoomba Region
- Location: 11.8 km (7.3 mi) WNW of Toowoomba CBD; 140 km (87 mi) W of Brisbane

Government
  - State electorate: Condamine
  - Federal division: Groom

Area
  - Total: 13.5 km^{2} (5.2 sq mi)

Population
  - Total: 107 (2021 census)
  - Density: 7.93/km^{2} (20.53/sq mi)
- Time zone: UTC+10:00 (AEST)
- Postcode: 4350
Suburbs around Charlton
Kingsthorpe	Gowrie Junction	Gowrie Junction
Gowrie Mountain	Charlton	Cotswold Hills
Wellcamp	Wellcamp	Torrington

Charlton is a rural locality in the Toowoomba Region, Queensland, Australia, located 13 kilometres (8 mi) west from the Toowoomba city centre off the Warrego Highway. In the 2021 census, Charlton had a population of 107 people.

== Geography ==
The Western railway line marks the northern boundary of the locality, while the southern boundary roughly follows Dry Creek. The higher of the two peaks of Gowrie Mountain (674 metres above sea level) is in the far west of the locality while the second lower peak (630 metres (2,070 ft) above sea level) is in the neighbouring locality of Gowrie Mountain.

The Warrego Highway passes through Charlton, with an intersection of the following road segments in the locality. To the north-east the Warrego Highway is now part of the Toowoomba Bypass, while to the east is the former Warrego Highway alignment, now known as the Toowoomba Connection Road (A21). To the south-west is the new portion of the Gore Highway (part of the Toowoomba Bypass. To the north-west is the unchanged portion of the Warrego Highway.

== History ==
Gowrie Estate Provisional School opened on 4 July 1898, becoming Gowrie Estate State School on 1 January 1909. In November 1915, it was renamed Charlton State School. It was located at 10834 Warrego Highway (27.5186°S 151.8475°E). As at 2010, it had an enrolment of 40 children, organised into two classes (Prep-Year 3 and Years 4–7) with 6 teachers (3 full-time equivalent) and 5 non-teaching staff (2 full-time equivalent). It closed on 31 December 2013. The school's website has been archived.

== Demographics ==
In the 2016 census, Charlton had a population of 120 people.

In the 2021 census, Charlton had a population of 107 people.

== Education ==
There are no schools in Charlton. The nearest government primary schools are Kingsthorpe State School in neighbouring Kingsthorpe to the north-west, Gowrie State School in neighbouring Gowrie Junction to the north-east, Fairview Heights State School in Wilsonton to the south-east, and Wellcamp State School in neighbouring Wellcamp to the south. The nearest government secondary school is Wilsonton State High School in Wilsonton Heights to the east.
