= Torrington, Queensland =

Torrington
- Suburb
- Interactive map of Torrington
- Coordinates: 27.5383°S 151.885°E
- Country: Australia
- State: Queensland
- City: Toowoomba
- LGA: Toowoomba Region
- Location: 6.4 km (4.0 mi) WNW of Toowoomba CBD; 138 km (86 mi) W of Brisbane

Government
  - State electorate: Condamine
  - Federal division: Groom

Area
  - Total: 7.8 km^{2} (3.0 sq mi)

Population
  - Total: 1,070 (2021 census)
  - Density: 137.2/km^{2} (355/sq mi)
- Time zone: UTC+10:00 (AEST)
- Postcode: 4350
Suburbs around Torrington
Charlton	Cotswold Hills	Wilsonton
Wellcamp	Torrington	Wilsonton
Wellcamp	Glenvale	Glenvale

Torrington is a rural locality in Toowoomba in the Toowoomba Region, Queensland, Australia. In the 2021 census, Torrington had a population of 1,070 people.

== Geography ==
Torrington is located 7 kilometres (4 mi) west of the Toowoomba city centre off the Warrego Highway.

A significant industrial area serving the Toowoomba region is located along the suburb's eastern boundary on Boundary Road.

== History ==
Torrington was in the Shire of Jondaryan until the amalgamation in 2008 that created the Toowoomba Region.

== Demographics ==
In the 2016 census, Torrington had a population of 879 people.

In the 2021 census, Torrington had a population of 1,070 people.

== Education ==
There are no schools in Torrington. The nearest government primary schools are Fairview Heights State School in neighbouring Wilsonton to the north-west, Glenvale State School in neighbouring Glenvale to the south-east, and Wellcamp State School in neighbouring Wellcamp to the south-west. The nearest government secondary school is Wilsonton State High School in Wilsonton Heights.

== Facilities ==
Fairview Ambulance Station is at 445 Bridge Street (27.5352°S 151.9029°E).
