= Royal Toowoomba Show =

- Also called: The Show
- Observed by: Toowoomba
- Type: northern public holiday
- Significance: Royal Agricultural Society of Queensland
- Celebrations: Agricultural displays, sideshows, fashion parades
- Date: Friday through to Sunday
- 2025 date: 20–23 March
- Frequency: annual

The Royal Toowoomba Show is an annual agricultural show held at the Toowoomba Showgrounds in Toowoomba on the Darling Downs, Queensland, Australia. The first Toowoomba Show was held in July 1862.

The Royal Toowoomba Show is principally an agricultural event which focuses on the primary industries of Queensland, and rural lifestyle of many Queenslanders with events such as livestock judging, equestrian events, animal breeders competitions, produce competitions and wood chopping, although it also incorporates live entertainment, sporting events, food tasting, and fashion shows. A popular feature of the show is the sideshows which feature showrides, foodstalls, games of skill, and showbag stalls.

Like its counterpart, the Ekka in Brisbane, over recent years the event has shifted towards more of a carnival atmosphere than its previously more farming focus.

The show currently runs for three days, Friday through Sunday, in March or April (around the Sydney Royal Easter Show). The Friday is a public holiday, known as Show Day. The Saturday is known as family day and usually involves many discounts and savings on showbags and rides from the other days.

There was no event in 1918, 1943–45 nor 2020.
