= Cotswold Hills, Queensland =

Cotswold Hills
- Suburb
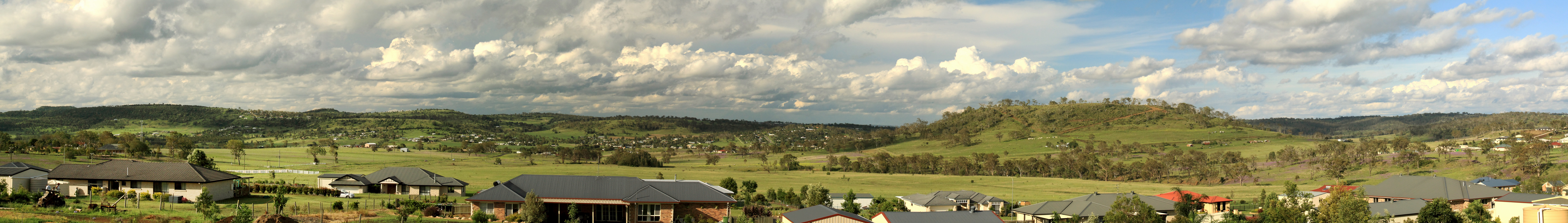
- Cotswold Hills panorama, 2008

- Interactive map of Cotswold Hills
- Coordinates: 27.5227°S 151.8930°E
- Country: Australia
- State: Queensland
- City: Toowoomba
- LGA: Toowoomba Region
- Location: 8.1 km (5.0 mi) NW of Toowoomba CBD; 135 km (84 mi) W of Brisbane

Government
  - State electorate: Condamine
  - Federal division: Groom

Area
  - Total: 5.8 km^{2} (2.2 sq mi)

Population
  - Total: 1,620 (2021 census)
  - Density: 279/km^{2} (723/sq mi)
- Time zone: UTC+10:00 (AEST)
- Postcode: 4350
Suburbs around Cotswold Hills
Gowrie Junction	Gowrie Junction	Cranley
Gowrie Junction	Cotswold Hills	Cranley
Charlton	Torrington	Wilsonton

Cotswold Hills is a rural-residential locality within Toowoomba in the Toowoomba Region, Queensland, Australia. In the 2021 census, Cotswold Hills had a population of 1,620 people.

== Geography ==
Cotswold Hill is located 8.1 kilometres (5 mi) by road north-west of the city centre off Warrego Highway. It is a rural-residential area with homes on small acreages.

It is bounded to the north by Holmes Road, to the east by Boundary Street, to the south by Bridge Street and the Toowoomba Connection Road, and to the west (partly) by Gowrie Junction Road.by Holmes Road

The Toowoomba Second Range Crossing (Warrego Highway) passes through the north-western corner of the locality (27.5125°S 151.88988°E) with no intersections within the locality.

== History ==
Cotswold Hills was formally named in 2000; the origin of the name is unknown.

Cotswold Hills was in the Shire of Jondaryan until the amalgamation in 2008 that created the Toowoomba Region.

== Demographics ==
In the 2016 census, Cotswold Hills had a population of 1,278 people.

In the 2021 census, Cotswold Hills had a population of 1,620 people.

== Education ==
There are no schools in Cotswold Hills. The nearest government primary schools are Fairview Heights State School in neighbouring Wilsonton to the south-east and Gowrie State School in neighbouring Gowrie Junction to the north. The nearest government secondary school is Wilsonton State High School in Wilsonton Heights to the south-east.

== Amenities ==
John Trousdell Park is 11.77-hectare (29.1-acre) recreation area in Hamzah Drive (27.5243°S 151.8936°E). It has a children's playground, barbeque and picnic facilities, and a court for basketball and tennis. It has a bushland trail for walkers and cyclists. It is managed by the Toowoomba Regional Council.
