= Rockville, Queensland =

Rockville
- Suburb
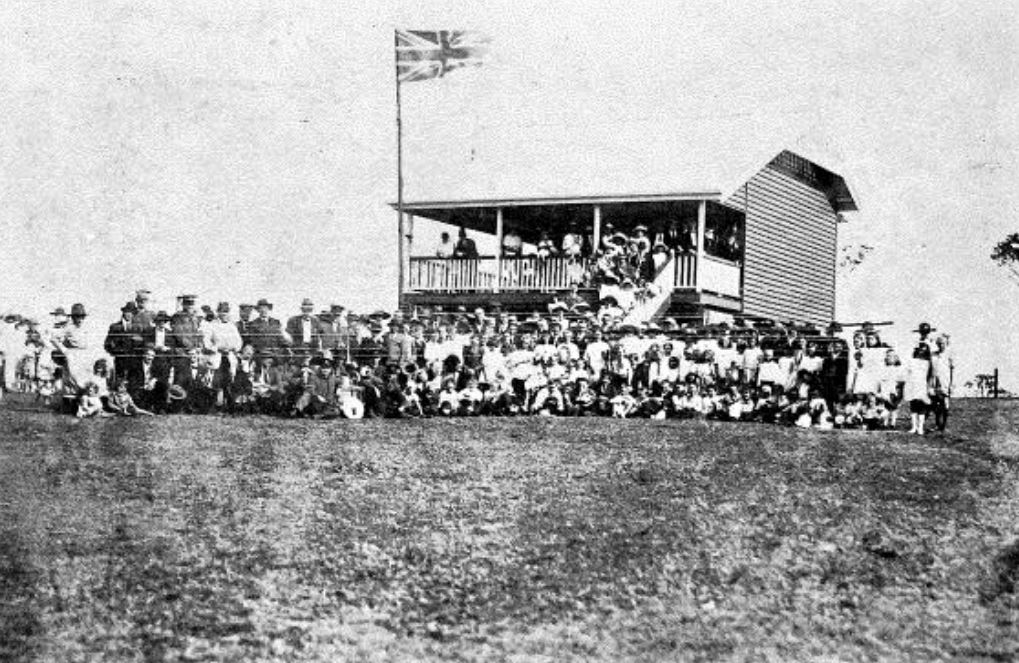
- Rockville State School

- Interactive map of Rockville
- Coordinates: 27.5358°S 151.9386°E
- Country: Australia
- State: Queensland
- City: Toowoomba
- LGA: Toowoomba Region
- Location: 3.5 km (2.2 mi) NW of Toowoomba CBD; 133 km (83 mi) W of Brisbane

Government
  - State electorate: Toowoomba North
  - Federal division: Groom

Area
  - Total: 1.9 km^{2} (0.73 sq mi)

Population
  - Total: 3,204 (2021 census)
  - Density: 1,690/km^{2} (4,370/sq mi)
- Time zone: UTC+10:00 (AEST)
- Postcode: 4350
Suburbs around Rockville
Cranley	Cranley	Harlaxton
Wilsonton Heights	Rockville	Harlaxton
Wilsonton	Newtown	North Toowoomba

Rockville is a residential locality in the Toowoomba Region, Queensland, Australia. In the 2021 census, Rockville had a population of 3,204 people.

== Geography ==
Rockville is located 4 kilometres (2 mi) north-west of the city centre.

The eastern edge of the suburb is home to an industrial area. Leslie Research Centre is within its boundaries.

== History ==
Rockville State School opened on 1 November 1922. The school celebrated its centenary on Saturday 12 November 2022.

On 9 July 1966, the Presbyterian Church opened St Andrews Toowoomba Hospital. It was a 42-bed private hospital with two operating theatres.

Rockville was named after Rockville Estate, consisting of 114 allotments in the area ranging from 2,000 square metres (22,000 sq ft) to 20,000 square metres (220,000 sq ft), which itself was named after Rockville House. The suburb was officially named in 1981.

== Demographics ==
In the 2006 census, Rockville was among the most socio-economically disadvantaged suburbs of Toowoomba with residents having a median individual income of $388, compared with $448 for the Toowoomba statistical district, and a median family income of $921 compared to $1,116. The suburb had a SEIFA score of 908, placing it below all other suburbs in the district except Harlaxton.

In the 2016 census, Rockville had a population of 3,237 people.

In the 2021 census, Rockville had a population of 3,204 people.

== Education ==
Rockville State School is a government primary (Prep–6) school for boys and girls at 3 Holberton Street (27.5311°S 151.9364°E). It includes a special education program. In 2017, the school had an enrolment of 175 students with 16 teachers (13 full-time equivalent) and 14 non-teaching staff (10 full-time equivalent). In 2018, the school had an enrolment of 217 students with 18 teachers (15 full-time equivalent) and 16 non-teaching staff (10 full-time equivalent).

There are no secondary schools in Rockville. The nearest government secondary school is Wilsonton State High School in neighbouring Wilsonton Heights to the west.

== Amenities ==
St Andrews Toowoomba Hospital is a private hospital at 280 North Street (27.5400°S 151.9344°E).

There are a number of parks in the area:

- Black Gully Reserve (27.5424°S 151.9405°E)
- Bushnell Court Park (27.5325°S 151.9415°E)
- Clearview Street Park (27.5446°S 151.9347°E)
- Doherty Street Park (27.5382°S 151.9345°E)
- Esmond Street Park (27.5320°S 151.9389°E)
- Fair Street Park (27.5299°S 151.9422°E)
- Ford Street Park (27.5392°S 151.9397°E)
- Vanity Street Park (27.5366°S 151.9402°E)
