= Glenvale, Queensland =

Glenvale
- Suburb
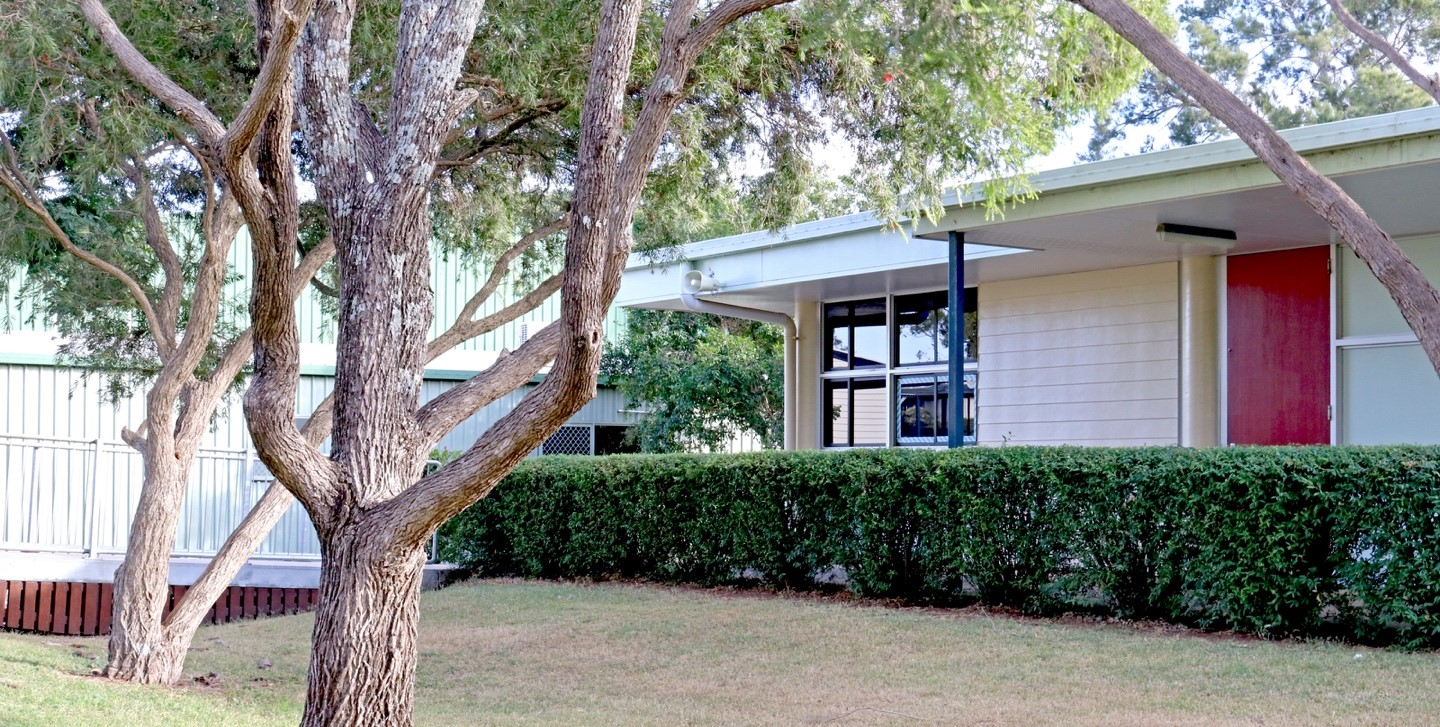
- Glenvale State School, 2025

- Interactive map of Glenvale
- Coordinates: 27.5688°S 151.9069°E
- Country: Australia
- State: Queensland
- City: Toowoomba
- LGA: Toowoomba Region
- Location: 7.5 km (4.7 mi) W of Toowoomba CBD; 132 km (82 mi) W of Brisbane

Government
  - State electorates: Condamine; Toowoomba South
  - Federal division: Groom

Area
  - Total: 14.6 km^{2} (5.6 sq mi)

Population
  - Total: 8,120 (2021 census)
  - Density: 556.2/km^{2} (1,440/sq mi)
- Time zone: UTC+10:00 (AEST)
- Postcode: 4350
Suburbs around Glenvale
Wellcamp	Torrington	Wilsonton
Wellcamp	Glenvale	Newtown
Westbrook	Drayton	Harristown

Glenvale is a semi-rural residential locality in the Toowoomba Region, Queensland, Australia. It is a suburb of Toowoomba. In the 2021 census, Glenvale had a population of 8,120 people.

== Geography ==
The Toowoomba Showgrounds are at the western end of Glenvale Road (27.5596°S 151.8828°E).

== History ==
The area was first settled in the mid-nineteenth century for the purposes of farming and grazing.

Glenvale State School opened on 18 July 1882. The original school building remains in use as the Resource Centre.

On Sunday 3 April 1955, the Glenvale Presbyterian Church Hall was officially opened by the Right Reverend Rowellyn Ramsay, the Queensland Presbyterian Moderator.

The Toowoomba Christian Parent Controlled Day School Association was established in 1991 to establish a school based on Christian values as there was a shortage of places in the existing church schools in the Toowoomba area. The association opened Glenvale Christian School on 28 January 1997 in the Toowoomba Christian Reformed Church. On 19 October 2001 the current site was purchased and construction commenced in March 2003.

The Royal Agricultural Society of Queensland's Toowoomba Show has been held on the 245-acre (99 ha) showground at Glenvale since 1985. The first Toowoomba Show was held in July 1862, making it the longest-running agricultural show in Queensland. The showground was moved from the corner of Bridge and Mary Streets near the Queens Park reserve and City Botanic Gardens. Motivations for the move included lack of space, the need to rebuild run-down infrastructure, lack of space for camping and parking, and noise complaints from nearby residents.

From the early 1990s onwards, Glenvale experienced rapid residential development.

Circa July 2017, the Lifeworks Uniting Church opened in Glenvale, being a merger of three former Uniting Church congregations: Newtown, Scots and Westbrook.

At the start of 2001, the Darling Downs Christian School relocated to Glenvale to accommodate the growing number of students.

== Demographics ==
In the 2016 census, Glenvale had a population of 6,353 people.

In the 2021 census, Glenvale had a population of 8,120 people.

== Education ==
Glenvale State School is a government primary (Prep–6) school for boys and girls at 224 Glenvale Road (27.5625°S 151.9028°E). In 2018, the school had an enrolment of 761 students with 50 teachers (47 full-time equivalent) and 34 non-teaching staff (22 full-time equivalent). It includes a special education program.

Glenvale Christian School is a private primary (Prep–6) school for boys and girls at 623–661 Boundary Street (27.5610°S 151.9000°E). In 2018, the school had an enrolment of 103 students with 8 teachers (7 full-time equivalent) and 10 non-teaching staff (5 full-time equivalent). It is operated by the Toowoomba Christian Parent Controlled Day School Association Inc.

Darling Downs Christian School is a private primary and secondary (Kindergarten–12) school on a 35-acre (14 ha) campus at 441–459 Mcdougall Street (27.5687°S 151.9051°E). The school is operated by Seventh-day Adventist Schools (South Queensland) Ltd. In 2020, the school had an enrolment of 197 students with 24 teachers (11 full-time equivalent) and 11 non-teaching staff.

The nearest government secondary schools are Harristown State High School in neighbouring Harristown to the east and Wilsonton State High School in Wilsonton Heights to the north-west.

== Amenities ==
The Lifeworks Uniting Church is at 615 Boundary Street (27.5585°S 151.9004°E). It is part of the Presbytery of The Downs in the Uniting Church in Australia. Services in Brazilian Portuguese are also held in this church.

Toowoomba Chinese Wesleyan Methodist Church is at 21 Kookaburra Court (27.5691°S 151.8924°E). It is part of the Wesleyan Methodist Church of Australia.

== Toowoomba Showgrounds ==
The Royal Agricultural Society of Queensland moved their offices from the old Toowoomba Showgrounds off Campbell Road, to the 245 acre purpose built Toowoomba Showgrounds at Glenvale, in 1985. The new showground includes large carparks, camping facilities, many buildings, a variety of function rooms and several large roofed spaces including the Cattle Pavilions and State Equestrian Centre. These facilities can be hired. The extensive facilities at the Showgrounds make up the Clive Berghofer Events Centre, named for local property developer and philanthropist, past Toowoomba Mayor & Member of State Parliament, Clive Berghofer.

== Events ==
The annual agricultural show, the Toowoomba Show, is held at the showgrounds in March every year.

== Public transport ==
Public transport in Glenvale is limited, with the sole service to and from the Toowoomba CBD being City Bus Route 902 via Clifford Gardens between approximately 07:40 and 18:00 from Monday to Friday, And 08:40 to 16:35 on Saturday.
