= Cranley, Queensland =

Cranley Toowoomba, Queensland
- Coordinates: 27.5122°S 151.9261°E
- Population: 2,281 (2021 census)
  - Density: 221.5/km^{2} (573.6/sq mi)
- Postcode(s): 4350
- Area: 10.3 km^{2} (4.0 sq mi)
- Time zone: AEST (UTC+10:00)
- Location: 6.9 km (4 mi) NW of Toowoomba CBD; 130 km (81 mi) W of Brisbane
- LGA(s): Toowoomba Region
- State electorate(s): Toowoomba North
- Federal division(s): Groom
Suburbs around Cranley:
Gowrie Junction	Birnam	Mount Kynoch
Gowrie Junction	Cranley	Harlaxton
Cotswold Hills	Wilsonton; Wilsonton Heights	Rockville

Cranley is a rural locality in the Toowoomba Region, Queensland, Australia. In the 2021 census, Cranley had a population of 2,281 people.

== Geography ==
Cranley is located 6 kilometres (4 mi) north-west from the Toowoomba central business district. Its northern and eastern boundary approximately follow Gowrie Creek. Its western boundary is Boundary Road.

Most of the land is small farms and very low-density rural residential. Exceptions to this are in the southern part of the locality and include the Baillie Henderson Hospital, which provides mental health services in the Darling Downs region, a waste water treatment plant, and the Palm Lake Resort retirement village.

There are a number of closed railway stations through Cranley, all on the Southern and Western railway lines:

- Pengarry railway station (27.4955°S 151.9211°E)
- Wetalla railway station (27.5013°S 151.9247°E) at the intersection of Willims Road and Bedford Street
- Cranley railway station (27.5181°S 151.9417°E)

== History ==
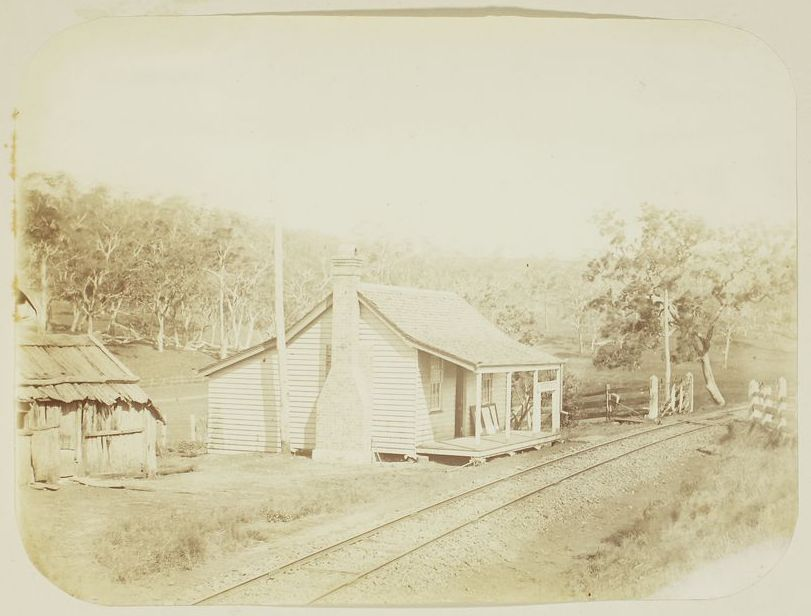
Cranley (formerly Bremmers Gate) on the railway line from Toowoomba to Warwick, 1897.jpg

Cranley railway station on the Southern railway line from Toowoomba to Warwick was established in the 1870s and named after James Cranley, a landholder and farmer in the district. James Cranley was a Toowoomba municipal councillor from 1864 to 1866. He was born in County Tipperary, Ireland around 1811 and died in Toowoomba on 3 July 1890. He immigrated to Moreton Bay with his family on the John Fielden in June 1853 and spent several years working at Corranga and Jimbour Station on the Darling Downs before settling in Toowoomba district around 1857.

In 2016 construction began on the Toowoomba Second Range Crossing, which was opened in 2019 as the new route for the Warrego Highway. An interchange has been built at the end of Mort Street to provide a new northern entry into central Toowoomba. Due to traffic being diverted from the inner city, it is likely that businesses will open around Cranley to cater for traffic using the bypass. This interchange enables traffic to change between the Warrego Highway and the New England Highway without entering the Toowoomba CBD.

== Demographics ==
In the 2006 census, Cranley had a population of 724 people.

In the 2011 census, Cranley had a population of 852 people.

In the 2016 census, Cranley had a population of 1,446 people.

In the 2021 census, Cranley had a population of 2,281 people.

== Education ==
There are no schools in Cranley. The nearest government primary schools are:

- Rockville State School in neighbouring Rockville to the south-east
- Fairview Heights State School in neighbouring Wilsonton to the south
- Gowrie State School in neighbouring Gowrie Junction to the north-west
- Harlaxton State School in neighbouring Harlaxton to the south-east

The nearest government secondary schools are Wilsonton State High School in neighbouring Wilsonton Heights to the south and Toowoomba State High School in Mount Lofty to the south-east.

== Heritage listings ==
Heritage-listed sites in Cranley include:

- Baillie Henderson Hospital, 1 Hogg Street (27.5248°S 151.9378°E)
