= Toomba Shin Ramyun =

Ramen flavor by Nongshim

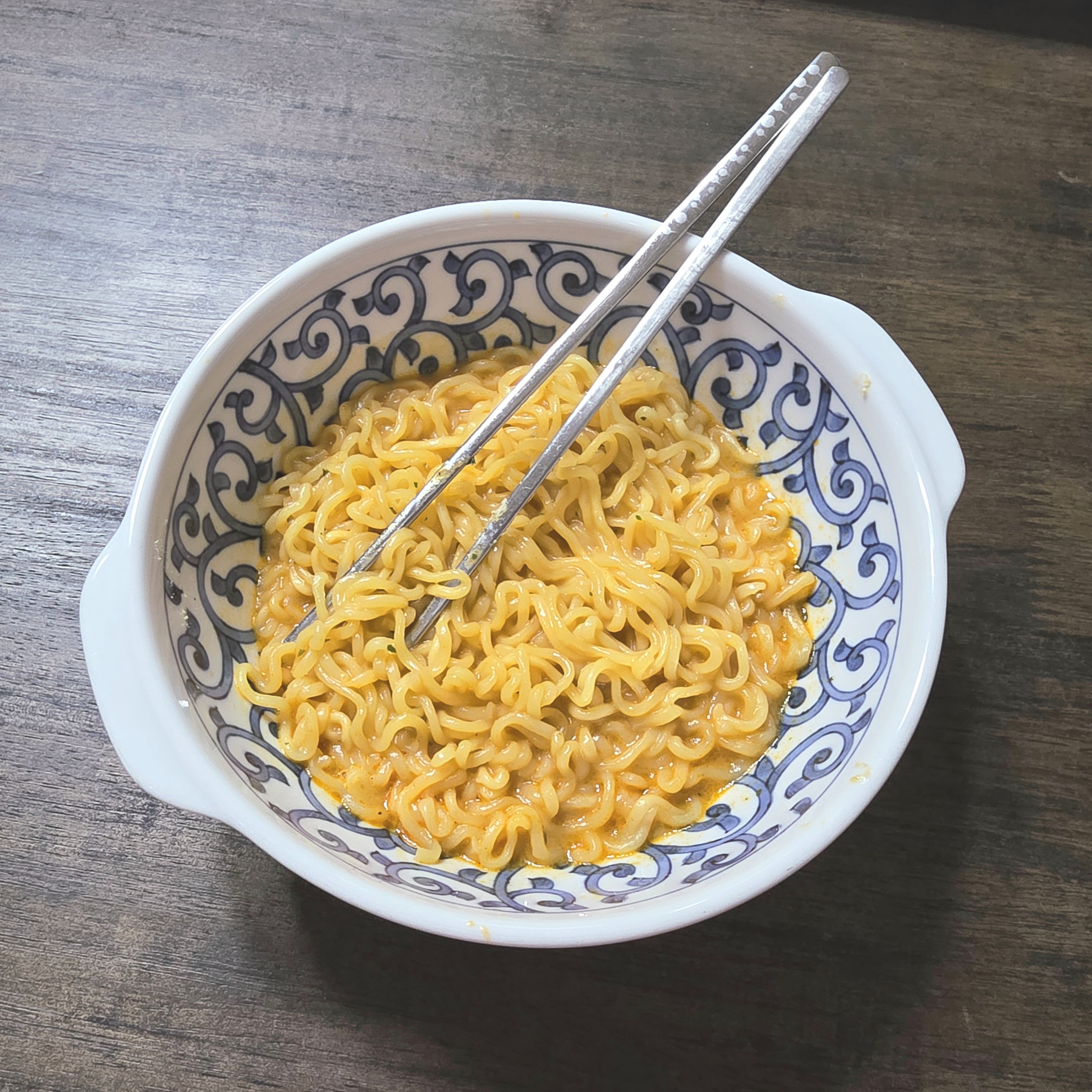

Toomba Ramyun is a Shin Ramyun flavor launched by South Korean food conglomerate Nongshim in September 2024. The ramyun adds whipped cream, cheddar cheese, and Parmesan cheese, as well as toppings like mushrooms, garlic to the classic Shin Ramyun recipe.

== History ==
The recipe is based on an viral modification to the Shin Ramyun, in which extras like milk, cheese, shrimp, and bacon are added. The resulting product is said to resemble "Toowoomba Pastas" served at Outback Steakhouse chains in South Korea.

This "modisumer" trend was popularized by social media. A 2023 survey by Nongshim revealed 60% of people in their 10s and 20s has heard of or tried the modified recipe.

The flavor was released in September 2024 in cup format only, with bag format following three weeks later. In three months, 17 million servings were sold.

Nongshim began manufacturing the ramyun in US factories in November 2024, and in Chinese factories in March 2025.

In April 2025, Nongshim shipped first million servings to Japan. Distributed by convenience store 7-Eleven, the flavor sold out in two weeks. Expanding globally, Toomba ramyun is sold in more than sixty countries, including through major retailers such as Woolworths in Australia, Walmart in the United States, where it is offered in square containers, Costco in Los Angeles in May, and distributors in Malaysia. It is set to be sold at U.S. supermarket chain Kroger starting in November.

The launch came at a time in which Nongshim faced a downturn in profits. Korea Investment & Securities forecasts that, driven by the strong performance of Toomba ramyuns, Nongshim's U.S. subsidiary sales will reach 669 billion KRW in 2025, a 7.4 percent increase from last year's 623 billion KRW.

== Marketing ==
A native advertisement, the ramyun was featured in an episode of South Korean Netflix series Culinary Class Wars, in which Edward Lee explored various ways to prepare and modify the ramyun.

In 2025 October, as part of "Nongshim Myeonga 60" initiative, the Michelin-list restaurant Perigee (페리지) presented a pasta dish utilizing Toomba ramyuns.

== Reception ==
Sporked gave the ramyun a 9/10 rating, stating "the noodles are bouncy, the sauce packet is garlicky and umami, and the powder is spicy and cheesy," and drew comparisons to the Samyang Food’s Buldak carbonara ramen.
