= Wilsonton, Queensland =

Wilsonton
- Suburb
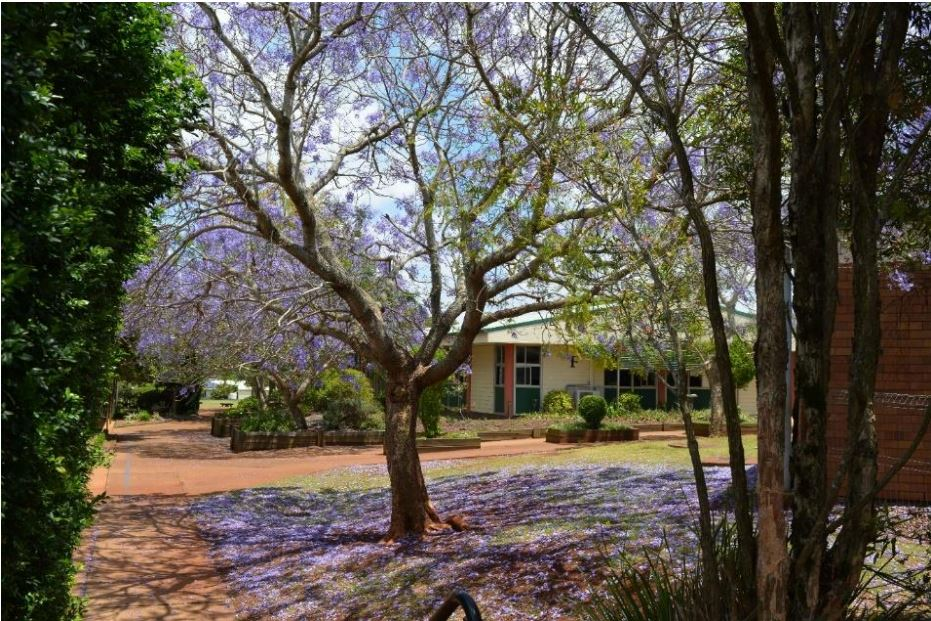
- Fairview Heights State School, 2018

- Interactive map of Wilsonton
- Coordinates: 27.5413°S 151.9172°E
- Country: Australia
- State: Queensland
- City: Toowoomba
- LGA: Toowoomba Region
- Location: 5.9 km (3.7 mi) NW of Toowoomba CBD; 136 km (85 mi) W of Brisbane
- Established: 1880s

Government
  - State electorate: Toowoomba North
  - Federal division: Groom

Area
  - Total: 5.3 km^{2} (2.0 sq mi)

Population
  - Total: 5,891 (2021 census)
  - Density: 1,112/km^{2} (2,879/sq mi)
- Time zone: UTC+10:00 (AEST)
- Postcode: 4350
Suburbs around Wilsonton
Cotswold Hills	Cranley	Wilsonton Heights
Torrington	Wilsonton	Rockville
Torrington	Glenvale	Newtown

Wilsonton is an urban locality in the Toowoomba Region, Queensland, Australia. In the 2021 census, Wilsonton had a population of 5,891 people.

== Geography ==
Wilsonton is located 5.9 kilometres (4 mi) by road north-west of the Toowoomba central business district.

Toowoomba City Aerodrome is the centre of the suburb, accessed via Mutze Street (27.5432°S 151.9150°E).

The suburb contains an industrial area in the south-west corner delimited by Taylor Street and Boundary Street.

== History ==
The suburb, officially named in 1981, is believed to honour James T. Wilson, an 1870s businessman and supporter of the Toowoomba Agricultural Society. The suburb's boundaries were amended in 2006 after the gazettal of Wilsonton Heights as a separate suburb.

Wilsonton State School opened on 5 February 1894.

Sacred Heart Catholic Primary School opened on 12 February 1968.

Fairview Heights State School opened on 30 January 1995.

== Demographics ==
In the 2016 census, Wilsonton had a population of 5,955 people.

In the 2021 census, Wilsonton had a population of 5,891 people.

== Education ==
Wilsonton State School is a government primary (Prep–6) school for boys and girls at 429 Bridge Street (27.5429°S 151.9221°E). In 2018, the school had an enrolment of 530 students with 53 teachers (44 full-time equivalent) and 41 non-teaching staff (28 full-time equivalent). It includes a special education program.

Fairview Heights State School is a government primary (Prep–6) school for boys and girls at 75 McDougall Street (27.5350°S 151.9115°E). In 2018, the school had an enrolment of 567 students with 43 teachers (37 full-time equivalent) and 26 non-teaching staff (17 full-time equivalent). It includes a special education program.

Sacred Heart Primary School is a Catholic primary (Prep–6) school for boys and girls at 263 Tor Street (27.5402°S 151.9314°E). In 2018, the school had an enrolment of 221 students with 17 teachers (13 full-time equivalent) and 16 non-teaching staff (9 full-time equivalent).

There are no secondary schools in Wilsonton. The nearest government secondary school is Wilsonton State High School in neighbouring Wilsonton Heights to the north-east.

== Amenities ==
There are a number of parks in the area:

- Airport Estate Park (27.5374°S 151.9166°E)
- Armstrong Street Park (27.5370°S 151.9103°E)
- Barlow Street Park (27.5320°S 151.9189°E)
- Catalina Drive Park (27.5321°S 151.9141°E)
- Freighter Avenue Park (27.5377°S 151.9091°E)
- Industrial Park (27.5443°S 151.9096°E)
- Vann Street Park (27.5461°S 151.9198°E)
