= Toowoomba =

- City
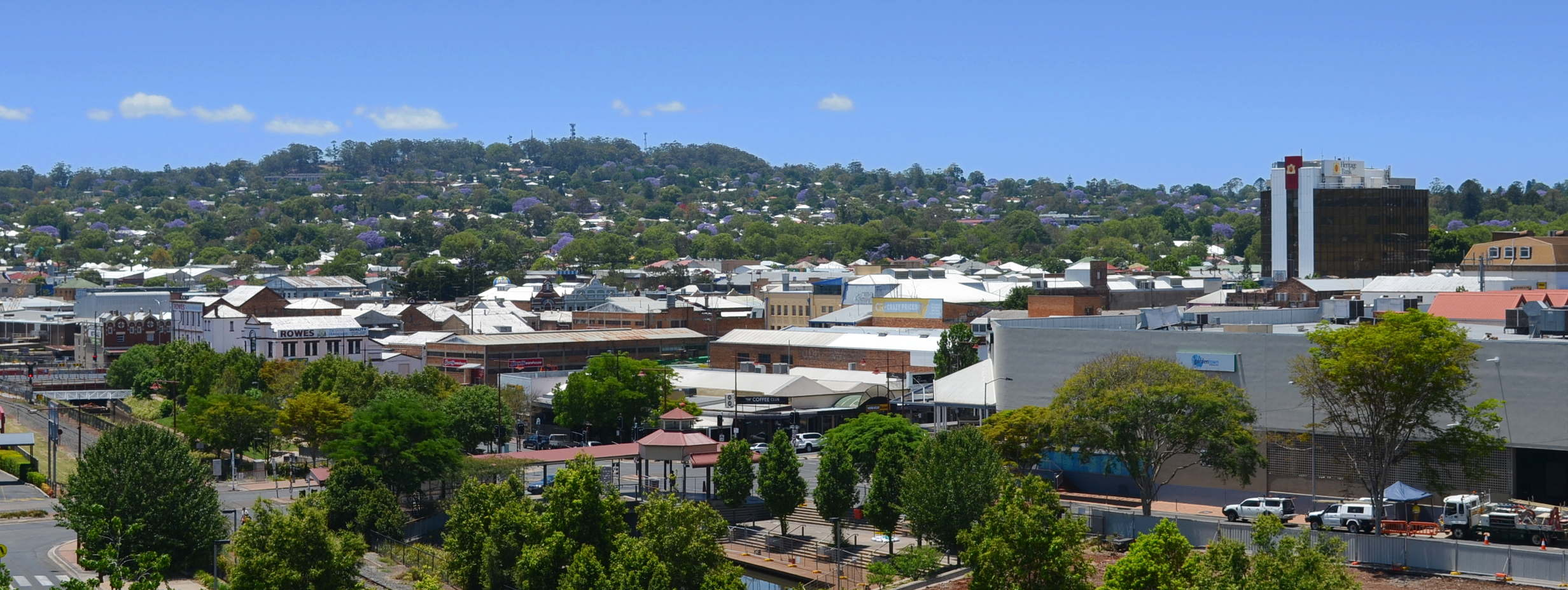
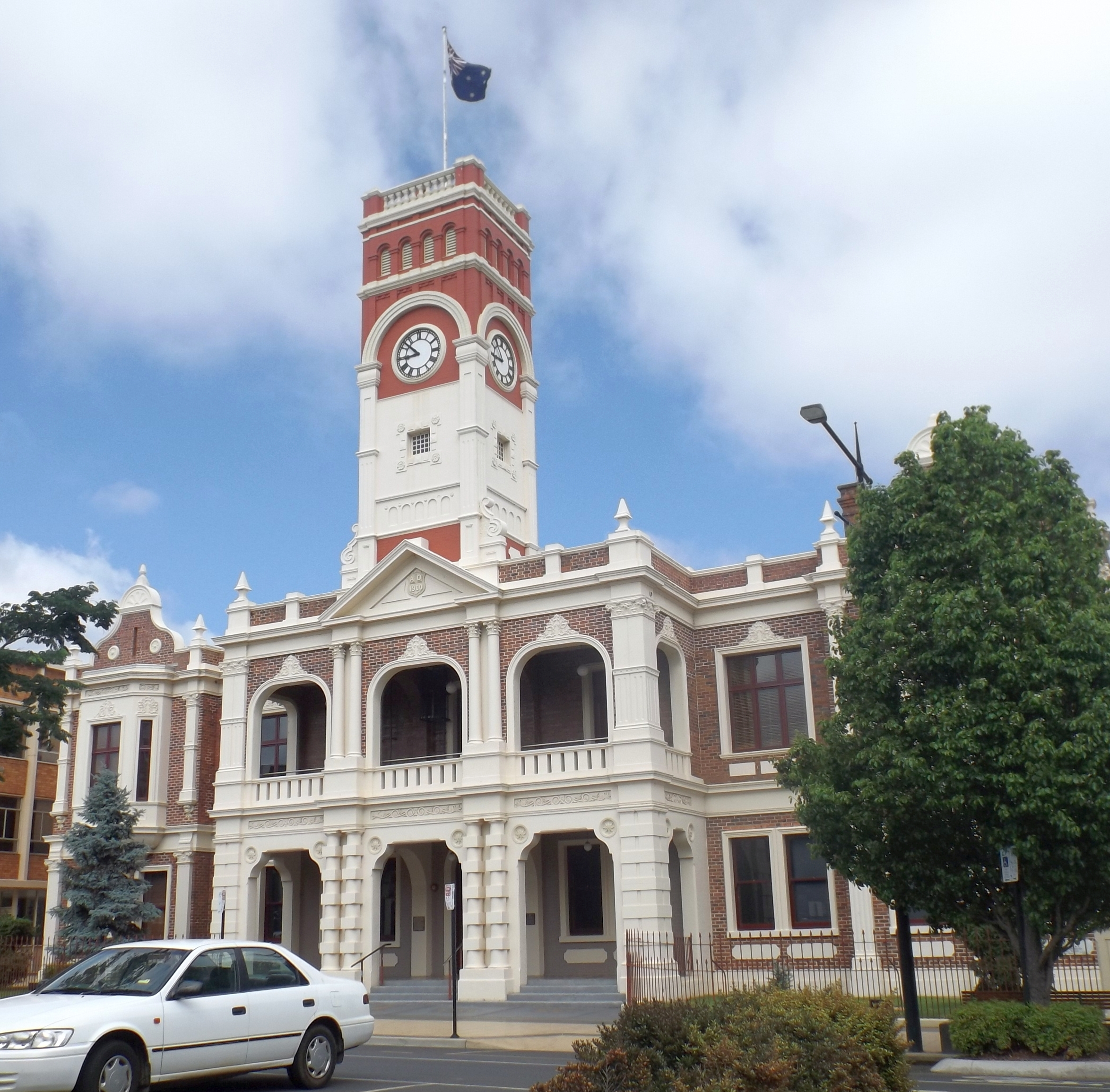
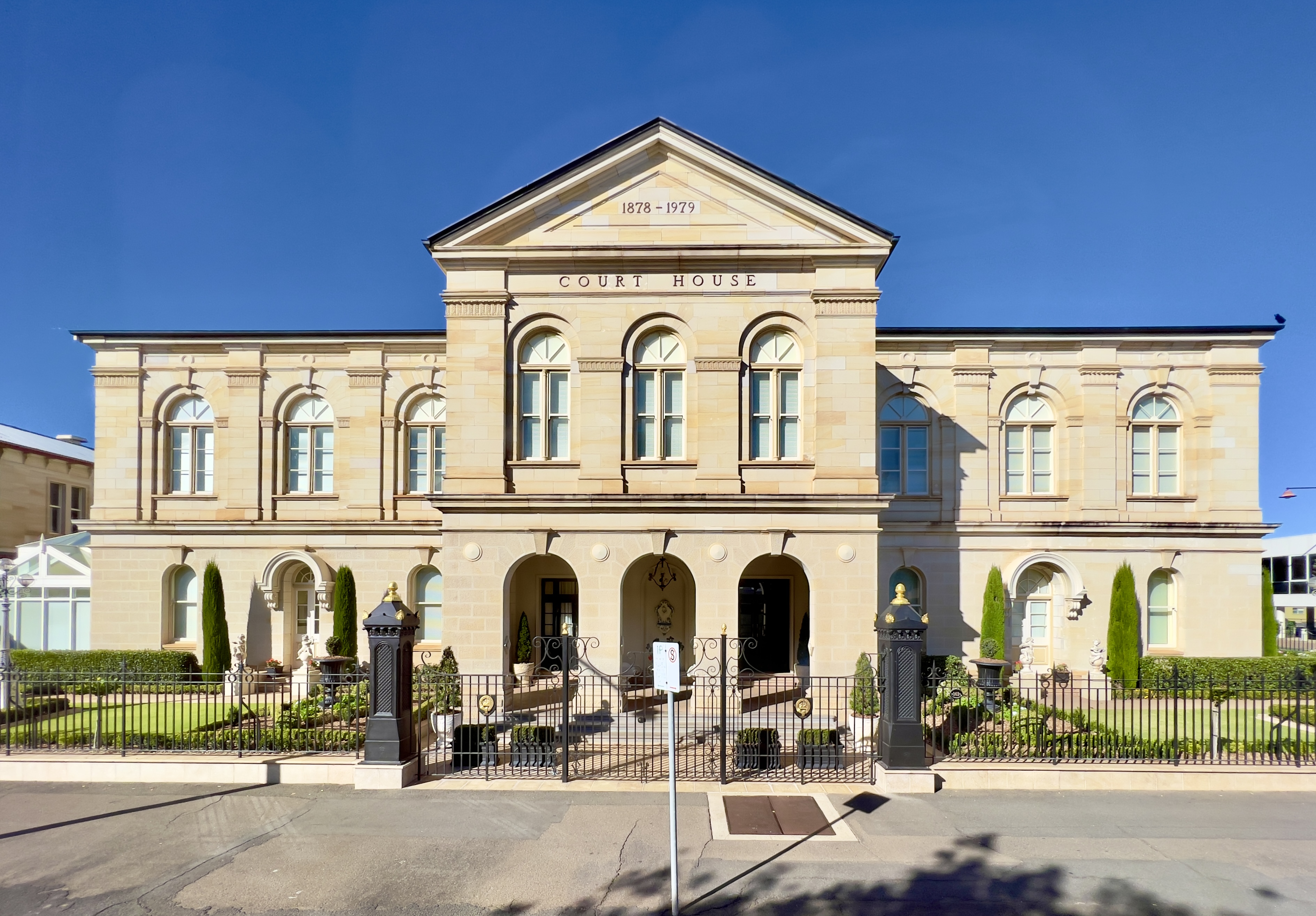
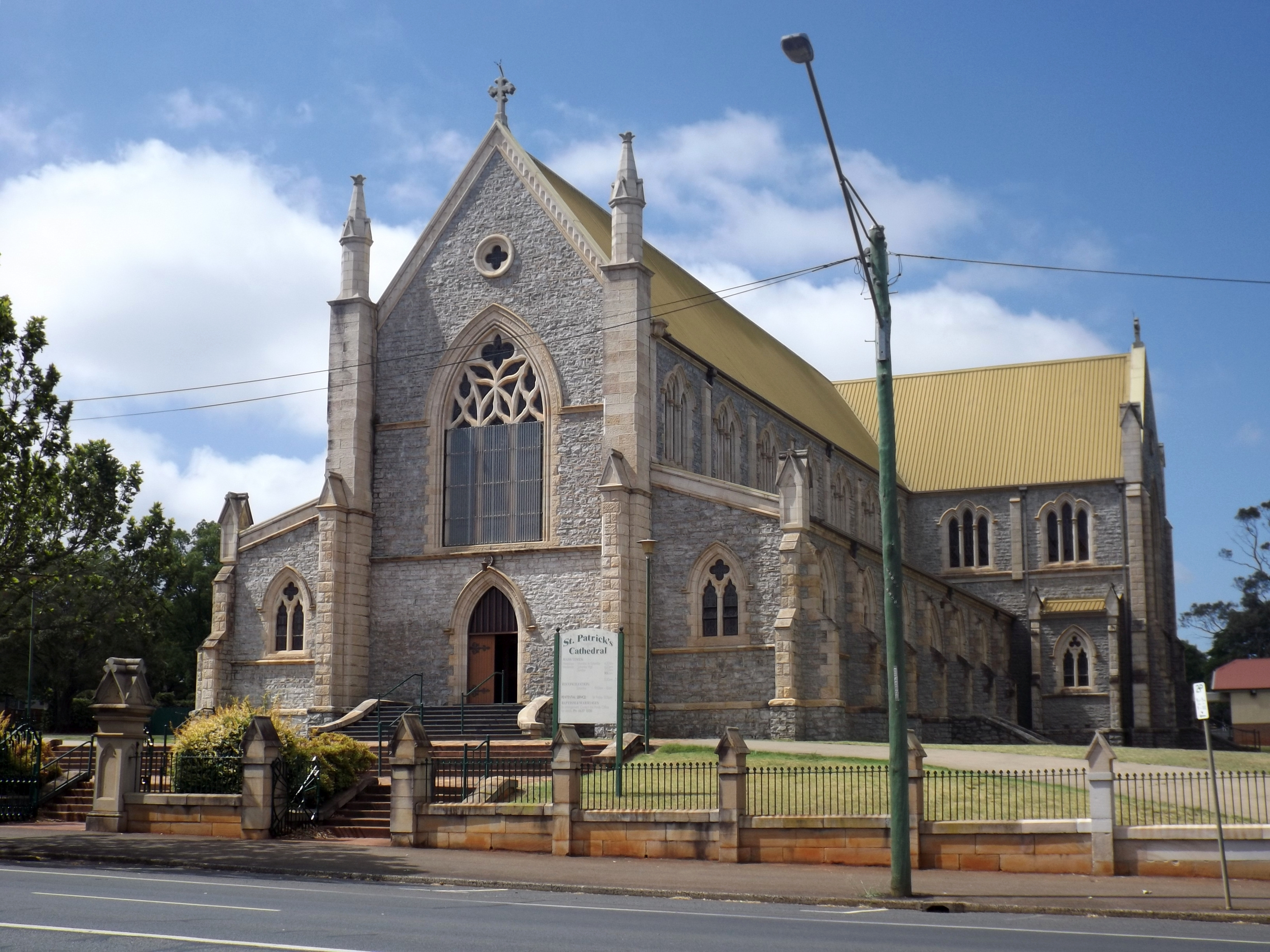
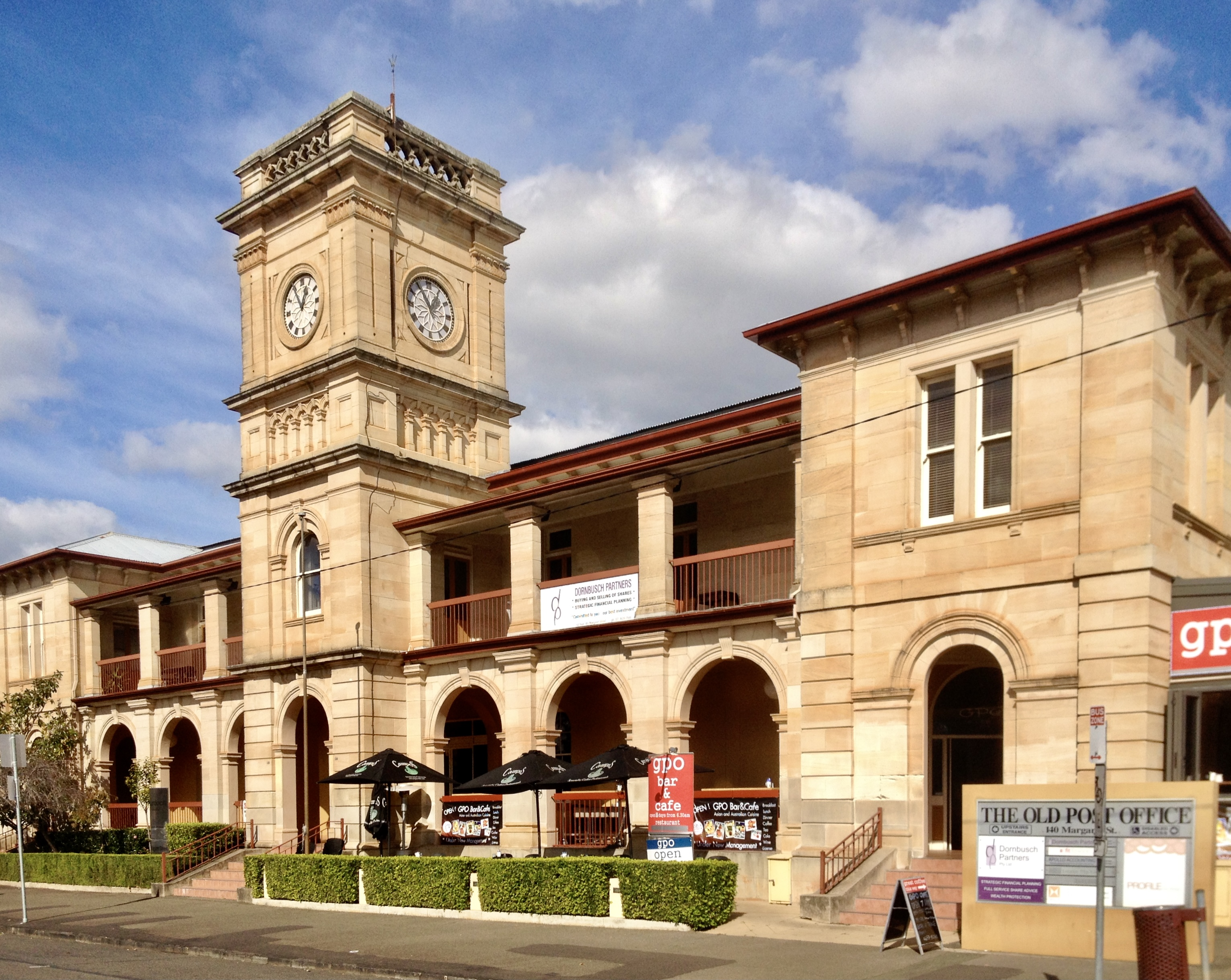
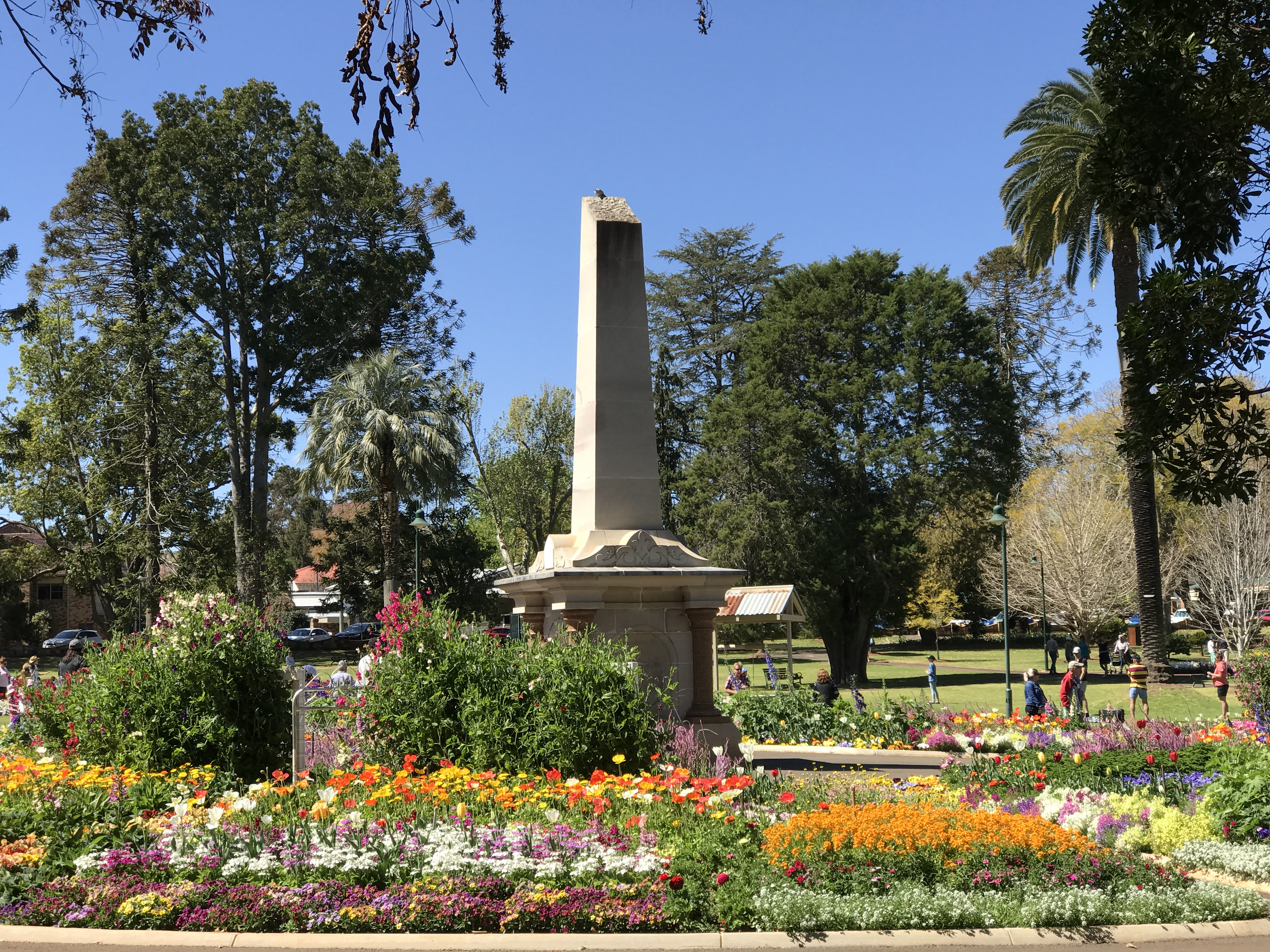
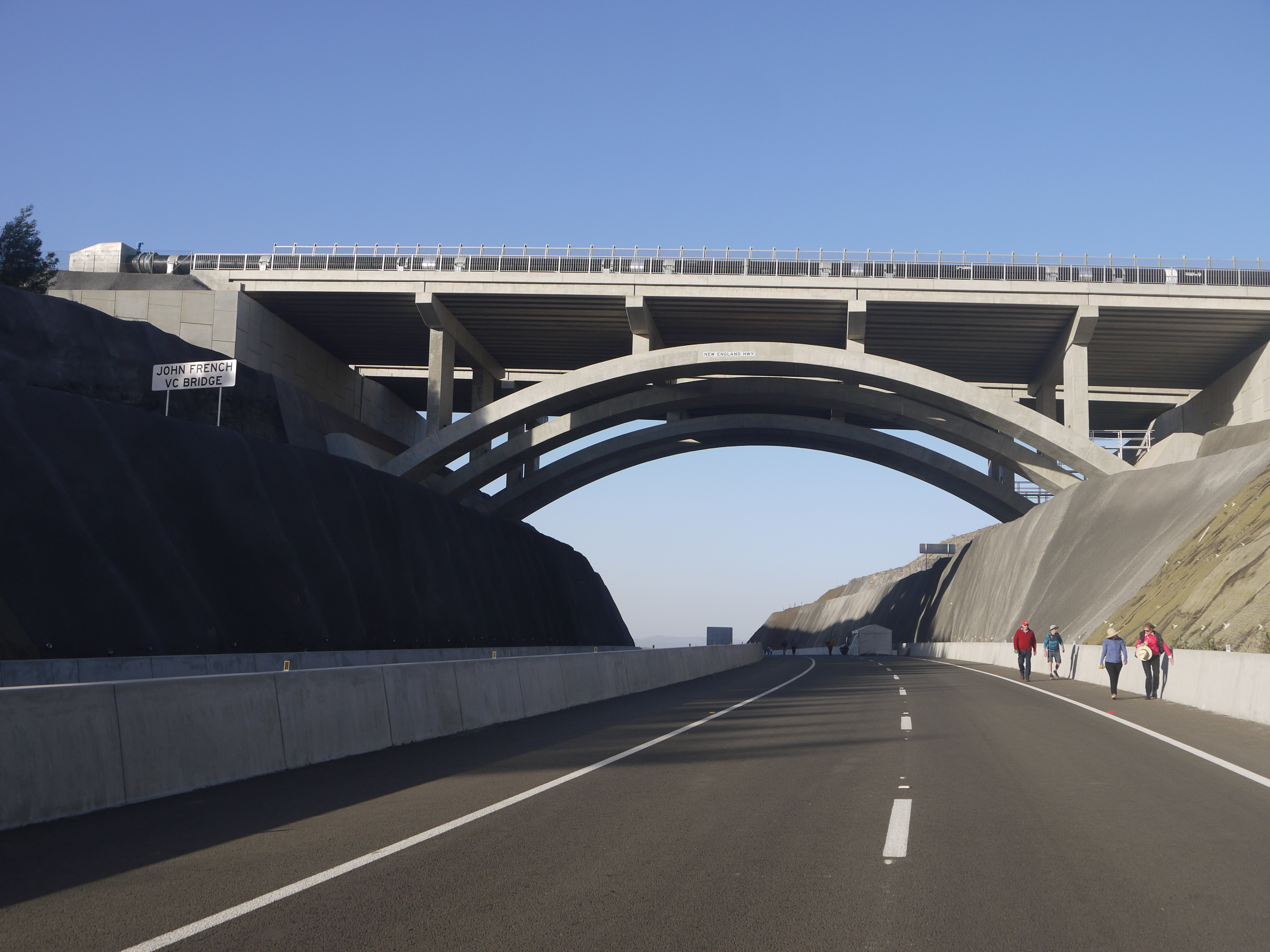
- Panorama City Hall Court House St Patrick's Cathedral Post Office Queens Park Toowoomba Bypass

- Coordinates: 27°34′S 151°57′E
- Country: Australia
- State: Queensland
- LGA: Toowoomba Region
- Location: 83 km (52 mi) SE of Dalby; 83.4 km (51.8 mi) N of Warwick; 127 km (79 mi) W of Brisbane
- Established: 1849

Government
  - State electorates: Toowoomba North; Toowoomba South; Condamine
  - Federal division: Groom

Area (2021 urban)
  - Total: 728.6 km^{2} (281.3 sq mi)
- Elevation: 691 m (2,267 ft)

Population
  - Total: 142,163 (2021 census) (16th)
  - Density: 195.118/km^{2} (505.35/sq mi)
- Time zone: UTC+10 (AEST)
- Postcode: 4350
- County: Aubigny
- Mean max temp: 23.1 °C (73.6 °F)
- Mean min temp: 12.6 °C (54.7 °F)
- Annual rainfall: 726.4 mm (28.60 in)

Toowoomba (/təˈwʊmbə/ tə-WUUM-bə) is a city on the border of the South East Queensland and Darling Downs regions of Queensland, Australia. It is located 132 km (82 mi) west of Queensland's capital, Brisbane. The urban population of Toowoomba as of the 2021 census was 142,163, having grown at an average annual rate of 1.45% over the previous two decades. Toowoomba is the second-most-populous inland city in Australia after the nation's capital, Canberra. It is also the second-largest regional centre in Queensland and is often referred to as the capital of the Darling Downs, or the 4th biggest city in South East Queensland after Brisbane, Gold Coast and the Sunshine Coast. The city serves as the council seat of the Toowoomba Region which has a population of 186,276 as of 2025. It is also one of the host cities of the 2032 Olympic Games, hosting the equestrian events.

Toowoomba, one of Australia's oldest inland cities, was founded in 1849 on the lands of the Giabal and Jarowair people. The city's central streets were named after the history of the House of Stuart. The city became the viceregal summer retreat of Queensland's governors. The city witnessed several significant events during Australia's Victorian period, including the War of Southern Queensland and Battle of One Tree Hill. During the Federation period, Toowoomba emerged as a major artistic and cultural centre with the establishment of the Austral Society.

Toowoomba is celebrated for its preserved Victorian-era and traditional Queenslander architecture, historic churches and gardens, and vibrant food, and coffee culture. The city boasts street art, laneways, and numerous nature trails. The city experiences a distinct four seasons and is home to festivals including the Carnival of Flowers. Notable landmarks include Queens and Laurel Bank Park, the Queensland State Rose Garden, the Empire Theatre, St James' Palace, and Mt Meewah.

== Etymology ==
The exact origin of the city's current name is unknown, although it is widely accepted that the name derives from an Aboriginal language.

When Toowoomba was first discovered by Europeans, it was named "Drayton Swamp" (in reference to the Toowoomba Swamp) and was often nicknamed "The Swamp". One theory is that after European settlement, the local Aboriginal people referred to it as "Tawampa", which is borrowed from "The Swamp".

Another theory is that it derives from the name "Toogoom". This theory was first proposed by author Steele Rudd in a letter to the Toowoomba City Council. He claimed that his father told him that in 1848, he first saw Toowoomba and that he assisted in laying it out the following year. He believed that it derived from the native name "Toogoom" because of the reeds that grew in the area. Rudd also wrote that he remembered that the original Aboriginal name for "The Swamp" was Chinkery Yackan meaning "water like the stars".

Another theory was proposed by the wife of pioneer Toowoomba resident Thomas Alford. She claimed to have asked the Aboriginals what they called the area; they replied with "Woomba Woomba", meaning "the springs and the water underneath". However, she claimed that the Alfords thought this would not be a suitable name for their house and store, so they added the prefix "too-" and omitted one "Woomba" (as this would be a synonym of "two Woomba"), hence "Toowoomba".

In 1875, William Henry Groom wrote an account of Toowoomba. He stated that "Toowoomba" derived from the Aboriginal term "great in the future". However, he did not provide a source for his information.

Another theory was proposed by botanist Archibald Meston in a book titled A Geographical History of Queensland. He wrote:

"Toowoom" or "Choowom" was the local blacks' name for a small native melon (Cucumis pubescens) which grew plentifully on the site of the township. The terminal "ba" is equal to the adverb "There", so the whole word means "melons there", and to an Aborigine it meant "the place where the melon grows".

While this melon still exists and can be found in areas along the Balonne and Warrego Rivers, as well as in areas closer to Toowoomba, there is no evidence that the melon grew near the Toowoomba swamps.

A man named Enoggera Charlie proposed another theory in a news story he wrote for the Sydney Morning Herald. He claimed that when he was looking for work as a tar boy, he camped overnight near the Toowoomba Swamp. He claimed that when he asked a shepherd about the naming of the Toowoomba Swamp, he was told that near the junction of the East and West Swamps, there was a log with an inscription informing swagmen of the way to a well-known homestead where food rations were available. He claimed that the inscription read "To Woombrah".

A man named Ardlaw Lawrence put forward his theory shortly after Enoggera Charlie. He suggested that the name was an Anglicised form of "Boowoomga", which comes from the term for "thunder" in the dialect spoken by the Aboriginal tribe inhabiting areas along the Upper Burnett River (including the town of Gayndah). However, it is highly unlikely that this theory is correct, as this dialect was not spoken in the Darling Downs region (but rather in the Wide Bay-Burnett region) and Lawrence did not state why he transferred the name to the Darling Downs. In fact, the distance between Toowoomba and Gayndah is just over 218 kilometres as the crow flies.

In 1899, George Essex Evans published his theory in a pamphlet. He wrote that "Toowoomba" was an Aboriginal word meaning "meeting of the waters", although no evidence was provided to support this claim.

== Geography ==
Toowoomba is on the crest of the Great Dividing Range, around 700 metres (2,300 ft) above sea level. A few streets lie on the eastern edge of the range, but the majority of the city is situated west of the divide.

The city is situated on the edge of the range and the low ridges behind it. Two valleys extend north from the southern boundary, originating from springs on either side of Middle Ridge near Spring Street, at an altitude of approximately 680 metres (2,230 ft). These waterways, East Creek and West Creek, converge just north of the CBD to form Gowrie Creek.

Gowrie Creek drains west across the Darling Downs and is a tributary of the Condamine River, part of the Murray–Darling basin. The water flowing down Gowrie Creek travels approximately 3,000 km (1,900 mi) to the mouth of the Murray River near Adelaide, South Australia. Rain falling on the easternmost streets of Toowoomba flows east to Moreton Bay, a distance of around 170 km (110 mi).

The rich volcanic soil in the region helps maintain the 159 public parks that are scattered across the city. Jacaranda, camphor laurel and plane trees line many of the city streets. The city's reputation as 'The Garden City' is highlighted during the Australian Carnival of Flowers festival held in September each year. Deciduous trees from around the world line many of the parks, giving a display of Spring colour.

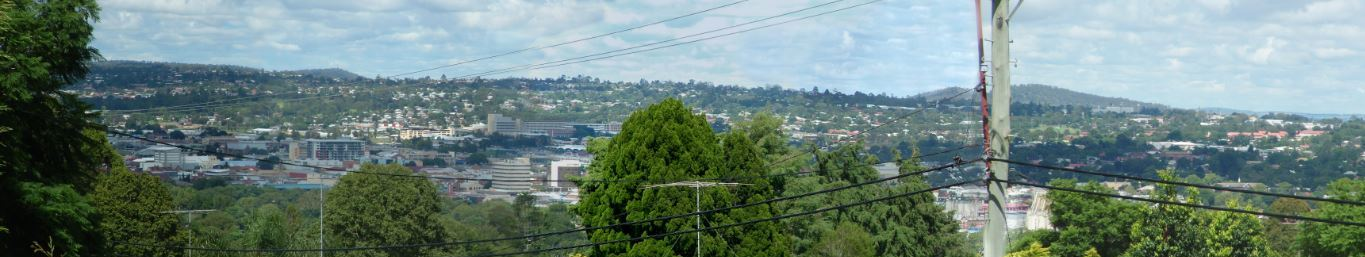
A panorama of Toowoomba looking south-west from Mount Lofty

=== Suburbs ===
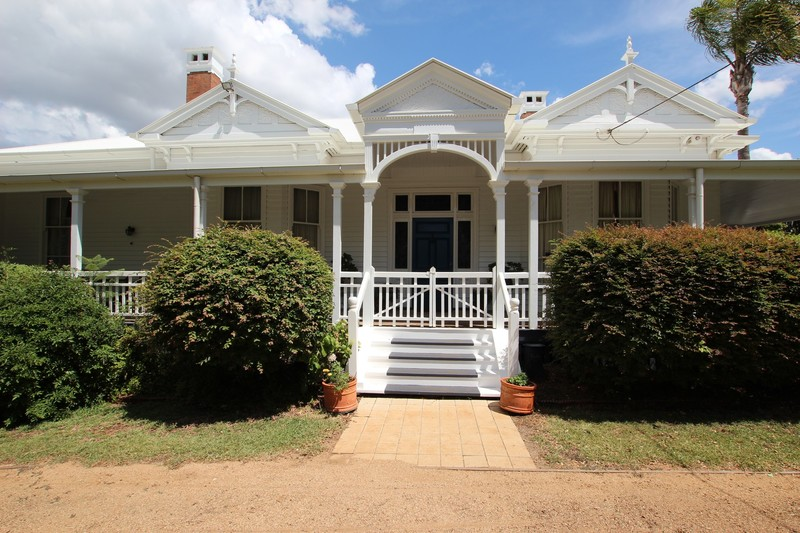
Heritage listed weatherboard villa Elphin in Newtown, characteristic of much of the homes in Toowoomba.

The City of Toowoomba includes the following suburbs:

- Centenary Heights
- Charlton
- Cotswold Hills^{2}
- Cranley
- Darling Heights
- Drayton
- East Toowoomba
- Finnie
- Glenvale^{2}
- Harlaxton
- Harristown
- Hodgson Vale
- Kearneys Spring
- Meringandan
- Middle Ridge
- Mount Kynoch
- Mount Lofty
- Mount Rascal
- Newtown
- North Toowoomba
- Preston
- Prince Henry Heights
- Rangeville
- Redwood
- Rockville
- South Toowoomba
- Toowoomba City (the city centre)
- Torrington^{2}
- Westbrook
- Wilsonton
- Wilsonton Heights
- Wyreema

^{2} - from former Shire of Jondaryan

== History ==
=== Traditional inhabitants of the land ===
Giabal and Jarowair are recognised as the two main Aboriginal language groups of the Toowoomba with Giabal extending south of the city while Jarowair extends north of the city. The Jarowair (also known as Yarowair, Yarow-wair, Barrunggam, Yarrowair, Yarowwair and Yarrow-weir) language region includes the landscape within the local government boundaries of the Toowoomba Regional Council, particularly Toowoomba north to Crows Nest and west to Oakey.

This traditional landscape changed dramatically from 1840 with the incursion of British pastoralists into the region. Those Aboriginal Australians that survived the frontier conflict of this time were pushed to the fringe of society in camps and later moved to missions such as Deebing Creek, Durundur and later Barambah (now Cherbourg). Some local Aboriginal Australians worked on the properties around Toowoomba in this contact period. Ceremonies such as the Bonye Bonye festival remained active until the late 19th century – groups from south east and south west Queensland as well as northern New South Wales gathered at Gummingurru, near Gowrie (west of Toowoomba) prior to attending the festival. The Gummingurru site with its ancient stone circles is being restored by the Gummingurru Aboriginal Corporation and is an important ceremonial place for not only the traditional groups but neighbouring groups.

=== British exploration ===
Toowoomba's colonial history traces back to when English botanist and explorer Allan Cunningham arrived in Australia from Brazil. He conducted an inland expedition north from the New England region and in June 1827 encountered 4 million acres (16,000 km^{2}) of rich farming and grazing land, which he named as the Darling Downs, bordered on the east by the Great Dividing Range and 160 kilometres (100 mi) west of the settlement of Moreton Bay.

=== British colonisation ===
In 1840, Patrick Leslie (second son of the ninth Laird of Warthill) and Peter Murphy established Toolburra Station 56 miles (90 km) south-west of Toowoomba, being the first British pastoralists to take land on the Downs. Later that same year, Eton College graduate, Arthur Hodgson, together with Gilbert Elliot and Cocky Rogers established "Eton Vale" on land which included "The Swamp", now known as Toowoomba.

In forming Eton Vale, Hodgson's brother Christopher Pemberton Hodgson, later described the "constant skirmishes with the natives" to wrest control of the area off the local Aboriginal people. He wrote that hundreds of Aborigines were killed in a bitter war that lasted three years from the time they arrived in the area. The interior of Eton Vale homestead was decorated with spears and boomerangs and other spoil which the Hodgsons had collected after hard fought battles with "the blacks". Hodgson wrote "who would not rather put a ball in their hearts to rid themselves of their ceremonials and presence at once?"

The general mode of attack by the colonists would involve an early morning raid on the Aboriginal camps. The Hodgsons would "generally employ our [black] boys from distant tribes to act as trackers" to locate defiant groups of Aboriginal people. Sometimes a prisoner was taken and "ordered to conduct us to his own camp on risk of his life" and once at this camp, "we rushed to attack it and we had, notwithstanding, ample revenge". Hodgson describes how Aborigines would try to recover "the corpses of those who had fallen victims to the white man's gun in defiance of a sentry on the lookout". Those who were at peace with the Hodgson brothers, were kept in line with methods such as the taking of young boys from the tribe as hostages. Hodgson claimed that if the local Aboriginal people were to be considered a species of simia acaudata or tail-less monkey, they had to be "hunted down and exterminated".

=== Town of Toowoomba ===
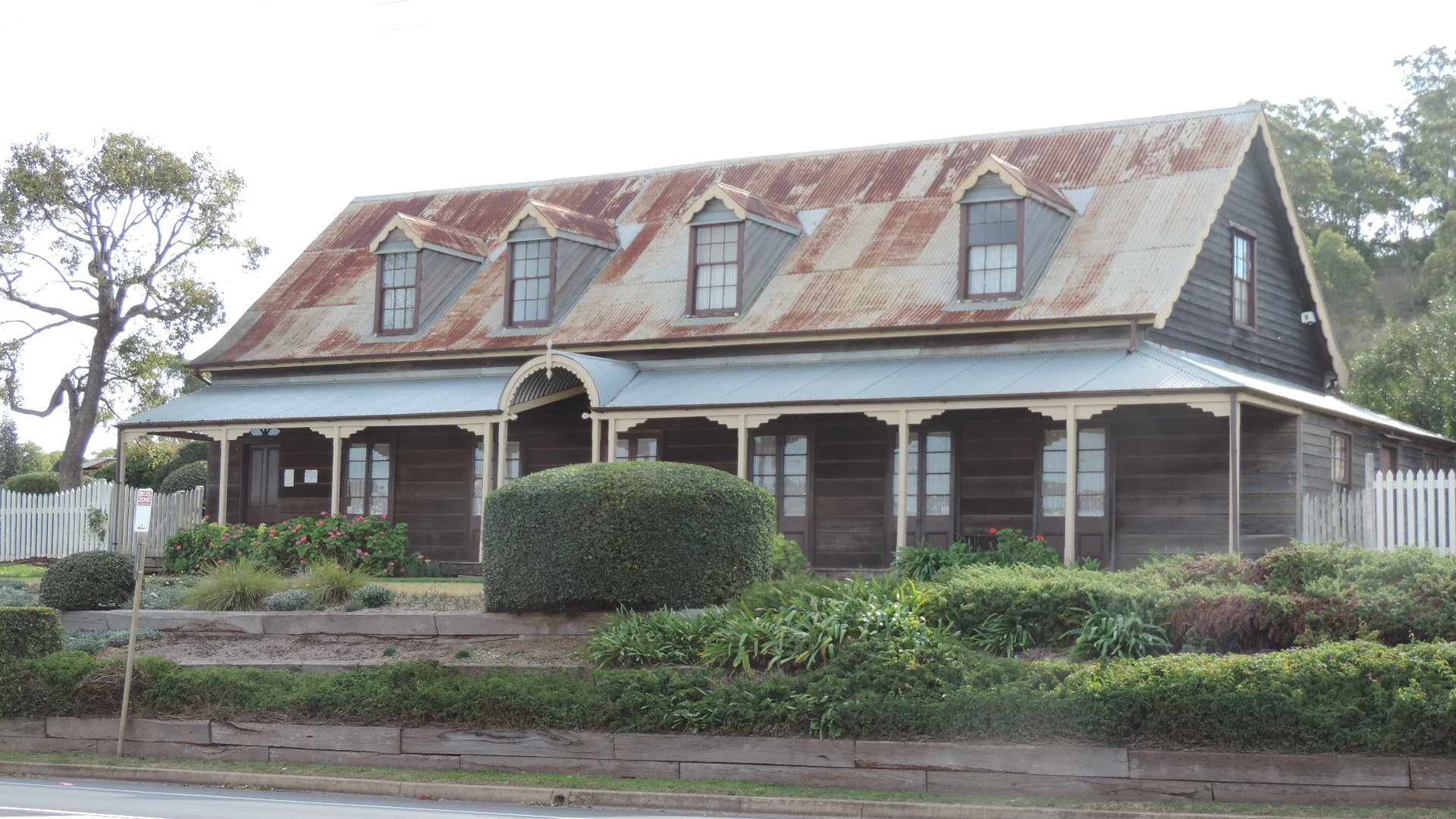
Royal Bull's Head Inn, the building that contributed to Toowoomba's early development

Towards the end of the 1840s, closer settlement was occurring and the nearby township of Drayton had grown to the point where it had its own newspaper, general store, trading post and the Royal Bull's Head Inn, which was built by William Horton and still stands today. The first Britishers began to live at "The Swamp" (Toowoomba) from 1849, where Josiah Dent, William Shuttleworth and William Gurney were employed to cut reeds and timber for use at Drayton. Dent was said to have "lived in a tent, and with his axe, he killed the blacks".

In 1852, Thomas Alford established the first store at Toowoomba. Land for the town of Toowoomba at "The Swamp" was first surveyed in 1849, then again in 1853. By 1858 Toowoomba was growing fast. It had a population of 700, three hotels and many stores. Land selling at £4 per acre (£10 per hectare) in 1850 was by then £150 per acre (£370 per hectare). Governor Bowen granted the wish of locals and a new municipality was proclaimed on 24 November 1860.

The first town council election took place on 4 January 1861 and William Henry Groom won. The railway from Ipswich was opened in 1867, bringing with it business development. In 1892, the Under Secretary of Public Land proclaimed Toowoomba and the surrounding areas as a township and in 1904 Toowoomba was declared a city. Pastoralism replaced agriculture and dairying by the 1900s.

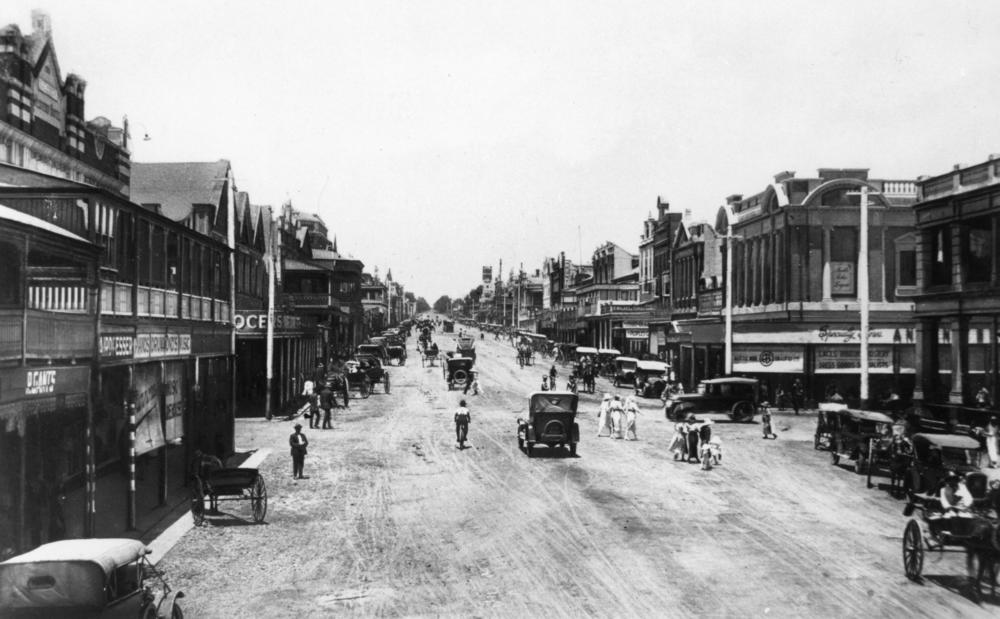
Ruthven Street, Toowoomba, Queensland, ca. 1928

In July 1902, 80 subdivided allotments of "The Lilley Estate" owned by the late Sir Charles Lilley, were advertised to be auctioned by Scholefield & Godsall. A map advertising the auction shows that the estate was bordered by Bridge, Mary and Lindsay Streets and overlooking and adjoining the Royal Agricultural Society's Showgrounds.

In 1905, the Royal Agricultural Society and the Drayton and Toowoomba Agricultural and Horticultural Society merged and the Toowoomba Showgrounds on Campbell Street became the sole venue for the annual show.

The Rotary Club of Toowoomba was established in 1930.

During World War II, Toowoomba was the location of RAAF No.7 Inland Aircraft Fuel Depot (IAFD), completed in 1942 and closed on 29 August 1944. Usually consisting of 4 tanks, 31 fuel depots were built across Australia for the storage and supply of aircraft fuel for the RAAF and the US Army Air Forces at a total cost of £900,000 ($1,800,000).

In 1985, the show left the Toowoomba Showgrounds for the new site in Glenvale.

Toowoomba was named as Australia's Tidiest Town in 2008.

On 10 January 2011, Toowoomba suffered a catastrophic flash flood. Unusually heavy rainfall had occurred in the preceding days, causing the city's waterways to become swollen. Around midday, an intense storm moved in from the northeast, completely overwhelming East Creek and West Creek which run through the CBD. 149.6 mm (5.89 in) fell in one day with rainfall peaking at 144 mm/h (5.7 in/h) over one 10-minute interval. The flood caused damage to properties and infrastructure, and resulted in the deaths of 2 people in Toowoomba.

At the 2016 census, the Urban Centre of Toowoomba recorded a population of 100,032 people. Of these:

- Age distribution: Residents had a similar distribution of ages to the country overall. The median age was 38 years, the same as the national median of 38 years. Children aged under 15 years made up 19.1% of the population (national average is 18.7%) and people aged 65 years and over made up 13.1% of the population (national average is 10.7%).
- Ethnic diversity: 79.1% were born in Australia, compared to the national average of 66.7%; the next most common countries of birth were England 1.9%, New Zealand 1.4%, India 1.2%, Philippines 0.8% and South Africa 0.6%. At home, 84.6% of residents only spoke English; the next most common languages spoken at home were Arabic 0.8%, Mandarin 0.8%, Dinka 0.4%, Tagalog 0.3% and Punjabi 0.3%.
- Finances: The median household weekly income was $1,206, compared to the national median of $1,438. This difference is also reflected in real estate, with the median mortgage payment being $1,517 per month, compared to the national median of $1,755.
- Housing: The majority (76.3%) of occupied private dwellings were separate houses, 16.1% were semi-detached (row or terrace houses, townhouses etc.), and 6.4% were flats, units or apartments. The average household size was 2.4 people.
- Transport: On the day of the Census, 0.8% of employed people travelled to work on public transport, and 77.9% by car (either as driver or as passenger).

== Climate ==
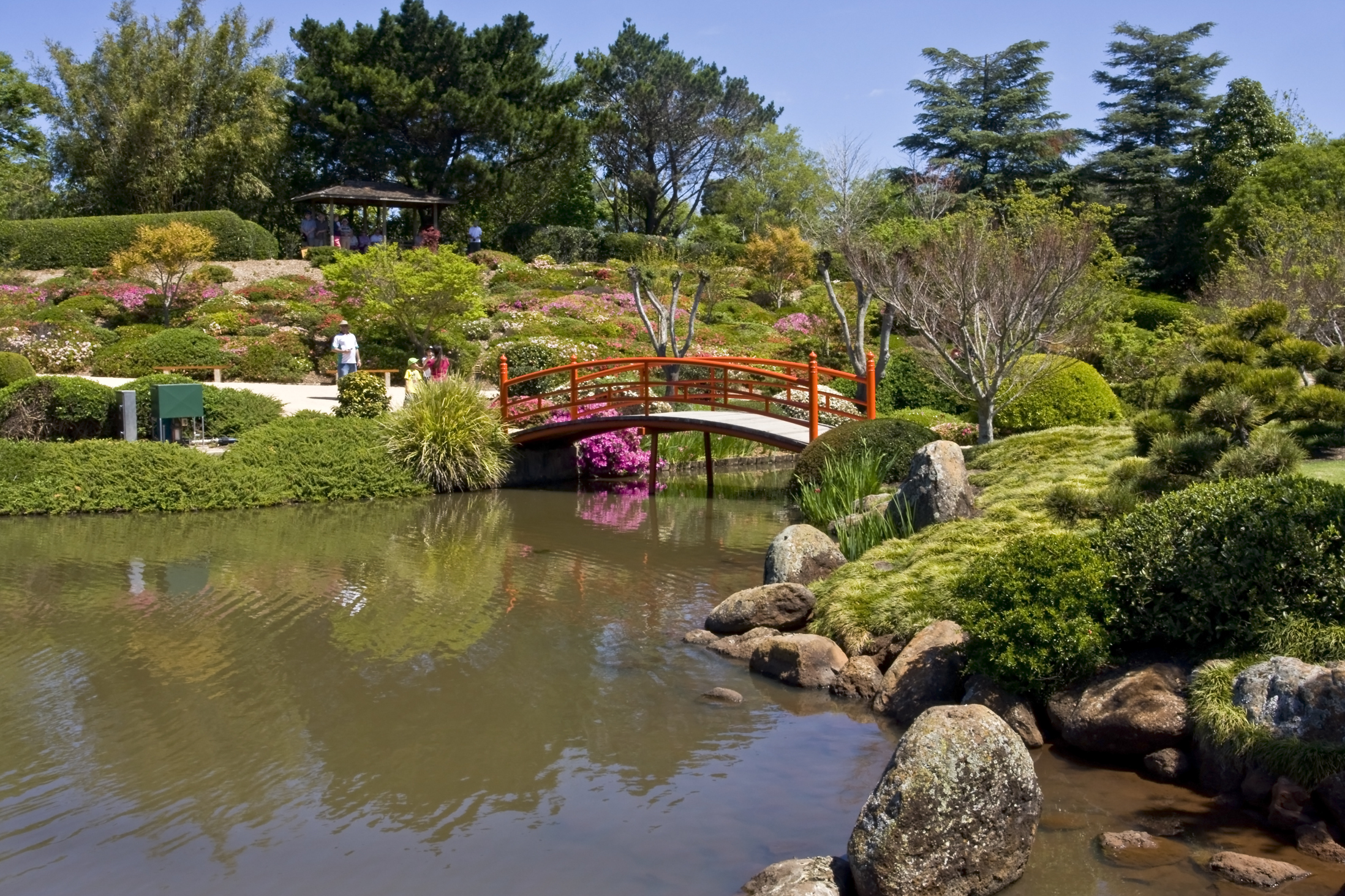
The Japanese Gardens at the Toowoomba Botanic Gardens in spring

Toowoomba has a humid subtropical climate (Köppen climate classification: Cfa) or otherwise known as a warm temperate climate with warm summers and cool winters. The city's inland location as well as elevation and exposed location on the Great Dividing Range influence its climate in several notable ways: Toowoomba experiences more frequent high winds, hail, fog, low maximum temperatures and is even known to have the odd snowfall. As a result, the city has a reputation for being cooler than many other towns and cities in Queensland. Toowoomba is generally sunny, receiving 103.9 clear days annually on average, mostly in winter.

Daily maximum temperatures in Toowoomba average 28 °C (82 °F) in summer and 17 °C (63 °F) in winter. Unlike most of inland Queensland, summer temperatures above 33 °C (91 °F) are uncommon, whilst winter days rarely above 23 °C (73 °F). Winter nights seldom drop below 0 °C (32 °F); however, in a situation somewhat unique among Queensland cities, snow has been reported on the higher parts of the city on several occasions; this is a trait it shares with the Granite Belt to the south along the Great Dividing Range. Light frost will be experienced several nights each winter in the city centre, more often in the western suburbs. According to the Bureau of Meteorology, the highest temperature ever recorded in Toowoomba was 40.8 °C (105.4 °F) on 12 February 2017, while the lowest was −4.4 °C (24.1 °F) on 12 July 1965.

Average annual rainfall is 735 mm (28.9 in), which peaks in the warm season. Rainfall in the eastern suburbs along the Great Dividing Range nudges 1,000 mm (39 in) per year. The majority of Toowoomba's rain falls from November to March, with January and February being the peak rainy months. Like most of south-east Queensland, severe thunderstorms can be a threat and Toowoomba may occasionally be affected by ex-tropical cyclones.

Climate data for Toowoomba Airport (27º32'24"S, 151º54'36"E, 641 m AMSL) (1996–2024 normals, extremes 1957–present)
Month	Jan	Feb	Mar	Apr	May	Jun	Jul	Aug	Sep	Oct	Nov	Dec	Year
Record high °C (°F)	39.5 (103.1)	40.8 (105.4)	36.1 (97.0)	32.3 (90.1)	29.0 (84.2)	27.9 (82.2)	24.7 (76.5)	32.0 (89.6)	34.9 (94.8)	36.4 (97.5)	38.1 (100.6)	38.9 (102.0)	40.8 (105.4)
Mean maximum °C (°F)	34.7 (94.5)	34.2 (93.6)	31.7 (89.1)	27.5 (81.5)	24.4 (75.9)	21.9 (71.4)	21.7 (71.1)	24.7 (76.5)	28.8 (83.8)	31.4 (88.5)	32.9 (91.2)	34.6 (94.3)	36.5 (97.7)
Mean daily maximum °C (°F)	28.4 (83.1)	27.7 (81.9)	26.1 (79.0)	23.2 (73.8)	19.8 (67.6)	17.0 (62.6)	16.8 (62.2)	18.8 (65.8)	22.3 (72.1)	24.6 (76.3)	26.3 (79.3)	27.7 (81.9)	23.2 (73.8)
Daily mean °C (°F)	23.1 (73.6)	22.7 (72.9)	21.3 (70.3)	18.3 (64.9)	14.9 (58.8)	12.3 (54.1)	11.7 (53.1)	13.2 (55.8)	16.4 (61.5)	18.8 (65.8)	20.6 (69.1)	22.2 (72.0)	18.0 (64.3)
Mean daily minimum °C (°F)	17.7 (63.9)	17.6 (63.7)	16.5 (61.7)	13.4 (56.1)	10.0 (50.0)	7.5 (45.5)	6.6 (43.9)	7.6 (45.7)	10.5 (50.9)	12.9 (55.2)	14.8 (58.6)	16.7 (62.1)	12.6 (54.8)
Mean minimum °C (°F)	14.5 (58.1)	14.2 (57.6)	12.4 (54.3)	8.3 (46.9)	3.5 (38.3)	0.9 (33.6)	0.7 (33.3)	1.6 (34.9)	4.8 (40.6)	7.5 (45.5)	10.1 (50.2)	12.7 (54.9)	−0.2 (31.6)
Record low °C (°F)	8.9 (48.0)	7.2 (45.0)	6.1 (43.0)	3.1 (37.6)	−1.8 (28.8)	−3.6 (25.5)	−4.4 (24.1)	−4.2 (24.4)	−0.4 (31.3)	1.9 (35.4)	3.8 (38.8)	7.4 (45.3)	−4.4 (24.1)
Average precipitation mm (inches)	91.2 (3.59)	106.3 (4.19)	87.9 (3.46)	30.1 (1.19)	45.2 (1.78)	34.2 (1.35)	29.4 (1.16)	28.8 (1.13)	33.4 (1.31)	67.0 (2.64)	75.1 (2.96)	103.6 (4.08)	729.2 (28.71)
Average precipitation days (≥ 1.0 mm)	7.2	7.6	7.8	4.2	4.6	4.6	4.0	3.7	4.2	6.5	6.5	7.6	68.5
Average afternoon relative humidity (%)	51	56	52	50	51	54	50	42	40	40	48	49	49
Average dew point °C (°F)	14.8 (58.6)	15.6 (60.1)	13.6 (56.5)	10.4 (50.7)	7.3 (45.1)	5.9 (42.6)	4.2 (39.6)	3.2 (37.8)	5.5 (41.9)	7.3 (45.1)	10.8 (51.4)	13.4 (56.1)	9.3 (48.8)
Source: Bureau of Meteorology (extremes include nearby station)

== Architecture and heritage ==
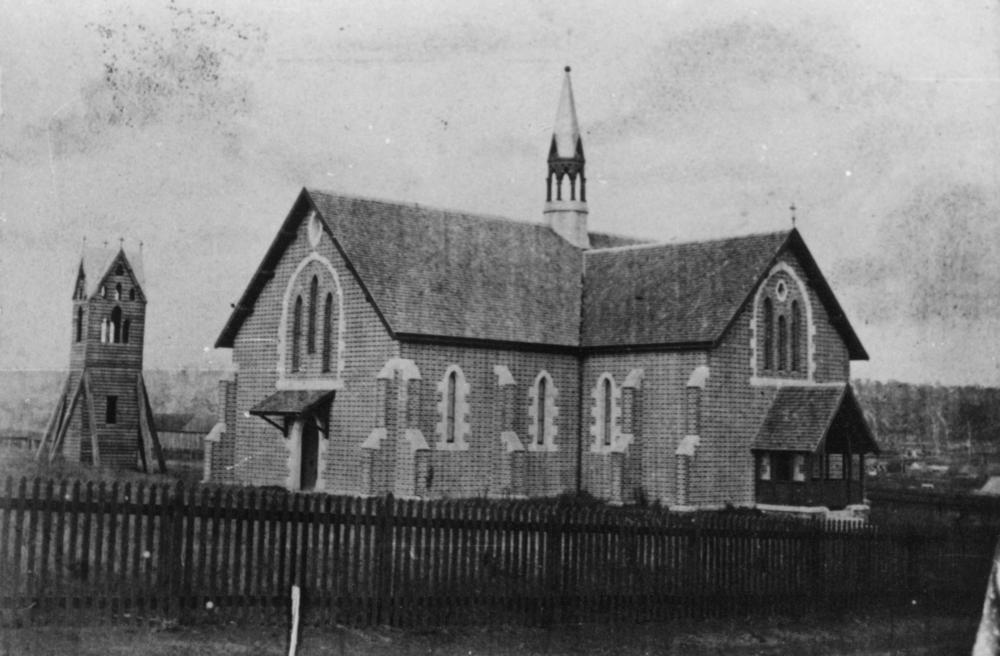
St. James Church of England during construction in 1869

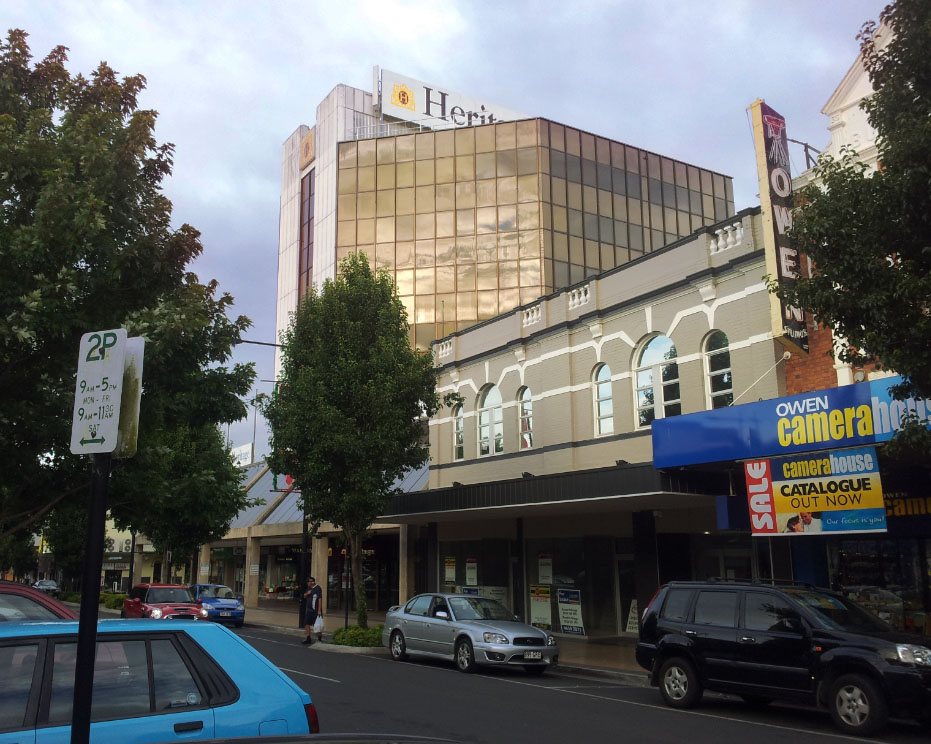
New and old buildings in Ruthven Street, Toowoomba CBD

Toowoomba's history has been preserved in its buildings. Examples of architecture drawing from the city's wealthy beginnings include Toowoomba City Hall which was Queensland's first purpose-built town hall, the National Trust Royal Bull's Head Inn and many examples in the heritage-listed Russell Street. Immediately to the east of the CBD is the Caledonian Estate, an area of turn-of-the-20th-century housing, ranging from humble workers cottages to large stately homes, in the classic wooden Queenslander style.

Toowoomba is also home to the Empire Theatre, which was originally opened in June 1911, as a silent movie house. In February 1933, fire broke out, almost completely destroying the building. However, the Empire was rebuilt and reopened in November 1933. The architectural styling of the new Empire Theatre was art deco, in keeping with the trend of the 1930s. After years of neglect, the Empire Theatre was extensively renovated in the late 1990s, but retains much of its art deco architecture and decorations, especially the proscenium arch. Able to seat approximately 1,500 people, the Empire Theatre is now the largest regional theatre in Australia.

The former Drayton railway station now functions as the DownsSteam heritage railway and museum. Rollingstock includes the only surviving C16 Class, No. 106 "Pride of Toowoomba", Built in 1914 and originally retired in Cairns by 1964.

The city also is home to the Cobb & Co Museum, hailing to the famous mail company's beginnings as a small mail run in the 1800s to transport mail and passengers to Brisbane and beyond. It also houses Australia's largest collection of horse-drawn vehicles. The museum has undergone a A$8 million redevelopment before reopening in September 2010.

=== Heritage listings ===
Toowoomba has many heritage-listed sites, with over fifty on the Queensland Heritage Register in addition to listings on other local heritage registers.

== Governance ==
Flag

Toowoomba is the seat of the Toowoomba Region local government area. The city is represented in the Parliament of Queensland by three seats: Toowoomba North, Toowoomba South and Condamine. In the Commonwealth Parliament, Toowoomba forms part of the Division of Groom, which is held by Garth Hamilton for the Liberal National Party of Queensland.

The current mayor of the Toowoomba Region is Geoff McDonald, who succeeded Paul Antonio after his retirement in July 2023.

== Crime ==
In 2018, the Royal Automobile Club of Queensland described Toowoomba as "one of Queensland's car theft hot spots", noting that there were insurance claims for over 3,000 cars stolen over a three-year period from Harristown alone.

== Economy ==
The Australian Defence Force is also present in the local community, with the city providing housing and amenities for many of the personnel based at the Oakey Army Aviation Centre (in Oakey, 29 km (18 mi) NW of Toowoomba) and Borneo Barracks at Cabarlah to the city's North. The headquarters of People First Bank (Heritage Bank), which is Australia's largest mutual bank, FK Gardners, Wagners, McNab, Mort and Co Beef and Namoi Cotton are all located in Toowoomba. The city itself acts as the service centre for an economic area that reaches from the Western edge of Ipswich in the East, to Northern New South Wales in the south and the QLD Border to the west. Over 40 percent of the exports out of the Port of Brisbane originate from the Toowoomba Region and surrounds; with Beef, Grain and Pulses Coal being the major exports.

== Education ==
Toowoomba is a major education centre with a strong presence of boarders from Western Queensland attending Schools such as Toowoomba Grammar, Fairholme College, Downlands College and The Glennie School.

=== Primary ===
State

- Darling Heights State School
- Drayton State School is the oldest school in Toowoomba.
- Fairview Heights State School
- Gabbinbar State School
- Glenvale State School
- Harlaxton State School
- Harristown State Primary School
- Middle Ridge State School
- Newtown State School
- Rangeville State School
- Rockville State School
- Toowoomba East State School
- Toowoomba North State School
- Toowoomba South State School is the oldest school in Toowoomba proper.
- Wilsonton State School

Private/Religious

- Christian Outreach College Toowoomba
- Concordia Lutheran College (2 campuses)
- Darling Downs Christian School
- Downlands College independent Catholic Co-educational Day and Boarding school
- Fairholme College
- The Glennie School
- Grammar Junior
- Glenvale Christian School
- Holy Name Catholic Primary School
- Mater Dei Primary School
- Our Lady of Lourdes School
- Sacred Heart School
- St Anthony's Primary School Toowoomba
- St Thomas More's School
- St Saviours Primary School
- Toowoomba Anglican College and Preparatory School
- Toowoomba Christian College

=== Secondary ===
State

- Centenary Heights State High School
- Toowoomba Flexi School (annexe of Centenary Heights State High School)
- Clifford Park Special School
- Harristown State High School
- Toowoomba State High School
- Wilsonton State High School

Private/Religious

- Christian Outreach College, Christian co-educational school.
- Concordia College
- Darling Downs Christian School
- Downlands College, independent Catholic Co-educational Day and Boarding school
- Fairholme College, a Presbyterian Church of Queensland school.
- The Glennie School, Anglican day and boarding school
- St Joseph's College
- St. Mary's College
- St Saviour's, Toowoomba's oldest Catholic school
- St Ursula's College, Independent Catholic day and boarding school for girls
- Toowoomba Anglican College and Preparatory School
- Toowoomba Christian College
- Toowoomba Grammar School, independent grammar school (established 1875).
- Mary Mackillop Secondary College, forms part of the existing primary campus in Highfields, opened in 2016

=== Tertiary ===
- University of Southern Queensland
- TAFE Queensland South West (Formerly SQIT) has extensive campuses to the east of the CBD.
- University of Queensland has a small centre in Toowoomba.
- Griffith University has a small health training facility in Toowoomba.

== Culture ==
=== Festivals ===
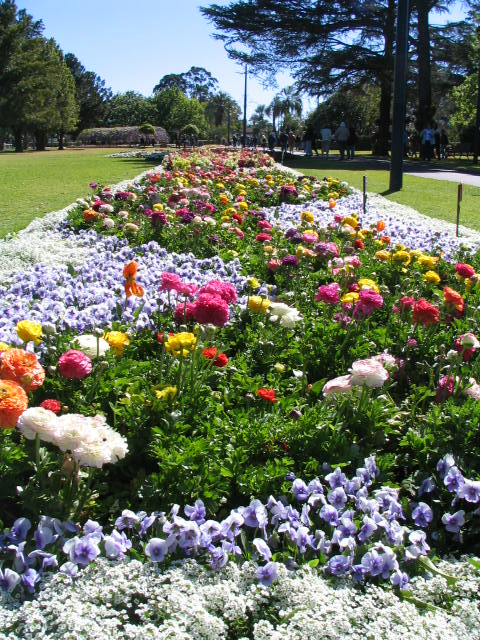
The annual Flower Festival is a chance to show off Toowoomba's parks and gardens at their best

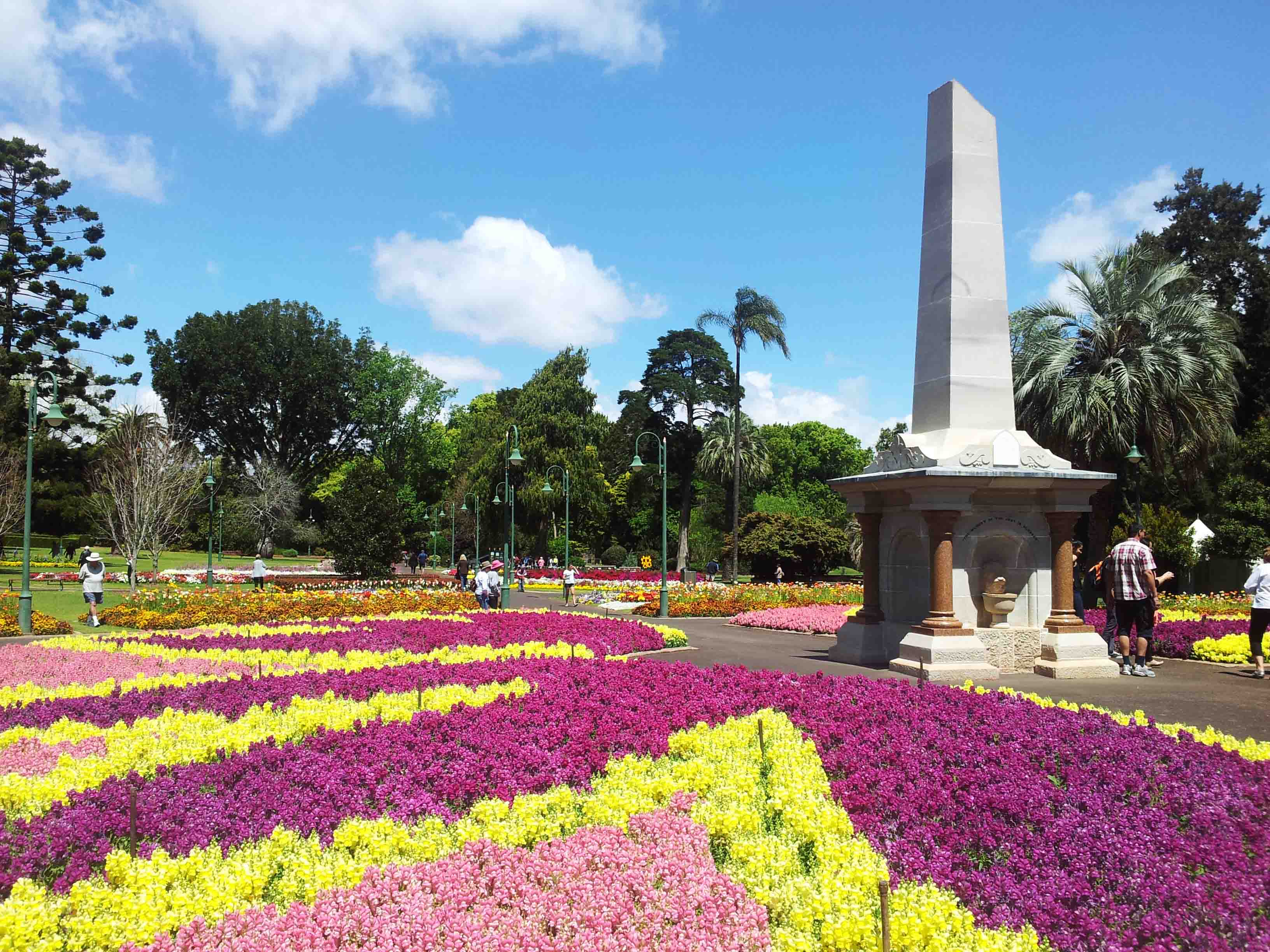
The Alfred Thomas Memorial in Queens Park during the Carnival of Flowers

Toowoomba is nationally renowned for the annual Carnival of Flowers, held each year in September. Many of the city's major parks and gardens are especially prepared for the carnival, including an important home garden competition and parade of flower floats. Buses bring people from around the nation, and a popular way to arrive at the carnival from Brisbane is on chartered antique steam and diesel trains, which captures the yester-year aspect of travel to Toowoomba with 19th-century wooden carriages. The "Food and Wine Festival", which usually spans 3 days, happens every year during the Carnival of flowers. It provides entertainment, food and drinks and is a well-known spectacle of the Carnival.

In 1953 the Carnival of Flowers was the subject of a sponsored film produced by the Queensland Minister for Lands and Irrigation. The Carnival of Flowers depicts the floral parade, the home gardens competition and the crowning of the Floral Queen and is a portrait of life in 1950s Queensland.

In 2009 as part of the Q150 celebrations, Carnival of Flowers was announced as one of the Q150 Icons of Queensland for its role as an "Events and festivals".

The Toowoomba Carnival of Flowers received the Gold Award for Major Festival and Event at the Queensland Tourism Awards in 2015, 2016 and 2017, and Australian Tourism Awards in 2016 and 2017. In 2017, 255,639 people recorded as having attended the event.

Toowoomba also hosts 'First Coat Art and Music Festival'. First Coat is a street art festival, held annually in May. As a result of the festival, over 50 pieces of large-scale, public art exist throughout the Toowoomba CBD, which has led to a transformation of previously underutilised lane and alleyways, as well as a reduction in costs associated with graffiti management.

Toowoomba was previously home to Easterfest, which was held annually over the Easter weekend but was discontinued after 2015 due to budgetary constraints.

In March 2024, the inaugural Toowoomba Fashion Festival was held. It hosted three runways featuring emerging and established designers. The festival is an annual event aimed at reinvigorating the fashion industry in regional Australia.

=== Food ===
Toowoomba was home to the Weis Bar, the birthplace of the Weis brand, until 2021 when the parent company Unilever relocated production to a factory in Western Sydney and the Toowoomba factory closed. Toowoomba is also credited as the origin of Home Ice Cream, Homestyle Bake, and possibly the Lamington. Toowoomba has a cafe and restaurant scene that has been compared to Melbourne's.

Despite not being from Toowoomba, American chain restaurant Outback Steakhouse created a dish called "Toowoomba Pasta", which became very popular in South Korea and inspired Toomba Shin Ramyun.

== Sport ==
=== Rugby league ===
Rugby league is a popular sport in Toowoomba. A team representing Toowoomba used to compete in the Bulimba Cup tournament. Toowoomba currently does not host a team in any of the major national competitions but was home to the Toowoomba Clydesdales in the Queensland Cup state league. The Clydesdales were the feeder team for Brisbane Broncos in the National Rugby League (NRL) from 1999 to 2006. The Clysedales dropped out of the Queensland Cup after the 2006 season due to financial difficulties and are no longer a feeder club for the Brisbane Broncos. Toowoomba Sports Ground (Clive Berghofer Stadium) has hosted trial National Rugby League (NRL) matches since 2003 and premiership matches have been played since 2018 with an average attendance of 7,559 and a record crowd of 10,000 in 2004. The Clydesdales were readmitted into the State competition in 2023 with a changed name from the Toowoomba Clydesdales to the Western Clydesdales.

=== Association football ===
Toowoomba features a semi-professional football club, South West Queensland Thunder, that has a large following within the community. Toowoomba is the headquarters of Football Darling Downs which administers football in Toowoomba and surrounding towns and regions. Toowoomba is home to 12 clubs including South West Queensland Thunder, Fairholme College, Garden City Raiders, Highfields, Rockville Rovers, St Albans, South Toowoomba Hawks, St Ursula's College, University of Southern Queensland, West Wanderers and Willowburn. A-League Men pre-season matches have been held at Toowoomba Sports Ground since 2006 with a record crowd of 4,571.

=== Aussie rules ===
Australian rules football is played by four senior teams in the AFL Darling Downs competition: Coolaroo, Toowoomba Tigers, University of Southern Queensland and South Toowoomba. The sport has gained popularity amongst juniors with eleven clubs in the region. The four Senior Toowoomba clubs compete with five other clubs in towns such as Dalby, Gatton, Goondiwindi, Highfields and Warwick. In 2006, Brad Howard became the first draftee from Toowoomba to the Australian Football League (AFL). Despite the code's popularity, Toowoomba has never hosted an AFL match, even with a capacity upgrade in 2022, the city's premier venue Rockville Park is not currently up to AFL standard.

=== Other sports ===
Toowoomba has clubs for other sports including cricket (Toowoomba Cricket Inc), archery, swimming, tennis, softball, baseball, netball (Toowoomba Netball Association), hockey (Toowoomba Hockey Association), gridiron (Chargers) and basketball (Toowoomba Basketball Association). The city is also home to the Toowoomba Mountaineers basketball team, which participates in the Queensland Basketball League (QBL).

Toowoomba also shares two golf courses; Toowoomba Golf Club Middle Ridge, and City Golf Club Toowoomba. These two clubs, as well as several other clubs in the district, conduct an annual Pennant season. Each club take on each other in match play and in several different divisions to be crowned the Pennant winners of the Year. City Golf Club also hosted the Queensland PGA Championship from 2009 to 2013.

Toowoomba is home to Clifford Park Racecourse. Clifford Park Racecourse was acquired as a 160-acre (0.65 km^{2}) block in 1861. The Toowoomba Turf Club was formed in 1882 and the first recorded Toowoomba Cup was run in 1919. In 1992, the club made Australian racing history by staging the first race ever run under electric lights: the Fosters Toowoomba Cup, which was won by Waigani Drive. In 1996 the club staged the first night race meeting in Australia.

Toowoomba has a number of rugby union teams, including University of Southern Queensland Rugby Union Club, Toowoomba Rangers Rugby Union Club, Toowoomba City Rugby Club, which compete in the Darling Downs Rugby Union competition, against such teams as the Roma Echidnas, the Condamine Cods, the Dalby Wheatmen, the Goondiwindi Emus, the Warwick Water Rats and the University of Queensland Rugby Union Club (Gatton Campus).

Cycling is a popular sport in Toowoomba. The Tour of Toowoomba in 2010 became a round of the Subaru National Road Series and attracted 15 teams. A proposal to stage a National Road Series event in Toowoomba was first presented to the Toowoomba Cycling Club in late 2009 by John Osborne OAM, a lifelong cycling enthusiast. The inaugural FKG Tour of Toowoomba was won by Patrick Shaw riding for the Virgin Blue RBS Morgan team. Patrick was later named Cycling Australia's Road Cyclist of the Year – 2010.

Founded in 1950, the Toowoomba Auto Club ran races at the nearby Leyburn Airfield and Lowood Airfield Circuits in the 1950s and 1960s, and also ran races on the streets of Middle Ridge as part of the Carnival of Flowers in 1958, 1960 and 1961, with the feature races won by Glynn Scott, Alec Mildren and Arnold Glass respectively. The club built the Echo Valley facility, initially as a hillclimbing venue officially opened on 18 September 1966, with the facility now operating as a motocross track. The Australian Hillclimb Championship was held on Prince Henry Drive in 1955 and 1961. From 1923 to 1928 racing for both motorcycle speedway and for cars was held at Werrington Park Speedway on a site south of the Toowoomba City Aerodrome.

Speedway took place around the old Toowoomba Showgrounds, off Campbell Street from 1955 to 1981. The motorcycle speedway track hosted the Queensland Solo Championship in 1955.

Toowoomba is home to three parkrun events: Toowoomba (founded 2013 at Queens Park), South Toowoomba (founded 2018) and Picnic Point (founded 2023). Toowoomba's parkrun events are some of the best attended in Australia with as many as 500 participants.

== Community groups ==
The Toowoomba branch of the Queensland Country Women's Association meets at 263 Margaret Street and the Toowoomba City Business Women's branch meets at 161 Margaret Street.

There are 6 Rotary clubs operating within Toowoomba. All are active within the community raising funds annually in excess of $200,000. The Rotary Cub of Toowoomba meets at Burke and Wills Hotel, 554 Ruthven Street.

== Media ==
=== Print ===
- The Darling Downs Gazette (June 1858 to October 1922)
- The Chronicle (since July 1861)
- High Country Herald
- The Coffee Gazette (since October 2014)
- Darling Downs Star (July 1955 to September 2003)
- Toowoomba's Mail (since September 2003)
- Toowoomba Telegraph (October 2012 to July 2013)

=== Television ===
Toowoomba is serviced by three commercial national network stations and two national non-commercial network stations. These are Seven Queensland, Network 10, WIN Television (Nine Network), ABC Television and Special Broadcasting Service. Each broadcasts television services in digital format, with analogue transmissions having been deactivated on 6 December 2011.

- Seven Queensland (STQ), 7two, 7mate, 7Bravo, 7flix, 7Bravo: Seven Network owned and operated channels.
- WIN Television, 9Gem, 9Go!, 9Life: Nine Network affiliated channels.
- Network 10, 10 Drama, 10 Comedy, Nickelodeon, News24 Regional: Network 10 owned and operated channels.
- Special Broadcasting Service, SBS, SBS2, SBS Food, SBS World Movies, SBS WorldWatch and NITV
- Australian Broadcasting Corporation, ABC TV, ABC Family, ABC Kids, ABC Entertains, ABC News

Of the three commercial networks, Seven Queensland and WIN Television both air 30-minute local news bulletins at 6pm each weeknight, produced from newsrooms in the city but broadcast from studios in Maroochydore and Wollongong respectively. Southern Cross Nine aired a regional Queensland edition of Nine News from Brisbane, featuring local opt-outs for Toowoomba and the Darling Downs from August 2017 to February 2019.

Brisbane metropolitan commercial channels BTQ-7 (Seven Network), QTQ-9 (Nine Network) and TVQ-10 (Network 10) broadcasting from transmission towers at Mount Coot-tha can also be received in some parts of Toowoomba.

=== Radio ===
Toowoomba has many different radio stations including FM and AM channels. Below is a list of some stations available in Toowoomba.

- Hit 100.7 Darling Downs (100.7 FM)
- Triple M Darling Downs 864 (864 AM)
- ABC Southern Queensland (747 AM)
- 92.9 Voice FM (92.9 FM)
- River949 (94.9 FM)
- ABC News Radio (96.7 FM)
- Power FM (88.0 FM)
- Community Radio (102.7 FM)
- Triple J (103.3 FM / 104.1 FM)
- ABC Local Radio Queensland (104.9 FM)
- ABC Classic FM (107.3 FM)
- 4WK (963 AM)
- 4AK (1242 AM)
- The Breeze (1620 AM)

== Transport ==
There is a suburban bus service operated by Bus Queensland Toowoomba throughout the city. This is a Translink service. Stonestreets Coaches operate many school services in the city.

There are frequent inter-city bus services between Toowoomba and Brisbane, and other centres operated by Greyhound Australia and Murrays. Toowoomba was the headquarters for McCafferty's that operated a national long-distance coach network until its sale to Greyhound Australia in 2004.

Toowoomba station has a twice-weekly return rail service from Brisbane to Charleville on Queensland Rail's The Westlander. Toowoomba is a centre for several railway lines that are used both for freight and passenger services, and idle railway stations can be found in the suburbs (including Ballard, Drayton, Harlaxton and Harristown), dating to when these localities were separate centres.

Toowoomba is served by Toowoomba Wellcamp Airport, which is serviced by QantasLink and Rex Airlines, with flights to Brisbane, Sydney and destinations west of the city. The city's former main airport, Toowoomba City Aerodrome is located in Toowoomba's outer suburb of Wilsonton (27.541°S 151.913°E). This airport is now primarily used by the Royal Flying Doctor Service, LifeFlight and the Darling Downs Aero Club.

== Infrastructure ==
=== Health ===
Toowoomba is serviced by four hospitals: Toowoomba Base Hospital, which is a public hospital and one of the largest hospitals in regional Australia, this will soon be replaced via a redevelopment at the Baillie Henderson Hospital site; a specialist psychiatric hospital called Baillie Henderson Hospital; and two private hospitals: St. Andrew's Toowoomba Hospital and St. Vincents Hospital. There is also the Toowoomba Hospice, a community-based private healthcare facility providing palliative care to the terminally ill.

=== Water ===
Toowoomba's third water storage Cressbrook Dam was completed in 1983 and supplied water to Toowoomba in 1988. It has a full capacity of about 80,000 megalitres (2.8 billion cubic feet) bringing total capacity of the three dams, Cooby, Perseverance, and Cressbrook, to 126,000 megalitres (4.4 billion cubic feet). The city also has underground supplies in fractured basalt of the rock unit known as the Main Range Volcanics. Toowoomba also sits above the eastern edge of the Great Artesian Basin and to the west underground water is available beneath unconsolidated alluvium.

Rainfall during the period from 1998 to 2005 was 30% below the long term average, consistent with a prolonged drought; with this trend continuing through to the spring of 2007. In mid-2005, the water situation for the city was becoming critical with water supply levels below 30%. Environmental flows from Cressbrook Dam into Cressbrook Creek were allowed to cease as Toowoomba approached level five water restrictions. During March 2006 the surface water storage in the dams fell below 25% of full capacity, falling further to 12.8% on 10 March 2008 and reaching an all-time low of 7.7% in December 2009.

The former Toowoomba Mayor Di Thorley proposed a controversial potable reuse project under the Toowoomba Water Futures plan which would result in water reclaimed from the Wetalla Sewage Treatment Plant being returned to Cooby Dam to provide 25% of the potable water supply for Toowoomba. Other water supply options include importing water from Oakey Creek Groundwater Management Area (average TDS 1660 mg/L), importing water from Condamine Groundwater Management Area (average TDS 740 mg/L), and water from coal seam gas production (TDS 1200–4300 mg/L).

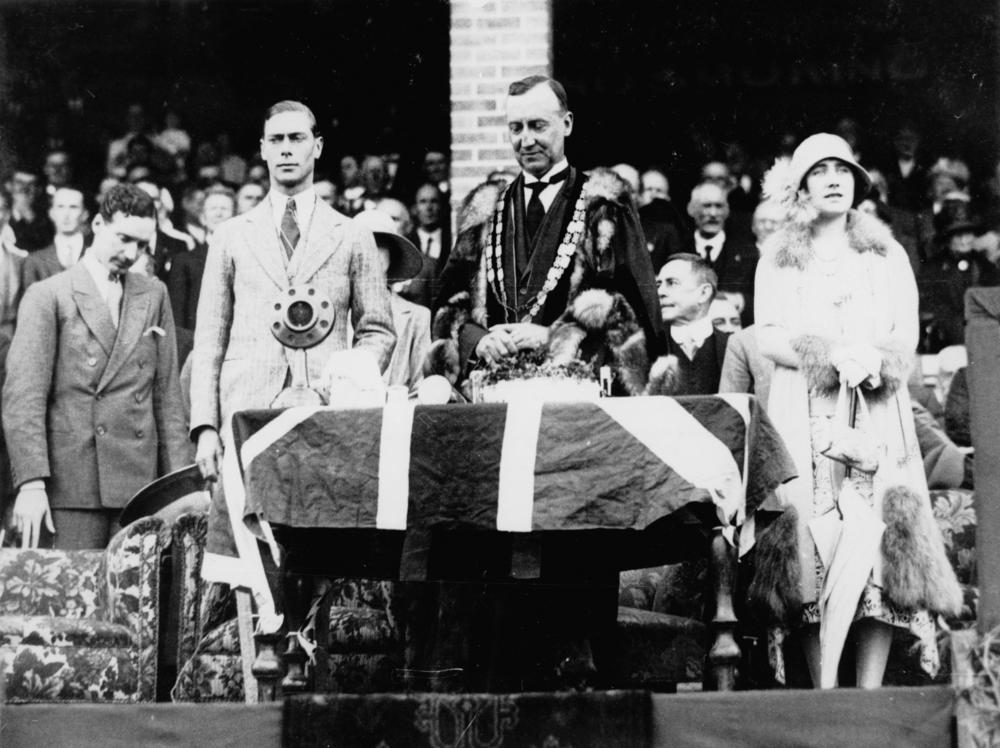
Their Royal Highnesses, The Duke and Duchess of York, with Mayor James Douglas Annand in Toowoomba, 1927.

On 29 July 2006, Toowoomba City Council conducted a poll of Toowoomba residents on the proposal to use this multi-barrier filtration system for filtering sewage for drinking purposes. The poll question was: "Do you support the addition of purified recycled water to Toowoomba's water supply via Cooby Dam as proposed by Water Futures – Toowoomba?" 38% of voters supported the proposal and 62% opposed. This meant that despite dams reaching critical levels, the city rejected the use of recycled water in a plebiscite. Since the public rejection in 2006 of adding recycled sewage to the drinking water supply, water conservation measures have included harvesting stormwater for use in public parks and adding filtered groundwater to the town water supply. The city was under level 5 water restrictions as of 26 September 2006. This prohibits residents from using town water on their lawns, gardens or cars, and residents are strongly urged to cut down on water consumption.

In 2007, the Toowoomba City Council commenced a bore drilling program to augment the dwindling dam supplies and constructed several subartesian bores across the city and one artesian bore at Wetalla in the city's north. Many of the subartesian bores provided potable water with a reliable yield and have been developed into production however the artesian bore's water quality was very poor, prohibiting development as a potable source. This was an expensive setback for the city as the cost was over A$2 million for drilling to over 700 m (2,300 ft). In January 2008, yield testing had been stalled due to the unavailability of appropriate pumping equipment. The Toowoomba Regional Council began supplementing the city's water supply with bore water from the Great Artesian Basin in September 2009. Groundwater has become a significant contributor to the city's water supply needs and now constitutes one third of the total volume of water treated for reticulated supply (160 megalitres (5,700,000 cu ft) per week).

The state government has built a $187 million pipeline from Wivenhoe Dam to Toowoomba. Water pumping along the 38 km (24 mi) pipeline to Cressbrook Dam began in January 2010.

=== Road ===
Toowoomba is the intersection of the A21 Toowoomba Connection Road (A21), Toowoomba Athol Road (A139), New England Highway (A3), Warrego Highway (A2), and the Gore Highway (A39) National Highways (Excluding the A3, which is classed as a State Controlled Road). Post 2019, the Warrego Highway and Gore Highway are now part of the Toowoomba Bypass, with the original section of Warrego Highway through Toowoomba renamed Toowoomba Connection Road (A21). The Gore Highway (A39) was rerouted via the bypass between Athol and Charlton, with the original section of Gore Highway to Toowoomba renamed Toowoomba Athol Road (A139).

== Sister cities ==
Toowoomba has sister city relations with three international cities: Whanganui, New Zealand; Takatsuki, Japan; and Paju, South Korea.

== Religion ==
The 2021 census recorded the following statistics for religious affiliation in Toowoomba: No religion 32.5%; Catholic 20.2%; Anglican 14.2%; Other Christian 5.1%.

Toowoomba Wesleyan Methodist Church is at 267 North Street, Wilsonton Heights (27.5379°S 151.9273°E). It is part of the Wesleyan Methodist Church of Australia.

Toowoomba Chinese Wesleyan Methodist Church is at 21 Kookaburra Court, Glenvale (27.5691°S 151.8924°E). It is part of the Wesleyan Methodist Church of Australia.

Harrison (2006) has noted the appeal of Toowoomba as 'fertile ground' for fundamentalist Christian movements, particularly those with a religio-political outlook. This was exemplified by the Logos Foundation under the leadership of Howard Carter in the 1980s.
