= Redwood, Queensland =

Redwood
- Suburb
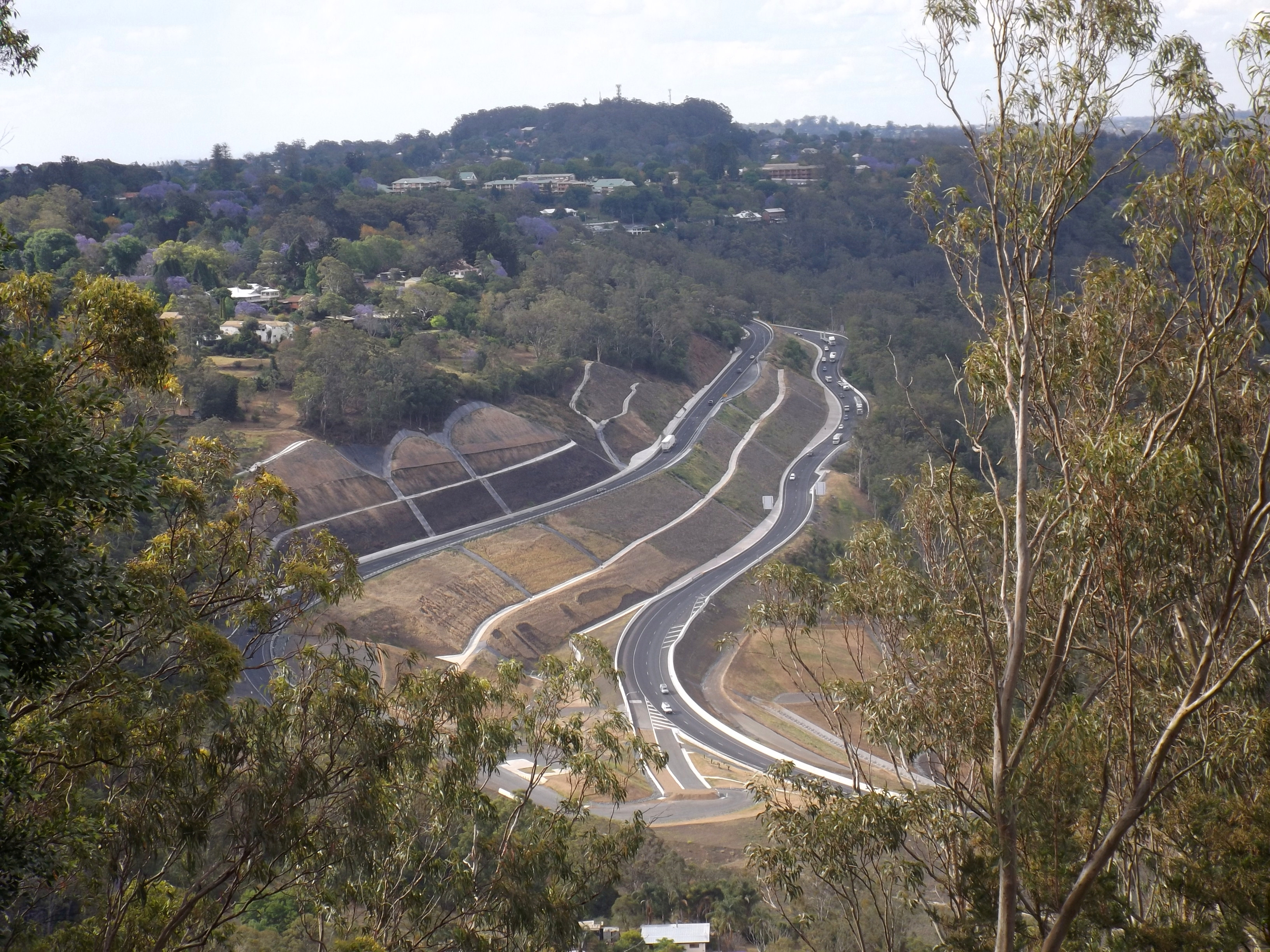
- Warrego Highway, 2014

- Interactive map of Redwood
- Coordinates: 27.5680°S 151.9888°E
- Country: Australia
- State: Queensland
- City: Toowoomba
- LGA: Toowoomba Region
- Location: 6.2 km (3.9 mi) NE of Centenary Heights; 6.2 km (3.9 mi) E of Toowoomba CBD; 121 km (75 mi) W of Brisbane

Government
  - State electorate: Toowoomba North
  - Federal division: Groom

Area
  - Total: 4.3 km^{2} (1.7 sq mi)

Population
  - Total: 159 (2021 census)
  - Density: 37.0/km^{2} (95.8/sq mi)
- Time zone: UTC+10:00 (AEST)
- Postcode: 4350
Suburbs around Redwood
Mount Lofty	Prince Henry Heights	Withcott
East Toowoomba	Redwood	Withcott
Rangeville	Rangeville	Rangeville

Redwood is a rural locality on the outskirts of Toowoomba in the Toowoomba Region, Queensland, Australia. In the 2021 census, Redwood had a population of 159 people.

== Geography ==
Redwood is located 5 kilometres (3 mi) east of the Toowoomba city centre. Half of the suburb's area consists of the 2,243-hectare (5,540-acre) bushland Redwood Park, after which the suburb was named in 1981; the rest, to the south of the highway, is mostly crown land. The residents of Redwood live along the suburb's western boundary with East Toowoomba along the ridge line of the Great Dividing Range at approximately 650 metres (2,130 ft) above sea level, while the rest of locality descends to the east to approximately 360 metres (1,180 ft) at the locality's eastern boundary with Withcott.

The Warrego Highway which connects Ipswich to Toowoomba and towns west of Toowoomba passes through Redwood using the Old Tollbar Road and the Toowoomba Connection Road. This was the major road access over the Great Dividing Range to/from Toowoomba until September 2019 when the Toowoomba Bypass Road (informally known as the Toowoomba Second Range Crossing) opened to the north-east of Toowoomba.

== Demographics ==
In 2006, the locality had a SEIFA score of 1171, placing it ahead of all other localities in the district.

In the 2011 census, Redwood had a population of 17 people.

In the 2016 census, Redwood had a population of 170 people.

In the 2021 census, Redwood had a population of 159 people.

== Heritage listings ==
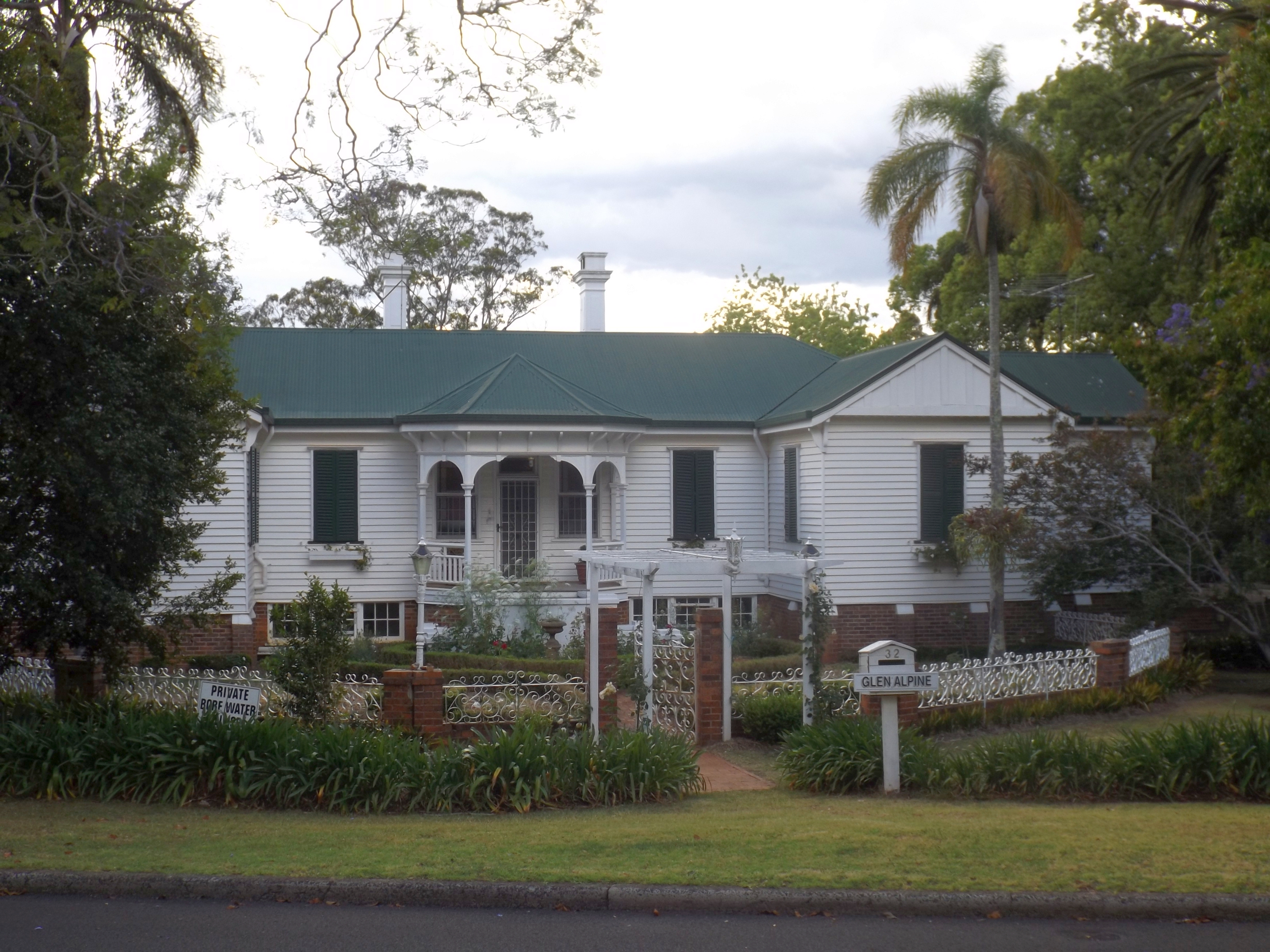
Glen Alpine villa, 2014

The locality is home to the heritage-listed Glen Alpine villa at 32-36 East Street.

== Education ==
There are no schools in Redwood. The nearest government schools are Withcott State School in neighbouring Withcott to the east, Toowoomba East State School in neighbouring East Toowoomba to the west, and Rangeville State School in neighbouring Rangeville to the south. The nearest government secondary schools are Centenary Heights State High School in Centenary Heights to the south-west and Toowoomba State High School in neighbouring Mount Lofty to the north-west.
