= Prince Henry Heights, Queensland =

Prince Henry Heights
- Suburb
- Interactive map of Prince Henry Heights
- Coordinates: 27.5527°S 151.9938°E
- Country: Australia
- State: Queensland
- City: Toowoomba
- LGA: Toowoomba Region
- Location: 5.1 km (3.2 mi) ENE of Toowoomba CBD; 121 km (75 mi) W of Brisbane

Government
  - State electorate: Toowoomba North
  - Federal division: Groom

Area
  - Total: 1.6 km^{2} (0.62 sq mi)

Population
  - Total: 600 (2021 census)
  - Density: 380/km^{2} (970/sq mi)
- Time zone: UTC+10:00 (AEST)
- Postcode: 4350
Suburbs around Prince Henry Heights
Mount Lofty	Withcott	Withcott
Mount Lofty	Prince Henry Heights	Withcott
East Toowoomba	Redwood	Withcott

Prince Henry Heights is a residential locality on the outskirts of Toowoomba in the Toowoomba Region, Queensland, Australia. In the 2021 census, Prince Henry Heights had a population of 600 people.

== Geography ==
Prince Henry Heights is located 5 kilometres (3 mi) east of the Toowoomba city centre. It was named for Prince Henry, Duke of Gloucester, who served as Governor-General of Australia from 1945 until 1947; the suburb's boundary road had been known as Prince Henry Drive well before 1945.

The suburb consists of a small residential area surrounded by Jubilee Park and Redwood Park, two large bushland reserves along Toowoomba's eastern edge.

== Demographics ==
In the 2006 census, Prince Henry Heights had a population of 512 people. Prince Henry Heights was among the most socio-economically advantaged suburbs of Toowoomba; at the 2006 census, residents had a median individual income of $736, compared with $448 for the Toowoomba statistical district, and a median family income of $1,856 compared to $1,116. The suburb had a SEIFA score of 1139, placing it ahead of all other suburbs except Blue Mountain Heights and Redwood.

In the 2016 census, Prince Henry Heights had a population of 571 people.

In the 2021 census, Prince Henry Heights had a population of 600 people.

== Education ==
There are no schools in Prince Henry Heights. The nearest government primary school is Toowoomba East State School in neighbouring East Toowoomba to the south-west. The nearest government secondary school is Toowoomba State High School in neighbouring Mount Lofty to the west.
