= Toll roads in Australia =

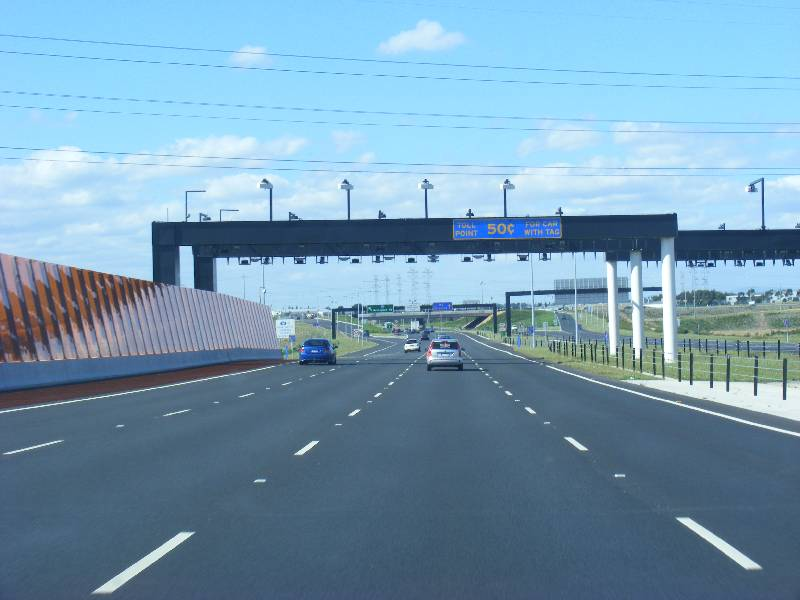
EastLink northbound toll gantry near Wellington Road in Rowville

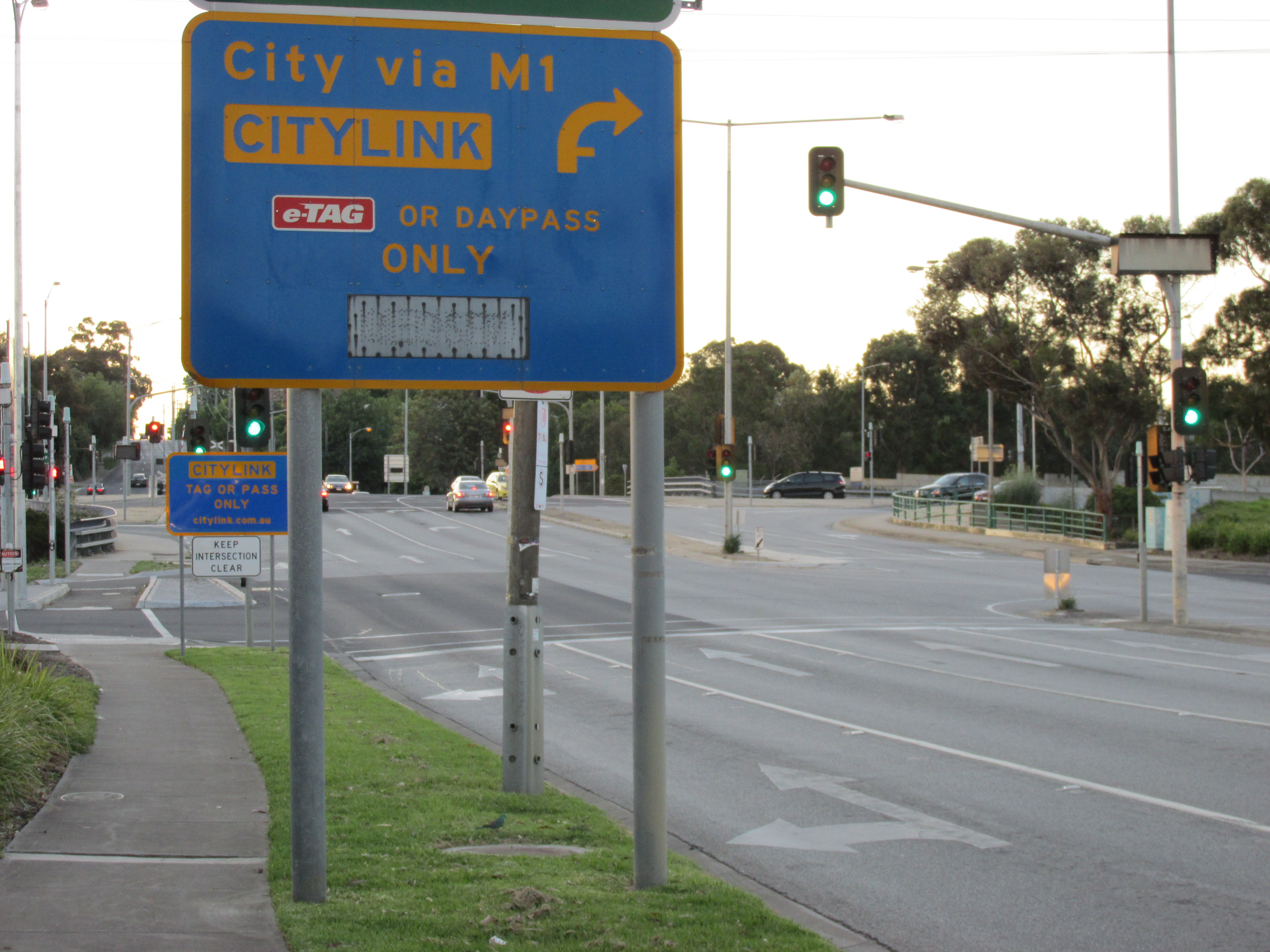
CityLink signage in Melbourne

Australian toll roads are found in the eastern states of New South Wales, Victoria and Queensland. The majority of toll roads in Australia are in Sydney, but there are also toll roads in Melbourne, Brisbane, Ipswich and Toowoomba.

Most of the toll roads are partially owned or operated by Transurban. All toll roads in Australia are tolled electronically (cashless) using free-flow tolling. All toll collection points are toll gantries, with the last cash toll booths in the country closed in July 2013 on the M5 South West Motorway.

Tolls are collected from an e-TAG transponder attached to the vehicle's windscreen. The first e-TAG was developed in the 1990s by Transurban who owns and operates the CityLink in Melbourne in preparation for what would be one of the world's first 'fully electronic' tollways. There are different e-TAG retailers across the country, such as Transurban's Linkt or Transport for NSW's e-Toll.

According to Professor Mark Hickman, the chair of Transport at the University of Queensland's School of Civil Engineering, toll roads in Australia have not reached expected traffic volumes and do not always relieve congestion in the short-term. Melbourne's CityLink tollway (M1 and M2 sections) carry the highest volume of traffic and also generate the highest revenue of all the tollways (by a substantial amount). This is mainly due to the necessary cross-city and North (Melbourne Airport-bound) corridors.

== Current toll roads ==
Toll Road	Location	State	Toll Point
Eastern Distributor	Woolloomooloo	NSW	Woolloomooloo (Northbound)
Military Road E-Ramps	Neutral Bay	NSW	Neutral Bay
Sydney Harbour Bridge	Sydney to North Sydney	NSW	North Sydney and Milsons Point (Southbound)
Sydney Harbour Tunnel	Sydney to North Sydney	NSW	North Sydney (Southbound)
Lane Cove Tunnel	Artarmon to North Ryde	NSW	North Ryde
M2 Hills Motorway	North Ryde to Baulkham Hills	NSW	Multiple
M4 Motorway	Parramatta to Leichhardt	NSW	Multiple
South Western Motorway	Beverly Hills to Moorebank	NSW	Multiple
M5 East Motorway	Beverly Hills to Kyeemagh	NSW	Multiple
Westlink M7 Motorway	Baulkham Hills to Prestons	NSW	Multiple
M8 Motorway	Kingsgrove to Leichhardt	NSW	Multiple
NorthConnex	Wahroonga to West Pennant Hills	NSW	Multiple
Cross City Tunnel	Sydney to Rushcutters Bay	NSW	Sydney
West Gate Freeway (trucks only)	Altona North	Vic	Altona North
CityLink (Southern Link)	Southbank to Kooyong	Vic	Multiple
CityLink (Western Link)	Strathmore to Port Melbourne	Vic	Multiple
EastLink	Donvale to Seaford	Vic	Multiple
West Gate Tunnel	Yarraville to Docklands	Vic	Footscray
Gateway Motorway becomes at Eight Mile Plains	Banyo to Drewvale	Qld	Murarrie and Kuraby
Logan Motorway	Gailes to Loganholme	Qld	Heathwood and Meadowbrook
Legacy Way	Toowong to Kelvin Grove	Qld	Toowong
Clem Jones Tunnel	Woolloongabba to Bowen Hills	Qld	Bowen Hills
Airport Link	Windsor to Clayfield	Qld	Windsor and Clayfield
Go Between Bridge	West End to Milton	Qld	West End
Toowoomba Bypass	Helidon Spa to Athol	Qld	Harlaxton

== Former toll roads ==
Toll Road	Location	State	Toll Point	Toll Removed	Details
Western Motorway	Granville to Silverwater	NSW	Silverwater	16 February 2010	Reinstated 15 August 2017 as part of WestConnex
Sunshine Motorway	Maroochydore to Pacific Paradise	Qld	Pacific Paradise	8 March 1996	
Southern Freeway (F6)	Waterfall to Bulli Tops	NSW	Waterfall	30 July 1995	
Sydney–Newcastle Freeway (F3)	Berowra to Calga	NSW	Berowra	1988	
West Gate Bridge	Port Melbourne to Spotswood	Vic	Port Melbourne	29 November 1985	
Hornibrook Bridge	Brighton to Clontarf	Qld	Clontarf	1979	Bridge was Demolished. Replaced with (toll free) Houghton Highway 1979 and Ted Smout Memorial Bridge 2010
Walter Taylor Bridge	Chelmer to Indooroopilly	Qld	Indooroopilly	1965	
Story Bridge	Fortitude Valley to Kangaroo Point	Qld	Kangaroo Point	1 March 1947	
Springbrook Road	Neranwood to Springbrook	Qld	Neranwood	30 November 1945	
Great Ocean Road	Eastern View to Apollo Bay	Vic	Eastern View	2 October 1936	
Great Eastern Road	Adelaide to Mount Barker	SA	Adelaide Hills	1847	Removed due to public pressure.

== Future toll roads ==
=== New South Wales ===
- M6 Motorway in Sydney, to connect the M8 Motorway at Arncliffe with President Avenue, Kogarah, anticipated to open in late 2028.
- Western Harbour Tunnel in Sydney, to connect the M4-M5 Link, Victoria Road and the Anzac Bridge at Rozelle, with the Warringah Freeway at Cammeray, under planning and anticipated to open in 2028.

=== Victoria ===
- North East Link in Melbourne, to connect the M80 Ring Road at Greensborough with the M3 Eastern Freeway at Bulleen, under planning and anticipated to open in 2027.

== Road pricing reform ==
In 2019, the Grattan Institute published a report titled "Why it’s time for congestion charging: better ways to manage busy urban roads".

Transurban stated in their 1H26 financial investor presentation slides and recording that they were "Exploring RUC [road user charging] in Australia" and "looking at further road user charging trials in Australia".

Transurban trialled a congestion-based demand pricing model in 2016 and has long advocated for a road user charging model.

=== New South Wales ===
John Graham has stated since 2023 that the government is not considering and will not implement congestion charging in NSW. In June 2023 Graham stated "...the NSW Government will not support any recommendations to place tolls on previously untolled roads and there will be no charge to drive into the Sydney CBD, as we promised in the election".

In July 2024, the Independent toll review led by Allan Fels and David Cousins released their findings and recommendations for toll reform in NSW.

In February 2025, bureaucrats were trying to agree on the "purpose, priorities and values" of toll reform. Investment NSW's Economics and Analysis team wrote a report which stated toll reform should implement "consistent, demand-based pricing structures across the existing toll network". The report also stated that as "fairness and equity are not objectives of toll roads", toll reform should not make prices fairer for drivers.

John Graham stated on 15 February 2026 that the government would not implement demand-based pricing.

== Toll concessions and prices ==
=== New South Wales ===
==== Distance-based tolling ====
Toll prices as of 1 July 2025
Toll road	Class A toll prices (Note: Class A vehicles are typically cars and motorcycles; Class B vehicles are all other vehicles including trucks and heavy vehicles)			Class B toll prices	Toll increase	Toll concessionaire	Expiry of toll concession
Toll road	Flagfall	Charge per km	Toll cap	Class B toll prices	Toll increase	Toll concessionaire	Expiry of toll concession
Westlink M7	–	$0.5047	$10.09	3 x of Class A prices	Quarterly on 1 January, 1 April, 1 July, and 1 October, by quarterly CPI	NorthWestern Roads (NWR) Group (50% Transurban, 25% QIC, 25% CPP)	June 2051
WestConnex (M4, M5 East, M8)	$1.73	$0.6411	$12.25	3 x of Class A prices	Annually on 1 January, by the greater of CPI or 4% until December 2040, and then by positive CPI only	Sydney Transport Partners (9% Tawreed Investments 10.5% CPPIB, 10% Caisse de dépôt et placement du Québec (CDPQ), 20.5% Australian Super, 50% Transurban)	2060

==== Fixed or time of day tolling ====
Toll prices as of 1 July 2025
Toll road	Class A toll prices (Note: Class A vehicles are typically cars and motorcycles; Class B vehicles are all other vehicles including trucks and heavy vehicles.)	Class B toll prices	Toll increase	Toll concessionaire	Expiry of toll concession
NorthConnex	$10.15	$30.45	Quarterly on 1 January, 1 April, 1 July, and 1 October, by the greater of quarterly CPI or 1%	NorthWestern Roads (NWR) Group (50% Transurban, 25% QIC, 25% CPP)	June 2048
M2 Hills Motorway	$3.00 (min.) $10.15 (max.)	$9.01 (min.) $30.45 (max.)	Quarterly on 1 January, 1 April, 1 July, and 1 October, by the greater of quarterly CPI or 1%	Transurban	June 2048
Lane Cove Tunnel	$4.13	$14.26	Quarterly on 1 January, 1 April, 1 July, and 1 October, by the greater of quarterly CPI or 1%	Transurban	June 2048
Military Road E-Ramp (to / from Warringah Freeway)	$2.07	$7.13	Quarterly on 1 January, 1 April, 1 July, and 1 October, by the greater of quarterly CPI or 1%	Transurban	June 2048
Cross City Tunnel	$3.36 (Sir John Young Crescent exit) $7.12 (otherwise)	$6.72 (Sir John Young Crescent exit) $14.24 (otherwise)	Quarterly on 1 January, 1 April, 1 July, and 1 October by positive quarterly CPI	Transurban	December 2035
Eastern Distributor (northbound only)	$10.06	$20.11	Quarterly on 1 January, 1 April, 1 July, and 1 October, by the greater of the weighted sum of quarterly AWE and quarterly CPI or 1%	Airport Motorway Limited (75.1% Transurban)	July 2048
M5 South-West Motorway	$5.83	$17.48	Quarterly on 1 January, 1 April, 1 July, and 1 October by positive quarterly CPI	Interlink Roads (100% Transurban)	10 December 2026 (Note: After 10 December 2026, WestConnex distance-based tolls apply to the M5 South-West.)
Sydney Harbour Bridge (southbound only)	$4.41 (max., varies by time of day)	Same as Class A prices	No regular toll increase	NSW Motorways (Note: The Sydney Harbour Bridge is owned by the government and has no toll concessions.)	–
Sydney Harbour Tunnel (southbound only)	$4.41 (max., varies by time of day)	Same as Class A prices	No regular toll increase	NSW Motorways (Note: The Sydney Harbour Tunnel is owned by the government and has no toll concessions.)	–

=== Queensland ===
Toll prices as of 1 July 2025
Toll road		Class 1 (Motorcycles)	Class 2 (Cars)	Class 3 (Light Commercial Vehicles)	Class 4 (Heavy Commercial Vehicles)	Toll increase	Toll concessionaire	Expiry of toll concession
Gateway Motorway	Murarrie toll point (Sir Leo Hielscher Bridges)	$2.90	$5.78	$8.68	$19.91	Annually on 1 July, by CPI	Transurban Queensland (Note: Under a long-term concession agreement with the state) (62.5% owned by Transurban)	31 December 2051
Gateway Motorway	Kuraby and Compton Road toll points	$1.71	$3.41	$5.12	$11.75	Annually on 1 July, by CPI	Transurban Queensland (62.5% owned by Transurban)	31 December 2051
Logan Motorway	Loganlea toll point	$1.09	$2.19	$3.29	$7.53	Annually on 1 July, by CPI	Transurban Queensland (62.5% owned by Transurban)	31 December 2051
Logan Motorway	Heathwood and Paradise Road toll points	$1.80	$3.61	$5.40	$12.43	Annually on 1 July, by CPI	Transurban Queensland (62.5% owned by Transurban)	31 December 2051
Go Between Bridge		$2.03	$4.05	$6.08	$12.15 (Note: Class 4 price shown is the peak hour price (5am–8pm daily). Class 4 off-peak price is $10.75.)	Annually on 1 July, by CPI	Transurban Queensland (Note: Under a long-term concession agreement with the Brisbane City Council) (62.5% owned by Transurban)	December 2063
CLEM7		$3.25	$6.50	$9.75	$19.49 (Note: Class 4 price shown is the peak hour price (5am–8pm daily). Class 4 off-peak price is $17.21.)	Annually on 1 July, by CPI	Transurban Queensland (62.5% owned by Transurban)	August 2051
Legacy Way		$3.50	$7.00	$10.51	$21.01 (Note: Class 4 price shown is the peak hour price (5am–8pm daily). Class 4 off-peak price is $18.56.)	Annually on 1 July, by CPI	Transurban Queensland (62.5% owned by Transurban)	June 2065
AirportlinkM7	Bowen Hills to Kedron or Toombul	$3.42	$6.83	$10.25	$18.11	Annually on 1 January, by CPI	Transurban Queensland (62.5% owned by Transurban)	July 2053
AirportlinkM7	Kedron to Toombul	$2.57	$5.12	$7.69	$13.58	Annually on 1 January, by CPI	Transurban Queensland (62.5% owned by Transurban)	July 2053
Toowoomba Bypass		$1.44	$2.88	$7.14	$28.62	Annually on 1 July, by CPI	Department of Transport and Main Roads (Note: The Toowoomba Bypass is owned by the government, with tolling services provided by Transurban Queensland)	–

=== Victoria ===
Toll prices as of 1 July 2025
Toll road	Toll section or toll points	Maximum toll price per trip					Toll increase	Toll concessionaire	Expiry of toll concession
Toll road	Toll section or toll points	Cars	Motorcycles	Light Commercial Vehicles	Heavy Commercial Vehicles	Long Heavy Commercial Vehicles	Toll increase	Toll concessionaire	Expiry of toll concession
CityLink	Between Moreland Road and Brunswick Road	$3.23	$1.62	$5.17	$9.70 (Note: Prices shown for heavy commercial vehicles are daytime prices. Nighttime prices are two-thirds of daytime prices (night trip cap is $24.25).)		Quarterly on 1 January, 1 April, 1 July, and 1 October by 1.04597% (Note: These are equivalent to fixed increases of 4.25% annually and are only until 30 June 2029. From 1 July 2029, quarterly increases will be determined by CPI)	Transurban	13 January 2045
CityLink	Between Racecourse Road and Dynon Road	$3.23	$1.62	$5.17	$9.70		Quarterly on 1 January, 1 April, 1 July, and 1 October by 1.04597%	Transurban	13 January 2045
CityLink	Between Footscray Road and West Gate Freeway (Bolte Bridge)	$4.04	$2.02	$6.47	$12.13		Quarterly on 1 January, 1 April, 1 July, and 1 October by 1.04597%	Transurban	13 January 2045
CityLink	Batman Avenue north of Olympic Boulevard (Exhibition Street Extension)	$2.02	$1.01	$3.23	$6.06		Quarterly on 1 January, 1 April, 1 July, and 1 October by 1.04597%	Transurban	13 January 2045
CityLink	Batman Avenue entry south of Olympic Boulevard (eastbound only)	$2.02	$1.01	$3.23	$6.06		Quarterly on 1 January, 1 April, 1 July, and 1 October by 1.04597%	Transurban	13 January 2045
CityLink	Batman Avenue exit south of Olympic Boulevard (westbound only)	$5.25	$2.63	$8.40	$15.76		Quarterly on 1 January, 1 April, 1 July, and 1 October by 1.04597%	Transurban	13 January 2045
CityLink	Domain Tunnel (westbound only)	$7.27	$3.64	$11.63	$21.82		Quarterly on 1 January, 1 April, 1 July, and 1 October by 1.04597%	Transurban	13 January 2045
CityLink	Punt Road exit (westbound only)	$3.23	$1.62	$5.17	$9.70		Quarterly on 1 January, 1 April, 1 July, and 1 October by 1.04597%	Transurban	13 January 2045
CityLink	Burnley Tunnel (eastbound only)	$7.27	$3.64	$11.63	$21.82		Quarterly on 1 January, 1 April, 1 July, and 1 October by 1.04597%	Transurban	13 January 2045
CityLink	Between Church Street and Burnley Street (eastbound only)	$3.20	$1.60	$5.12	$9.60		Quarterly on 1 January, 1 April, 1 July, and 1 October by 1.04597%	Transurban	13 January 2045
CityLink	Between Yarra Boulevard and Toorak Road / Monash Freeway	$3.23	$1.62	$5.17	$9.60		Quarterly on 1 January, 1 April, 1 July, and 1 October by 1.04597%	Transurban	13 January 2045
CityLink	Trip cap	$12.13	$6.06	$19.40	$36.38		Quarterly on 1 January, 1 April, 1 July, and 1 October by 1.04597%	Transurban	13 January 2045
West Gate Freeway	Between Millers Road and Williamstown Road	No toll			$19.78 (Note: Price shown is the daytime price. Nighttime price is $13.19.)	$29.67 (Note: Price shown is the daytime price. Nighttime price is $19.78.)	Quarterly on 1 January, 1 April, 1 July, and 1 October by 1.04597%	Transurban	13 January 2045
West Gate Freeway	Hyde Street ramps	$4.09	$2.05	$6.54	No additional tolls, toll already covered by West Gate Freeway toll charges		Quarterly on 1 January, 1 April, 1 July, and 1 October by 1.04597%	Transurban	13 January 2045
West Gate Tunnel	Within tunnel	$4.09	$2.05	$6.54	No additional tolls, toll already covered by West Gate Freeway toll charges		Quarterly on 1 January, 1 April, 1 July, and 1 October by 1.04597%	Transurban	13 January 2045
West Gate Tunnel	City exit to Footscray Road, Dynon Road and Wurundjeri Way (eastbound only and AM peak (Note: AM peak period is 7am–9am weekdays, excluding public holidays) only)	$6.54	$3.27	$10.47	No additional tolls, toll already covered by West Gate Freeway toll charges		Quarterly on 1 January, 1 April, 1 July, and 1 October by 1.04597%	Transurban	13 January 2045
Combined West Gate (Note: The heavy vehicle toll point on the West Gate Freeway covers the freeway and the West Gate Tunnel) & CityLink trip	Combined Heavy Vehicle Trip Cap	N/A			$36.81 (Note: Price shown is the daytime price. Nighttime price is $24.54.)	$55.22 (Note: Price shown is the daytime price. Nighttime price is $36.81.)	Quarterly on 1 January, 1 April, 1 July, and 1 October by 1.04597%	Transurban	13 January 2045
EastLink	Tunnel section	$3.56 (Note: Prices shown for cars are weekday prices. Weekend and public holiday prices are 80% of weekday prices (weekend and public holiday trip cap is $6.22.)	$1.78	$5.71	$9.46		Annually on 1 July by CPI	ConnectEast	2043
EastLink	Each of the four toll points between Maroondah Highway and High Street Road	$0.52	$0.27	$0.83	$1.38		Annually on 1 July by CPI	ConnectEast	2043
EastLink	Each of the six toll points between High Street Road and Greens Road	$0.78	$0.39	$1.24	$2.06		Annually on 1 July by CPI	ConnectEast	2043
EastLink	Each of the two toll points between Greens Road and Mornington Peninsula Freeway	$1.82	$0.90	$2.90	$4.81		Annually on 1 July by CPI	ConnectEast	2043
EastLink	Trip cap	$7.77	$3.88	$12.43	$20.58		Annually on 1 July by CPI	ConnectEast	2043

== See also ==
- Freeways in Australia
- Road transport in Australia
