= Upper Lockyer, Queensland =

Upper Lockyer
- Suburb
- Interactive map of Upper Lockyer
- Coordinates: 27.4836°S 152.0716°E
- Country: Australia
- State: Queensland
- LGA: Lockyer Valley Region
- Location: 19.7 km (12.2 mi) NE of Toowoomba CBD; 32.8 km (20.4 mi) NW of Gatton; 123 km (76 mi) W of Brisbane CBD

Government
  - State electorate: Lockyer
  - Federal division: Wright

Area
  - Total: 15.2 km^{2} (5.9 sq mi)

Population
  - Total: 542 (2021 census)
  - Density: 35.66/km^{2} (92.4/sq mi)
- Time zone: UTC+10:00 (AEST)
- Postcode: 4352
Suburbs around Upper Lockyer
Murphys Creek	Murphys Creek	White Mountain
Murphys Creek	Upper Lockyer	Helidon
Lockyer	Lockyer	Lockyer

Upper Lockyer is a rural locality in the Lockyer Valley Region, Queensland, Australia. In the 2021 census, Upper Lockyer had a population of 542 people.

== History ==
Lockyer Upper State School (also known as Upper Lockyer State School) opened on 3 July 1939. It closed on 27 September 1968. It was on the western side of Murphys Creek Road at the junction with Lockyer Siding Road (27.5022°S 152.0717°E), now within the locality boundaries of Lockyer.

== Demographics ==
In the 2016 census, Upper Lockyer had a population of 538 people.

In the 2021 census, Upper Lockyer had a population of 542 people.

== Education ==
There are no schools in Upper Lockyer. The nearest government primary school is Murphy's Creek State School in neighbouring Murphys Creek to the north-west. The nearest government secondary schools are Toowoomba State High School in Mount Lofty to the south-west and Centenary Heights State High School in Centenary Heights, also to the south-west.

== Community groups ==
The Upper Lockyer Withcott branch of the Queensland Country Women's Association meets at 4 Biggs Road, Withcott.
