= Toowoomba Bypass =

Road in Queensland, Australia

Toowoomba Bypass Queensland
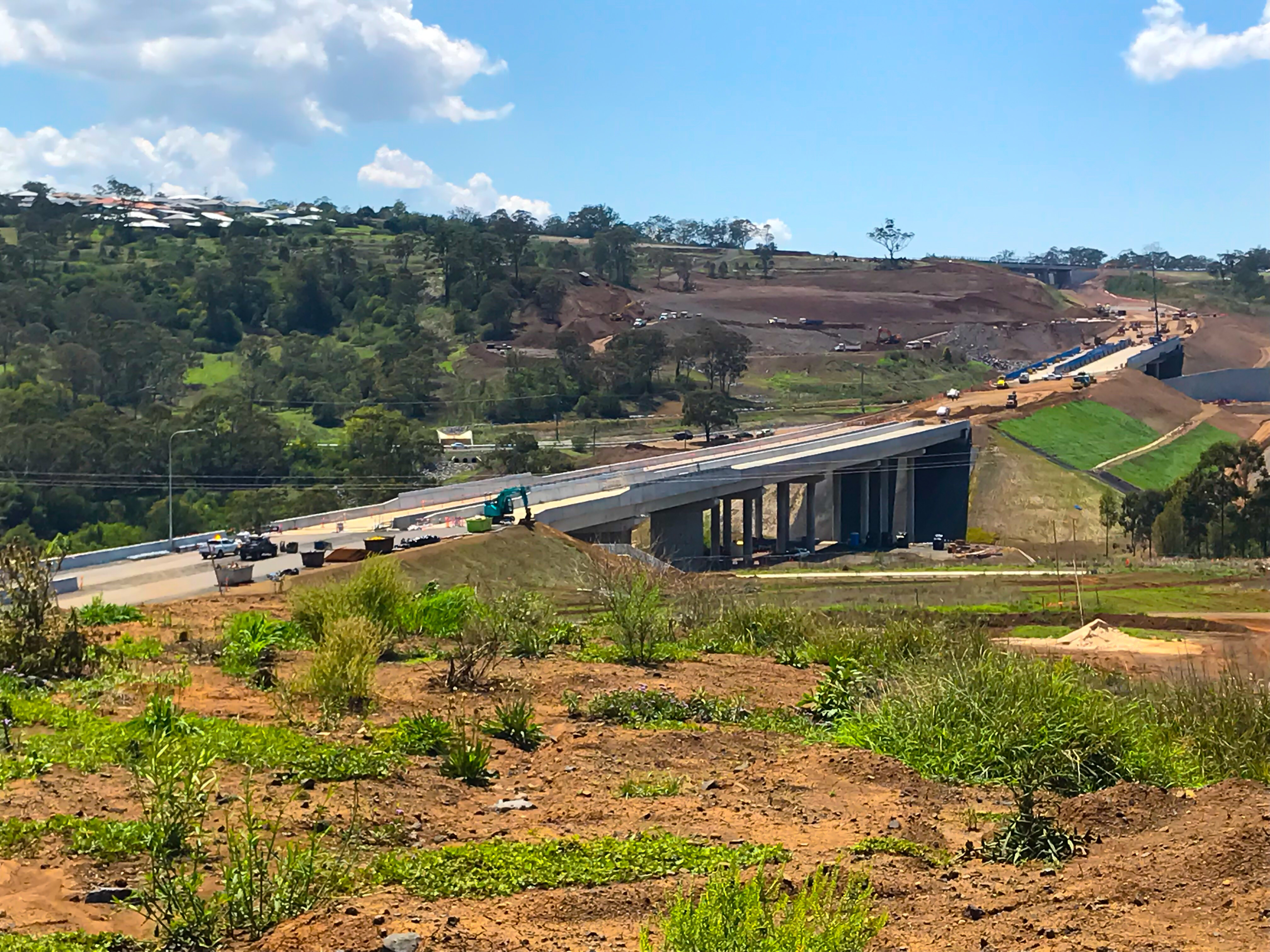
- Toowoomba Bypass during construction, looking east from Cranley.

General information
- Type: Highway
- Length: 41.3 km (26 mi)
- Opened: 8 September 2019
- Route number(s): (Helidon Spa – Cranley); (Cranley – Charlton); (Charlton – Athol)
- Ring road around: Toowoomba

Major junctions
- Northeast end: Warrego Highway (National Highway A2), Helidon Spa
- Mort Street, Cranley; Boundary Street, Cranley (Note: On- and off-ramps on the eastern side only.); Warrego Highway (National Highway A2); Toowoomba Connection Road (National Highway A21)
- Southwest end: Gore Highway (National Highway A39 / State Route 85), Athol

Location(s)
- Major settlements: Postmans Ridge, Withcott, Mount Kynoch, Cranley, Charlton, Wellcamp, Athol

Highway system
- Highways in Australia; National Highway • Freeways in Australia; Highways in Queensland

The Toowoomba Bypass, known as Toowoomba Second Range Crossing during planning and construction, is a 41.3 km (25.7 mi) grade separated, dual carriageway bypass and partial ring road constructed to the north and west of Toowoomba, Queensland. Construction commenced in April 2016. It opened to traffic on 8 September 2019.

The Toowoomba Bypass is a toll road. It is the only toll road in Australia that is not located in Greater Sydney, Greater Melbourne, or Greater Brisbane, and the only one that does not pass through a capital city, and one of only 10 located outside New South Wales.

== History ==
The city of Toowoomba is situated on a plateau on the edge of the Great Dividing Range. A defining characteristic of the city is its high position on an escarpment of the range, which enjoys sweeping views of the Lockyer Valley below. The existing range road was completed in its current alignment in 1939. This road has unfavourable road geometry including tight corners and a rate of climb as high as 10.5%. The Warrego Highway is a major Brisbane-Darwin highway that passes through Toowoomba and utilises the existing range road. The Gore Highway is part of a major freight corridor that travels from Melbourne to Toowoomba, which includes the Goulburn Valley and Newell Highways. In 2015, prior to construction of the bypass, up to 22,000 vehicles (including 2,900 heavy vehicles) traversed the city's CBD each day, passing through up to 18 sets of traffic lights.

=== Planning ===
The need for a future second range crossing was first highlighted by Queensland Transport in 1991. In 1995, An Ove Arup traffic planning study was completed confirming the need for a second range crossing. In 1997, an alignment route option passing to the immediate north of Toowoomba City was identified in a Maunsell concept phase planning report. The traffic planning study determined that the bypass route has to be close to the city as 85 percent of Warrego Highway traffic is stopping in Toowoomba. The proposed new alignment for the Warrego Highway commenced to the east, bypassing the Toowoomba City centre to the north and linking up to the Warrego and Gore Highways on the western side of Toowoomba. The proposed alignment was 42.2 km long; up to 40 bridge structures; five major interchanges; and twin 735 metre long three lane tunnels through the range crest. Detailed planning of the project commenced in 2001 with the preferred alignment option ultimately refined by 2004. In late 2005, the federal government announced funding of $10 million to advance the business case for the project. AusLink committed $43 million towards further planning in 2008. A pilot tunnel 2.4m wide and 3.0m high was dug to provide detailed geological information. The pilot tunnel was in the centre of where the westbound tunnel was proposed.

=== Construction ===
In August 2015, the Department of Transport & Main Roads under the Newman government awarded the contract to design, construct, and maintain the Toowoomba Second Range Crossing as it was then known to Nexus Infrastructure, a consortium of the Plenary Group, Cintra, Acciona, Ferrovial and Broadspectrum. Nexus was chosen on the basis that its proposal used an open-cut design instead of tunnels, allowing trucks carrying dangerous goods to utilise the bypass. There was also the concern that while the pilot tunnel had been dry at the time of excavation (during a drought), it later drained up to 10,000 litres of water per day.

The federal and state governments jointly funded the $1.6 billion project on an 80:20 basis. It was delivered in a 25-year public–private partnership with the Nexus Infrastructure consortium. Upon completion, the road would be tolled.

=== Opening ===
The bypass opened to traffic on 8 September 2019. The Warrego Highway (A2) was rerouted via the bypass between Helidon Spa and Charlton (in the west), with the original section of Warrego Highway through Toowoomba renamed Toowoomba Connection Road (A21). The Gore Highway (A39) was rerouted via the bypass between Athol and Charlton, with the original section of Gore Highway to Toowoomba renamed Toowoomba Athol Road (A139).

==== Milestones ====
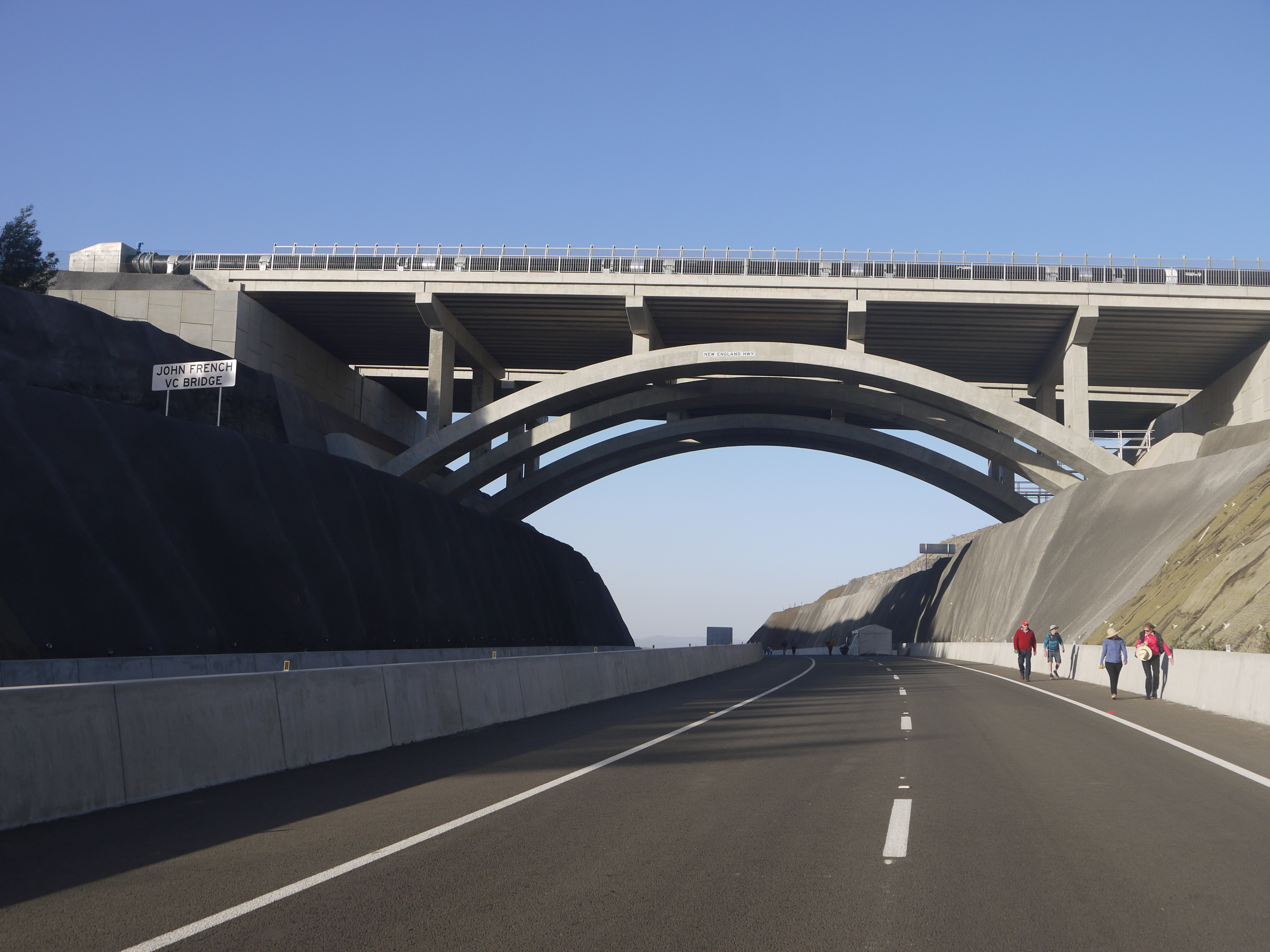
New England Hwy overpass (John French VC Bridge)

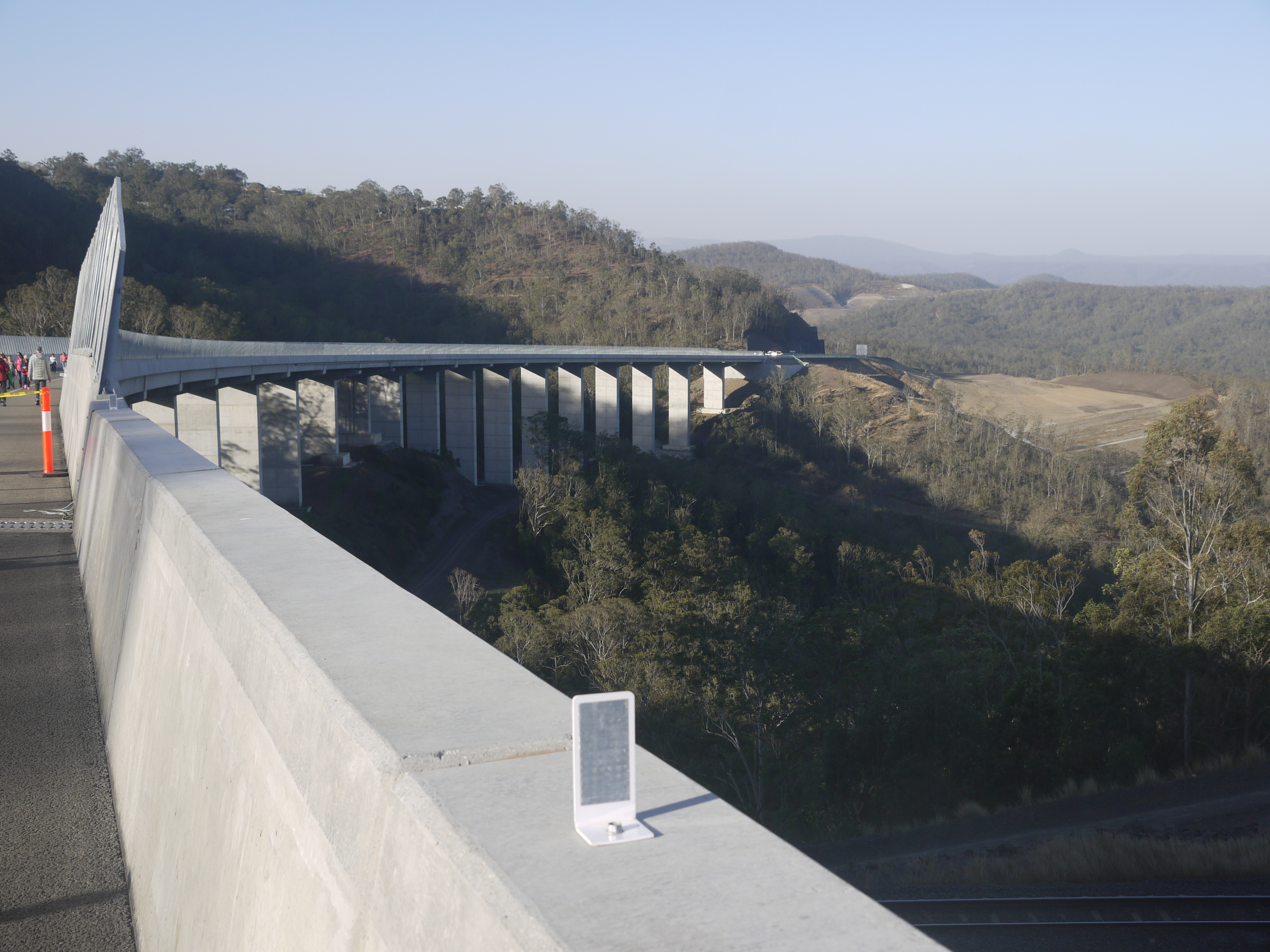
The Multuggerah Viaduct is a key feature of the new bypass

- 31 January 2014 – Federal and state governments agreed to underwrite $1.6 billion to build a tunnel
- 21 August 2015 – The Nexus Infrastructure consortium awarded to finance, build, operate and maintain the motorway.
- 15 April 2016 – Start of major construction
- 8 December 2018 – Western section of the crossing, between Mort Street (Cranley) and the Gore Highway (Athol), opened to traffic
- Late 2018 – Scheduled completion. Originally scheduled for late 2018, but geological issues on embankment 24 set back expected completion by 4 to 7 months.
- 7 September 2019 – Community Events including an open day featuring a walk on the viaduct, a 73km bike ride and a 42km marathon.
- 8 September 2019 – Formal Opening Ceremony. Opening to traffic starting from 6pm. 3 month toll free period begins.

== Benefits ==
The benefits of the new road to road users and the community, as claimed by the Queensland Government, include:

- Avoids up to 18 sets of traffic lights in Toowoomba
- Reduces travel time (by up to 40 minutes) and greater travel time reliability
- Improved freight efficiency by redirecting up to 80% of heavy and super heavy commercial vehicles away from the Toowoomba central business district
- Reduction in vehicle operating costs by ensuring a maximum slope gradient of 6.5% across the Toowoomba Range, a significant decrease from the existing range crossing which is up to 10%
- Accommodate regional growth and increase productivity on the Darling Downs
- Safer and less congested route than the existing range crossing

== Route description ==
The Bypass commences just west of Postmans Ridge Road on the Warrego Highway. It deviates north-west passing up the range at a maximum gradient of 6%. After travelling for approximately 15 kilometres (9.3 mi), the road passes over the 800-metre (2,600 ft) long Multuggerah Viaduct and then through a 30-metre (98 ft) cutting, passing under the New England Highway at the top of the range. From there it travels in a general south-west direction reconnecting with the Warrego Highway at Charlton and ultimately connecting with the Gore Highway at Athol. The bypass features 24 bridges, six interchanges and nine creek crossings. The posted speed limit is 100 km/h (62 mph) for its entirety except between Charlton and Mort Street where it is 90 km/h (56 mph). The speed limit is enforced by a point-to-point speed camera.

== State-controlled road ==
The Toowoomba Second Range Crossing is a state-controlled national road (number 319).

== Tolls ==
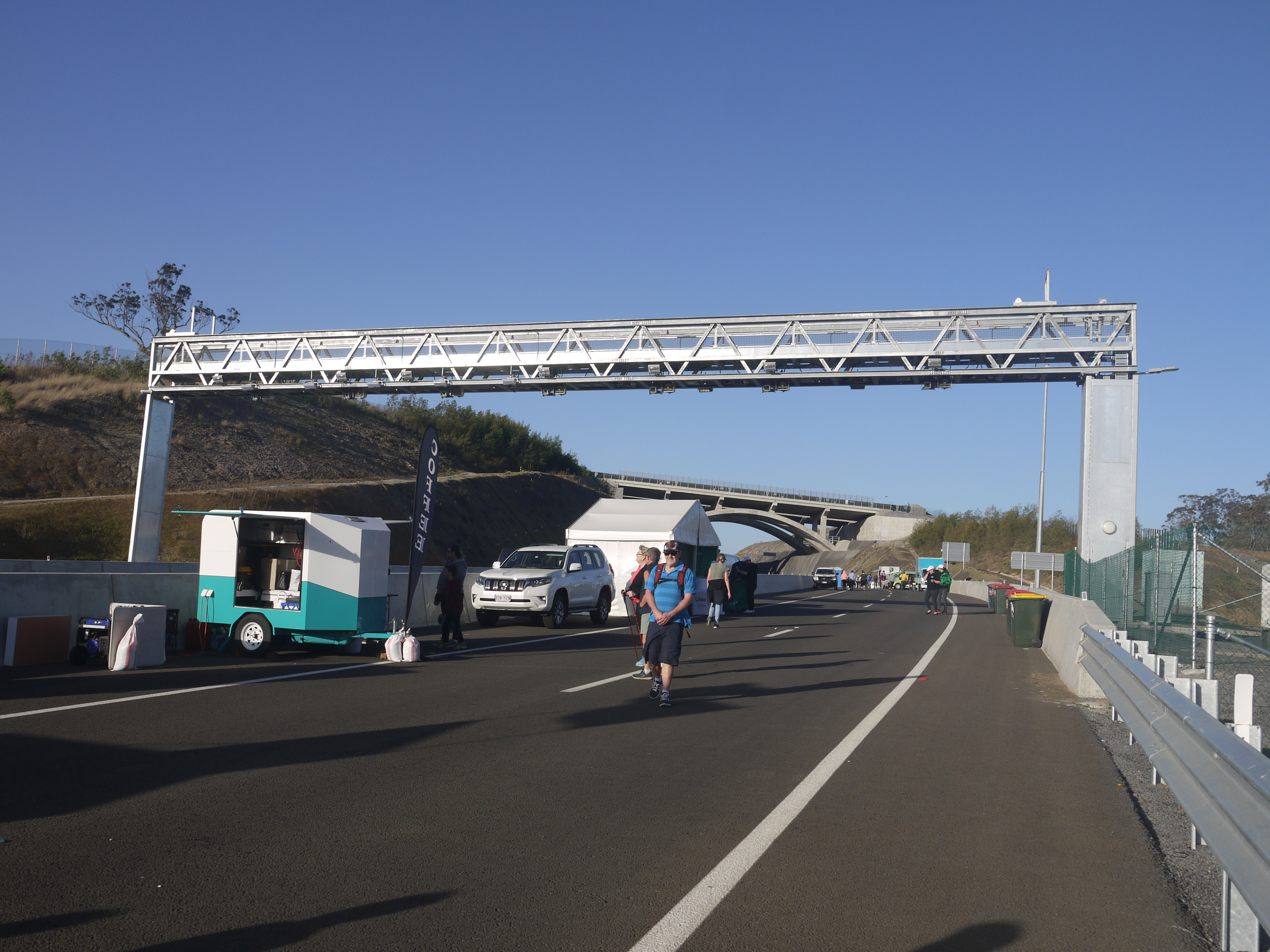
Toll Gantry on Toowoomba Bypass. Taken on Community Open Day

The Toowoomba Bypass is tolled between Mort Street and Helidon Spa, with the single toll point located just east of the Mort Street interchange near the New England Highway overpass. It is a free-flow system requiring an electronic toll tag (e-TAG). It is mandatory for heavy vehicles to use the toll road unless they have a destination in Toowoomba or Warwick.

Even though the bypass is tolled, it is owned and operated by the Department of Transport and Main Roads (TMR). Transurban Queensland provides tolling service on the bypass on behalf of TMR.

Toll prices as of 1 July 2025
Toll road	Class 1 (Motorcycles)	Class 2 (Cars)	Class 3 (Light Commercial Vehicles)	Class 4 (Heavy Commercial Vehicles)	Toll increase	Toll concessionaire	Expiry of toll concession
Toowoomba Bypass	$1.44	$2.88	$7.14	$28.62	Annually on 1 July, by CPI	Department of Transport and Main Roads (Note: The Toowoomba Bypass is owned by the government, with tolling services provided by Transurban Queensland)	–

Map showing route in yellow

== Exits ==
Location	km	mi	Destinations	Notes
Helidon Spa	0.0	0.0	Warrego Highway (A2) – Brisbane; Toowoomba Connection Road (A21) – Toowoomba	No entry from Toowoomba Connection Road eastbound and no exit to Toowoomba Connection Road westbound (except via a U-turn facility on the Warrego Highway); Toowoomba Bypass runs north–west as the continuation of the Warrego Highway (A2)
Ballard	15.1	9.4		Eastern end of Multuggerah Viaduct
Mount Kynoch	15.9	9.9		Western end of the viaduct, crossing the Main Line railway
Mount Kynoch	16.3	10.1	New England Highway (A3)	Bridges over the bypass. No entry or exit here. See Mort Street interchange below.
Harlaxton / Cranley midpoint	17.2– 17.4	10.7– 10.8		Bridge over Goombungee Road, Gowrie Creek, the Western railway line and Hermitage Road.
Cranley	17.7– 18.4	11.0– 11.4	Mort Street interchange Hermitage Road – south–east – Toowoomba (via Mort Street) north–west – Cranley	Entry from and exit to New England Highway
Cranley	20.6– 21.1	12.8– 13.1	Boundary Street	Bridge over the bypass. Eastbound entry and westbound exit.
Charlton	26.2– 27.5	16.3– 17.1	Warrego Highway (A2) – west – Oakey; Toowoomba Connection Road (A21) – east – Toowoomba	Toowoomba Bypass continues south-west as Gore Highway (A39)
Wellcamp	30.0– 31.1	18.6– 19.3	Toowoomba–Cecil Plains Road – east – Toowoomba / west – Cecil Plains, Toowoomba Wellcamp Airport	
Athol	39.4– 40.0	24.5– 24.9	Gore Highway (A39) westbound flyover. Toowoomba Athol Road (A139) – east – Toowoomba	
Athol	41.3	25.7	Gore Highway (A39)	No entry from Toowoomba Athol Road westbound
1.000 mi = 1.609 km; 1.000 km = 0.621 mi: Incomplete access; Route transition
