= Toowoomba Connection Road =

Road in Queensland, Australia

Toowoomba Connection Road Queensland
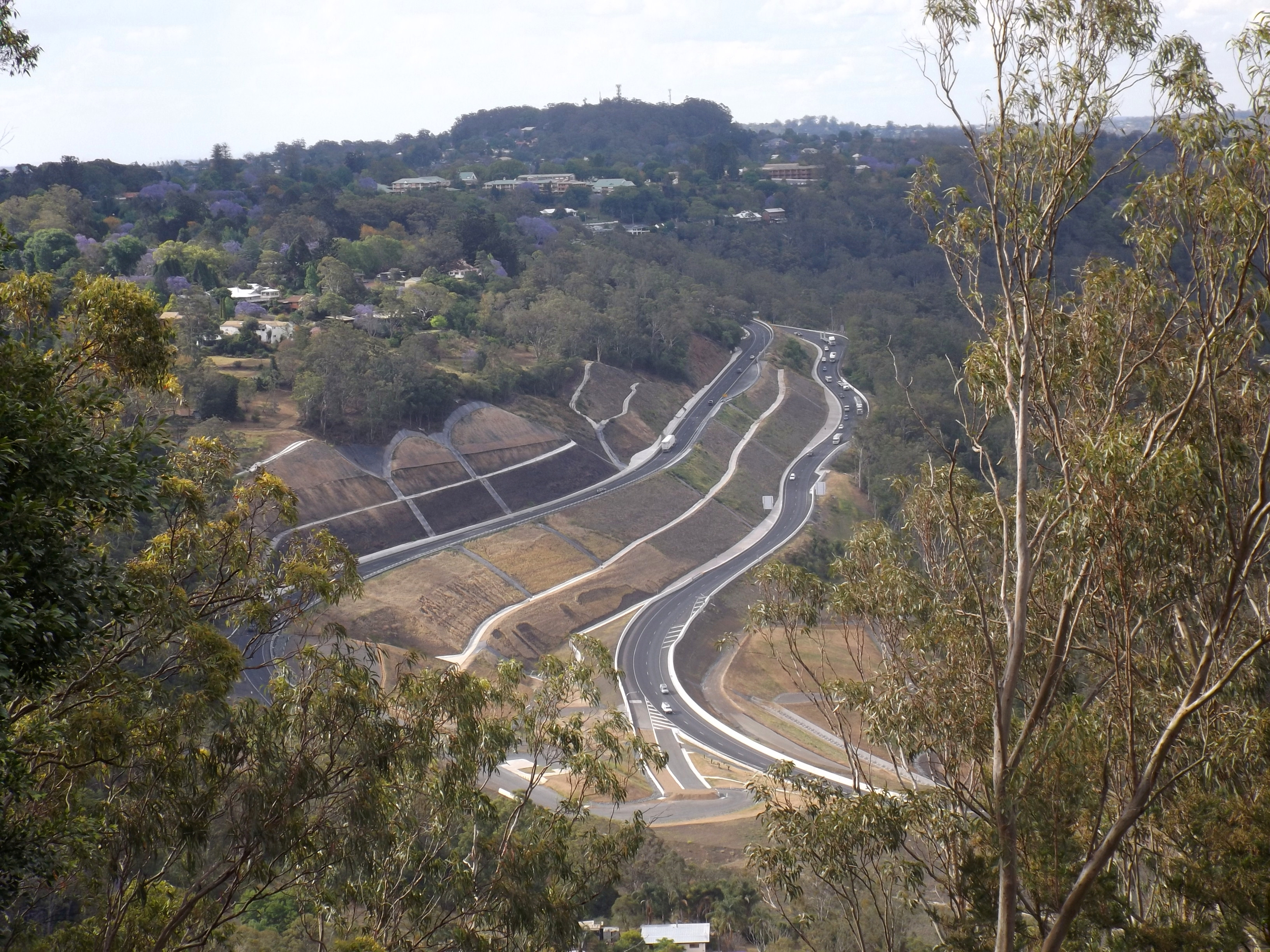
- View from Picnic Point, 2014

General information
- Type: Road
- Length: 27.3 km (17 mi)
- Route number(s): Toowoomba Connection Road (Entire length)
- Former route number: National Highway 54; National Highway A2; National Highway A2

Major junctions
- E end: Warrego Highway, Helidon Spa, Queensland
- New England Highway (State Highway A3 / State Route 85); Toowoomba Athol Road
- W end: Warrego Highway, / Gore Highway, Charlton, Queensland

Location(s)
- Major suburbs: Postmans Ridge, Withcott, Toowoomba

The Toowoomba Connection Road is a 27.3 km (17.0 mi) former section of the Warrego Highway that passes through the city of Toowoomba in Queensland, Australia. With the opening of the Toowoomba Bypass in 2019 the Warrego Highway was redirected to it, and the bypassed section of the highway was renamed Toowoomba Connection Road and assigned the route number A21.

== Route description ==
The road commences in the rural locality of Helidon Spa, where it diverges from the Warrego Highway, providing a more direct route to the Toowoomba CBD. It passes through the rural localities of Postmans Ridge and Withcott before ascending the Great Dividing Range to Toowoomba. It passes between the CBD and South Toowoomba before turning north and then north-west through the suburbs of Newtown and Wilsonton. It then passes through outer suburbs to the rural locality of Charlton, where it ends at an intersection with the Warrego Highway and the Gore Highway.

== History ==
In January 2011, the Warrego Highway was extensively damaged where it crossed the Toowoomba Range. This included land slips, shoulder and embankment erosion, the erosion of drains and damaged rock fall netting. The road wasn't fully repaired with all four lanes open until September 2011.

The Toowoomba Bypass was completed in September 2019 and bypasses the urban area of Toowoomba and provides a better crossing of the Great Dividing Range. Warrego Highway (A2) was rerouted via the bypass between Helidon Spa (in the east) and the interchange at Charlton (in the west). The original section of Warrego Highway through Toowoomba was renamed Toowoomba Connection Road (A21).

=== The "Toll Bar" ===
The section of the Warrego Highway from Withcott to the top of the Toowoomba Range was first opened in January, 1855 as a toll road, named Toll Bar Road. The toll collection point was marked by a bar across the road and a fence on either side. The upper section of Toll Bar Road was initially unsealed and very steep, with grades up to 14%. This road remained in use until December, 1939, when work on a new, less steep, upper section was completed. Part of the upper section is now a suburban street named Old Toll Bar Road. The term "The Toll Bar" is sometimes used by locals to describe the current road, and it is also used in the mapping software distributed with Navman GPS systems.

== Upgrades ==
=== James Street culverts ===
A project under the Warrego Highway funding arrangements to upgrade two culverts in James Street (now part of this road) at a cost of $21.1 million, was completed in December 2020.

=== Hursley Road intersection ===
A project to develop a business case for the upgrade of the Hursley Road intersection, at a cost of $500,000, was to start in November 2021.

== Major intersections ==
LGA	Location	km	mi	Destinations	Notes
Lockyer	Helidon Spa	0.0	0.0	Warrego Highway (A2) – east – Brisbane – north–west (Toowoomba Bypass) – Toowoomba (via Mort Street Interchange), Dalby, Goondiwindi	No entry to Warrego Highway westbound from Toowoomba Connection Road eastbound, and no entry to Toowoomba Connection Road westbound from Warrego Highway eastbound (except via a U-turn facility further east on the Warrego Highway)
Toowoomba	Toowoomba	15.1	9.4	New England Highway (State Route A3) / Hume Street (State Route 85) – north – North Toowoomba; Hume Street – south – Centenary Heights	Eastern concurrency terminus with New England Highway and State Route 85.
Toowoomba	Toowoomba	15.5	9.6	New England Highway (State Route A3) – south – South Toowoomba; Ruthven Street – north – North Toowoomba	Western concurrency terminus with New England Highway.
Toowoomba	Newtown / Harristown midpoint	17.8	11.1	Toowoomba Athol Road (A139) / Anzac Avenue (State Route 85) – south–west – Athol; Anzac Avenue – north – Newtown	Western concurrency terminus with State Route 85.
Toowoomba	Charlton	27.3	17.0	Warrego Highway (A2) – north–east (Toowoomba Bypass) – Toowoomba (via Mort Street Interchange), Brisbane – north–west – Dalby; Gore Highway (National Highway A39) – south – Goondiwindi	
1.000 mi = 1.609 km; 1.000 km = 0.621 mi: Concurrency terminus; Incomplete access

== See also ==
List of road routes in Queensland
