= Helidon Spa =

- Suburb
- Interactive map of Helidon Spa
- Coordinates: 27.5436°S 152.0894°E
- Country: Australia
- State: Queensland
- LGA: Lockyer Valley Region
- Location: 4.4 km (2.7 mi) W of Helidon; 18.5 km (11.5 mi) E of Toowoomba; 19.9 km (12.4 mi) W of Gatton; 110 km (68 mi) W of Brisbane

Government
  - State electorate: Lockyer
  - Federal division: Wright

Area
  - Total: 15.5 km^{2} (6.0 sq mi)

Population
  - Total: 504 (2021 census)
  - Density: 32.52/km^{2} (84.2/sq mi)
- Postcode: 4344
Suburbs around Helidon Spa
Postmans Ridge	Lockyer	Helidon
Blanchview	Helidon Spa	Helidon
Derrymore	Iredale	Iredale

Helidon Spa is a rural locality in the Lockyer Valley Region, Queensland, Australia. In the 2021 census, Helidon Spa had a population of 504 people.

== Geography ==
Lockyer Creek forms much of the northern and eastern boundaries. Monkey Water Holes Creek forms most of the southern boundary before joining Lockyer Creek near the south-eastern corner. Rocky Creek flows through the locality from west to north, where it joins Lockyer. Creek.

The Warrego Highway enters the locality from the east (Helidon) and continues west, splitting into the Toowoomba Connection Road and the Toowoomba Bypass, which both exit the locality to the west (Postmans Ridge) with the Toowoomba Connection Road being to the south of the Toowoomba Bypass.

The land use is a mix of grazing on native vegetation and rural residential housing.

== Demographics ==
In the 2016 census, Helidon Spa had a population of 538 people.

In the 2021 census, Helidon Spa had a population of 504 people.

== Education ==
There are no schools in Helidon Spa. The nearest government primary schools are Helidon State School in neighbouring Helidon to the east and Withcott State School in Withcott to the west. The nearest government secondary schools are Lockyer District State High School in Gatton to the east and Centenary Heights State High School in Centenary Heights, Toowoomba, to the south-west. There are also non-government schools in Gatton and Toowoomba.
