= Postmans Ridge, Queensland =

Postmans Ridge
- Suburb
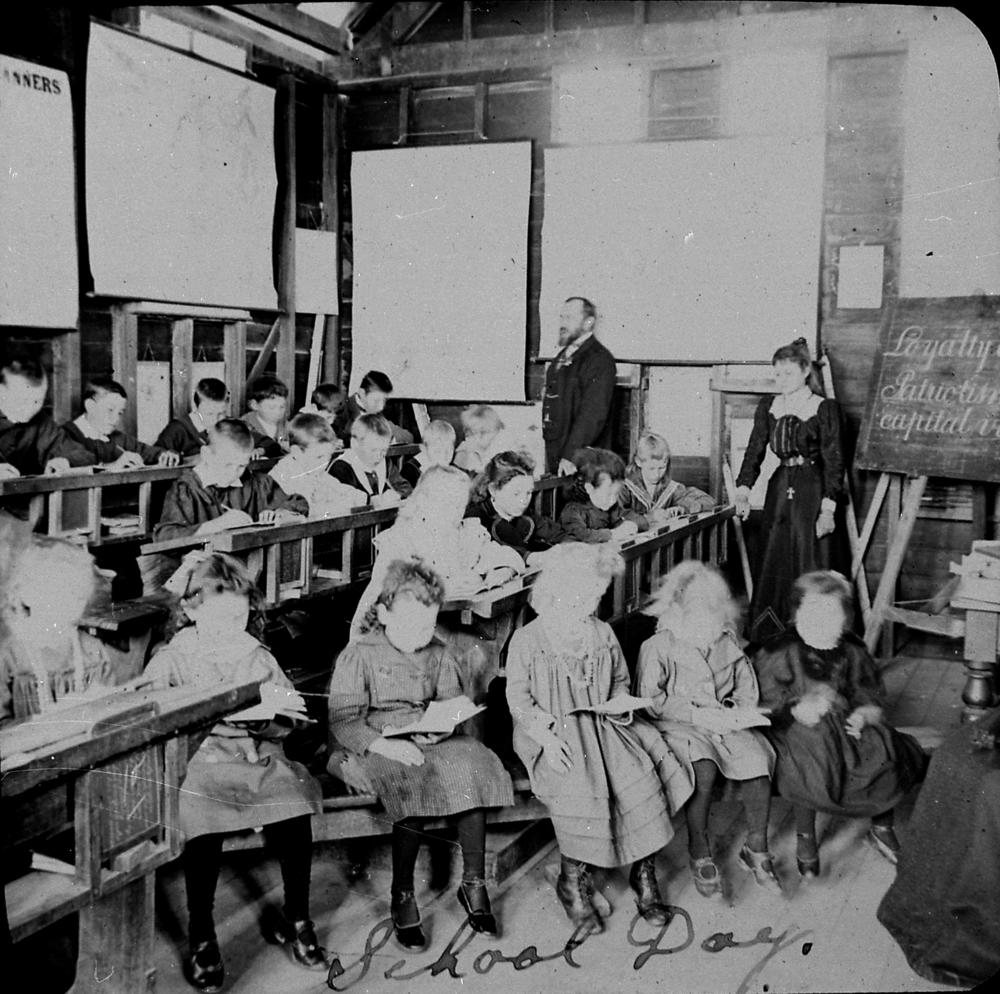
- Interior of the school room at Postmans Ridge, circa 1902

- Interactive map of Postmans Ridge
- Coordinates: 27.5286°S 152.0555°E
- Country: Australia
- State: Queensland
- LGA: Lockyer Valley Region
- Location: 13.7 km (8.5 mi) E of Toowoomba; 27.6 km (17.1 mi) W of Gatton; 117 km (73 mi) W of Brisbane

Government
  - State electorate: Lockyer
  - Federal division: Wright

Area
  - Total: 16.8 km^{2} (6.5 sq mi)

Population
  - Total: 352 (2021 census)
  - Density: 20.95/km^{2} (54.27/sq mi)
- Time zone: UTC+10:00 (AEST)
- Postcode: 4352
Suburbs around Postmans Ridge
Withcott	Lockyer	Lockyer
Withcott	Postmans Ridge	Helidon Spa
Withcott	Blanchview	Helidon Spa

Postmans Ridge is a rural locality in the Lockyer Valley Region, Queensland, Australia. In the 2021 census, Postmans Ridge had a population of 352 people.

== Geography ==
Rocky Creek forms part of the south-western boundary before flowing through from west to east.

The Warrego Highway runs through from south-east to north-west, and the Toowoomba Connection Road runs from south-east to south-west. Murphys Creek Road enters from the north.

Wards Hill is in the north-west of the locality (27.5101°S 152.0342°E) rising to 424 metres (1,391 ft) above sea level.

The land use is predominantly grazing on native vegetation and rural residential housing with some crop growing.

== History ==
The locality takes its name from a mailman who was murdered in the early coaching days.

Postman's Ridge State School opened on 4 February 1878 on land provided by Daniel Connole. It closed on 28 February 1937. The school was on the northern side of Murphys Creek Road (approx 27.53394°S 152.06179°E).

== Demographics ==
In the 2016 census, Postmans Ridge had a population of 398 people.

In the 2021 census, Postmans Ridge had a population of 352 people.

== Education ==
There are no schools in Postmans Ridge. The nearest government primary schools are Withcott State School in neighbouring Withcott to the south-west, Helidon State School in Helidon to the east, and Murphy's Creek State School in Murphys Creek to the north. The nearest government secondary school is Centenary Heights State High School in Centenary Heights, Toowoomba.

== Amenities ==
Postmans Ridge Pioneers Memorial Hall is at 199 Murphys Creek Road (27.53404°N 152.06279°E). It was built on land that was part of the original land grant made to Daniel Connole and given to the local community.
