= Lockyer, Queensland =

Lockyer
- Suburb
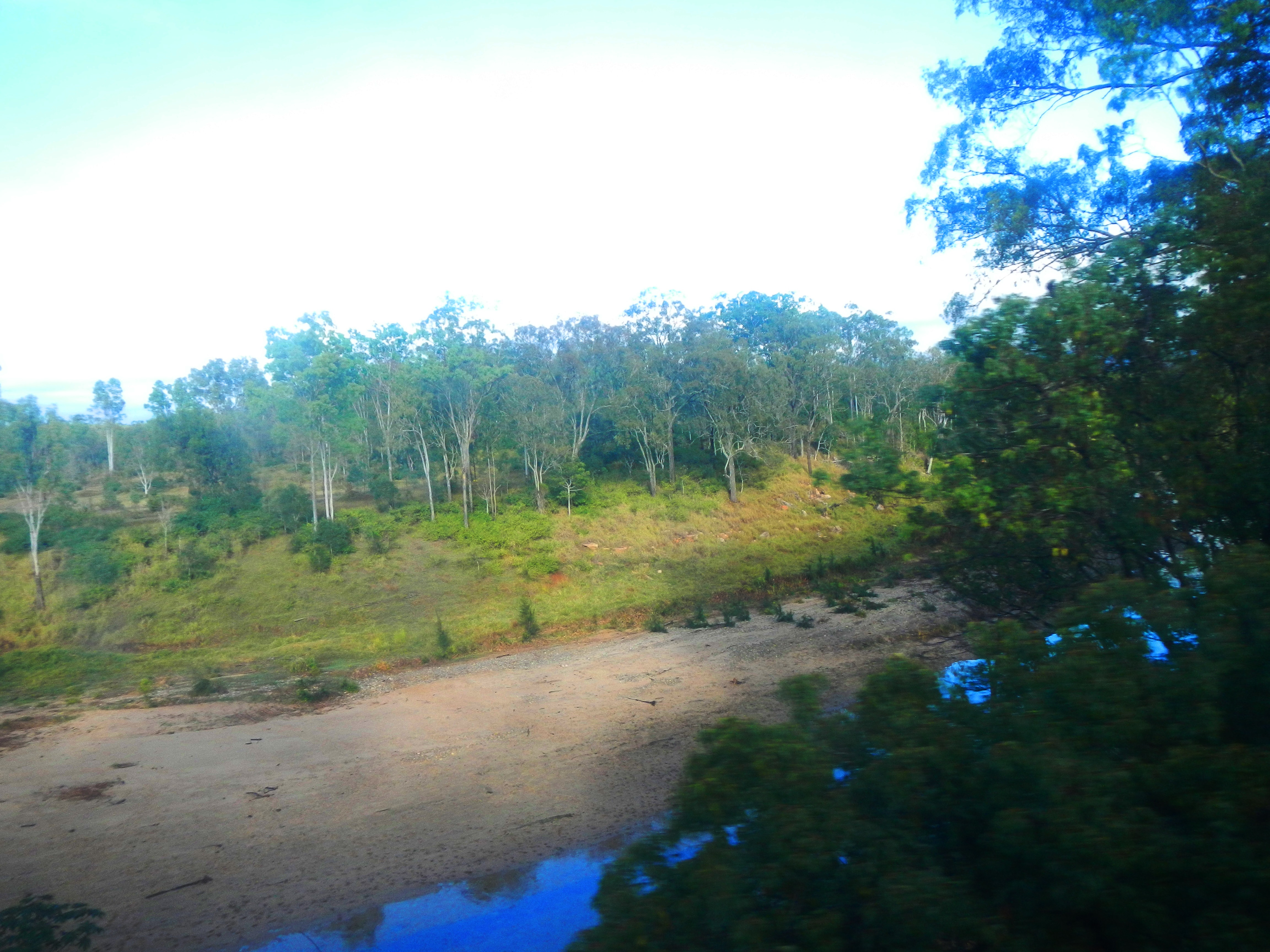
- Lockyer, 2013

- Interactive map of Lockyer
- Coordinates: 27.5063°S 152.0691°E
- Country: Australia
- State: Queensland
- LGA: Lockyer Valley Region
- Location: 16.7 km (10.4 mi) ENE of Toowoomba; 27.1 km (16.8 mi) W of Gatton; 116 km (72 mi) W of Brisbane

Government
  - State electorate: Lockyer
  - Federal division: Wright

Area
  - Total: 17.9 km^{2} (6.9 sq mi)

Population
  - Total: 89 (2021 census)
  - Density: 4.97/km^{2} (12.88/sq mi)
- Time zone: UTC+10:00 (AEST)
- Postcode: 4344
Suburbs around Lockyer
Murphys Creek	Upper Lockyer	Helidon
Withcott	Lockyer	Helidon
Withcott	Postmans Ridge	Helidon Spa

Lockyer is a rural locality in the Lockyer Valley Region, Queensland, Australia. In the 2021 census, Lockyer had a population of 89 people.

== Geography ==
Lockyer railway station is on the Main Line railway (27.5076°S 152.0839°E). Murphys Creek Road runs through from north to south.

== History ==
Jagara (also known as Jagera, Yagara, Yugarabul, Yuggera and Yuggerabul) is one of the Aboriginal languages of South-East Queensland. There is some uncertainty over the status of Jagara as a language, dialect or perhaps a group or clan within the local government boundaries of Ipswich City Council, Lockyer Regional Council and the Somerset Regional Council.

The locality takes its name from Lockyer Creek, believed to have been named by explorer Allan Cunningham in July 1829. It was named after Major Edmund Lockyer who explored the Brisbane River in 1825.

Lockyer Creek Provisional School opened circa 1891, being renamed Lockyer Provisional School in 1892. It closed in 1915.

Lockyer Upper State School (also known as Upper Lockyer State School) opened on 3 July 1939. It closed on 27 September 1968. It was on the western side of Murphys Creek Road at the junction with Lockyer Siding Road (27.5022°S 152.0717°E). Despite the name, it is now within the locality boundaries of Lockyer.

== Demographics ==
In the 2016 census, Lockyer had a population of 95 people.

In the 2021 census, Lockyer had a population of 89 people.

== Heritage listings ==
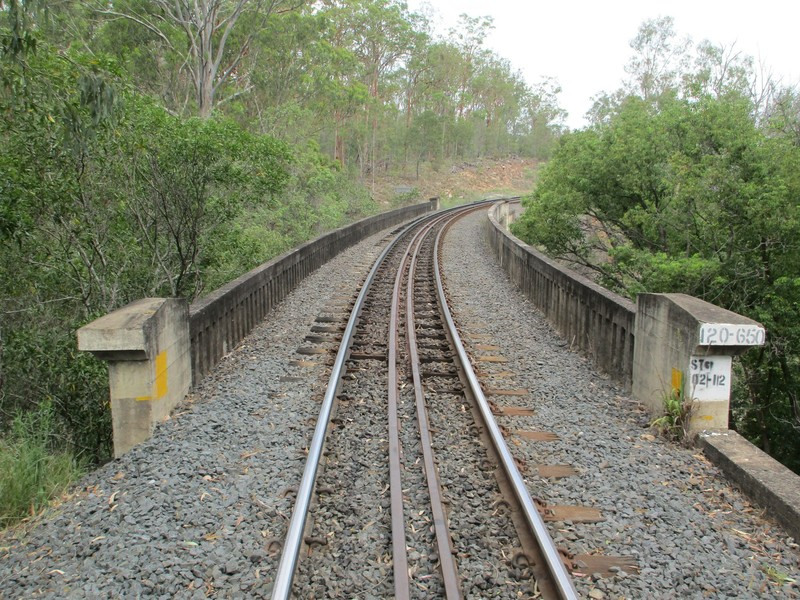
Lockyer Creek Railway Bridge, 2016

Lockyer has a number of heritage-listed sites, including:

- Lockyer Creek Railway Bridge (Lockyer), Main Line railway (27.518°S 152.0885°E)

== Education ==
There are no schools in Lockyer. The nearest government primary schools are Murphy's Creek State School in neighbouring Murphys Creek to the north-west, Helidon State School in neighbouring Helidon to the south-east, and Withcott State School in neighbouring Withcott to the south-west. The nearest government secondary school is Centenary Heights State High School in Centenary Heights, Toowoomba, to the south-west.
