= Glen Alpine, Toowoomba =

Glen Alpine
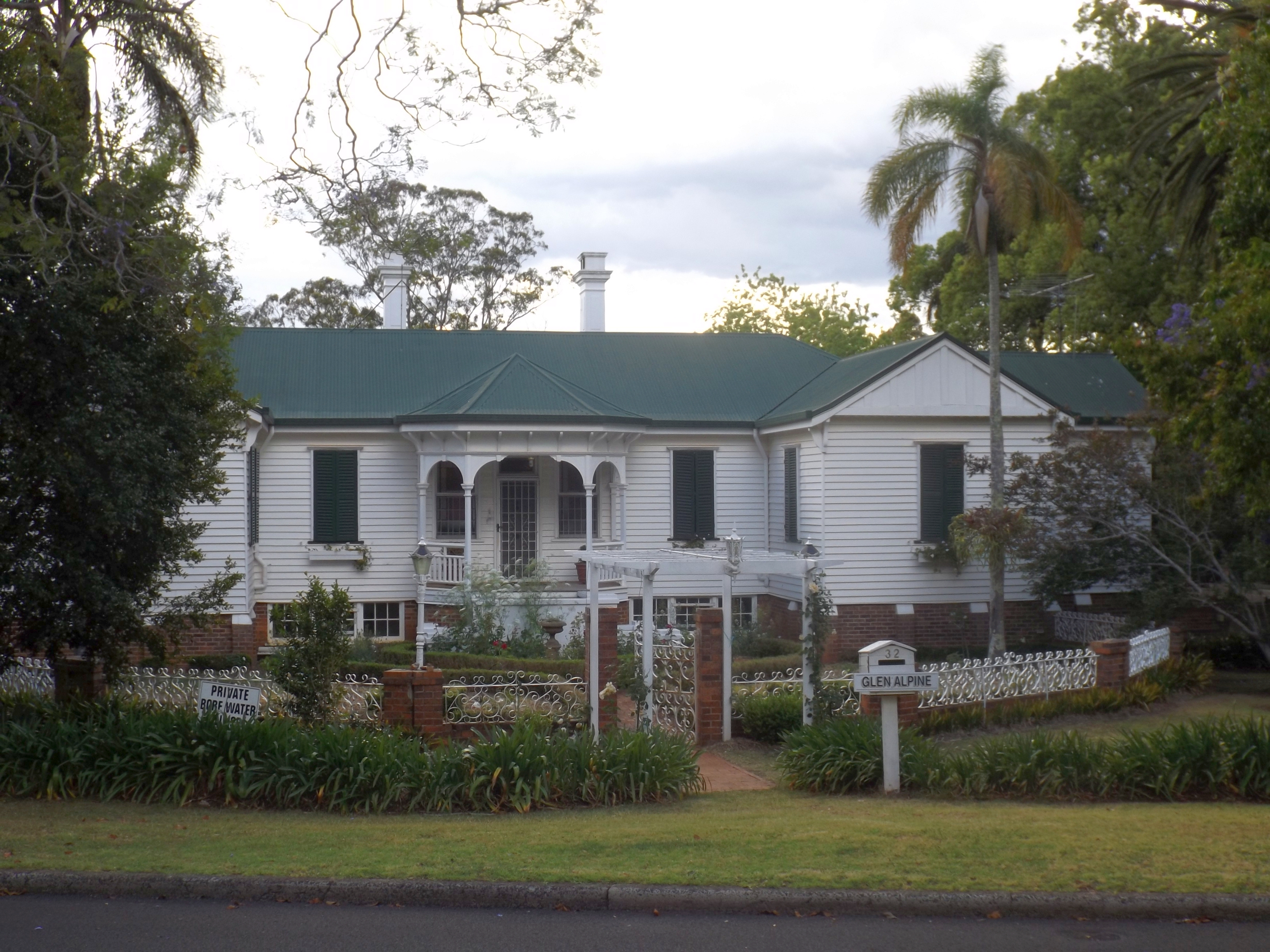
- Front of the residence, 2014

- Location within Queensland Location within Australia
- 27.5613°S 151.9776°E
- Location: 32–36 East Street, Redwood, Toowoomba, Toowoomba Region, Queensland, Australia

History
- Design period: 1914–1919 (World War I)
- Built: c. 1918

Site notes
- Architect: Harry Marks

Queensland Heritage Register
- Official name: Glen Alpine
- Type: state heritage (landscape, built)
- Designated: 11 June 1993
- Reference no.: 600842
- Significant period: 1910s (fabric); 1910s–1950s (historical)
- Significant components: garage, carriage way/drive, views from, service corridor, pond/s – garden, fernery, trees/plantings, wall/s – retaining, wall/s – garden, garden/grounds, residential accommodation – main house

Glen Alpine is a heritage-listed villa at 32–36 East Street, Redwood, Toowoomba, Toowoomba Region, Queensland, Australia. It was designed by Toowoomba architect Harry Marks and built c. 1918. It was added to the Queensland Heritage Register on 11 June 1993.

== History ==
Glen Alpine is a two-storey timber residence which is believed to have been built c. 1918 for Albert Rowbotham, of the Toowoomba firm Rowbotham and Co., bootmakers. The house was possibly designed by prominent Toowoomba architect, Harry J. Marks.

The land was granted to Thomas Perkins in 1875, then acquired by William Shaw in 1876. It appears that there may have been a previous dwelling also named Glen Alpine on the same site, possibly as early as 1882–83 when Richard Cobb, a Toowoomba builder and contractor acquired the land. Cobb was recorded as living at "The Range" between 1883 and 1887. The land was acquired by David Laughland Brown of the softgoods firm Messrs. D. L. Brown and Co in 1887. Between 1887 and 1910 there were various references in the Post Office Directories and Toowoomba newspapers to Brown and his family at Glen Alpine, Main Range. Rowbotham acquired the land in 1918. The house was purchased in 1931 by Neal Macrossan, then a Barrister-at-law and later a Chief Justice of the Supreme Court. It appears that Neal Macrossan and his wife Eileen (daughter of T.C. Beirne) purchased Glen Alpine as a holiday home, indicative of the way in which Toowoomba was viewed as a "summer resort" for heat-oppressed coastal Queenslanders (including the Queensland Governors), and a weekend escape for day trippers from Brisbane.

A swimming pool was built at Glen Alpine in 1931, designed by William Hodgen Jnr. It was one of the first domestic swimming pools built in Toowoomba.

Glen Alpine was temporarily occupied by the Australian Army, c. 1940–42 during World War II.

Macrossan died in 1955 and his daughter purchased Glen Alpine from his estate in 1957.

== Description ==
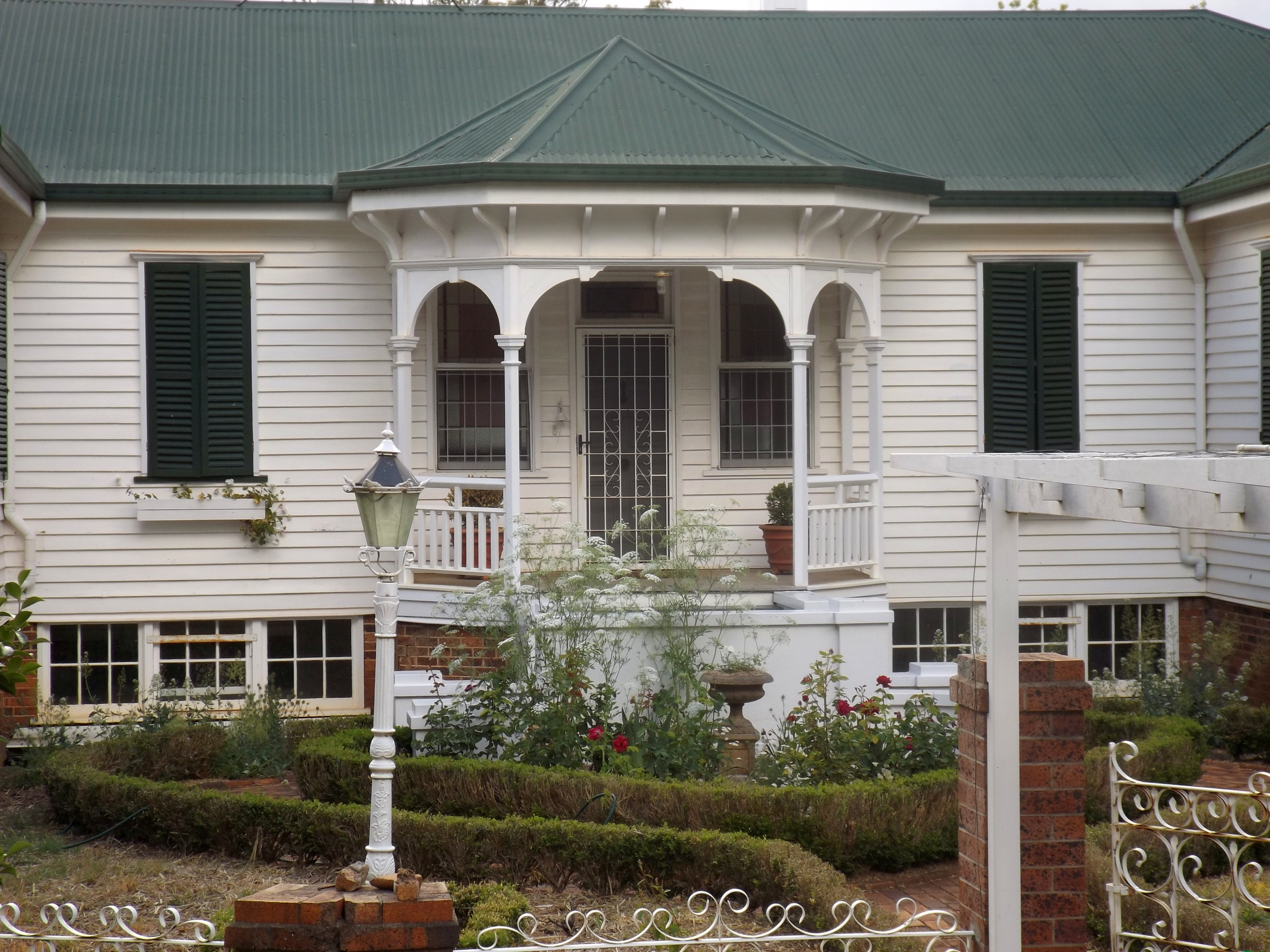
Closeup, 2014

Glen Alpine, built into an eastern slope on the edge of Main Range, appears single-storeyed from the west, on the East Street frontage, but is two-storeyed from the east. The timber residence, the grounds of which fall away to the east and to Redwood Park beyond, faces east to the expansive view of the Brisbane Valley and Table Top mountain.

The building has a hipped ribbed metal roof with projecting gables and verandahs to both levels around the southeast and northeast, with chamferboards to verandah walls and weatherboards to exposed walls. The gables have flat sheeting with timber cover strips and eave brackets. Both the east and west elevations are symmetrical.

The west elevation, sitting on a brick base with exposed piers, has projecting gabled rooms to the southwest and northwest with shuttered sash windows and a central projecting bay-shaped porch. The porch has a hipped roof, eave brackets, batten railing and arched timber brackets with a concrete stair to a landing which splits into twin steps to the ground. The panelled timber entry door has a fanlight and two side sash windows with rose and clear glass with red glass borders. Low level windows in the brick base, to either side of the porch, light a service corridor behind.

The east elevation has a central projecting gabled bay. The upper floor of this bay has a large fixed picture window, divided into three and broken into smaller square panes, with a red glass border, and the ground floor has arched timber casement windows. These windows have metal hoods with deep curved timber brackets.

French doors with divided fanlights open onto the verandahs which have timber posts with batten railing to the upper floor and solid timber arched valance and a concrete floor to the ground. The north end of the upper and lower verandahs, and a section of the upper south verandah, have been enclosed with glazing and timber panels.

The south elevation has an enclosed gabled room to the upper floor with an arched timber valance and casement windows. This sits on the brick base, the rear retaining wall of which continues south forming a three car garage with a fernery between. The garage has an extended timber front and a skillion roof.

Internally, the timber floors are mostly carpeted and the tongue and groove walls and boarded ceilings are painted. The west entry has an arched timber colonnade to the stair and north bay, with a wide hallway running north-south on the west side of the building. At either end of this hallway is a door with patterned glass fanlight and sidelights. Bedrooms, the north room of which has early wallpaper and others have Masonite cladding, open off this hallway with the bathroom at the north end. The stair has timber fretwork railings and leads to the ground floor.

The ground floor has a concrete floor service corridor running under the upper hallway, with a brick retaining wall to the west and a single skin timber wall to the eastern rooms. A sitting room is located on the southeast with a remodelled kitchen and sunroom are on the northeast.

The grounds include a fenced garden to the west entry with a low brick pier and wrought iron fence; the remains of a carriage drive entering from the southwest and sweeping around the north and east of the building to the garages at the south; a fish pond with brick paving to the east; mature trees along the south, west and north boundaries and sections of hedges along the east.

== Heritage listing ==
Glen Alpine was listed on the Queensland Heritage Register on 11 June 1993 having satisfied the following criteria.

The place is important in demonstrating the evolution or pattern of Queensland's history.

The house and grounds of Glen Alpine, erected c. 1918, are important in demonstrating the pattern of Queensland's history, in particular the development of the Toowoomba Range as a prestigious residential area.

The place is important because of its aesthetic significance.

It exhibits a range of aesthetic characteristics valued by the Toowoomba community, in particular the formal symmetry of the building and its siting in relation to the view to the east, and the contribution of the building and grounds to the streetscape of East Street and to the Toowoomba townscape.

The place has a special association with the life or work of a particular person, group or organisation of importance in Queensland's history.

It has special association with the life of Chief Justice Neal Macrossan as his Toowoomba holiday house.
