= Blanchview, Queensland =

Blanchview
- Suburb
- Interactive map of Blanchview
- Coordinates: 27.5766°S 152.0308°E
- Country: Australia
- State: Queensland
- LGA: Lockyer Valley Region
- Location: 13.5 km (8.4 mi) E of Toowoomba; 29.8 km (18.5 mi) W of Gatton; 120 km (75 mi) W of Brisbane

Government
  - State electorate: Lockyer
  - Federal division: Wright

Area
  - Total: 18.1 km^{2} (7.0 sq mi)

Population
  - Total: 202 (2021 census)
  - Density: 11.16/km^{2} (28.90/sq mi)
- Time zone: UTC+10:00 (AEST)
- Postcode: 4352
Suburbs around Blanchview
Withcott	Postmans Ridge	Helidon Spa
Rangeville	Blanchview	Derrymore
Rangeville	Silver Ridge	Silver Ridge

Blanchview is a rural locality in the Lockyer Valley Region, Queensland, Australia. In the 2021 census, Blanchview had a population of 202 people.

== Geography ==
The southern half of Blanchview features two mountains. In the west the elevations rise to 600 metres (2,000 ft) surrounding the peak of Mount Tabletop which is located in the adjacent suburb of Rangeville. Across a narrow valley to the east, Mount Davidson rises to similar heights. The steep slopes of both mountains have remained naturally vegetated.

Mount Davidson (also known as Hays Peak) is in the south-east corner of the locality (27.5970°S 152.0290°E), rising to 618 metres (2,028 ft).

== History ==
The name Blanchview is a manufactured name, derived from the name of land owner Ernest Blanchard. Located 5 kilometres (3.1 mi) south of Withcott, it was previously known as Monkey Waterholes (also written as Monkey Water Holes). However, his son, John "Colin" Blanchard, told of a Toowoomba town councillor in early 1900s suggesting the name Blanchview when visiting the Blanchard farm house that was between the school and the church, both on land donated by Ernest Blanchard.

Monkey Waterholes Provisional School opened on 7 July 1890. It became Monkey Waterholes State School in 1909 and was renamed Blanch View State School in 1913. Blanchview State School closed in 1965. The school was on a 2-acre (0.81 ha) reserve within present-day 358 Blanchview Road. The site is marked by a plaque (27.5719°S 152.0354°E). The school building was relocated to another site and is used as a farm building.

Monkey Waterholes Methodist Church opened on the weekend of 2-3 December 1899, although Primitive Methodist services had been held in the district (probably in private homes) since at least 1895. The church was at 327 Blanchview Road (corner Church Road, 27.5700°S 152.0379°E). Services were advertised at the church until 1933. Later it passed into private ownership and was converted into a residence.

== Demographics ==
In the 2011 census, Blanchview had a population of 229 people.

In the 2016 census, Blanchview had a population of 191 people.

In the 2021 census, Blanchview had a population of 202 people.

== Education ==
There are no schools in Blanchview. The nearest government primary schools are Withcott State School in neighbouring Withcott to the north-west, Rangeville State School in neighbouring Rangeville to the west, and Gabbinbar State School in Centenary Heights to the south-west. The nearest government secondary school is Centenary Heights State High School in Centenary Heights.
