= Redwood Park, Toowoomba =

Park in Queensland, Australia

Coordinates: 27.562°S 151.991°E

Redwood Park is located on the escarpment of the Great Dividing Range in Redwood, Toowoomba, Queensland, Australia.

== Facilities ==
Redwood Park is a huge bushland park, covering over 200 hectares (490 acres). It has many walking, horse-riding and mountain-bike trails and a picnic area in the bushland.

== History ==
In 2020 Redwood Park was nominated for Heritage Listing by Scot McPhie. The Toowoomba Regional Council opposed the listing. In March 2021 the Queensland Government announced all of Redwood Park would not be heritage listed, but Eagles Nest Camp, a depression era itinerant workers camp located within Redwood, would be Heritage listed
