= David Cousins (disambiguation) =

David Cousins (born 1942) is an RAF commander.

David Cousins may also refer to:

- Dave Cousins (1940–2025), English musician, leader, singer and songwriter of Strawbs
- Dave Cousins (archer) (born 1977), American compound archer
