= Warrego Highway =

Highway in Queensland

Warrego Highway Queensland
- Warrego Highway (green on black)

General information
- Type: Highway
- Length: 715 km (444 mi)
- Route number(s): National Highway M2 (Ipswich Motorway – Pine Mountain Road, Brassall); National Highway A2 (Pine Mountain Road, Brassall – Helidon Spa); National Highway A2 (Helidon Spa – Cranley); National Highway A2 (Cranley – Landsborough Highway); Alternate National Highway A2 (Landsborough Highway – Mitchell Highway)
- Former route number: National Highway 54; National Highway A2

Major junctions
- SE end: Ipswich Motorway / Cunningham Highway, Ipswich, Queensland
- Brisbane Valley Highway (State Highway A17); New England Highway (State Highway A3 / State Route 85); Gore Highway (National Highway A39 / State Route 85); Bunya Highway (State Route 49); Moonie Highway (State Route 49); Leichhardt Highway (State Highway A5); Carnarvon Highway (State Highway A7); Landsborough Highway (National Highway A2)
- NW end: Mitchell Highway, Charleville, Queensland

Location(s)
- Major settlements: Toowoomba, Dalby, Miles, Roma, Mitchell, Morven

Highway system
- Highways in Australia; National Highway • Freeways in Australia; Highways in Queensland

The Warrego Highway is located in southern Queensland, Australia. It connects coastal centres to the south western areas of the state, and is approximately 715 km in length. It takes its name from the Warrego River, which is the endpoint of the highway. The entire highway is part of the National Highway system linking Darwin and Brisbane: formerly National Highway 54, Queensland began to convert to the alphanumeric system much of Australia had adopted in the early-2000s and this road is now designated as National Highway A2.

== State-controlled road ==
Warrego Highway is a state-controlled road, divided into seven sections for administrative and funding purposes. Six of the seven sections (numbers 18A to 18F) are part of the National Highway, while section 18G is a regional road. The sections are:

- 18A – Ipswich to Toowoomba
- 18B – Toowoomba to Dalby
- 18C – Dalby to Miles
- 18D – Miles to Roma
- 18E – Roma to Mitchell
- 18F – Mitchell to Morven
- 18G – Morven to Charleville

State-controlled roads that intersect with the highway are listed in the main article.

== Route description ==
The highway commences at the end of the M2 Ipswich Motorway, near Ipswich and runs to Helidon Spa, at the foot of the Great Dividing Range. From there it follows the Toowoomba Bypass to Charlton, west of Toowoomba. The Warrego then crosses the Darling Downs, bypassing the town of Oakey and then passing through the towns of Dalby, Chinchilla and Miles, in the Western Downs. The highway continues through the towns of Roma and Mitchell in the Maranoa Region of South West Queensland. After Morven, the A2 Route continues north–west along the Landsborough Highway, with the western turnoff continuing the Warrego Highway down to its terminus at Charleville.

The section of highway between Dinmore and Charlton is mostly motorway grade (Brassall to Helidon Spa is currently a dual carriageway, with plans to upgrade to motorway status); a four-lane divided highway with motorway-style on-ramps and off-ramps. At Kingsthorpe the highway merges from 4 to 2 lanes (however, throughout 2017–2019, the highway was planned to be duplicated up until Oakey) Then, the highway mostly continues in a straight line with minimal turns. At Dalby, the highway briefly returns to 4 lanes (where a longer stretch of the highway was planned to be duplicated in 2017). The Warrego then continues as a rural 2 lane highway, until Charleville.

=== Terrain ===
The Warrego Highway's lowest point along its length is 3.69 m just east of where it crosses the Bremer River near Ipswich, and its highest elevation is at the top of the Great Dividing Range on the Toowoomba Bypass.

=== Speed zones ===
- Ipswich Motorway – Blacksoil 100 km/h
- Blacksoil – Toowoomba Bypass merge 100 km/h, with a drop to 80 km/h and/or 60 km/h through some towns
- Great Dividing Range (Toowoomba Bypass to Charlton) 80 km/h to 100 km/h
- Charlton – Kingsthorpe 90 km/h
- Kingsthorpe – Dalby 100 km/h except through Jondaryan, which is 80 km/h.
- Dalby – 60 km/h
- Dalby – Chinchilla 100 km/h except running through towns, which speeds can drop to 60 km/h
- Chinchilla – Charleville 110 km/h except running through towns, which speeds can drop to 60 km/h

=== Towns along the route ===
Approximate road distances (in kilometres) of towns from Brisbane along the highway

From east to west, the highway passes through or close to the cities and major towns of:

- Ipswich (Bypassed)
- Gatton (Bypassed)
- Toowoomba (Bypassed)
- Oakey (Bypassed)
- Dalby
- Chinchilla
- Miles
- Roma
- Mitchell
- Morven
- Charleville

== Gallery ==
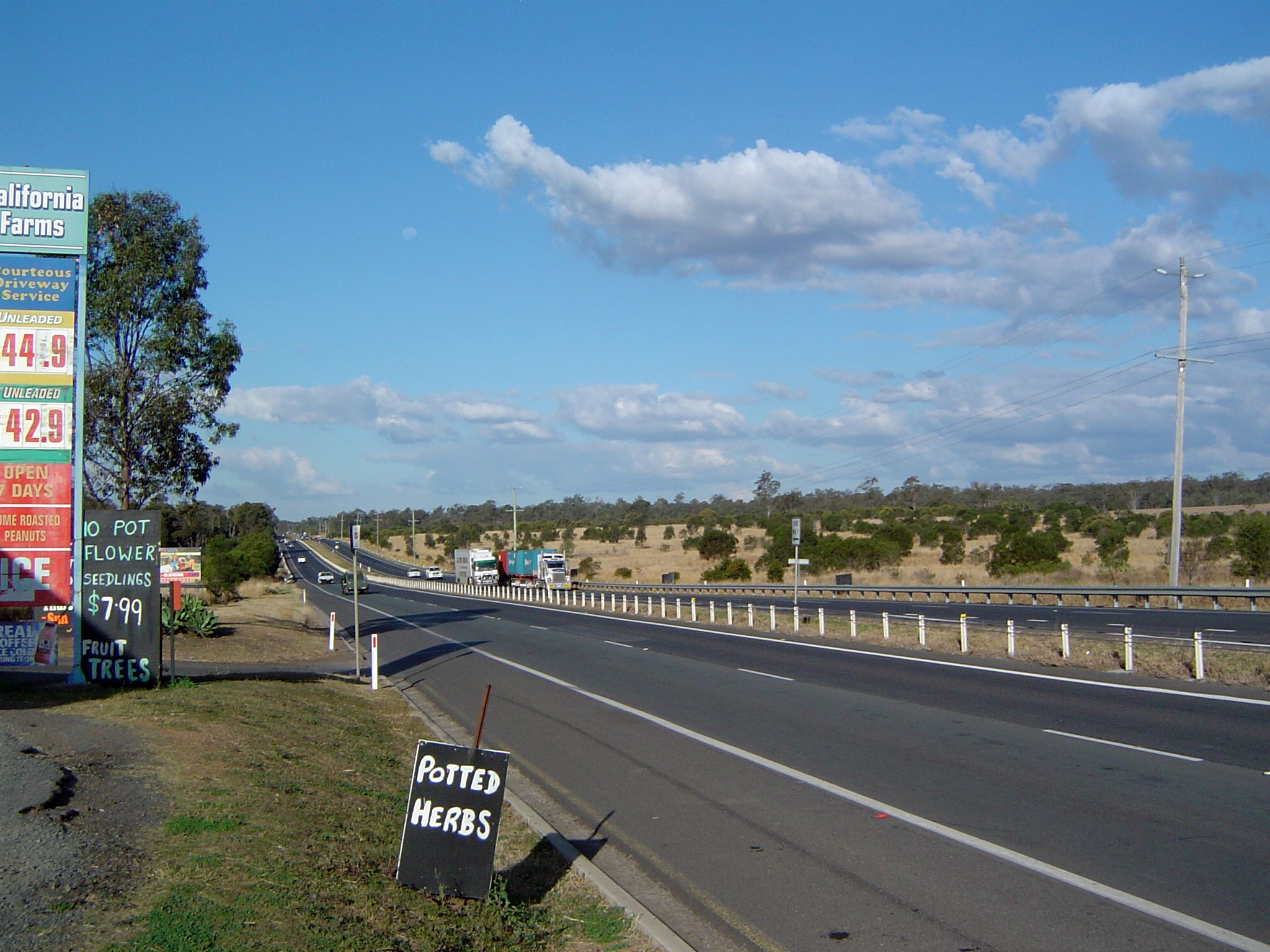
Highway at Haigslea, 2014

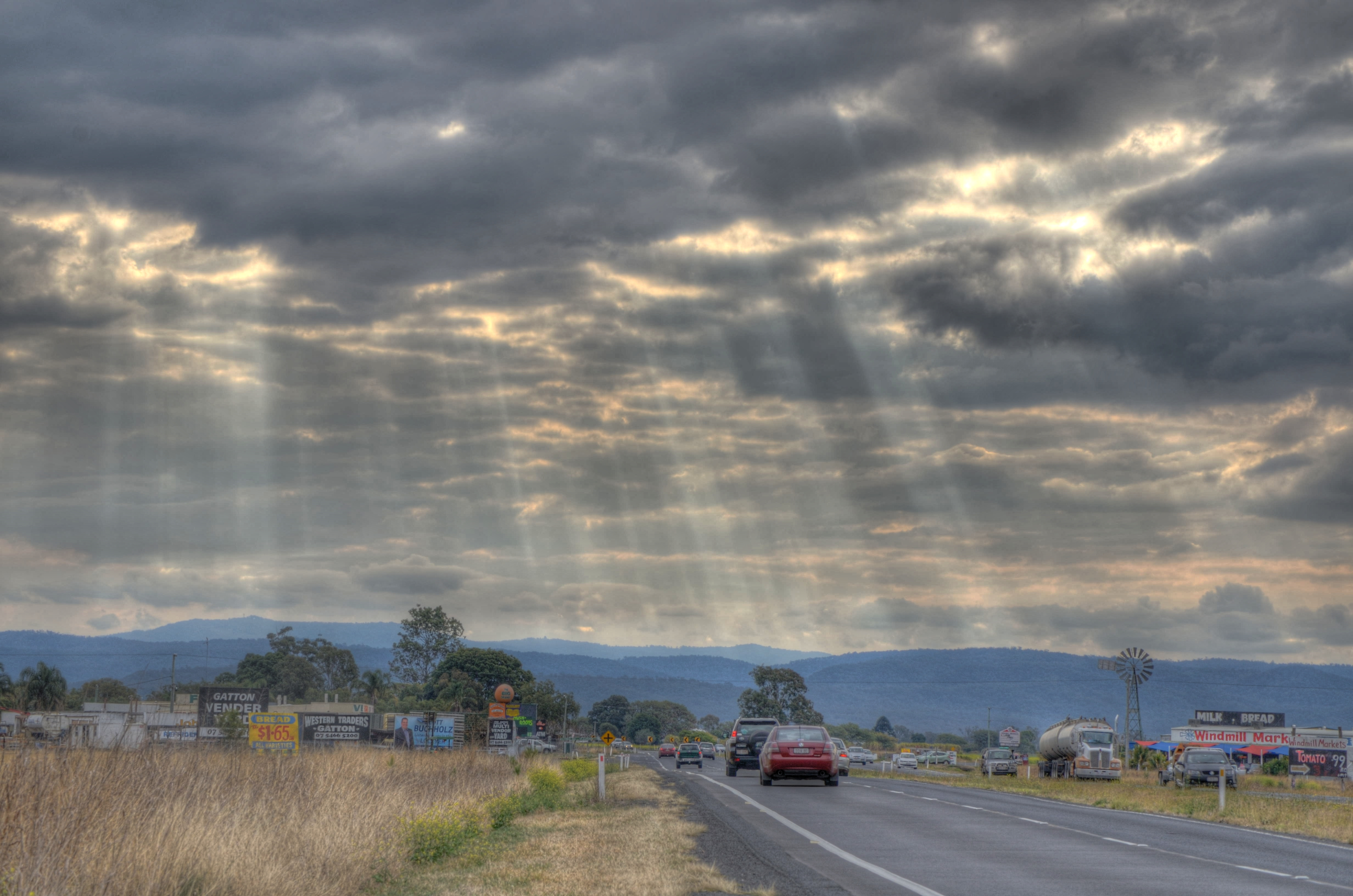
Stretch of Highway between Ipswich and Toowoomba

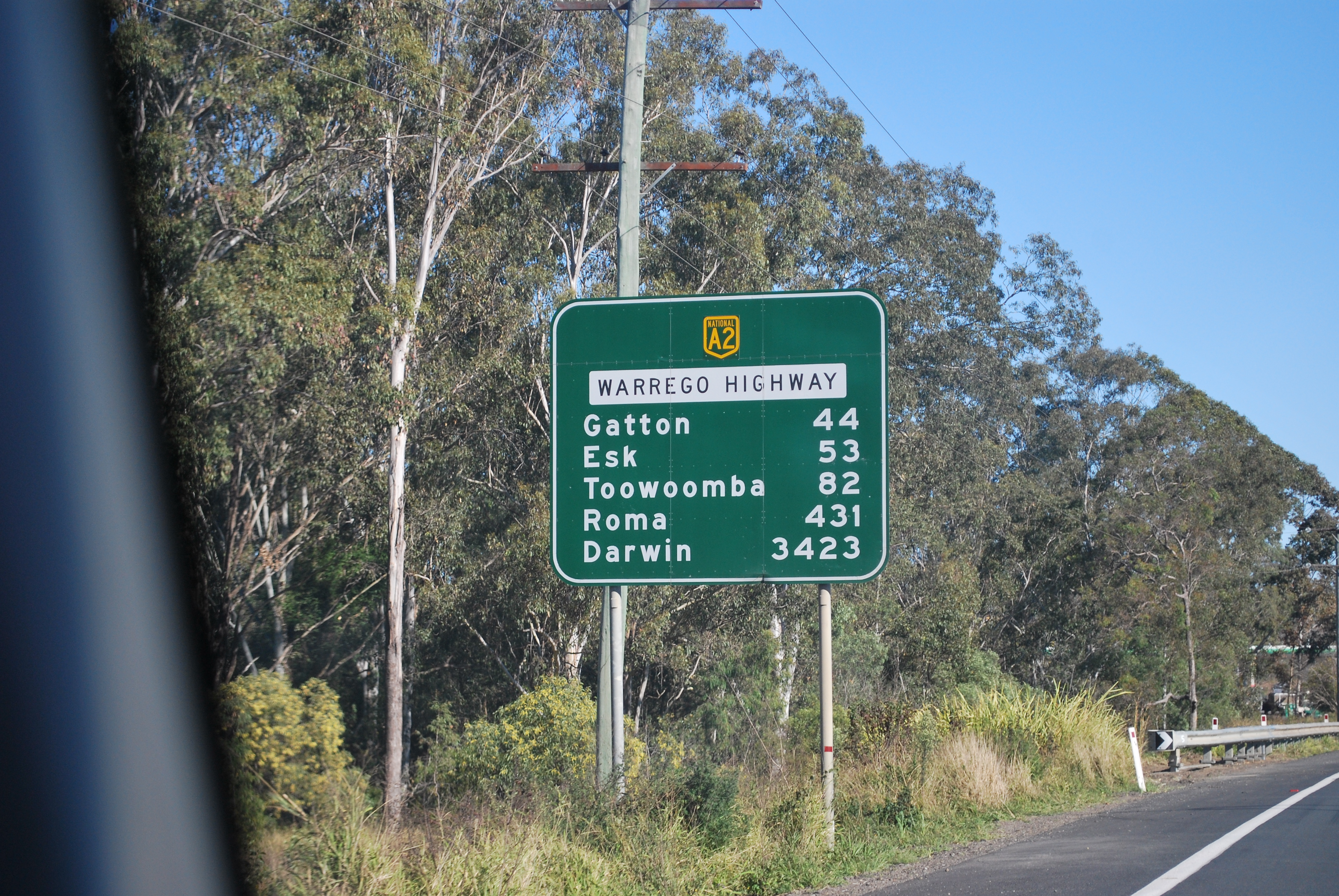
A signpost

== History ==
In January 2011, the former highway was extensively damaged where it crossed the Toowoomba Range. This included land slips, shoulder and embankment erosion, the erosion of drains and damaged rock fall netting. The road wasn't fully repaired with all four lanes open until September 2011.

The Toowoomba Bypass was completed in September 2019 and bypasses the urban area of Toowoomba and provides a better crossing of the Great Dividing Range. Warrego Highway (A2) was rerouted via the bypass between Helidon Spa (in the east) and the interchange at Charlton (in the west). The bypass continues as the Gore Highway (A39) and is 41 km in length. The original section of Warrego Highway through Toowoomba was renamed Toowoomba Connection Road (A21).

The highway was closed for several days at North Tivoli in May 2025 after an overpass was struck during the transport of a wind turbine.

== Major works ==
- 1957 – Helidon bypass. New road built to bypass Helidon including a steel and concrete bridge over Lockyer Creek. Construction started in 1954, and the bypass was opened by the end of June 1957.
- 1959 – Ipswich bypass. New 8 mile long bypass including a steel and concrete bridge over the Bremer River built to bypass Ipswich City, shortening the highway by 2 miles. Also completed this year was the first bridge over Laidley Creek at Crowley Vale.
- 1965 – Toowoomba Range duplication.
- 1966 – Lockyer Creek deviation. Single carriageway 3.6 mile (5.8 km) long deviation to bypass a series of sharp curves between Gatton and Grantham, including a new bridge over Lockyer Creek. The old alignment followed Wells Road and Armstrongs Road.
- 1968 – Marburg Range deviation. Three-lane road built to bypass a sub-standard section of road over the Marburg Range.
- 1970 – Duplication from Withcott to the eastern end of the Toowoomba Range.
- 1971 – Marburg bypass. Single carriageway 1.9 mile (3.1 km) long bypass of Marburg, including bridges over Queen Street and Black Snake Creek.
- 1971 – Helidon to Withcott deviation. Single carriageway 5.15 mile (8.3 km) long deviation replacing the old road which was on a sub-standard alignment. The deviation opened to traffic in December of that year.
- 1973 – Tenthill Creek bridge. New prestressed concrete girder bridge over Tenthill Creek to replace the old truss structure known as Robinson's Bridge.
- 1974 – Minden Range deviation. 2.6 km long four-lane road built to bypass a sub-standard section of road over the Minden Range.
- 1976 – Hatton Vale to Laidley Creek duplication.
- 1978 – Haigslea–Malabar Road to Marburg and Marburg Range to Minden Range duplication.
- 1980 – Pine Mountain Road to Brisbane Valley Highway and Minden Range to Hatton Vale duplication.
- 1982 – Brisbane Valley Highway to Haigslea–Amberley Road duplication.
- 1983 – Haigslea–Amberley Road to Haigslea–Malabar Road duplication.
- 1985 – Eastern half of Marburg Range deviation upgraded from three to four lanes. The western half had been upgraded in 1978.
- 1986 – Laidley Creek to Gatton duplication Stage 1. 5.6 km of road between Laidley Creek and the Queensland Agricultural College was duplicated, including a second bridge over Laidley Creek at Crowley Vale.
- 1986 – Mt Crosby Road interchange.
- 1987 – Laidley Creek to Gatton duplication Stage 2. 3.9 km of road between the Queensland Agricultural College and Gatton–Esk Road was duplicated.
- 1988 – Waterworks Road to Pine Mountain Road duplication, including an interchange at Pine Mountain Road.
- 1989 – Mt Crosby Road to Waterworks Road duplication.
- 1989 – Gatton bypass. Single carriageway 20 km long bypass of Gatton constructed at a cost of $20 million opened in November 1989.
- 1991 – Helidon to Withcott deviation duplication.
- 1993 – Bremer River Bridge Duplication. Second bridge over the Bremer River and second carriageway from the Bremer River Bridge to Mt Crosby Road opened by Federal Minister for Transport Bob Brown on 29 January 1993.
- 1994 – Dinmore Duplication. 2.7 km of road duplicated to four lanes from the railway at Dinmore to the Bremer River Bridge, including an interchange at River Road.
- 1994 – Construction of overtaking lanes on the Gatton Bypass.
- 1996 – 2.8 km section between Greenwattle Street and Nugent Pinch Road in Toowoomba duplicated to relieve traffic congestion at a cost of $2.5 million.
- 1997 – Oakey Bypass.
- 2001 – Marburg bypass duplication completed, Queen Street ramps added.
- 2002 – Yaralla Deviation. 18.5 km realignment built to bypass a notorious section prone to flooding west of Dalby.
- 2003 – Gatton Bypass duplication completed, removing the final single carriageway section of the Warrego Highway between Ipswich and Toowoomba.
- 2017 – Toowoomba to Oakey Duplication Stage 1. Highway duplicated from Nugent Pinch Road to Charlton.
- 2018 – Toowoomba to Oakey Duplication Stage 2. Highway duplicated from Charlton to Kingsthorpe including an interchange at Kingsthorpe–Haden Road
- 2019 – Toowoomba Second Range Crossing – Helidon Spa to Charlton (Northern concurrency terminus with Gore Highway)

== Recent developments ==
=== Dalby Eastern & Western Access ===
These projects began in 2017 to fully duplicate the highway to four lanes, between Cecil Plains Road and Black Street. Four new traffic signals were added at Black Street, Jandowae Road, Orpen Street and a pedestrian signal near Owen Street. Both projects were completed in November 2018, at a combined cost of $115 million.

== Roads of Strategic Importance ==
The Roads of Strategic Importance initiative, last updated in March 2022, includes the following project for the Warrego Highway.

=== Priority section projects ===
A project to upgrade priority sections of the Toowoomba to Ipswich corridor, including the Warrego Highway and surrounding state and council roads, at an estimated cost of $75 million, was in planning in May 2020.

== Other projects ==
=== Brimblecombe Road intersection ===
A project to upgrade the Brimblecombe Road intersection between Toowoomba and Dalby, at a cost of $2.75 million, was completed in December 2021.

=== Gatton heavy vehicle decoupling facility ===
A project to provide a heavy vehicle decoupling facility at Gatton was completed by November 2021.

=== Master plan Ipswich to Toowoomba ===
A master plan for the upgrade of the highway between Ipswich and Toowoomba has been developed at a cost of $6.78 million.

=== Haigslea–Amberley Road intersection ===
A project to plan the upgrade of the Haigslea-Amberley Road intersection, at a cost of $799,000, was in progress in May 2022.

=== Mount Crosby Road intersection ===
A project to plan the upgrade of the Mount Crosby Road intersection, at a cost of $5 million, was in progress in July 2021.

== Other items of interest ==
=== Darren Lockyer Way ===
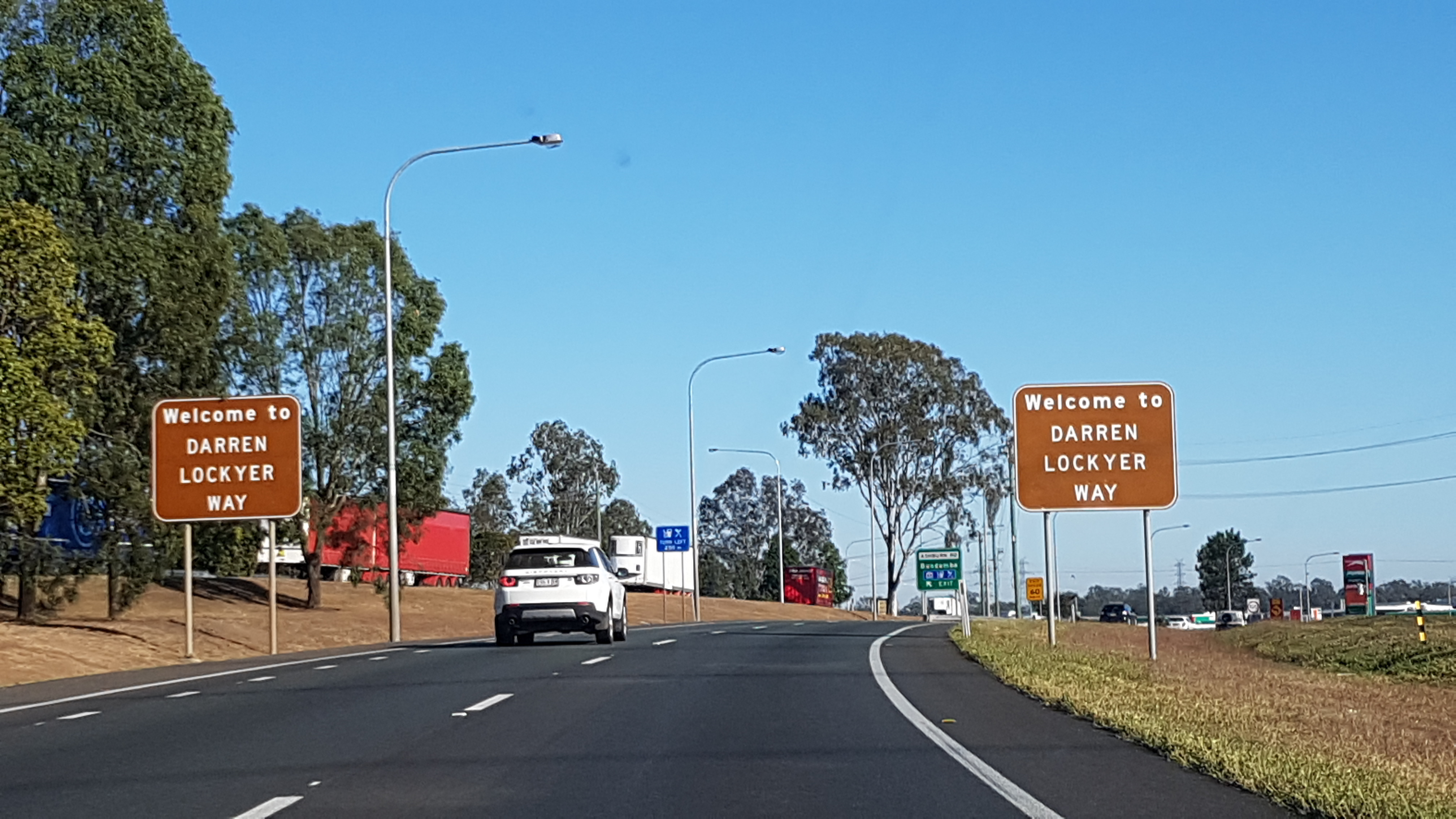
"Welcome to Darren Lockyer Way" signage at Ipswich end of Warrego Highway heading westbound.

On 28 September 2011 the Queensland Main Roads Minister, Craig Wallace, announced that an 85 km stretch of the Warrego Highway was to be renamed Darren Lockyer Way, in honour of the retired Brisbane Broncos, Queensland and Australian rugby league captain. The section of road renamed is from Riverview to the bottom of the Toowoomba Range at Withcott. Special signage including "Welcome to Darren Lockyer Way" has been erected.

== Major intersections ==
| LGA | Location | km | mi | Destinations | Notes |
|---|---|---|---|---|---|
| Ipswich | Riverview | 0 | 0.0 | Ipswich Motorway (National Route M2) – east – Brisbane, Gold Coast, Sunshine Coast; Cunningham Highway (National Highway M15) – west — Dinmore | South–eastern end of Warrego Highway (State Route M2 / National Highway A2) |
| Ipswich | Karalee / Chuwar / North Tivoli boundary | 6.3 | 3.9 | Mount Crosby Road (State Route 37) – north – Mount Crosby south – Tivoli | Modified diamond interchange. Part of Chuwar is in the Brisbane LGA. |
| Ipswich | Brassal / Muirlea boundary | 12.9 | 8.0 | Fernvale Road (State Route 38) – south – Brassall; Pine Mountain Road – north – Pine Mountain | Modified diamond interchange. The road changes to National Highway A2 from this point. |
| Ipswich | Blacksoil / Ironbark / Karrabin boundary | 14.9– 15.8 | 9.3– 9.8 | Brisbane Valley Highway (National Route A17) – north – Fernvale; Wulkuraka Connection Road – south – Wulkuraka | Modified diamond interchange. |
| Lockyer | Plainland | 44.2 | 27.5 | Laidley Plainland Road – south–west – Laidley; Gehrke Road – north – Plainland | Modified diamond interchange, Eastbound ramp exits towards service centre. |
| Lockyer | Gatton | 55.9 | 34.7 | Eastern Drive (State Route 80) – south–west – Gatton; Gatton–Esk Road – north – Esk | Modified diamond interchange. |
| Lockyer | Helidon | 74.7 | 46.4 | Gatton Helidon Road – south–east – Grantham – north – Helidon | Modified diamond interchange. |
| Toowoomba | Helidon Spa | 79.5 | 49.4 | Toowoomba Connection Road (A21) – west – Toowoomba | No entry from Toowoomba Connection Road eastbound and no exit to Toowoomba Connection Road westbound (except via a U-turn facility further east on the Warrego Highway); Warrego Highway runs north–west on the Toowoomba Bypass |
| Toowoomba | Ballard | 94.6 | 58.8 | | Eastern end of Multuggerah Viaduct |
| Toowoomba | Mount Kynoch | 95.4 | 59.3 | | Western end of the viaduct, crossing the Main Line railway |
| Toowoomba | Mount Kynoch | 95.8 | 59.5 | New England Highway (A3) | Bridges over the bypass. No entry or exit here. See Mort Street interchange below. |
| Toowoomba | Harlaxton / Cranley midpoint | 96.7– 96.9 | 60.1– 60.2 | | Bridge over Gowrie Creek, Western railway line and Hermitage Road. |
| Toowoomba | Cranley | 97.2– 97.9 | 60.4– 60.8 | Mort Street interchange Hermitage Road – south–east – Toowoomba (via Mort Street) north–west – Cranley | Entry from and exit to New England Highway |
| Toowoomba | Cranley | 100.1– 100.6 | 62.2– 62.5 | Boundary Street | Bridge over the bypass. Eastbound entry and westbound exit. |
| Toowoomba | Charlton | 105.7 | 65.7 | Toowoomba Connection Road (A21) – east – Toowoomba | T intersection; Warrego Highway turns west. Toowoomba Bypass continues south–west as Gore Highway (A39) |
| Toowoomba | Oakey | 123.9 | 77.0 | Oakey–Pittsworth Road (State Route 68) – north–east – Oakey | |
| Western Downs | Dalby | 175.9 | 109.3 | Dalby–Cecil Plains Road (State Route 82) – south – Cecil Plains | Eastern concurrency terminus with State Route 82. |
| Western Downs | Dalby | 179.3 | 111.4 | Bunya Highway (State Route 49) – north–east – Bell; Condamine Street – south–west – Dalby | Eastern concurrency terminus with State Route 49. |
| Western Downs | Dalby | 179.8 | 111.7 | Moonie Highway (State Route 49) – south–west – Moonie; Nicholson Street – north–east – Dalby | Western concurrency terminus with State Route 49. |
| Western Downs | Dalby | 180.5 | 112.2 | Dalby–Jandowae Road (State Route 82) – north – Jandowae | Western concurrency terminus with State Route 82. |
| Western Downs | Miles | 305.5 | 189.8 | Leichhardt Highway (State Route A5) – south – Condamine | Eastern concurrency terminus with Leichhardt Highway. |
| Western Downs | Miles | 306.7 | 190.6 | Leichhardt Highway (State Route A5) – north – Wandoan | Western concurrency terminus with Leichhardt Highway. |
| Maranoa | Roma | 440.7 | 273.8 | Carnarvon Highway (State Route A55) – south – Surat | Eastern concurrency terminus with Carnarvon Highway. |
| Maranoa | Roma | 446.7 | 277.6 | Carnarvon Highway (State Route A55) – north – Injune | Western concurrency terminus with Carnarvon Highway. |
| Murweh | Morven | 627.7 | 390.0 | Landsborough Highway (National Highway A2) – north–west – Augathella | Warrego Highway continues west as Alternate National Highway A2. National Highway A2 continues north–west as Landsborough Highway. |
| Murweh | Charleville | 714.5 | 444.0 | Mitchell Highway (State Route A71) – north – Augathella south – Cunnamulla | North-western end of Warrego Highway. |
1.000 mi = 1.609 km; 1.000 km = 0.621 mi: Concurrency terminus; Incomplete access; Route transition

== See also ==
- Highways in Australia
- List of highways in Queensland
