= SEIFA =

Socio-Economic Indexes for Areas (commonly known by its acronym, SEIFA) is a product that summarizes the relative socio-economic characteristics of Australian communities. The indexes have been created by the Australian Bureau of Statistics, the national statistical agency. The source of the data is derived from the five-yearly Census of Population and Housing, and is calculated using principal component analysis (PCA).

== Domains and variables ==
First produced following the 1971 Census, SEIFA is primarily used to rank areas according to socio-economic advantage and disadvantage based on census data. The census variables include household income, education, employment, occupation, housing and other indicators of advantage and disadvantage. Combined, the indexes provide more general measures of socio-economic status than is given by measuring any one of the variables in isolation. SEIFA consists of four indexes, each being a summary of a different set of census variables:

SEIFA indexes
1.	Index of Relative Socio-economic Advantage / Disadvantage (IRSAD)	A composite index where lower scores indicate more disadvantaged areas and higher scores indicate more advantaged areas. This index is constructed using a number of different variables that indicate both advantage (e.g., high income, having a degree qualification) and disadvantage (e.g., unemployment status, low income, number of bedrooms)
2.	Index of Relative Socio-economic Disadvantage (IRSD)	Identifies areas with lower educational attainment, people in low-skilled occupations, low employment and other indicators of disadvantage. This index ranks areas from most disadvantaged to least disadvantaged
3.	Index of Economic Resources (IER)	Includes variables such as rent paid, household income and mortgage payments
4.	Index of Education and Occupation (IEO)	Includes education and occupation variables

== Calculation method ==
Principal component analysis (PCA) is used to create SEIFA. This method creates a summary measure of a group of variables, in this case related to socio-economic advantage and disadvantage.

In a paper presented by the Queensland Department of Aboriginal and Torres Strait Islander Policy at the Australian Population Association 2004 conference, it was claimed that SEIFA was not an accurate measure of social and economic disadvantage for Indigenous Australians, especially where SEIFA is used at a small area level, and the populations or households in each area are relatively homogeneous.

== Publication ==
SEIFA is published every five years and is available for free on the Australian Bureau of Statistics website. SEIFA is used by federal, state and local government agencies as well as community and business groups. The most recent issue of SEIFA is based on the 2021 Australian Census and was released on 27 April 2023.

== See also ==
- Australian Bureau of Statistics
- Census in Australia
- Tony Vinson
