= Withcott =

- Town
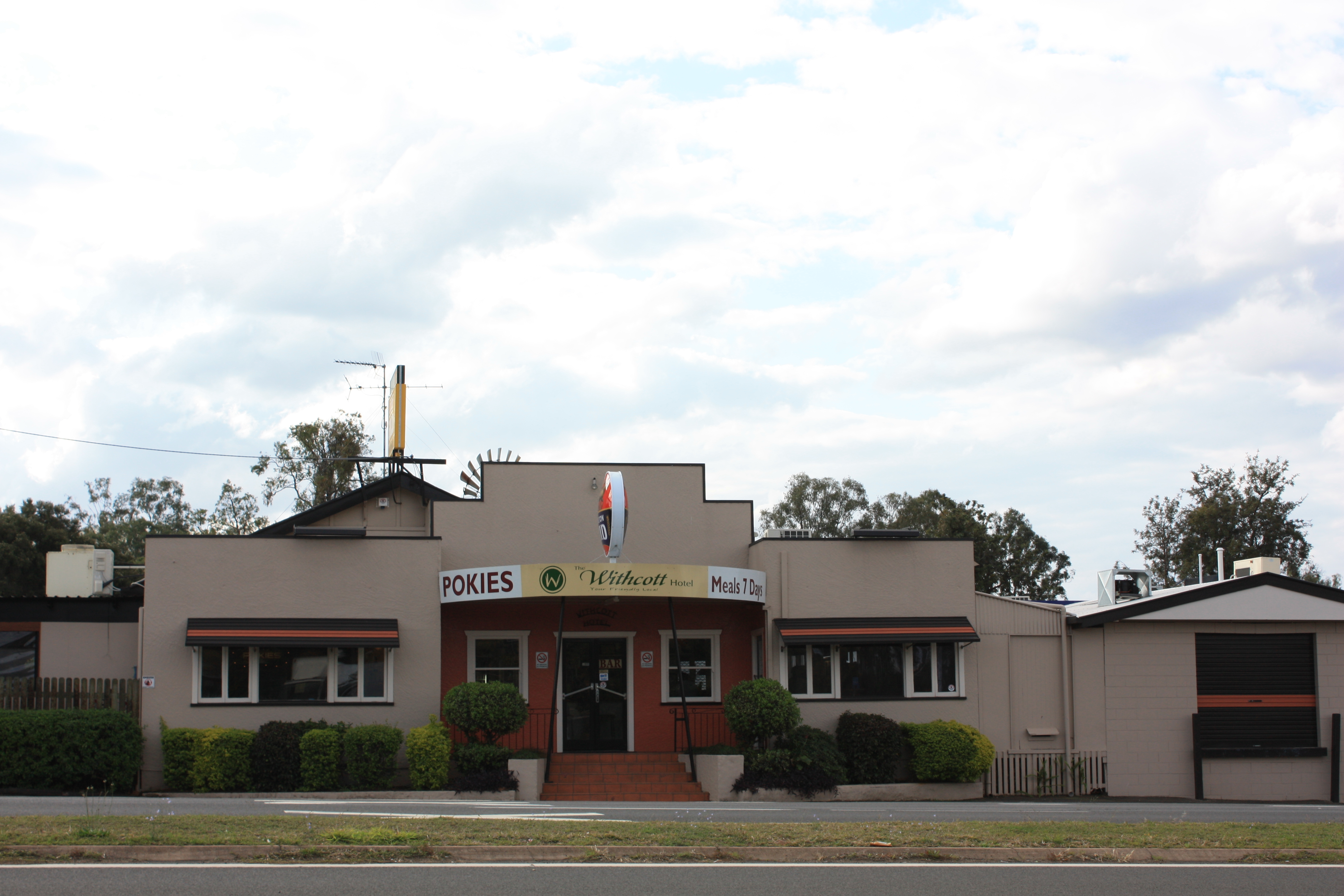
- Withcott Hotel

- Interactive map of Withcott
- Coordinates: 27.5536°S 152.0238°E
- Country: Australia
- State: Queensland
- LGA: Lockyer Valley Region
- Location: 8.7 km (5.4 mi) E of Toowoomba CBD; 28.2 km (17.5 mi) W of Gatton; 118 km (73 mi) W of Brisbane

Government
  - State electorate: Lockyer
  - Federal division: Wright

Area
  - Total: 30.7 km^{2} (11.9 sq mi)

Population
  - Total: 2,067 (2021 census)
  - Density: 67.33/km^{2} (174.4/sq mi)
- Time zone: UTC+10:00 (AEST)
- Postcode: 4352
Localities around Withcott
Ballard	Murphys Creek	Lockyer
Mount Lofty; Prince Henry Heights	Withcott	Postmans Ridge
Redwood	Rangeville	Blanchview

Withcott is a rural town and locality in the Lockyer Valley Region, Queensland, Australia. In the 2021 census, the locality of Withcott had a population of 2,067 people.

== Geography ==
Withcott is located in the Lockyer Valley at the foot of the Toowoomba range on the Toowoomba Connection Road, formerly part of the Warrego Highway, 116 kilometres (72 mi) west of the state capital, Brisbane and 10 kilometres (6.2 mi) east of the regional centre of Toowoomba.

== History ==
Withcott Methodist Church was built in 1900 from timber at a cost of £90. It could seat 100 people. It has closed and been demolished.

Withcott State School opened in September 1912 on the Toowoomba Commonage with headmaster Mr M. F. Ryan. When its enrolment fell to 8 students, it was closed on 30 April 1971 and the land sold. The school was at 159 Roches Road (corner of Little Oakey Creek Road, 27.5416°S 152.0195°E). Due to increased population, Withcott State School was reopened on 31 January 1984 in a new location in Biggs Road with principal Lance Wilson.

Holy Family Catholic Church was built in 1990 from brick.

Withcott Church of Christ was built in 1990 from brick.

In 1969, the Upper Lockyer Withcott branch of the Queensland Country Women's Association built a hall at 4 Biggs Road, adjoining the Warrego Highway. (27.55443°S 152.02333°E). It was demolished in late 2018 and has since been turned into a public day use facility, containing a bathroom and undercover dining & seating area.

During the 2010–2011 Queensland floods, Withcott suffered extensive damage when a flash flood hit the town on 10 January 2011.

== Demographics ==
In the 2006 census, the town of Withcott had a population of 1,000 people.

In the 2016 census, the locality of Withcott had a population of 1,844 people.

In the 2021 census, the locality of Withcott had a population of 2,067 people.

== Education ==
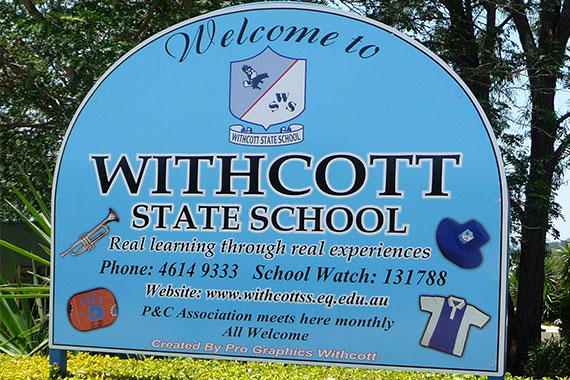
Withcott State School

Withcott State School is a government primary (Prep–6) school for boys and girls at 26 Biggs Road (27.5594°S 152.0237°E). In 2017, the school had an enrolment of 198 students with 17 teachers (13 full-time equivalent) and 17 non-teaching staff (9 full-time equivalent). In 2022, the school had 239 students with 21 teachers (18 full-time equivalent) and 16 non-teaching staff (10 full-time equivalent).

There are no secondary schools in Withcott. The nearest government secondary schools are Centenary Heights State High School in Centenary Heights to the south-west and Toowoomba State High School in Mount Lofty to the west, both in Toowoomba.

== Amenities ==
Holy Family Catholic Church is at 16 Rutherford Road (27.553179°S 152.0298°E).

Withcott Church of Christ is at 42 Biggs Road (27.560499°S 152.0255°E).
