= Geeumbi =

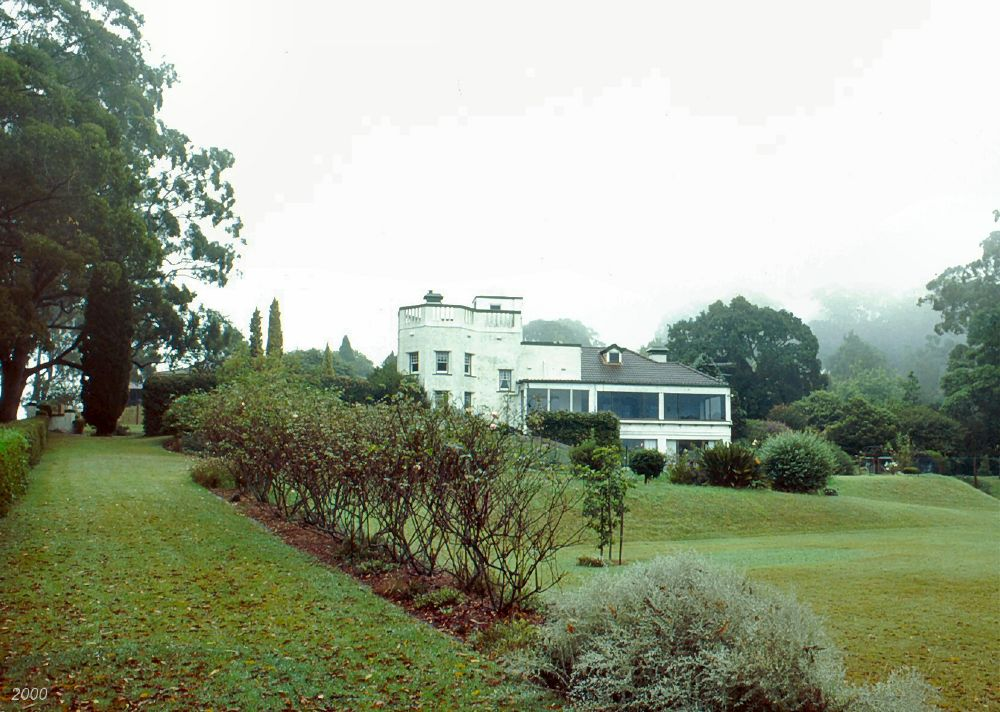
- Geeumbi, house and gardens, 2000

- Location within Queensland Location within Australia
- 27.5828°S 151.9897°E
- Location: 1 South Street, Rangeville, Toowoomba, Toowoomba Region, Queensland, Australia

History
- Design period: 1914–1919 (World War I)
- Built: 1914–1918
- Built for: Thomas Arthur Price

Site notes
- Architect: Thomas Arthur Price

Queensland Heritage Register
- Official name: Geeumbi
- Type: state heritage (landscape, built)
- Designated: 21 October 1992
- Reference no.: 600867
- Significant period: 1910s (fabric); 1910s–1950s (historical)
- Significant components: garden/grounds, views from, drain/channel/ditch – irrigation, residential accommodation – main house, tank – water, fence/wall – perimeter, wall/s – retaining, pathway/walkway, lawn/s, trees/plantings, terracing, tennis court, garden — native, tower – observation/lookout, driveway, garden – vegetable
- Builders: Ernest Pottinger

Geeumbi is a heritage-listed villa at 1 South Street, Rangeville, Toowoomba, Toowoomba Region, Queensland, Australia. It was designed by Thomas Arthur Price for his own residence and built from 1914 to 1918 by Ernest Pottinger. It was added to the Queensland Heritage Register on 21 October 1992.

== History ==
Geeumbi (the Aboriginal name for Table Top Mountain, which the house overlooks) was built between the years 1914–1918 by Ernest Pottinger for Dr Thomas Arthur Price and his wife. The house is a substantial concrete structure of unusual design set in extensive mature gardens on the southern Toowoomba Range commanding wide-ranging easterly views. It is situated amongst other substantial properties including Rodway across South Street constructed in 1904. The owner, Dr Price, designed Geeumbi himself having been an architecture student for two years in Brisbane before leaving Australia to study medicine at the University of Edinburgh.

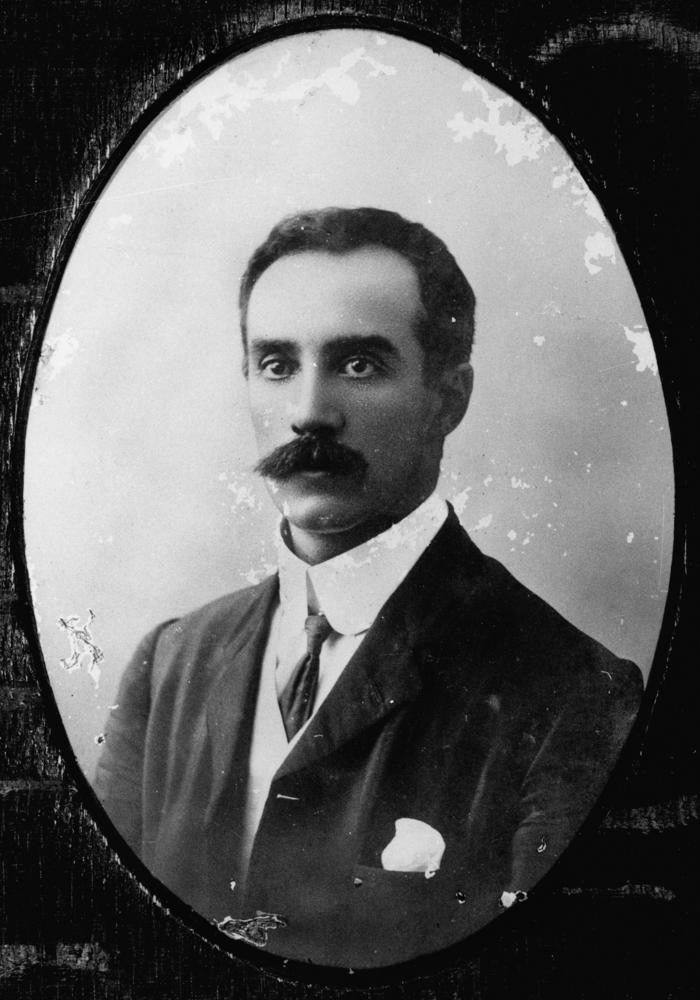
Dr Thomas Arthur Price, as a young man

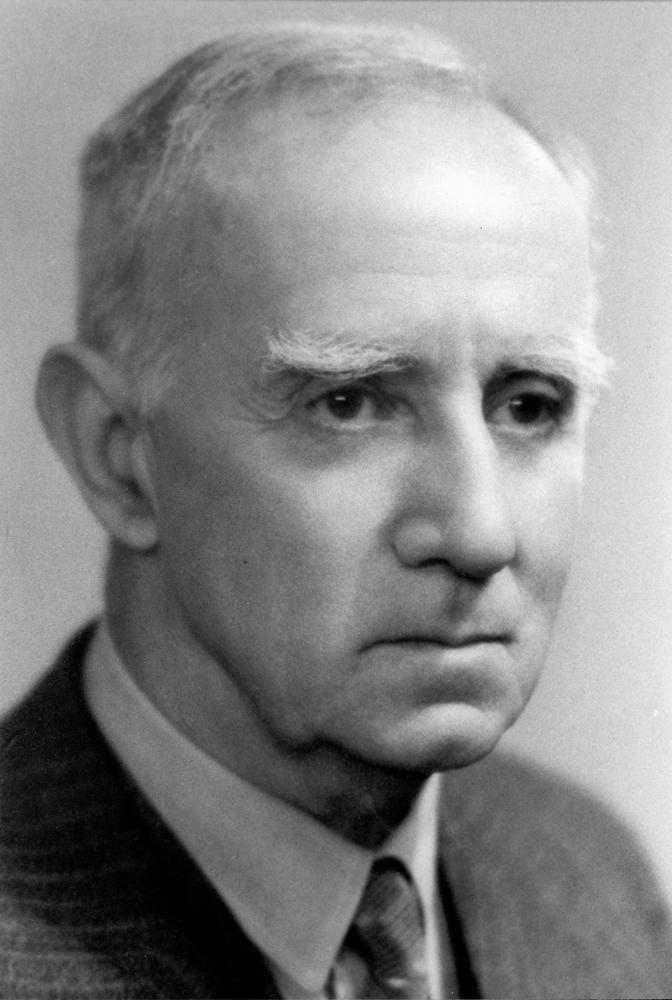
Dr Price, as an older man

Dr Thomas Price arrived in Toowoomba in 1903 to take up a position at the Willowburn Mental Hospital. He later went into private medical practice but following World War I started a practice as an Ear, Nose and Throat Specialist at both the Toowoomba General Hospital and St Vincent's Hospital. From the time of his arrival in Toowoomba Dr. Price had been concerned for the health of the community as mosquitoes were a major problem due to the swamps and open drains that ran throughout the town. Despite campaigning for the appointment of a Government Inspector to control the mosquito problem he was not successful until he stood and was elected to the Toowoomba City Council in 1912. After he was elected Mayor in 1918, Dr. Price stepped-up his campaign and was eventually successful in draining the swamps and eradicating the mosquito problem in Toowoomba. He was similarly interested in the welfare of the youth of the city. He was a Scout Leader and with the assistance of his wife started the Boy Scouts and Girl Guide movements in the city using his own property for camps and orientation exercises. In the 1930s at the height of the Great Depression, Dr. Price organized a self-help camp at Redwood Park for the itinerant unemployed. Much of the fresh vegetables to feed the men in this camp came from the kitchen garden around Geeumbi. Shortly before his death in 1957 Dr Price sold Geeumbi and retired to live in Sydney. His wife Hester had died at Toowoomba in 1944. The Dr Price Memorial Mothercraft Centre perpetuates his memory in Toowoomba.

The land on which Geeumbi sits has been transferred and subdivided a number of times since the original deed of grant was proclaimed on 25/9/1889. William Tirril was the first owner of the land which comprised 200 acres (81 ha) of steep, heavily timbered land on the escarpment of the range. Tirril cleared much of the land and established a dairy farm on the site. The farm had originally extended from the present Rowbottom Street in the west to the boundary of Hartmann's land to the north and had South Street as its southern boundary. (Hartmann's land eventually became the Picnic Point parklands.) At this stage much of the land on the Southern Range was sparsely populated and devoted to farming and timber getting.

The land passed through several hands until Dr Price purchased a sub-division of the original farm in 1912 on which the old timber farmhouse and several out-buildings were situated. Before and during the construction of their new home, the Price family lived in the original farmhouse just a short distance away from the building site. Evidence of this first house can be found in the concrete pathway leading from an opening in the hedge on the South Street frontage and in a low wall, once a portion of the foundations. This wall has been incorporated in the garden terracing to the southwest of the front entrance of Geeumbi.

At the beginning of the twentieth century many of the houses built on the escarpment of the Range in Toowoomba were substantial and affluent places intended as summer residences, e.g. Harlaxton House and Rodway. A trend had developed by the end of the 19th century for wealthy squatters and prominent Brisbane businessmen and politicians to take advantage of the natural views and environment of the Toowoomba Range as well as the "invigorating" climate. The construction of Geeumbi from 1914 to 1918 followed this pattern of affluent settlement in the area which established the Range as a prime residential precinct in Toowoomba.

Construction of the house was commenced in 1914. The foundations and walls of the new house were constructed by pouring concrete into box framing made from timber and flattened tin, an innovative approach for the time. Dr Price was a keen astronomer and the tower end of the building was designed for viewing the night skies from a clear vantage point above the tree line. The house was positioned to take advantage of the distinct view of Table Top Mountain and the night skies as opposed to the immediate views. The unusual appearance and construction of Geeumbi was clearly a result of the creativity of Dr Price, who designed the house with his particular needs and desires in mind, making the building a departure from the standard residential development occurring at the time. Minor alterations have been carried out on the most noticeable of these being the enclosure of the southern verandah for protection against the wind.

Dr Price, a keen gardener and bush walker collected native plants from around the local ridges and planted them in the garden that he developed after the completion of the house. Terraces were formed close to the building to act as extensions to the living areas of the house. Lower terraces were formed further down the hill and planted with various forms of hedge plants. A hedge was planted on the South Street frontage and the along the eastern edge of the land adjoining the escarpment reserve. To the western side of the house an extensive kitchen garden was established again on terraces stabilised by the construction of concrete walls. Fruit trees were also cultivated in this area. Whilst the garden about Geeumbi was large, it was mostly free from as opposed to the controlled shapes and designs that were popular in the earlier stages of the development of Toowoomba gardens. The largest proportion of the grounds remained as open grassland or patches of scrub were left. The Price children owned several horses and had walking tracks through the area.

Following the retirement of Dr Price the house and accompanying five acres of land first passed to the Price children and then in 1954 was sold to Francis Bushby who in turn sold to Cyril Conroy. The property remained in the hands of the Conroy family until 1972 when it was sold to Dr. John and Mrs Judith Noble. At this stage the house and gardens were in a rundown state. Although the form of the Price garden remained, many of the original plants had been allowed to die and ivy had covered a large portion of the tower of the house.

In 1972 the land was subdivided into two sections with the western section being sold off as five residential lots. This section included a portion of the kitchen garden. In 1973 Drs Mary and Godfrey Gapp, purchased Geeumbi and further subdivided the land into two blocks and more recently another block was sold from the southwestern corner of the garden. The remaining 1.69 hectares (4.2 acres) of land was resurveyed as Lot 1 on RP 142232.

The gardens around Geeumbi have basically retained their early form with the remaining portion of the vegetable garden still used in the same way. The terraces and other features such as the tennis court and old concrete water tank have remained. A structure understood to be a swimming pool was removed a number of years ago. The front garden has been maintained despite the loss of a large tree that was a feature of the round bed in the centre of the driveway.

In 2009, the house was purchased by the Maridahdi Early Childhood Community School which proposed to spend $3 million on the property; however, there were objections from the neighbours. This led to a legal battle to gain the necessary approvals, which terminated in June 2012 when the Planning and Environment Court upheld the Toowoomba Regional Council's decision to not approve the development despite an earlier recommendation from the council's planning department that the application should be approved.

== Description ==
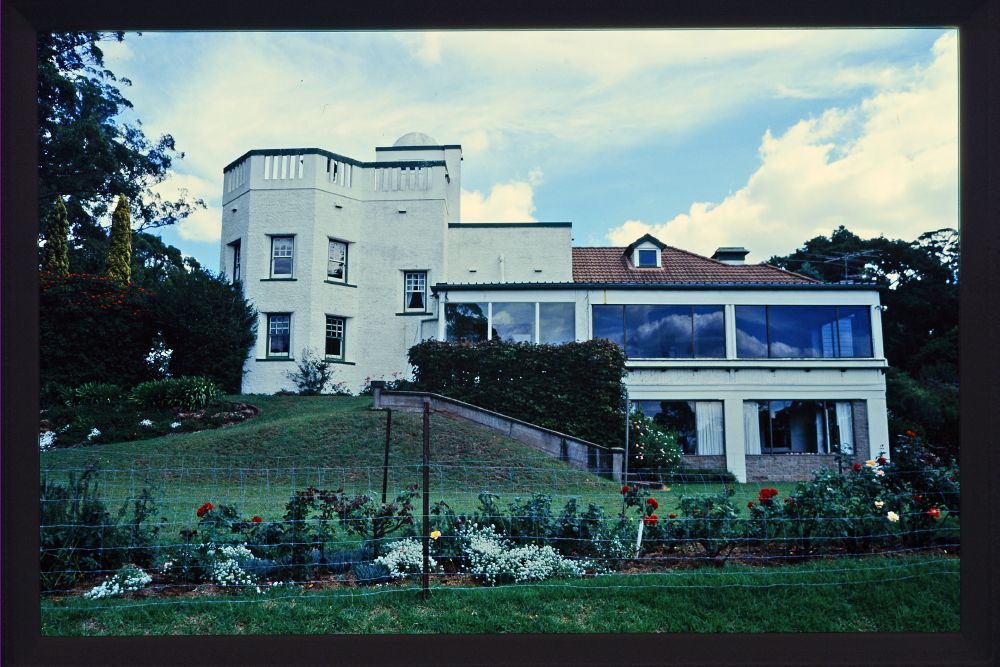
Geeumbi, close-up

Geeumbi is a substantial and complex four-level residence of concrete construction set in expansive cultivated grounds on the northern side of South Street, Toowoomba. The property is situated close to the escarpment of the Southern Toowoomba Range and the house is oriented to take advantage of the easterly views. The allotment covers an area of 1.69 hectares (4.2 acres) and the relationship between the house, gardens, garden structures and the expansive views are critical to the significance of the place.

The South Street entrance to Geeumbi is marked by two low concrete walls flanking a central driveway, with mature hedges extending along the front boundary creating a distinctive fence line. The circular driveway is constructed of decorative concrete slabs, and is distinguished by a round garden bed in front of the entrance to the house. The circular drive area is surrounded by tall mature hedges, making the entrance to the house a secluded space.

The house is constructed of solid concrete about 30 centimetres (12 in) thick. It is built on four levels which include the ground floor, the common room, bedrooms and living areas on the second floor, the "den" on the third floor and a flat roof with solid concrete railings containing an observatory as the fourth level. It is asymmetrical in plan and elevation, and has two distinct sections which differ in style. The front portion of the house is distinguished by the imposing octagonal tower and walled open roof and presents the appearance of a Mediterranean Villa with a rendered concrete finish, while the rear of the house is reminiscent of the Arts & Craft style popular at this time with a steeply pitched complex tiled roof and dormer window among other features. The rear section of the house also incorporates some weatherboard cladding. There is a clear line where the two different design styles meet which is visible from the eastern elevation.

The eastern side of the house is distinguished by the garden terraces that lead down to a flat, open grassy plain which in turn leads into bushland. The orientation of the house towards the easterly outlook is demonstrated by the large, now enclosed, verandah running along the eastern elevation as well as the octagonal tower which also comprises a large portion of the eastern elevation. The domed roof structure visible on the tower, once housed telescopic equipment.

Close to the rear of the house is a concrete tennis court with red pigment, part of the original lay out of the grounds. The rear garden also comprises a wide terrace extending north into bushland and is bordered by formal plantings.

The western side of the house still retains the original vegetable gardens, fruit trees, grape vines and utilitarian structures such as the large concrete water tank and concrete retaining walls and drains. A pathway leads from this part of the garden to a side entrance door on the western elevation of the house which gains direct access to the kitchen, reflecting the practical purpose of the "kitchen garden" in the daily working of the house.

Internally, the house is highly intact, retaining many of its original design features. The front portion of the house contains the formal entry and formal lounge and dining to the eastern side and the kitchen to the western side. Entry to the tower is gained from the formal lounge at the southeast corner of the house and comprises a narrow spiral staircase leading to what was Dr Price's den. This den is constructed in a mezzanine style and overlooks the internal lounge below.

== Heritage listing ==
Geeumbi was listed on the Queensland Heritage Register on 21 October 1992 having satisfied the following criteria.

The place is important in demonstrating the evolution or pattern of Queensland's history.

Geeumbi is important in demonstrating the evolution and pattern of Queensland's history, in particular the development of Toowoomba as the service centre for the Darling Downs Region and the development of the Range area as a prime residential precinct in Toowoomba.

The place demonstrates rare, uncommon or endangered aspects of Queensland's cultural heritage.

Constructed from 1914 to 1918, Geeumbi is an unusual example of a substantial residence from the period in Queensland. Its poured-concrete construction and distinctive design principles distinguish Geeumbi from contemporaneous development in Queensland and bears testament to the creativity of its owner and architect, Dr T.A. Price, as a residence of great individuality and innovation.

The place is important because of its aesthetic significance.

Geeumbi is aesthetically significant as an unusual and interesting building set in extensive grounds with expansive views to Table Top Mountain from its position on the Toowoomba Range. Its design and setting make a strong visual impact to South Street and the surrounding area and its external and internal detailing and fittings are all significant in contributing to the aesthetic importance of the place. The grounds contain many mature trees and other plantings, such as grapevines and hedges and flowers, which are also highly aesthetically significant.

The place is important in demonstrating a high degree of creative or technical achievement at a particular period.

Constructed from 1914 to 1918, Geeumbi is an unusual example of a substantial residence from the period in Queensland. Its poured-concrete construction and distinctive design principles distinguish Geeumbi from contemporaneous development in Queensland and bares testament to the creativity of its owner and architect, Dr T.A. Price, as a residence of great individuality and innovation.

The place has a special association with the life or work of a particular person, group or organisation of importance in Queensland's history.

Geeumbi has special association with the life and work of Dr T. A. Price who was an influential member of the Toowoomba community, having been Mayor from 1918 to 1919 and a prominent medical practitioner who contributed highly to the local community. His memory is commemorated by the Dr Price Memorial Mothercraft Centre and by his association with Geeumbi as the house he designed and where he resided and conducted some of his work until 1954.
