= Rodway, Toowoomba =

Rodway residence, Toowoomba
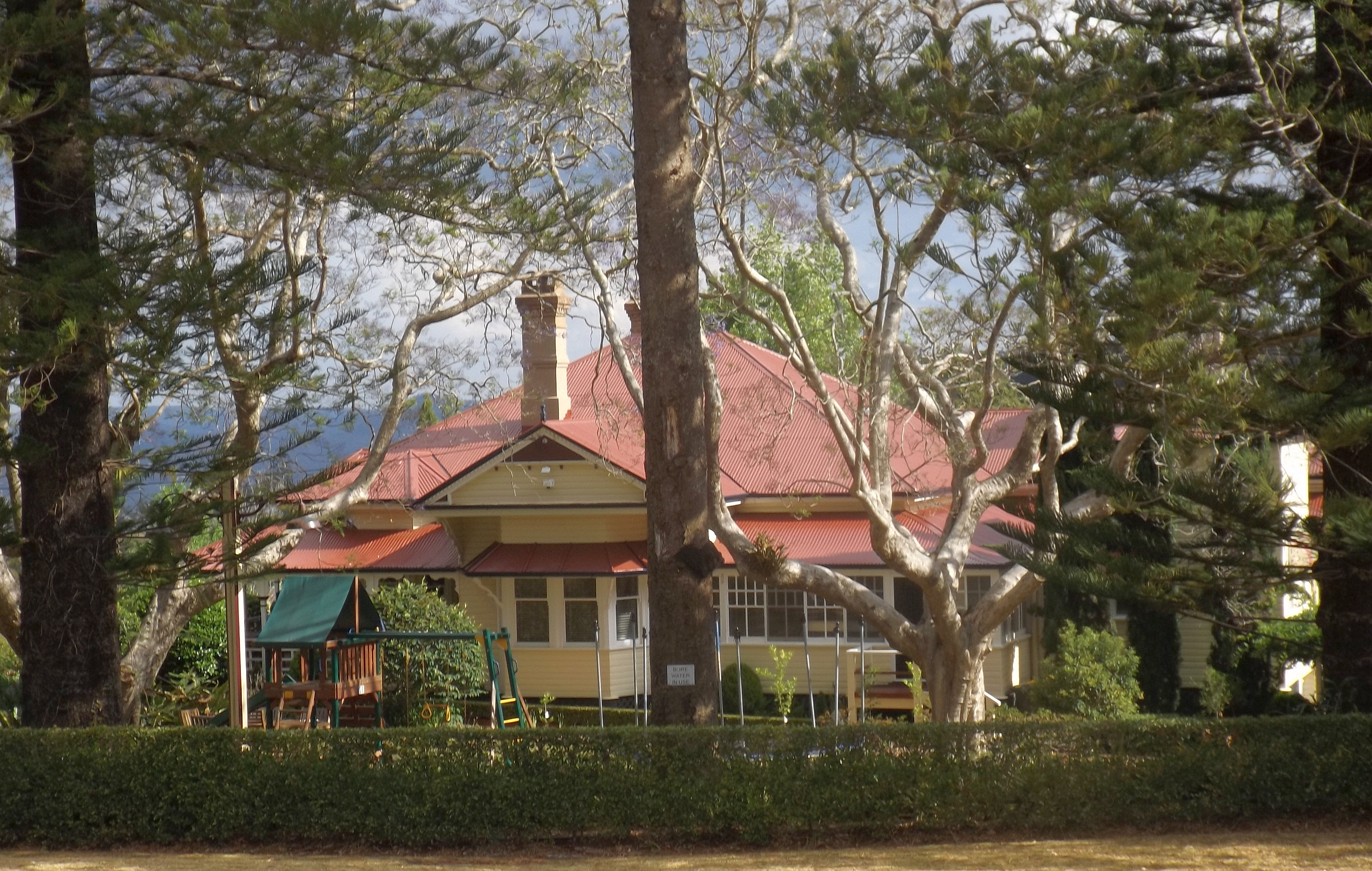
- Residence and gardens, 2014

- Location within Queensland Location within Australia
- 27.5842°S 151.9888°E
- Location: 2 South Street, Rangeville, Toowoomba, Toowoomba Region, Queensland, Australia

History
- Design period: 1900–1914 (early 20th century)
- Built: c. 1904–1930s

Site notes
- Architect: Harry Marks

Queensland Heritage Register
- Official name: Rodway, Sylvia Park
- Type: state heritage (built, landscape)
- Designated: 21 October 1992
- Reference no.: 600868
- Significant period: 1900s–1930s (fabric); 1900s (historical)
- Significant components: tank stand, residential accommodation – main house, service wing, driveway, garden/grounds, gate – entrance, garage, views from, drain/channel/ditch – irrigation, basement / sub-floor, garden edging/balustrades/planter boxes, trees/plantings, tennis court site, lead light/s

Rodway is a heritage-listed villa at 2 South Street, Rangeville, Toowoomba, Toowoomba Region, Queensland, Australia. The architect was Harry Marks. It was built from c. 1904 to 1930s. It is also known as Sylvia Park. It was added to the Queensland Heritage Register on 21 October 1992.

== History ==
Rodway is a single storeyed timber house erected c. 1904 for John Long to the design of architect Harry Marks on a 40-acre site on the Toowoomba Range.

The site was acquired by Long, a hotel keeper, in 1896. He had previously commissioned Marks' father, James Marks in 1885 to design the Imperial Hotel in Ruthven Street, which Long operated for a number of years.

In 1910, the property was acquired by grazier, John Oliver Frith and his wife Annie Peek Frith as a town residence. Frith lived in semi-retirement but maintained his Augathella property, Toolmaree Station. Renamed Rodway after his birthplace in Somersetshire in England, the house was described as one of the most picturesque and beautiful homes in the vicinity of the city. A gabled north projecting dining room bay may have been undertaken by Frith, and was certainly in existence by 1919. Interior alterations to the dining room may also have been carried out at this time. It is thought that the kitchen wing was added after 1904.

Members of the Frith family are recorded as living at Rodway until 1940 although it is believed the house was rented and used as a boarding house during the 1930s. About this time new fireplaces were installed in the living and dining rooms as well as a new ceiling in the living room. After the death of Annie Frith in 1952, the property was transferred to PJ Seymour, LH Corser, and Leo and Isabel Lynch. The property was subdivided and later sold, with the Lynches retaining the house on a 5-acre block, later reduced to 4 acres to allow for the provision of new roads.

The property was again subdivided in the mid-1990s, and the land the west of the house beyond the border of camphor laurel trees was removed from the heritage register in 1998.

== Description ==
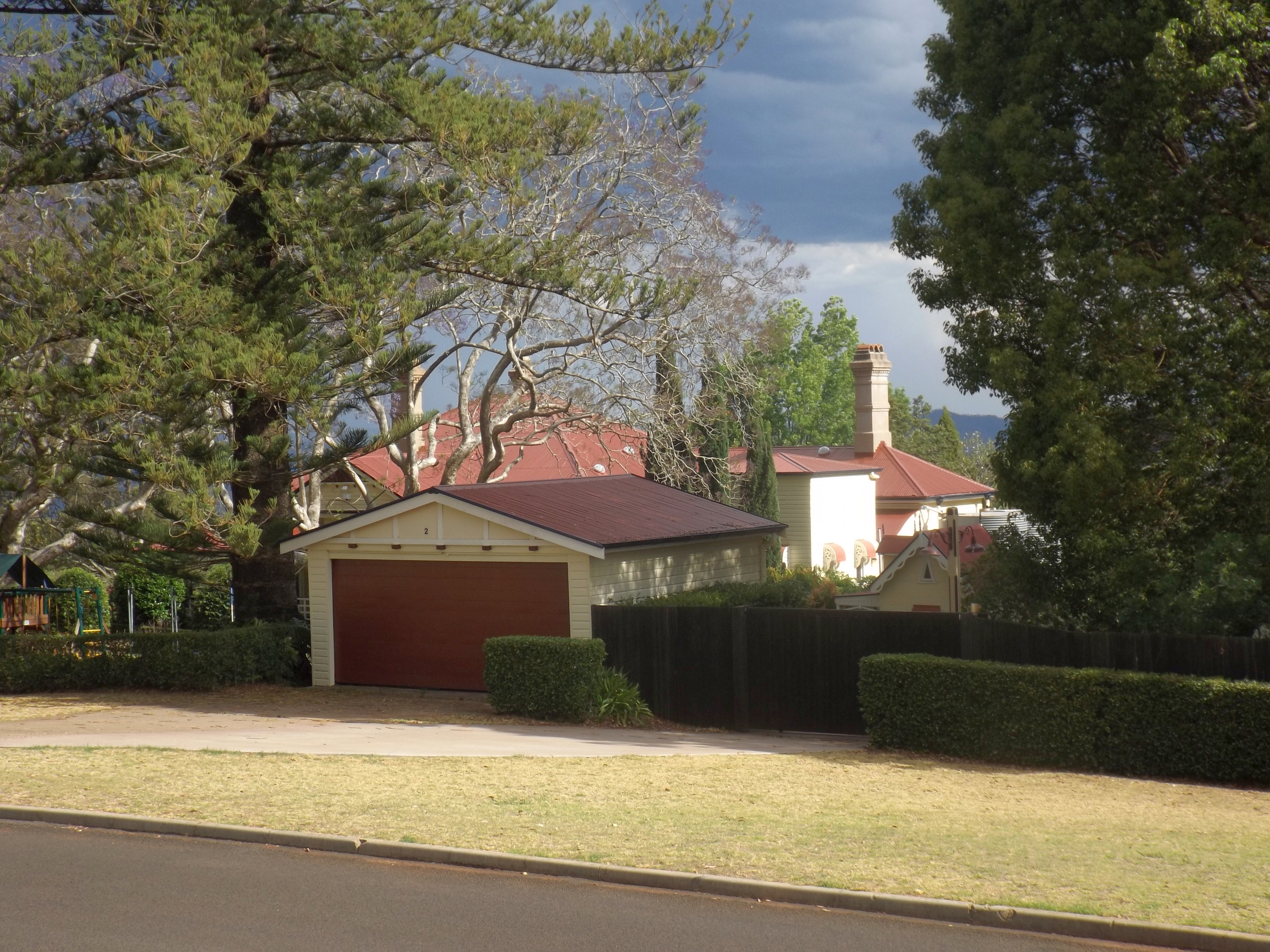
Gardens, garage and residence, 2014

Rodway is a single-storeyed chamferboard residence with a corrugated iron hipped roof and projecting north gable. The building, located on the Toowoomba Range, is situated on a south sloping site, overlooking the Brisbane Valley to the southeast, with a border of mature camphor laurel trees to the west boundary and Norfolk pines to the north.

There are verandahs to the south, east, northeast and northwest, and a kitchen wing and an attached enclosed tankstand to the west. The south and northwest verandahs have been enclosed, and the building has timber stumps with batten panel infill, except to the kitchen wing which has a brick base enclosing a laundry and store. There are three brick chimneys, of which the eastern two are cement rendered.

The symmetrical east elevation has a central porch with an ornately shaped timber surround and a wide flight of timber steps. The open verandahs have an unlined corrugated iron ogee shaped awning with timber posts, brackets and grid-like balustrade. A bay to either side of the entry, and one to the north, pierce the verandah awning and are hipped at the eaves. These bays, and at either side of the dining room, contain HJ Marks' step-out "disappearing" sash windows. The north projecting dining room bay is surmounted by a gable with timber brackets to either side and decorative timber bargeboard and finial, with an awning and timber brackets to the bay window below. The northwest enclosed tankstand is taller, and has a shallow hipped roof and pressed metal window hoods.

The main entrance has a panelled cedar door with leadlight fanlight and sidelights. Internally, there is a wide central hall with a timber arch, walls are of tongue and groove boards with painted timber architraves and skirting, and doors are panelled cedar with fanlights. The northeast room has arched divides to the bays, and later fibrous cement ceiling and brick fireplace. The southeast room has an arched divide to the bay, a white marble fireplace surround and more recent ensuite. The dining room has plastered walls and ornate, pressed metal ceiling and cornice. Pressed metal ceilings also feature in the enclosed verandah rooms off the south bedroom and ensuite.

The western verandah enclosures include a guest bedroom and storeroom in the tankstand, with the original verandah posts still in place. The kitchen has been remodelled and a bathroom added to the west end of the verandah, with the verandah having an ogee shaped boarded ceiling. Stairs lead down to the laundry, which contains the original copper, and store below.

A chamferboard double garage with a corrugated iron gable roof is located on the boundary to the northwest, with iron gates to the west which originally led to an avenue which accessed the former property to the southwest. The western border of camphor laurel trees remain, the southwest section of which is fenced off to form a horse paddock. The north garden contains two large jacaranda trees with pine trees along the boundary and a timber and wire fence. Garden beds with terracotta tile surrounds and brick drains border the north garden and the grassed driveway to the east. The southeast area of the site is lower and contains the remains of the original tennis court.

== Heritage listing ==
Rodway was listed on the Queensland Heritage Register on 21 October 1992 having satisfied the following criteria.

The place is important in demonstrating the evolution or pattern of Queensland's history.

Rodway, erected c. 1904, is important in demonstrating the evolution and pattern of Queensland's history, in particular the development of Toowoomba as the service centre for the Darling Downs Region, and the development of the Range as a prime residential area.

The place is important in demonstrating the principal characteristics of a particular class of cultural places.

It is important in demonstrating the principal characteristics of a substantial federation period timber house.

The place is important because of its aesthetic significance.

It is important in exhibiting a range of aesthetic characteristics valued by the Toowoomba community, in particular the form of the house and its relationship to the expansive southeast view, and the layout of the gardens and mature trees and their contribution to the streetscape of South Street and to the Toowoomba townscape.

The place has a special association with the life or work of a particular person, group or organisation of importance in Queensland's history.

It has a special association with the life of Toowoomba architect Harry Marks as an example of his domestic work.
