= Rangeville, Queensland =

Rangeville Toowoomba, Queensland
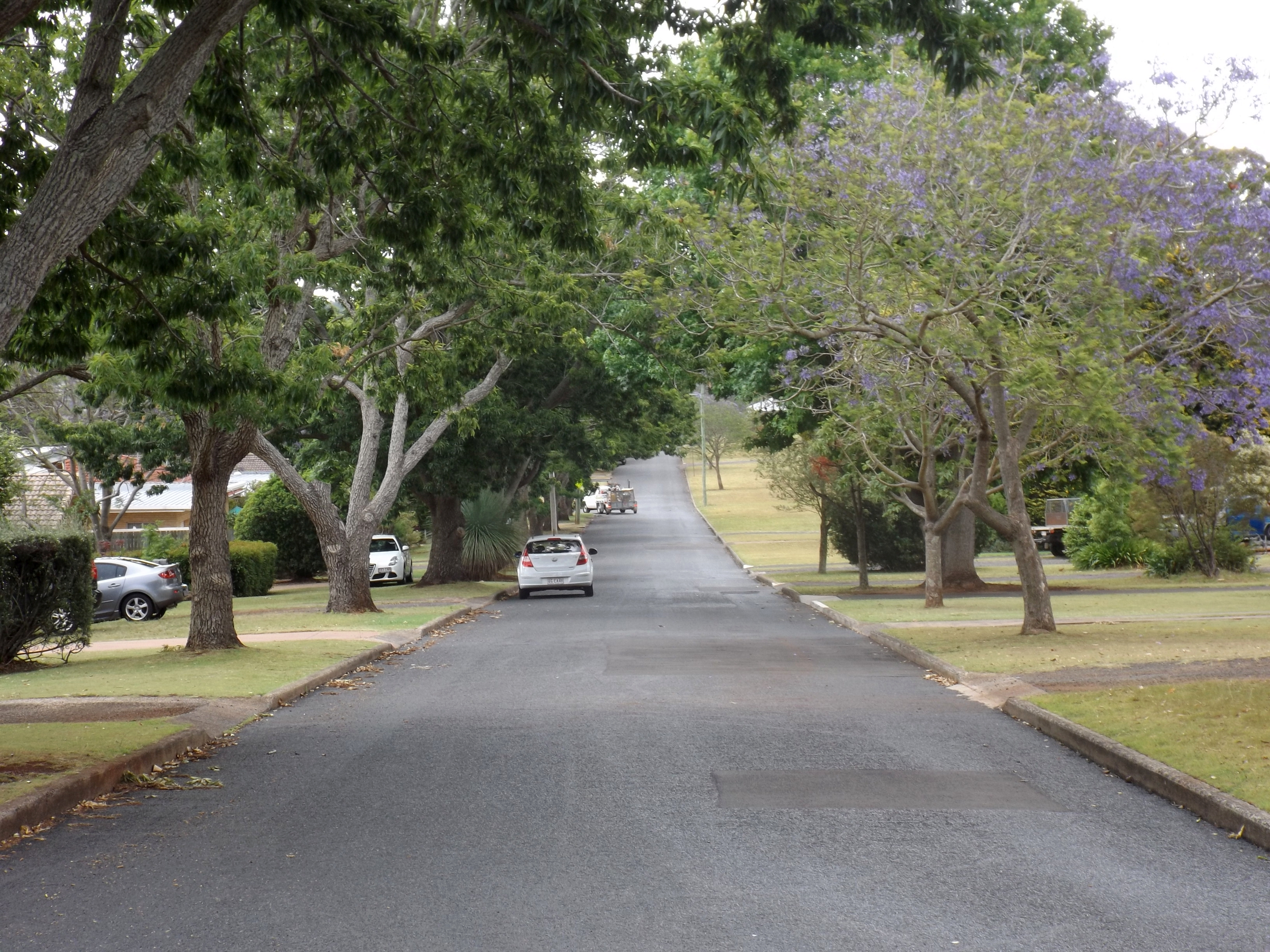
- Maker Street, 2014

- Coordinates: 27.5847°S 151.9911°E
- Population: 8,668 (2021 census)
  - Density: 1,057/km^{2} (2,738/sq mi)
- Postcode(s): 4350
- Area: 8.2 km^{2} (3.2 sq mi)
- Time zone: AEST (UTC+10:00)
- Location: 4.5 km (3 mi) SE of Toowoomba CBD; 127 km (79 mi) W of Brisbane
- LGA(s): Toowoomba Region
- State electorate(s): Toowoomba South
- Federal division(s): Groom
Suburbs around Rangeville:
East Toowoomba	Redwood	Withcott
South Toowoomba	Rangeville	Blanchview
Centenary Heights	Middle Ridge	Silver Ridge

Rangeville is a residential locality in Toowoomba in the Toowoomba Region, Queensland, Australia. In the 2021 census, Rangeville had a population of 8,668 people.

== Geography ==
Rangeville is located 5 kilometres (3 mi) south-east of the Toowoomba city centre.

The suburb's eastern boundary is along the top of the Great Dividing Range and is home to four reserves:

- Mount Tabletop (27.5825°S 152.01444°E) (also known by the Indigenous name or Meewah and also written as Table Top Mountain and Tabletop Mountain and formerly One Tree Hill) is accessible via two routes: Stevenson Street dirt carpark, or drive to the base of the mountain dirt carpark via South Street and Table Top Drive. The mountain was the site of the Battle of One Tree Hill in September 1843, in which a group of Aboriginal Australians under the warrior Multuggerah ambushed and routed a group of 18 armed men.
- Picnic Point Park, which has several lookouts, a restaurant and a bar. At Picnic Point a 150-foot flagpole was erected as part of the Q150 celebrations.
- McKnight Park.
- J. E. Duggan Park, named for former Labor Opposition leader, Jack Duggan, who represented the local area for over 30 years. The western boundary along East Creek is home to the Toowoomba Bicentennial Waterbird Habitat.

== History ==
As closer settlement moved further along the range from Toowoomba, the suburb appears to have been named Rangeville to distinguish it from The Range, which was the general term for the area along the Great Dividing Range.

The Range State School opened on 1 July 1909. In December 1909, it was renamed Rangeville State School.

On Saturday 20 April 1912, a stump-capping ceremony was conducted for the Rangeville Methodist Church. It was officially opened on Sunday 28 July 1912. A new church was built in 1963, becoming Rangeville Uniting Church in 1977 with the amalgamation of the Methodist Church into the Uniting Church in Australia. The church was at 13-17 High Street (27.5806°S 151.9784°E). In 2004, it became Rangeville Community Church, which established a new church complex in Mackenzie Street in 2011. Since 2010, the former Methodist/Uniting Church building is now a childcare centre.

In 1955 William Brennan, Roman Catholic Bishop of Toowoomba, invited the Christian Brothers to establish a boys' school in eastern Toowoomba. Three brothers were appointed and arrived in October 1955. The foundation stone for the school was laid on 15 December 1955. St Joseph's College opened in 1956 offering schooling from Year 4 to Year 12 with an initial enrolment of 116 boys. The official opening was held in September 1956 and was conducted by Bishop Brennan and James Duhig, Roman Catholic Archbishop of Brisbane. The Christian Brothers ceased operating the school in 1983. Other changes at that time was to phase out the primary school and make the school secondary only. The school also offered enrolment to girls.

In 1958, land was purchased for an Anglican church with an Anglican communion service being conducted on the site on 13 April 1958. The congregation bought the former Christadelphian Church in Herries Street, Toowoomba, and relocated it to the Rangeville site to use as a hall for both Sunday school and church services. By 1969, the congregation was able to undertake the construction of their first church, with St Mark the Evangelist's Anglican Church being opened and dedicated by Bishop John Hudson on Sunday 27 September 1970. Bishop Ralph Wicks performed the consecration on 29 August 1976.

== Demographics ==
In the 2016 census, Rangeville had a population of 8,312 people.

In the 2021 census, Rangeville had a population of 8,668 people.

== Heritage listings ==
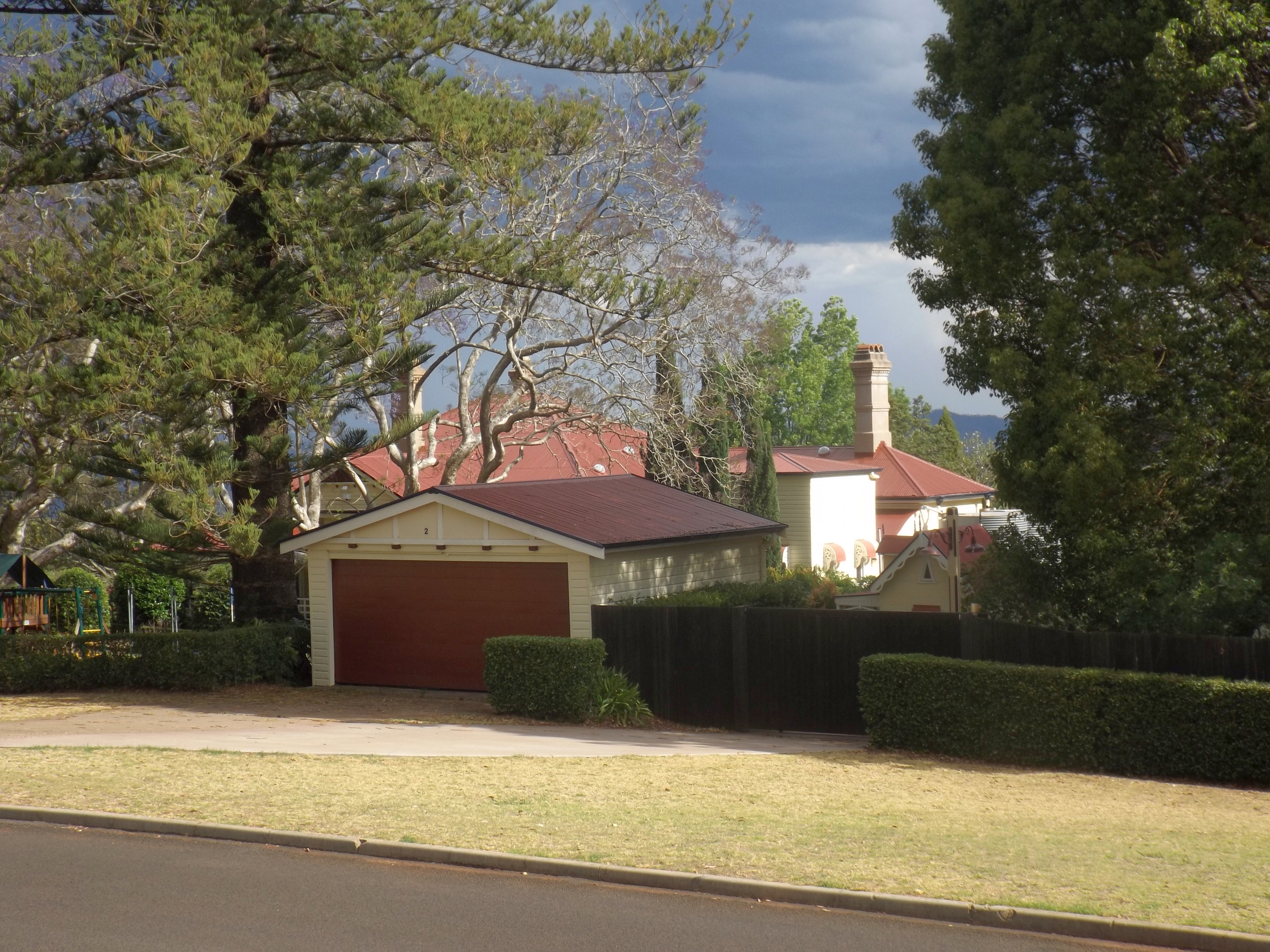
Rodway residence, 2014

Rangeville has a number of heritage-listed sites, including:

- Geeumbi, 1 South Street
- Rodway, 2 South Street
- Picnic Point and adjacent Parkland, 168 Tourist Road

== Education ==
Rangeville State School is a government primary (Early Childhood – 6) school for boys and girls at 32A High Street (27.5830°S 151.9783°E). In 2017, the school had an enrolment of 732 students with 58 teachers (51 full-time equivalent) and 32 non-teaching staff (23 full-time equivalent). It includes a special education program.

St Joseph's College is a Catholic secondary (7–12) school for boys and girls at 54 James Street (27.5715°S 151.9701°E). In 2017, the school had an enrolment of 801 students with 64 teachers (61 full-time equivalent) and 39 non-teaching staff (31 full-time equivalent).

There are no government secondary schools in Rangeville. The nearest government secondary school is Centenary Heights State High School in neighbouring Centenary Heights to the west.

== Amenities ==
There are a number of churches in Rangeville, including:

- St Mark's Anglican Church, 9-11 High Street (27.5799°S 151.9785°E)
- St Bartholomew's (St Bart's) Anglican Church, 103 Stenner Street (27.5970°S 151.9791°E)
- Rangeville Community Church, part of the Southern Cross Association of Churches, 362 Mackenzie Street (27.5944°S 151.9704°E)
