= Rodway =

Rodway may refer to:

- Eduardo Rodríguez Rodway (born 1945), Spanish singer and musician, former guitarist of the rock band Triana
- Florence Aline Rodway (1881–1971), Australian painter
- Frederick Arthur Rodway (1880–1956), Australian physician, botanist, and plant collector
- James Rodway (1848–1926), Guyanese historian, botanist and novelist
- Leonard Rodway (1853–1936), English-born Australian dentist and botanist
- Norman Rodway (1929–2001), Irish actor
- Steve Rodway (fl. 1980s–2000s), British electronic dance music record producer
- Tommy Rodway (1879–1959), English footballer
- Valerie Rodway (1919–1970), Guyanese song composer
