= Picnic Point, Toowoomba =

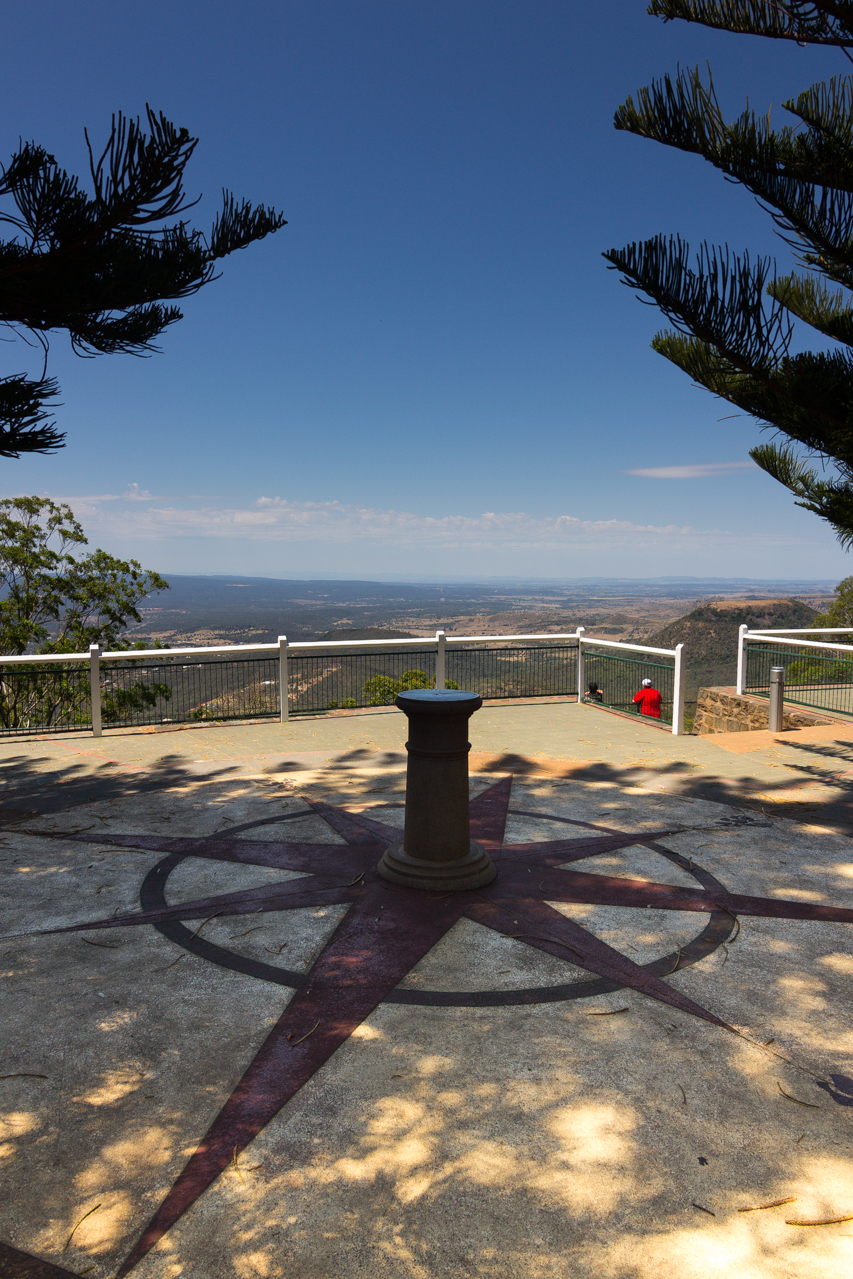
- Picnic Point Lookout, 2013

- Location within Queensland Location within Australia
- 27.5802°S 151.9875°E
- Location: 168 Tourist Road, Rangeville, Toowoomba, Queensland, Australia

Queensland Heritage Register
- Official name: Picnic Point and adjacent Parkland
- Type: state heritage (built, landscape)
- Designated: 13 November 2008
- Reference no.: 601205
- Significant period: 1880s onwards

Picnic Point is a heritage-listed park at 168 Tourist Road, Rangeville, Toowoomba, Queensland, Australia. It was added to the Queensland Heritage Register on 13 November 2008.

== History ==
Picnic Point and its adjacent parkland is today a reserve of approximately 65 hectares (160 acres) situated on the crest of a prominent bluff along the top of the Great Dividing Range at Toowoomba. The site was selected by William Henry Groom, the first Lord Mayor of Toowoomba in consultation with WC Hume, the then Commissioner of Crown Lands on the Darling Downs as being "one of great beauty, easy of access, commanded splendid views of the deep gorges of the Main Range and the hills below it, and was the recreational resort of the people for a days outing."

The word "picnic" has entered the English language via the French term picque-nique, a term which, by the early 1700s, had come to describe "an informal communal meal to which guests brought their own food, or paid for themselves at a restaurant, but which increasingly took place outdoors". Picnicking became a popular leisure activity in Britain by the 1800s and British immigrants to Australia found that the mild climate, seemingly "boundless" opportunities for the provision of public open space, particularly in attractive settings, offered many opportunities to continue with this tradition. Picnics at public parklands or reserves offered people the opportunity to enjoy the company of large gatherings of families and friends in congenial surroundings, or for particular interest groups to socialize. It is of note that from the time the first portion of 38 acres (15 ha) of this reserve was set aside in 1886 that the name given to the area was Picnic Point.

In 1888 the citizens of Toowoomba and surrounding districts petitioned Henry Jordan, the Minister of Lands to convey in perpetuity to the Municipal Council in Trust for the inhabitants of Toowoomba and district and to be devoted solely for the purpose of a public park, approximately 2,000 acres (810 ha) of Main Range escarpment lands, at the time designated within the Toowoomba Town Common. The reserve at Picnic Point and the escarpment area below it were included in the lands identified by this petition. The petitioners described the land as follows, "...a piece of land replete with beauty, and full of picturesque effects, such as, are most charming to the eye, and gratifying to the lover of landscape variety, - grassy slopes and rugged mountain gullies, clothed with verdant scrubs, and down which flow rippling streams from natural springs.

This spot is the favorite resort of pleasure seekers during the holidays, pic-nic parties and lovers of forest scenery: our children and hundreds of whom associate together for games and frolic may frequently be seen enjoying themselves and disporting on the grass and under the shade of the noble trees.

We are extremely anxious that this beautiful piece of land should be secured in such a manner as to remain an appendage to this town for the enjoyment of future generations.

Toowoomba is fast becoming a favorite temporary residence for our fellow colonists, especially from the north, for the purpose of renewing their health and vigour, and we are sure its reputation in this respect will be enhanced were it to become known that the town was in possession of so delightful a place for them to enjoy the gratification of such unrivaled scenery."

The wording of this petition strongly embodies two concepts emerging in British society (and consequently disseminated across the Empire) from the early nineteenth century. These concepts include a penchant for the seeking out and appreciation of the picturesque qualities of natural landscapes and a firm conviction that the general health of people could be enhanced if they spent more time outdoors. The petition appears not to have been acted on but nevertheless the initial reserve of 38 acres (15 ha) has been steadily added to over the intervening years.

Adjacent industry in the form of a quarry does not seem to have detracted from the scenic beauty of Picnic Point at the time the petition was presented, or perhaps the reason is that the location of the quarry below the escarpment meant that its workings did not visually intrude on the expansive outlook from the public reserve. Formal application was made to the Under Secretary for Lands by the Middle Ridge Shire in 1890 for permission to include "the old quarry" in their application for use of "about five acres of vacant land near Picnic Point for the quarrying of suitable stone for roads". Council records indicate that in 1912 the Council works committee directed that 20 chains (1,300 ft; 400 m) of Tourist Road be metalled using stone from the Picnic Point quarry. Quarrying operations ceased in 1940 and the area became part of the Picnic Point Park Reserve.

The elevated position of this land also saw it selected for the site of a Trigonometrical Survey Station between 1883 and 1891. This station was part of an ambitious plan set in train by Acting Surveyor-General Tully in response to the recommendation of an 1876 Royal Commission "that a comprehensive system of trigonometrical survey of Queensland would be economical and of benefit to the survey of the whole state". This survey work ceased due to lack of funding in 1891.

The first addition to the Picnic Point Reserve was made when the Municipal Council purchased two freehold allotments fronting both Heller and Rowbotham Streets in 1902. By 1906 the council had commenced tree-planting at Picnic Point under the supervision of Curator Harding of the Botanical gardens. A further expansion of the reserve was made in 1909. This resulted in a considerable flow of correspondence between the Toowoomba Town Council and the Lands Department concerning the boundaries of the addition as the initial gazettal had omitted to include a "bluff point" along the northern brow of Picnic Point. This was rectified in 1910 and the whole of portion 364 and parts (the brow of the bluff) of Portions 365 and 366 were now included in the Picnic Point Reserve. Also in 1910 the Picnic Point reserve was proclaimed as a "Reserve for the Protection and Preservation of Native Birds" under "The Native Birds Protection Acts 1877 to 1884" and a proclamation dated the 25 October 1905. Alexander Holtze writing in a commemorative publication to celebrate the jubilee of the establishment of the town of Toowoomba in 1910 commented, " There are numerous picturesque spots surrounding Toowoomba, notably Picnic Point, situated at an elevation of 2,300 feet - where there is a recreation reserve of 32 acres and from which wonderful panoramas of mountain and valley scenes are visible. This point of vantage is reached from the city by a drive through tree-clad avenues, which in a few years will form a noble thoroughfare."

It is conjectured that the avenue of mature hoop and kauri pine trees planted along Tourist Road on the approach to Picnic Point Reserve were planted during this period. Curator Harding planned and planted further ornamental trees at the park in 1913 for the Toowoomba City Council.

Although the crest of the escarpment was now secured and used extensively as a public reserve a substantial area of the adjacent parkland area of Picnic Point continued to be used as a grazing lease. In common with much of Queensland's grazing country in the early 1920s the land suffered badly from the infestation of prickly pear, particularly on the face of the escarpment. Visitors to the area saw this as a major visual scar on the landscape. Despite this situation in 1920 permission was granted by the Toowoomba Council, to lease part of the reserve as a park and to construct the first substantial kiosk building here. This building was completed in 1921 and leased by J McIntyre, initially for a three-year period. One of the conditions included in this lease was "That the leasing of the land will not interrupt or obstruct the free use of the Park for purposes of Recreation".

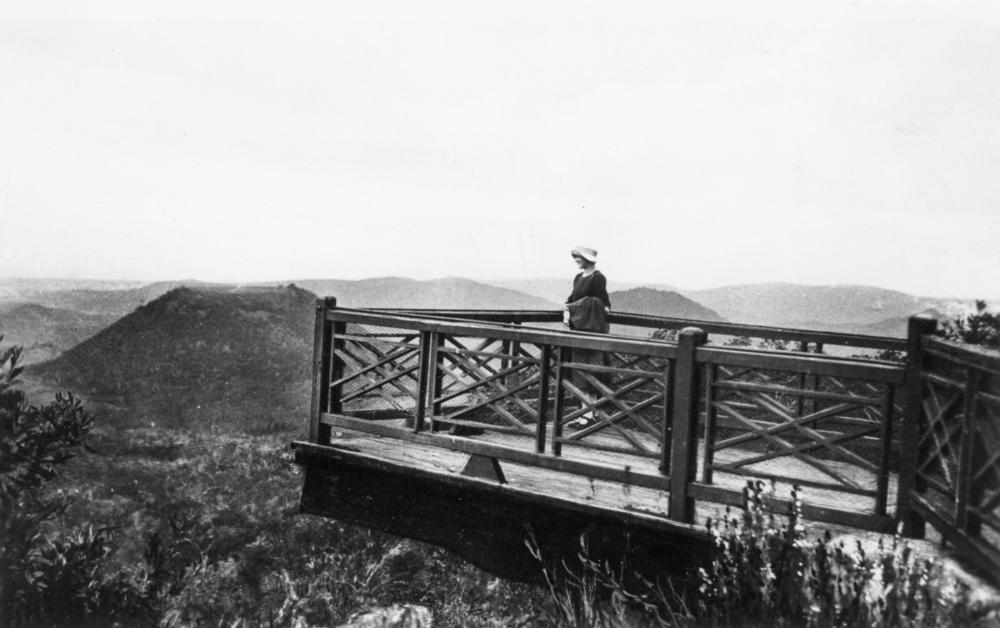
Lookout at Picnic Point, circa 1928

The Council also constructed a lookout platform in the vicinity, cantilevered out over the escarpment. It offered direct views to Tabletop Mountain and out across the Lockyer Valley. Construction of such facilities to support the recreational use patterns of established picnic grounds was typical of the 1920s and 1930s era. Lookout structures were popular additions to the designed landscapes of public parks, particularly if their siting was able to take advantage of naturally elevated vantage points. Frequently these lookouts were the most basic of structures such as the construction of a simple fence, or a low stone wall, built to ensure the safety of visitors while they enjoyed the views, rather than to make a design statement in their own right. Other examples of public lookouts established in Queensland, particularly in proximity to large urban settlements, are those on Mount Coot-tha in Brisbane and Castle Hill in Townsville.

In 1930 the Toowoomba office of Kodak (Australasia) Pty Ltd approached the Toowoomba City Council requesting permission to erect a Cairn at Picnic Point on which would be mounted a brass plate indicating the names and direction of numerous geographical landmarks visible from the point. Permission was granted with appreciation. The list of landmark directions suggested by the council was as follows: "Crow's Nest, Ravensbourne (NationalPark), Mt Taylor, Helidon, Gatton, Laidley, Brisbane, Cunningham's Gap, Warwick, Mt Barney, Mt Lindsey". Placement was suggested on "the Magnetic Meridan to simplify the placing in position". At the time of installation of this cairn efforts were made to identify the site of the 1891 Trigonometrical Survey Station and perhaps erect the direction cairn on this site. It appears that these search efforts were not successful.

Guide books for visitors to the area published regularly by the Toowoomba Tourist Bureau from 1926 to 1938 included a number of photographs taken from within the Picnic Point Reserve. Also included were numerous testimonies regarding the beauty of the vista from Picnic Point mostly from eminent British gentlemen who were visiting the area.

As with so many public lands in Australia facilities at Picnic Point were improved using relief labour during the depression of the 1930s. An area of steep ground south-east of the kiosk was identified as a suitable site for leveling for a camping ground. The City Engineer's report of 1936 notes, "The area suggested, which is just SE from the kiosk yard, is very steep and consequently would provide shelter from the west when completed. From clinometer readings and paced distances, it appears that an area about 66' wide and 180' long could be leveled off. At some points the batters would be up to 15' in height and nearly c. 2000.yds of excavation would be required.". A letter on file from a camper in 1938 congratulates Toowoomba Council for the provision of such good camping facilities at Picnic Point.

The site saw camping of another kind during World War II. The First Australian Army troops took over the lease of the kiosk and occupied the area in general from April 1942 to December 1943. In correspondence to Toowoomba City Council in September 1944 the Rangeville Progress association complained: "At the present time the reserve is still practically in the same state that it was when vacated by the military. The fences have not been repaired where they were taken down, and cars and trucks now run throughout the whole of the park. ...thereby spoiling the natural beauty of the park. The association suggests that the fences be repaired and campers be confined to the area previously reserved for them, before the military took control, and the large pits filled in and leveled off.".

It does appear however that these parklands largely escaped the fate suffered by many large public parks in Australia after 1945, during a period of municipal rationalization in terms of limiting ongoing financial commitments to community services. Extensive ornamental display gardens which had benefited from maintenance using public works programs during the depression years were either simplified or removed. Low maintenance "shrubberies" became popular in their stead and a good deal of the public open space was regarded as potential "development" sites and in-filled with the construction of various community facilities. Picnic Point continued as a popular destination for both residents of and visitors to Toowoomba. A new lease agreement was signed for the operation of the kiosk area in 1948. New lands were added to the parklands in 1949 with the resumption for recreational purposes of two blocks of land fronting Rowbotham Street by the Toowoomba City Council. This is the present day Heller Street Park Precinct. A report from a Land Ranger to the Land Commissioner in 1951 notes that the land is "...used extensively as a tourist attraction because of the wonderful view of the Lockyer Valley one gets from the high plateau." and that the grazing lease to the bulk of the reserve did not interfere with public use in that there was "evidence of many campfires and other picnic facilities all over the slopes and gorges."

Intensity of use appears to have increased over the ensuing decade, fuelled by a substantial increase in private car ownership. In 1951 the RSL developed a proposal in conjunction with architect MC Williamson for the erection of a memorial beacon on Picnic Point. This does not appear to have ever been constructed.

In 1954 the Council successfully petitioned for a Queensland Government loan to fund substantial improvements to the parklands at Picnic Point., including the construction of paved and kerbed pathways: around edge of cliff to lookout and open air cafes, from about centre of parking area to lookout, and to the existing sanitary block.

1955 saw requests for permanent band seating from the Toowoomba Municipal Band and a request for additional shade trees from the United Executive and Progress Associations. In 1956 application was made to State Treasury for loan funds for the construction of a new kiosk at Picnic Point. By May 1957 the loan had been raised and the plans for the building completed by the City Architect, L Grienfel. In conjunction with these new works a request from a Lions Club to construct and operate a Wishing Well in the vicinity of the new kiosk was agreed to. The newly formed Picnic Point-Rangeville Progress Association requested that the old kiosk be removed to a nearby site to be used as the Progress Association Hall. (The result of this request is not known). The new kiosk building was opened by Mayor Alderman JF McCafferty on 13 September 1958.

Picnic Point and its adjacent parklands continued their popularity as a function venue for businesses, organisations and community gatherings and celebrations but cars were no longer allowed to be parked on the lawn under the shade of the trees. Records indicate that a grazing lease over the bulk of the property was relinquished in 1959.

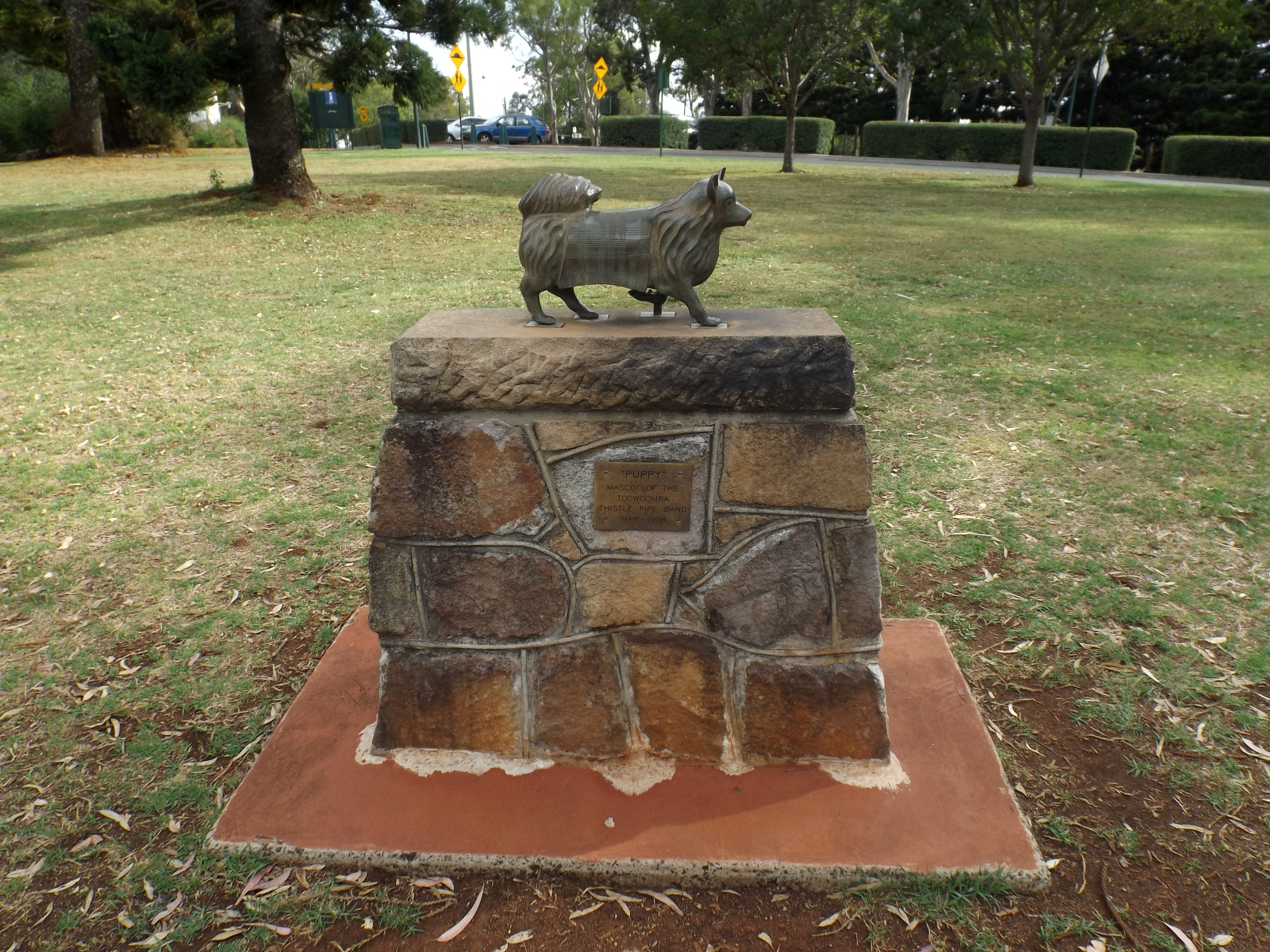
Memorial to "Puppy" mascot for the Toowoomba Thistle Pipe Band, 2014

The "Puppy Memorial" to the mascot of the Toowoomba Thistle Pipe Band was erected in 1959 (not at its current location). Since 1950, the band's drum major, Hugh Morgan, used his dog Puppy to lead the band in the annual Carnival of Flowers parade. Puppy wore a rug of the band's tartan and was a favourite with the public. During the 1958 parade, Puppy was hit by a car and killed; his death greatly saddened the community. The statue was stolen in 1983 and again in 1990 but was recovered on both occasions.

The 1960s saw more construction works at Picnic Point. In 1963 a special reserve for Water Supply Purposes was excised from the park and the distinctive "mushroom" style water tower constructed. Tobruk Memorial Drive was opened and declared a road excised from the reserve. This allowed vehicular access to extensive undulating and shady grassed picnic areas with extensive views across the Lockyer Valley and to Tabletop Mountain. This extension of formal access into a bushland area of parklands to facilitate its use for recreation coincided with the general understanding developing at the time in the wider Australian community of the environmental value and quiet beauty inherent in the Australian bush. Over a number of years members of the Toowoomba West Lions Club have continued to maintain and enhance this area as a major bushland picnic facility. In stark contrast to this voluntary work to restore and enhance the natural habitat at Tobruk Drive more designed site beautification work was carried out to the Lion's Park in 1965 when a waterfall feature was opened at the site of the old quarry on the northern face of the escarpment at Picnic Point. The project was sponsored by the Carnival of Flowers Association.

Additions to the parklands continued in the 1970s. In 1974 application was made for the erection of a small television tower off Tobruk Drive. Construction was completed in 1975. The kiosk building was damaged by fire in 1976 and application subsequently made for substantial renovation and extension work on the building in 1977. This work again included associated external works of "hot water supply and barbecue at Picnic Point ($5,000)", "kerbing, pathways and beautification around Picnic Point toilet block ($3454)". Toowoomba East Rotary Club sought permission in 1977 to construct and operate an amusement park in the Tobruk Memorial Drive area of the parklands. This was refused by the Toowoomba City Council on the grounds that "the proposal by the Rotary Club is in effect a commercial enterprise and would deprive the general public of free and unrestricted use of this particular part of the reserve."

In 1985 Tobruk Memorial Drive was closed as a public road where it entered the parklands but remained as an access track to the picnic facilities established adjacent to it.

By 1988 the 1978 extensions to the kiosk building were considered no longer adequate to cater for the visitor demand on facilities being experienced at Picnic Point and once again Toowoomba City Council called tenders "for the redevelopment of the existing Picnic Point Restaurant incorporating catering and tourist facilities. It is also proposed to extend the present lease area of 1899m2 to 3500m2 ". Responses to this advertisement by potential developers for the new facilities triggered a long-running and bitter public debate within the Toowoomba Community. The redevelopment scheme supported by the then Mayor and a number of councillors involved the construction of high rise accommodation facilities along with supporting tourist facilities and function rooms. Headlines such as "Save Picnic Point from High Rise" appeared in the Toowoomba Chronicle in 1989. Debate was ongoing and the Picnic Point Preservation Group was formed in 1991. Lobbying of council and government concerns continued with the heading of an editorial in The Chronicle in May 1992 reading Picnic Point a "sacred site". Public outrage maintained its momentum with the presentation of a petition to the Toowoomba City Council from the Picnic Point Defence Group in December 1993 opposing construction of high-rise plans for new facilities at Picnic Point. By 1994 plans for the redevelopment of the site had been thoroughly revised and all talk of a high rise tower being built at Picnic Point had ceased. The 1958 kiosk facilities were finally demolished in 1995 to make way for the third kiosk building on the site. This was opened in 1996, a contemporary newspaper article noting that "...the building set into hill-top to avoid obstructing views from park behind." Further alterations to this building were proposed in 1998.

Once again in conjunction with the construction of a new kiosk building an upgrading of the external facilities in the park was undertaken. The furore over the plans for the new kiosk development had overshadowed ongoing improvements to the external areas of the parklands. New lookout platforms had been constructed on the escarpment walking tracks by the Toowoomba Rotary and Lions Clubs in 1990 and 1991. In 1995 Hassell Pty Ltd, a multi-disciplinary firm including the professional areas of urban design and landscape architecture, was commissioned to undertake a study of the parklands and propose a staged Master Plan to direct the scope and intensity of future landscape works in the park.

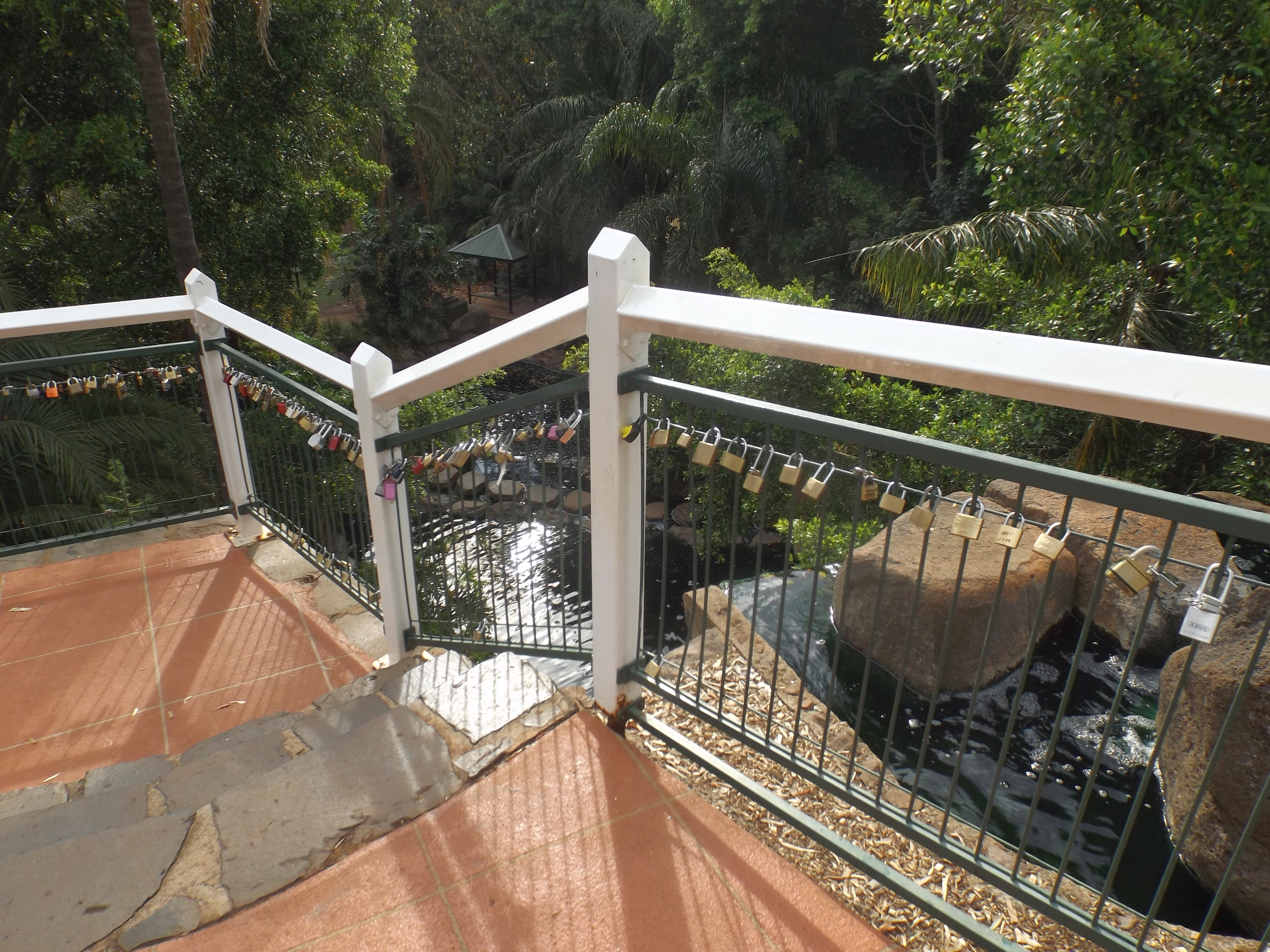
Love locks at the top of a man-made waterfall, 2014

The Hassell Master Plan to date has overseen the implementation of a number of recent changes to both the built and vegetative fabric of the parkland. A number of the changes to the vegetation were a response to better managing the health of the more mature plantings. Changes to the built fabric have included the minor re-sitings of the stone directional cairn and the Puppy Memorial in the primary viewing precinct and the demolition of the Camera Obscura, then inoperable, which had been a feature of the parklands for a number of years.

In July 2013, local couple David O'Shea and Leigh Thorpe were inspired by the love locks on the Pont des Arts in Paris to attach their own padlock to the lookout above the waterfall and throw the key into the waterfall below to symbolise the securing of their love. Since then, the lookout at the top of the waterfall has become a popular location for many other love locks. However, other residents have denounced the practice as having safety risks or being a form of vandalism.

== Description ==
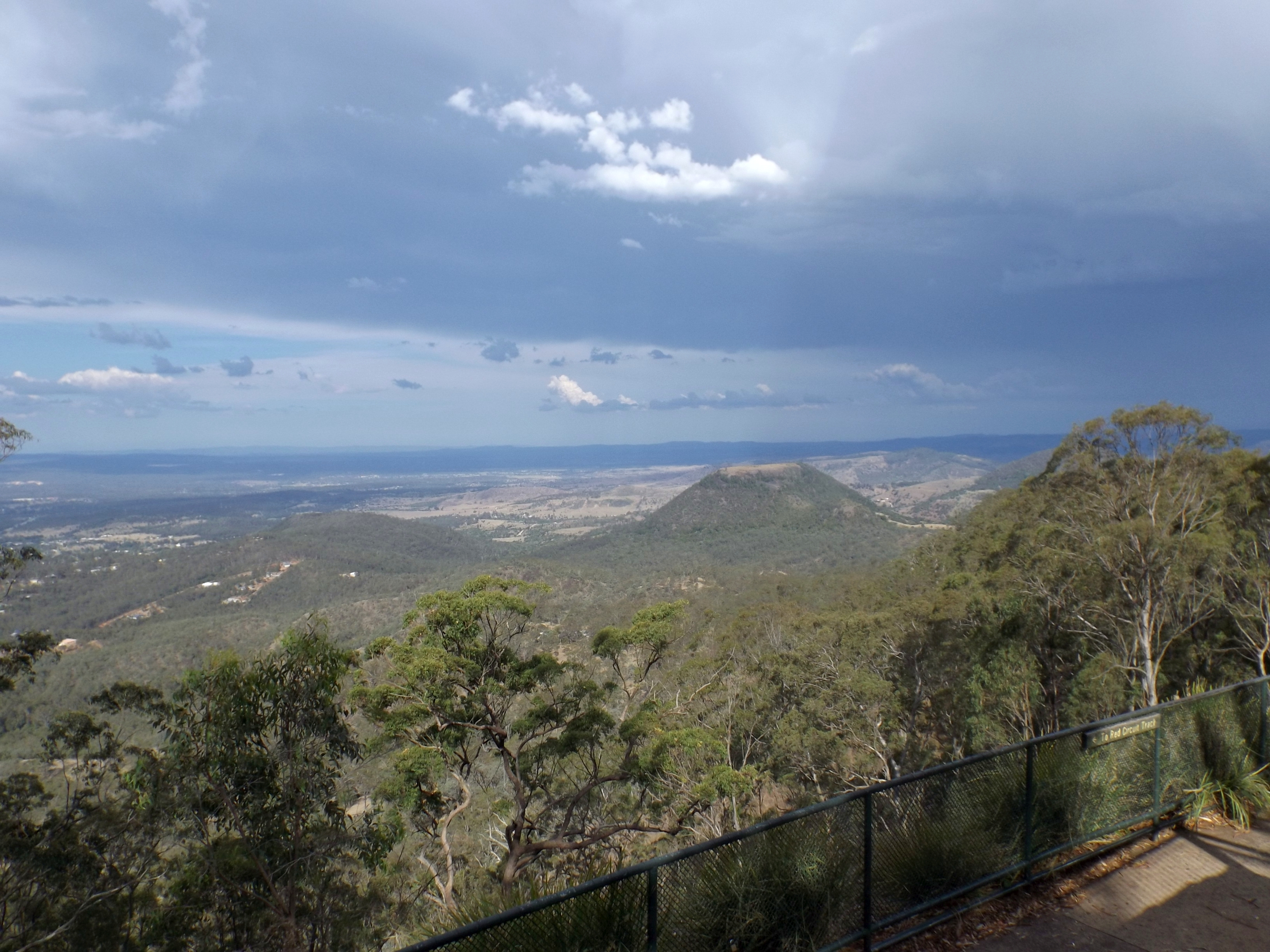
Southeast view over the Lockyer Valley from Picnic Point, 2014

As Toowoomba is approached by road from Brisbane along the Warrego Highway the bush-clad escarpment of the Great Dividing Range is sighted rising impressively above the Lockyer Valley. In recent years more cleared areas have been visible along the skyline of the escarpment and buildings are beginning to spill over this edge and dot the slopes with patches of unfamiliar colour. The well-established recreation facilities at Picnic Point are indiscernible from below to all but the informed visitor. This impression on approach conceals the intensity of the development of the recreation facilities and associated garden areas at the parkland from the visitor until the ultimate point of arrival is reached.

The final section of the roadway approach to Picnic Point and adjacent parklands is along Tourist Road through an avenue of mature hoop pine (Araucaria cunnninghamii) and South Queensland kauri (Agathis robusta) pine trees, conceivably the "noble thoroughfare" anticipated by Holtze in 1910. The first substantial area of parkland, known as Lions Park, is on the northern side of the road. Its western edge is an open grassy area with both exotic and native tree species planted here. There is a children's playground here and a substantial bluestone shed which stores a children's train, operated on week-ends by the Lions Club. Strolling east through this parkland the waterfall area is reached but this is not visible from the road approach.

The visual cue to the traveller of arrival at Picnic Point used to be the gentle curve of Tourist Road to the left as it narrows and becomes limited to one-way traffic through the central area of the parklands. In 2009 a 150-foot (46 m) flagpole was erected in the park to celebrate Queensland's 150th Birthday. The flagpole can be seen from far and wide including the highway leading from Brisbane. Traffic calming devices are also constructed across the carriage-way. Shrubs along the roadway to the north are heavily trimmed and shaped to a cylindrical form. Sweeping vistas over the escarpment to the north begin to open up. To the right (south of the roadway) is the area referred to in the 1995 Management Plan as the Central Precinct. This area is visually dominated by a dense canopy of mature Hoop Pines (Auracaria cunnninghamii) and Blakely's Red Gum (Eucalyptus blakleyii). There are a number of park fixtures installed under this canopy, including another children's playground, a band rotunda and strategically placed park bench tables and seating.

A small information shelter is situated on the left as the Primary Viewing Precinct is approached. Beyond this shelter a light eucalypt canopy and a new fence, designed to reflect the simple post and diamond placed top rail style of fencing which would have been used here earlier, mark the edge of the escarpment. To the right an access point pulls off this perimeter road to a car-parking area. Alighting from the car the visitor is drawn across the road and into the area which remains, and has been historically, the primary viewing precinct adjacent to the kiosk. A broad pathway leads to a stone cairn with a brass direction information plate on the top. Presumably this is the cairn provided by Kodak (Australasia) Pty Ltd. in 1930. It is from this vicinity that countless visitors over time have captured a signature photographic memory of Picnic Point against a backdrop of Tabletop Mountain. Early photographs indicate a lookout structure built out over the escarpment in this area but no immediately obvious evidence remains of this. Adjacent stairs descend to the pathway system along the face of the escarpment. Bluestone retaining walls in this area suggest that this path was part of the walkway system for which Queensland Government loan funding was requested in 1954. Located prominently to the left of the stone direction plinth is the Puppy Memorial, erected in 1959, initially installed closer to the kiosk, and moved to its current location in recent times. This new location would appear to closely correspond with the preferred site indicated by the Toowoomba Thistle Pipe Band in 1959.

The kiosk structure itself forms the southern boundary of the primary viewing precinct. The relatively minimum visual impact of the current building on the site belies what, in reality, is quite an extensive function and day-tourist service facility. This illusion is achieved by the construction of a substantial part of the facility being under the brow of the escarpment with pedestrian access drawn down into the lower service level. To the west of the kiosk is the distinctive mushroom-shaped water tower, visually dominating the built environment and today a key reference point within the Picnic Point parklands. The Picnic Point Complex has five function rooms and a very popular cafe, with views over the Lockyer Valley, that attracts tourists from all over the world as well as locals. www.picnic-point.com.au

The lower level of the kiosk structure, the main public eating area, leads out via a terrace to the north onto part of the escarpment walking track system immediately below the primary viewing precinct. At this point the path is fenced from the escarpment with chain-wire mesh fencing fixed to galvanized pipe posts and rails. Remnants of exotic vegetation, particularly of Bougainvillea creeper to the bank, are identified here. Walking northward along this track similar but more intimate vistas to the north are obtained to those from the primary viewing precinct above.

Further along the visitor enters the waterfall area on the site of the old quarry. This area is planted densely with tropical character foliage plants to both upper and under stories producing a cool shady pathway to the base of the waterfall. Large stepping stones are used to define the track around the base of the waterfall. A recent addition to the enclosed lawn area to the west of the waterfall is a small rotunda structure used as the focal point for celebrations such as weddings. Further westwards an informal track leads to the Bill Gould Lookout offering views down to the Warrego Highway below. To the south a lighted pathway and stairs, both paved with stone slabs, negotiate a series of low terraced garden beds through the shrubbery border to the enclosed lawn area, eventually leading the visitor along another formed pathway to the top of the old quarry and a viewing platform above the waterfall or across onto the Central Precinct area in the vicinity of the entry traffic island on Tourist Road.

The central precinct area is yet another component of these parklands with a particularly distinctive character arising from its designed landscape. As previously noted this area is visually dominated by a dense canopy of mature hoop pines (Auracaria cunnninghamii) and Blakely's red gum (Eucalyptus blakleyii) and there are a number of park fixtures installed under this canopy, including another children's playground, a band rotunda and strategically placed park bench tables and seating. Given the maturity of the dominant hoop pines and eucalypts here it seems reasonable to surmise that they are survivors of the "further ornamental trees" Curator Harding planned and planted at the park in 1913 for the Toowoomba City Council.

Returning to the car park at the top of the Central Precinct the visitor has the opportunity to explore the parklands further by car, along Tobruk Drive. This bitumen road is within the parklands and runs eastwards behind the kiosk along a gently dipping ridge, with a vegetation cover of predominantly open eucalypt forest. This area was grazed at least until the early 1960s. The ubiquitous natural bushland style of picnic facilities, popular since the raising of the awareness of environmental issues on the national consciousness, is installed in this area. Road edging is marked with low log barriers to prevent the entry of cars to the sweeping areas of shady lawn. Barbecues and park furniture are of a robust, basic and functional design as is the fencing and structure associated with the Bob Dodd's Lookout at the end of the roadway. To the south of the road a gully is being revegetated with rainforest seedlings with voluntary labour from the community and a small dam has been constructed at the foot of this gully to enable the seedlings to be watered as required. The Pardalote Walk meanders, as a graded track, along the bottom edge of the open northern picnic area here from the rear of the kiosk to the Bob Dodd's Lookout. From the Bob Dodd's Lookout the track leads around the ridge to the south to the rainforest gully and dam then joins the Fantail Circuit and eventually intersects with a Bridle Trail offering the enthusiastic hiker access to Tabletop Mountain. Other unnamed tracks criss-cross this escarpment area.

Returning along Tobruk Drive the visitor crosses Heller Street and enters the Heller Street Park precinct, part of the land acquired by the Toowoomba Council early in the twentieth century as an adjunct to the Picnic Point Reserve. This section of the parklands is not as intensively developed as other precincts however there is yet another large children's playground here offering a different range of activities to those available elsewhere in the parklands. The relatively open grassy expanse also offers the opportunity for informal ball games in this area. A new toilet block and parking area is located in the north-east corner of this precinct. To the west extensive views are enjoyed across the suburbs of Toowoomba. As the visitor leaves the park the avenue of mature trees along Tourist Road again closes in these vistas and completes the unique landscape experience of Picnic Point and its adjacent parklands as recognized and planned for over a century ago.

== Heritage listing ==
Picnic Point and adjacent Parkland was listed on the Queensland Heritage Register on 13 November 2008 having satisfied the following criteria.

The place is important in demonstrating the evolution or pattern of Queensland's history.

The sustained use of Picnic Point and adjacent parkland as a tract of contiguous land reserves devoted to the primary purpose of public recreation and to an appreciation of the natural landscape, demonstrates the enduring importance of this type of leisure and aesthetic activity for Queenslanders from the time of European settlement.

The place is important in demonstrating the principal characteristics of a particular class of cultural places.

Discreet areas within the parklands demonstrate the principal characteristics of a number of important principles and styles used in the design of public parks and gardens and broader scale recreational "natural" landscapes since the time of European settlement in Queensland.

The place is important because of its aesthetic significance.

The exceptional and expansive views available from Picnic Point encompassing a 180 degree view from north to south along the escarpment and foothills of the Great Dividing Range at this point, include views to the world heritage area of The Scenic Rim to the south and east of this point. The aesthetic significance of this place and its outlook has been attested to over time, as a tourist destination. Examples of the aesthetic significance of Picnic Point range from recognized literary and artistic accolades through to vigorous expressions of public sentiment.

The place has a strong or special association with a particular community or cultural group for social, cultural or spiritual reasons.

Picnic Point has a strong association with the Toowoomba community and is well known in Queensland and other areas of Australia, as an attractive public recreation area offering wide views of outstanding scenic beauty from the top of the escarpment of the Great Dividing Range across the coastal plains to the east.
