= Brightview, Queensland =

Brightview
- Suburb
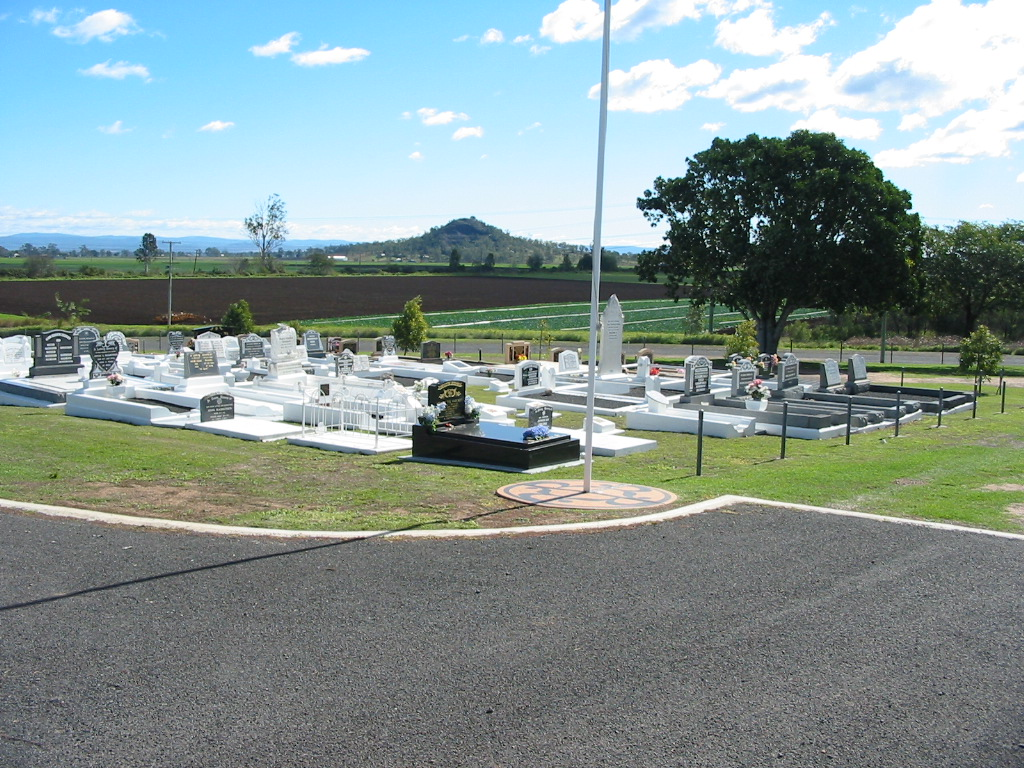
- Looking across Brightview Apostolic cemetery to the fields beyond, 2005

- Interactive map of Brightview
- Coordinates: 27.5147°S 152.4763°E
- Country: Australia
- State: Queensland
- LGAs: Somerset Region; Lockyer Valley Region
- Location: 12.5 km (7.8 mi) SE of Lowood; 27 km (17 mi) ENE of Gatton; 37.7 km (23.4 mi) WNW of Ipswich; 43.1 km (26.8 mi) S of Esk; 71.9 km (44.7 mi) W of Brisbane CBD

Government
  - State electorate: Lockyer
  - Federal divisions: Blair; Wright

Area
  - Total: 25.4 km^{2} (9.8 sq mi)

Population
  - Total: 911 (2021 census)
  - Density: 35.87/km^{2} (92.89/sq mi)
- Postcode: 4311
Suburbs around Brightview
| Mount Tarampa | Mount Tarampa | Rifle Range; Lowood |
| Lockrose | Brightview | Tarampa; Coolana |
| Regency Downs | Kensington Grove | Prenzlau |

Brightview is a locality split between the Lockyer Valley Region and Somerset Region, Queensland, Australia. In the 2021 census, Brightview had a population of 911 people.

== Geography ==
Brightview is a rural locality. The larger north-eastern part (15.9 square kilometres (6.1 sq mi)) is in Somerset Region and is mostly used for farming; that part is in the federal electorate of Blair. The smaller south-western part (8.5 square kilometres (3.3 sq mi)) in Lockyer Valley Region is more residential in character; that part is in the federal electorate of Wright.

The northern boundary is Lockyer Creek. Brightview Weir is located on the creek at 27.4965°S 152.5013°E.

== History ==
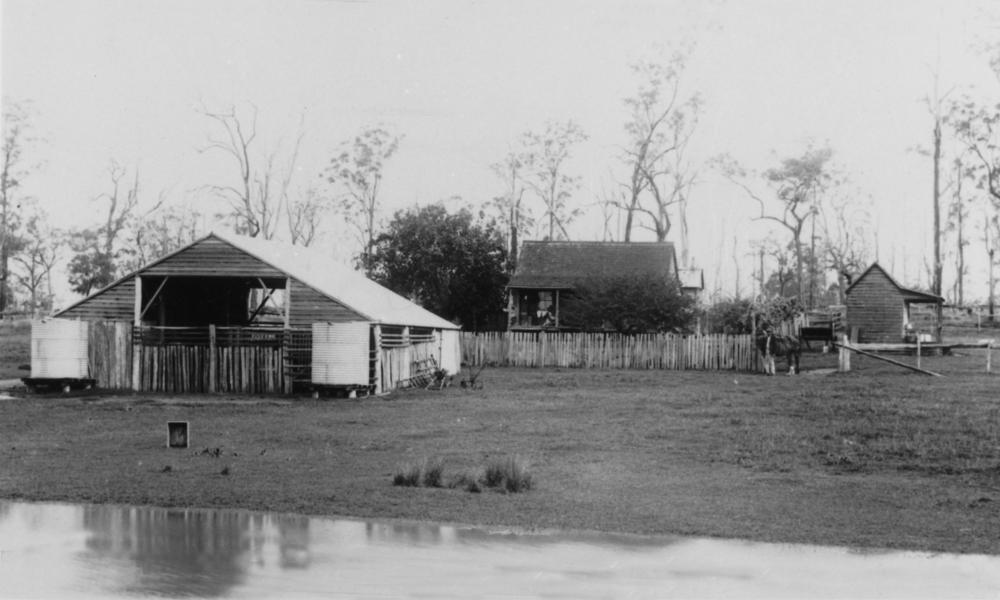
Brightview Farm, 1905

Brightview was originally named Tarampa Flats and then Lobethal. It is thought the present name was the name of a pastoral property owned by Ernest Christian Frederick Beutel. Due to the number of local areas which had "Tarampa" as part of their place name, local residents met in February 1906 to propose that their area had a new name and submitted a list of proposed new names to the Education department and the postal authorities. The name Brightview as the local place name is in use from at least July 1906.

Tarampa Flat Provisional School opened on 25 November 1902, being renamed Brightview Provisional School in 1906. It became Brightview State School on 1 January 1909. A new school building was erected in 1935. It closed on 11 May 1962. It was at 1060 Brightview Road (27.49938°S 152.49831°E).

By 1911, an Apostolic congregation was already meeting in Tarampa Flats. In 1914, the Brightview Apostolic Church was erected.

== Demographics ==
Population of Brightview
| Year | Population | Notes |
|---|---|---|
| 1911 | 131 | |
| 1933 | 180 | |
| 1961 | 158 | |
| 2001 | 675 | |
| 2006 | 895 | |
| 2016 census | 813 | |
| 2021 census | 911 | |

== Education ==
There are no schools in Brightview. The nearest government primary schools are:

- Tarampa State School in neighbouring Tarampa to the east
- Prenzlau State School in neighbouring Prenzlau to the south-east
- Hatton Vale State School in Hatton Vale to the south
- Lockrose State School in neighbouring Lockrose to the west

The nearest government secondary school is Lowood State High School in neighbouring Lowood to the north-east.

== Amenities ==
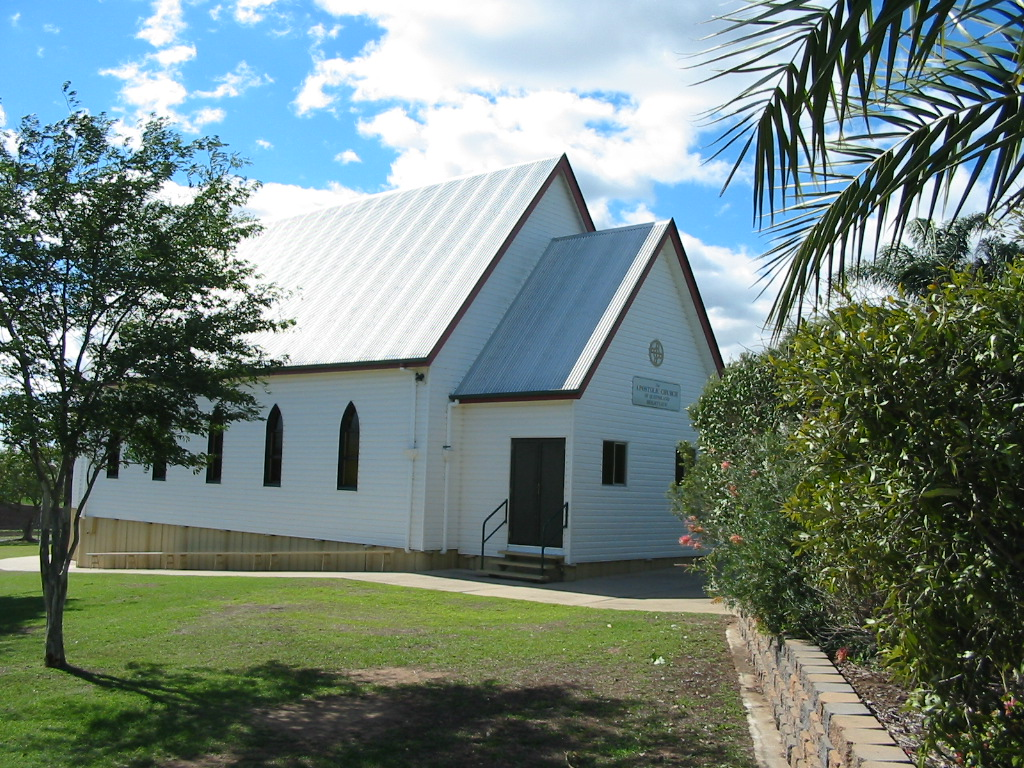
Brightview Apostolic Church, 2005

The Apostolic Church of Queensland has its Brightview church and adjoining cemetery at 22 Thorne Street just off Brightview Road (27.4887°S 152.5041°E).
