= Tarampa =

- Suburb
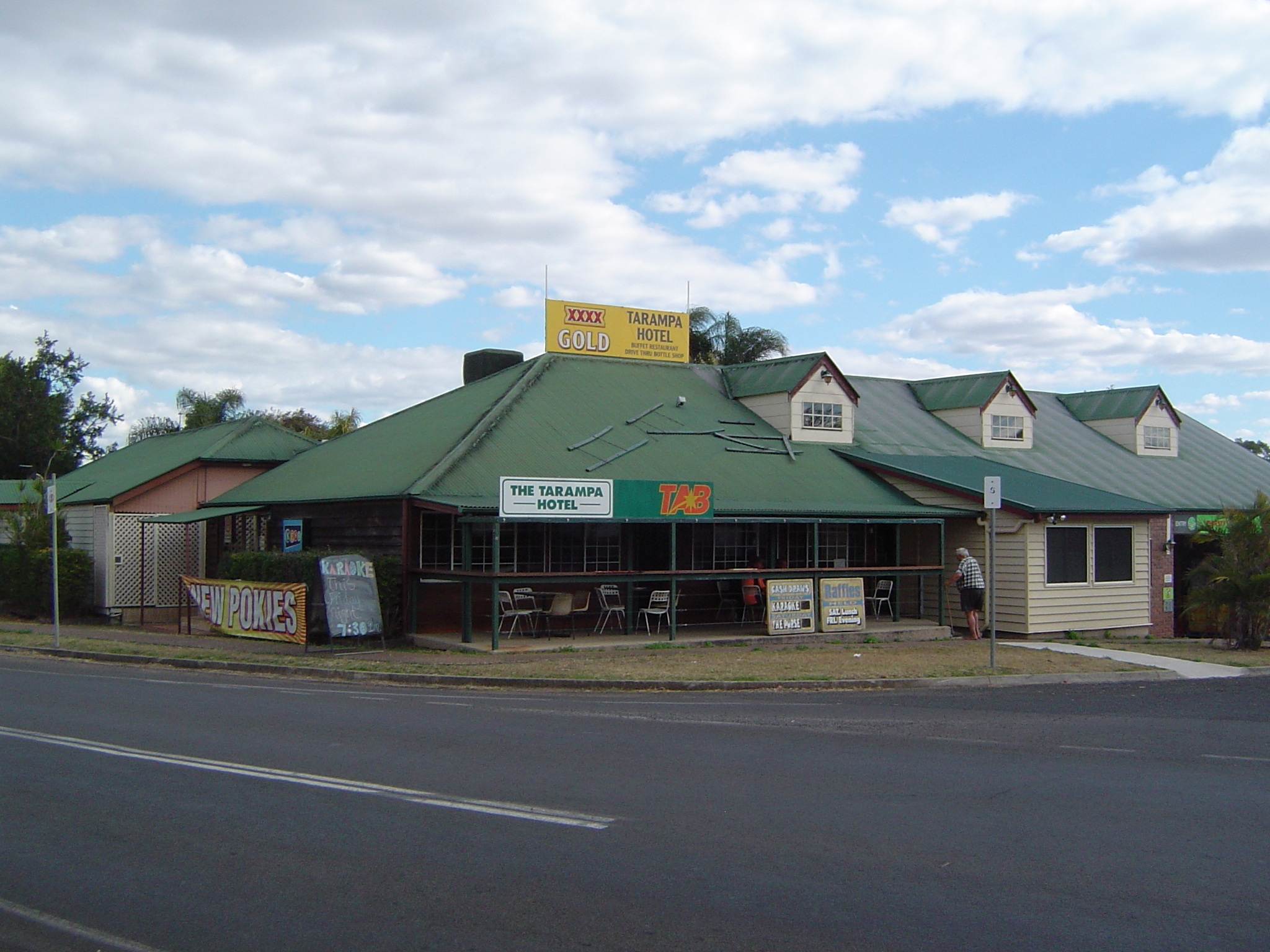
- Tarampa Hotel, 2014

- Interactive map of Tarampa
- Coordinates: 27.4977°S 152.5530°E
- Country: Australia
- State: Queensland
- LGA: Somerset Region
- Location: 5.1 km (3.2 mi) SW of Lowood; 33.9 km (21.1 mi) NW of Ipswich CBD; 41.3 km (25.7 mi) SSE of Esk; 68.2 km (42.4 mi) W of Brisbane
- Established: 1847

Government
  - State electorate: Lockyer
  - Federal division: Blair

Area
  - Total: 12.2 km^{2} (4.7 sq mi)

Population
  - Total: 287 (2021 census)
  - Density: 23.52/km^{2} (60.9/sq mi)
- Time zone: UTC+10:00 (AEST)
- Postcode: 4311
Suburbs around Tarampa
Brightview	Lowood	Lowood
Brightview	Tarampa	Glamorgan Vale
Brightview	Coolana	Coolana

Tarampa is a rural locality in the Somerset Region, Queensland, Australia. In the 2021 census, Tarampa had a population of 287 people.

== History ==
The locality presumably takes its name from its parish, which in turn was named after the Tarampa pastoral run named in 1847 by pastoralist Charles Cameron. The name is from the Yuggera language, meaning wild lime tree.

In 1877, 2,240 acres (910 ha) were resumed from the Tarampa pastoral run and offered for selection on 19 April 1877.

Tarampa Provisional School opened on 1 April 1880. On 1 July 1886 it became Tarampa State School.

During World War II, a military airfield was located at nearby Mount Tarampa called Lowood. The United States Army Air Forces based its 80th Fighter Squadron (8th Fighter Group) between 28 March and 10 May 1942, flying P-39 Airacobras. The airfield no longer exists but a small memorial marks its previous location.

The Lowood circuit built at the former airfield site was the venue for the 1960 Australian Grand Prix. The facility has since been closed and the land redeveloped. The end of the 35 runway and taxiway can still be seen in aerial imagery (27°27′19″S 152°28′56″E).

== Demographics ==
In the 2011 census, Tarampa had a population of 325 people.

In the 2016 census, Tarampa had a population of 289 people.

In the 2021 census, Tarampa had a population of 287 people.

== Heritage listings ==
Tarampa has heritage-listed sites, including:

- Tarampa State School, 18 Manthey Road

== Education ==
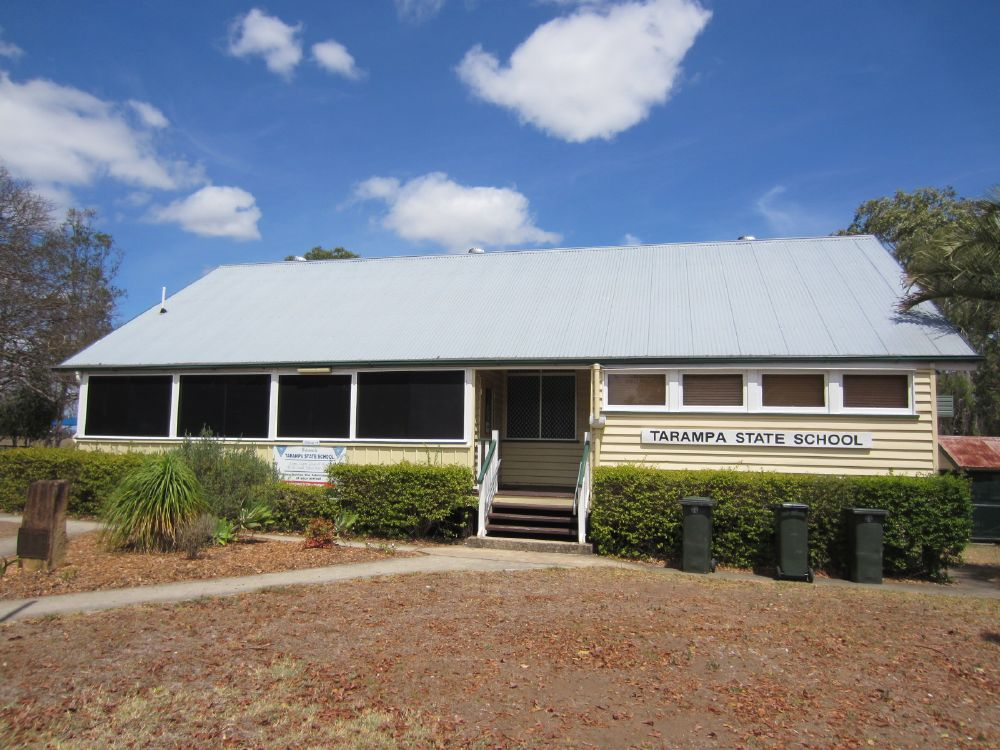
Tarampa State School, 2014

Tarampa State School is a government primary (Prep–6) school for boys and girls at 18 Manthey Road (27.4871°S 152.5461°E). In 2017, the school had an enrolment of 87 students with 7 teachers (5 full-time equivalent) and 6 non-teaching staff (4 full-time equivalent).

There are no secondary schools in Tarampa. The nearest government secondary school is Lowood State High School in neighbouring Lowood to the north-east.

== See also ==
- United States Army Air Forces in Australia (World War II)
