= Lynford, Queensland =

Lynford
- Suburb
- Interactive map of Lynford
- Coordinates: 27.4724°S 152.4480°E
- Country: Australia
- State: Queensland
- LGA: Lockyer Valley Region
- Location: 14.3 km (8.9 mi) W of Lowood; 22.3 km (13.9 mi) NE of Gatton; 46.2 km (28.7 mi) NW of Ipswich CBD; 58.4 km (36.3 mi) E of Toowoomba CBD; 83.7 km (52.0 mi) W of Brisbane CBD

Government
  - State electorate: Lockyer
  - Federal division: Wright

Area
  - Total: 3.2 km^{2} (1.2 sq mi)
- Time zone: UTC+10:00 (AEST)
- Postcode: 4342
Suburbs around Lynford
| Kentville | Mount Tarampa | Mount Tarampa |
| Kentville | Lynford | Lockrose |
| Kentville | Lockrose | Lockrose |

Lynford is a rural locality in the Lockyer Valley Region, Queensland, Australia.

== Geography ==
Lockyer Creek forms the southern and eastern boundary of the locality.

Forest Hill Ferndale Road passes through the locality roughly parallel and to the north of the creek.

The land is flat and predomninantly used for crop farming. The residential housing is mostly along Forest Hill Ferndale Road.

== History ==
The locality was officially named and bounded on 3 June 1994.

== Demographics ==
The population of Lynford is not separately reported in the Australian census. It is included in the census data for its neighbouring locality Lockrose.

== Education ==
There are no schools in Lynford. The nearest government primary schools are Kentville State School in neighbouring Kentville to the west and Lockrose State School in neighbouring Lockrose to the south-east. The nearest government secondary school is Lowood State High School in Lowood to the east. There are also non-government schools in Plainland, Laidley and Gatton.
