= Mount Tarampa State School =

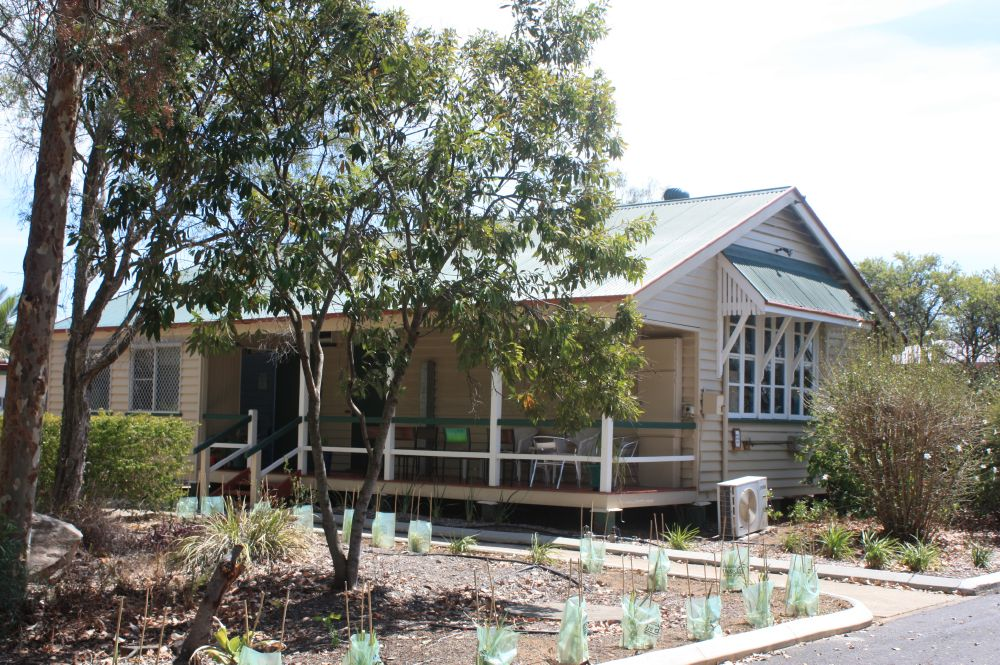
- Mount Tarampa State School, 2014

- Location within Queensland
- 27.4553°S 152.4895°E
- Location: 9 Profkes Road, Mount Tarampa, Somerset Region, Queensland, Australia

History
- Built: 1906, 1912, 1918

Site notes
- Architect: Queensland Department of Public Works

Queensland Heritage Register
- Official name: Mt Tarampa State School
- Type: state heritage
- Designated: 1 May 2015
- Reference no.: 602853
- Type: Education, research, scientific facility: School-state
- Theme: Educating Queenslanders: Providing primary schooling
- Builders: C Risdale

Mount Tarampa State School is a heritage-listed state school at 9 Profkes Road, Mount Tarampa, Somerset Region, Queensland, Australia. It was designed by Queensland Department of Public Works and built in 1906 by C Risdale. It was formerly known as Mount Tarampa Provisional School. It was added to the Queensland Heritage Register on 1 May 2015.

== History ==
Mount Tarampa State School opened in 1906 as Mount Tarampa Provisional School on a 2-acre (0.81 ha) site within the small agricultural settlement of Mount Tarampa in the Brisbane Valley, to serve the sparse but growing rural population. As settlement increased, the provisional school building was extended (c. 1916) and a teacher's residence was built (1918). Other structures and landscape elements were added including a play shed (1912), a tennis court (pre-1925) and plantings. The school has been in continuous operation since establishment and has been a focus for the local community as a place for important social and cultural activity.

European occupation of the Brisbane Valley dates from 1841. Charles Cameron established Tarampa station, a large pastoral lease stretching from the D'Aguilar Range to Glenmore Grove and from Prenzlau to Coominya, in the 1840s. Settlement in the Mount Tarampa area occurred when the Tarampa Repurchased Estate, comprising 17,432 acres (7,054 ha) divided into 144 properties, opened for selection in 1903. All of the blocks were occupied by 1909. Farmers in the area carried out mixed farming, dairying and grazing.

Mount Tarampa Provisional School opened on 23 July 1906 with 22 children attending in the first year. Construction of the Department of Public Works-designed provisional school building, on a 2-acre (0.81 ha) site purchased from James West, was undertaken by C Risdale for £101/10/0.

The provision of state-administered education was important to the colonial governments of Australia. Following the introduction of the Education Act 1860, which standardised curriculum, training and facilities, Queensland's national and public schools grew from four in 1860 to 230 by 1875. The State Education Act 1875 provided for free, compulsory and secular primary education and the establishment of the Department of Public Instruction. This further standardised the provision of education, and despite difficulties, achieved the remarkable feat of bringing basic literacy to most Queensland children by 1900.

The establishment of schools was considered an essential step in the development of early communities and integral to their success. Locals often donated land and labour for a school's construction and the school community contributed to maintenance and development. Schools became a community focus, a symbol of progress and a source of pride, with enduring connections formed with past pupils, parents and teachers. The inclusion of war memorials and community halls reinforced these connections and provided a venue for a wide range of community events in schools across Queensland.

To help ensure consistency and economy, the Queensland Government developed standard plans for its school buildings. From the 1860s until the 1960s, Queensland school buildings were predominantly timber-framed, an easy and cost-effective approach that also enabled the government to provide facilities in remote areas. Standard designs were continually refined in response to changing needs and educational philosophy and Queensland school buildings were particularly innovative in climate control, lighting and ventilation. Standardisation produced distinctly similar schools across Queensland with complexes of typical components.

In colonial Queensland, provisional schools were a convenient means of providing an elementary education for the small, scattered and often transient rural population and became an integral part of the educational landscape. A provisional school could be opened with as few as 15 (later 12) pupils. The Board of Public Instruction gave financial assistance to local committees to set up and maintain these schools. The local committee provided a building and found a teacher, while the Board paid the teacher's salary relative to the number of pupils. If the local population declined, the provisional school closed at little expense to the Board. If the district or town developed, the provisional school was raised to state school status and provided with purpose-designed school buildings.

By 1892 the condition of provisional school buildings, which formed almost half of the colony's schools, was an embarrassment to the Department of Public Instruction. A recommended plan was introduced in 1892 to try to improve matters. This standard type (B/T6) was for a small low-set timber framed and clad building with a gable roof. It accommodated one large classroom 21 by 14 feet (6.4 m × 4.3 m) with a front verandah, although a rear verandah was sometimes provided. The building was of single-skin construction and lined externally with chamferboards. The building had few windows and ventilation was provided by a high-level louvred vent in the gable end wall. These were often a huge improvement over the previous provisional school buildings and were constructed until c. 1910. The Mount Tarampa building was a typical provisional school building (type B/T6) similar to the standard plan introduced by the Department of Public Instruction. It was a single room, gable roofed structure of the above dimensions, with a front verandah, 7 by 21 feet (2.1 m × 6.4 m), and a central doorway. A water tank and outbuildings were also provided.

Mount Tarampa Provisional School was re-designated as a state school in 1909. In that year, the Department of Public Instruction upgraded the majority of provisional schools to state school status by lowering the required minimum average number of pupils for a state school from 30 to 12, gradually providing these schools with new buildings designed and constructed to government standards. At Mount Tarampa, a rear verandah and a new central doorway were added to the school building, with partial corner enclosures for hat rooms. The school was also painted.

The Queensland education system recognised the importance of play in the school curriculum and, the need for all-weather outdoor space. Playsheds were designed as free-standing shelters, with fixed timber seating between posts and earth or decomposed granite floors that provided covered play space and doubled as teaching space when required. These structures were timber-framed and generally open sided, although some were partially enclosed with timber boards or corrugated galvanised iron sheets. The hipped (or less frequently, gabled) roofs were clad with timber shingles or corrugated iron. Playsheds were a typical addition to state schools across Queensland between c. 1880s and the 1950s, although less frequently constructed after c. 1909, with the introduction of highset school buildings with understorey play areas. Built to standard designs, playsheds ranged in size relative to student numbers. A playshed, constructed at Mount Tarampa School by C Risdale, was completed by March 1912. The playshed was built to a standard 6-post design. It was 24 by 12 feet (7.3 m × 3.7 m), constructed of exposed timber framing and had a hipped roof.

By 1914 there were 52 children attending Mount Tarampa State School, necessitating the use of the verandahs for teaching and prompting the School Committee to request an extension to the 1906 building. These extensions completed in July 1916 at a cost of £226 comprised: addition of a northern classroom, 19 by 22 feet (5.8 m × 6.7 m); lining of the classrooms and rearrangement of windows reusing the original windows; centring the stairs at the front (east) and rear (west) of the extended building; and installing new wash basins at either end of the rear verandah. The tall, timber-framed casement windows from the eastern and western verandah walls were repositioned to the gable end walls. Sunshades protecting the gable end casement windows were extended from one to three bays wide to accommodate the additional windows. Two timber-framed casement windows were installed at a high level at the northern end of the western verandah wall, and two at the southern end of the eastern verandah wall. These alterations were designed to allow maximum natural light to enter from the left hand side of each student.

From 1893 the Department of Public Works greatly improved the natural ventilation and lighting of classroom interiors, experimenting with different combinations of roof ventilators, ceiling and wall vents, larger windows, dormer windows and ducting. Achieving an ideal or even adequate level of natural light in classrooms, without glare, was of critical importance to educators and became central to the design and layout of all school buildings. From around 1909 windows were rearranged and enlarged to provide a greater amount of gentle, southern light into the room and desks were rearranged so the light would fall onto students' left hand sides to avoid throwing shadows onto the pages; this presupposed that all students were right-handed. This often meant a complete transformation of the fenestration of existing buildings. Windows were larger and sills were lowered to let in more light generally. Smaller classrooms were preferred as they were easier to light correctly. Interiors became lighter and airier and met with immediate approval from educationalists.

In 1918 a teacher's residence was constructed for £588 and was ready for occupation by February 1919. This two bedroom teacher's residence (type C/R2) was one of three standard designs created between 1894 and 1914. From the outset, teacher's residences were built to a standard regulated by the Board of General Education rather than a specific design, so the form varied with each commissioned architect. Initially, residences were most often attached as annexes to the classroom building, but from the 1880s were built as detached residences. These residences were similar to the vernacular Queensland house with few, if any, education-specific requirements or features.

Residences designed by the Department of Public Works' architects, were typically of a higher-quality in design, materials and construction than most similarly-scaled private residences. The detached teacher's residence was located within the school grounds at a distance from the teaching buildings, usually with a separate, fenced yard with gardens and trees. The designs ranged from one to four bedrooms and evolved simultaneously with the teaching buildings to keep up with modern needs and styles.

Mount Tarampa State School's growing student population resulted in additions and improvements to the school grounds during the 1920s. The average number of children attending increased to 67 in 1925, prompting the Committee to purchase 3 acres (1.2 ha) of land in 1922 for additional play space and a 1-acre (0.40 ha) horse paddock. By 1925 a tennis court had been built, which was used for school grade tennis matches.

The provision of outdoor play space was a result of the early and continuing commitment to play-based education, particularly in primary school. Trees and gardens were planted as part of the beautification of the school. In the 1870s, schools inspector William Boyd was critical of tropical schools and amongst his recommendations was the importance of the addition of shade trees in the playground. In addition, Arbor Day celebrations began in Queensland in 1890. Landscape elements were often constructed to standard designs and were intrinsic to Queensland Government education philosophies. Educationalists believed gardening and Arbor Days instilled in young minds the value of hard work and activity, improved classroom discipline, developed aesthetic tastes, and inspired people to stay on the land. Aesthetically designed gardens were encouraged by regional inspectors. Some mature trees exist in the Mount Tarampa State School's grounds, including a bunya tree (Araucaria bidwillii) and a large bottle tree (Brachychiton rupestris). Three large date palms (Phoenix dactylifera) stand in the residence garden.

In the post-war years, there was little change to the school. Although planned in 1937, a verandah and bathroom addition on the northern side of the teacher's residence wasn't completed until about 1955, to a cost of £994. With this addition, windows along the northern wall were replaced by half-glazed, six-light timber French doors.

Between the 1960s and the 1980s a modernisation of Queensland education occurred. The Education Act 1964 was a turning point and the first major update of Queensland education's governing legislation since 1875. Effectively, a new era of state education evolved with new architectural responses needed. The Department of Education (as it had been renamed in 1957) continued to give the responsibility of building design to the architects of the Department of Public Works. Due to new materials, technologies, educational philosophies, government policies, architectural styles, and functional requirements, the evolution of standard designs became more fragmented. Rather than "improving" on the previous designs, architects began to design on a relatively clean slate, inspired by new precedents. Fundamentally, timber construction was no longer favoured and buildings were no longer predominantly high-set. The mid-1980s brought additions to Mount Tarampa State School with a modular building and an extension to library added in 1986, while in the following year a covered play area was constructed.

In 1981, 75th anniversary celebrations were held on 18 July, including an official luncheon and a book printed for the occasion. In 2006 the school celebrated its centenary and produced a history of the school.

Between 2005 and 2014, the playshed was enclosed on all sides with part-height corrugated metal sheeting. A glass sliding door was installed on the northern elevation and sliding glass windows were added to the eastern and western walls. The timber posts are still visible on the interior, although the roof framing is concealed by a ceiling of flat sheeting.

In 2015, Mount Tarampa State School continues to operate and retains the provisional school building, playshed and teacher's residence. The school is important to the area, having operated from the site since 1906 and as generations of Mount Tarampa students have been taught there. Since establishment, it has been a key social focus for the Mount Tarampa community with the grounds and buildings being the location of many social events.

== Description ==
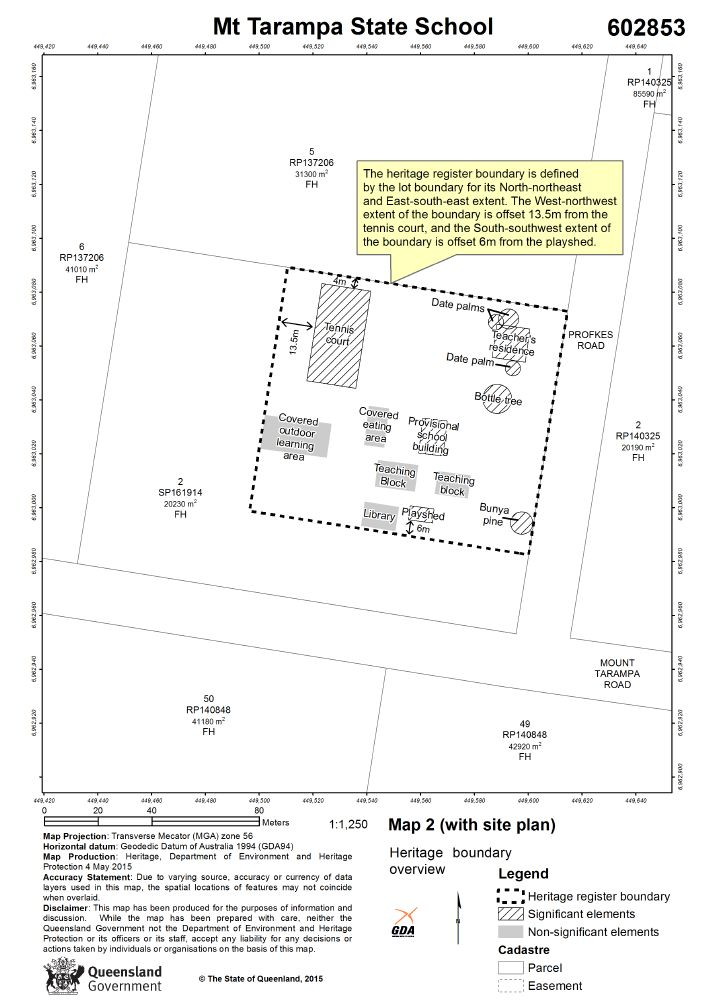
Site map, 2015

Mount Tarampa State School stands on an elevated, approximately 2 hectares (4.9 acres) site on the corner of main thoroughfares, Profkes and Mount Tarampa roads, in Mount Tarampa, approximately 40 kilometres (25 mi) northwest of Ipswich. The school comprises a complex of small buildings, including an early provisional school building (1906, extended 1916), teacher's residence (1918, extended c. 1955), playshed (1912), tennis court (pre-1925) and established trees. The school is conspicuous in its rural setting.

=== Provisional School (1906) ===
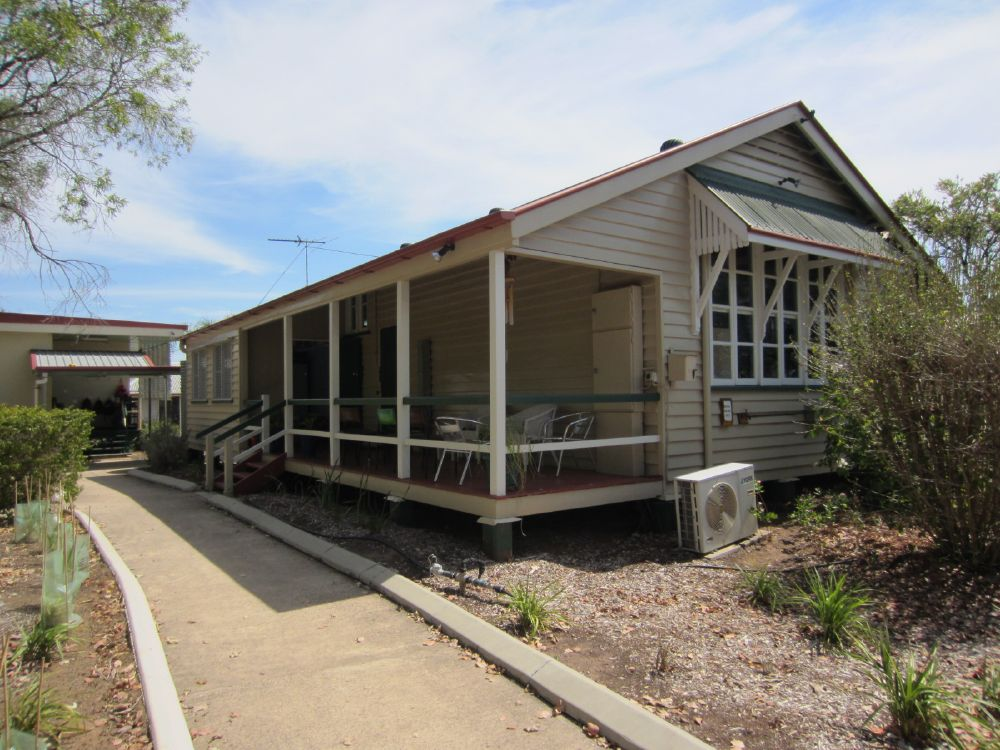
Provisional school building, 2014

Set well back from and facing east to Profkes Road, the early Provisional School building is a small one-storey, lowset, timber-framed structure; axially aligned with the school entrance. The building is clad in timber weatherboards and is sheltered by a gable roof clad with corrugated metal sheets. It has a front and rear verandah and accommodates two rooms. The northern and southern gable ends each retain original tall, timber-framed casement windows sheltered by timber hoods with battened cheeks. Stop-chamfered brackets supporting the centre of each hood are possibly original. Packed weatherboards at the gable end apexes vent the interior.

Both the front (east) and back (west) verandahs are accessed by centrally located timber stairs. The front verandah has exposed roof framing, square timber posts and a timber two-rail balustrade. A join in the fascia identifies the extent of the 1916 northern extension. The southern end of the front verandah is enclosed to form a staff kitchen; and the rear verandah is enclosed for use as staff offices. The front and rear verandah walls retain early timber-framed casement windows with high sills. Access to the interior is via original braced and ledged board doors (not in their original locations).

Originally one large classroom, the interior is divided into two rooms separated by a central hallway of part-height modern partitions. The interior walls and coved ceilings are lined with v-jointed timber boards. A continuous break in the ceiling boards over the central hallway delineates where the 1916 extension was attached. Timber tie beams are exposed within the spaces and timber lattice ceiling vents are in the northern and southern rooms.

=== Teacher's Residence (1918) ===
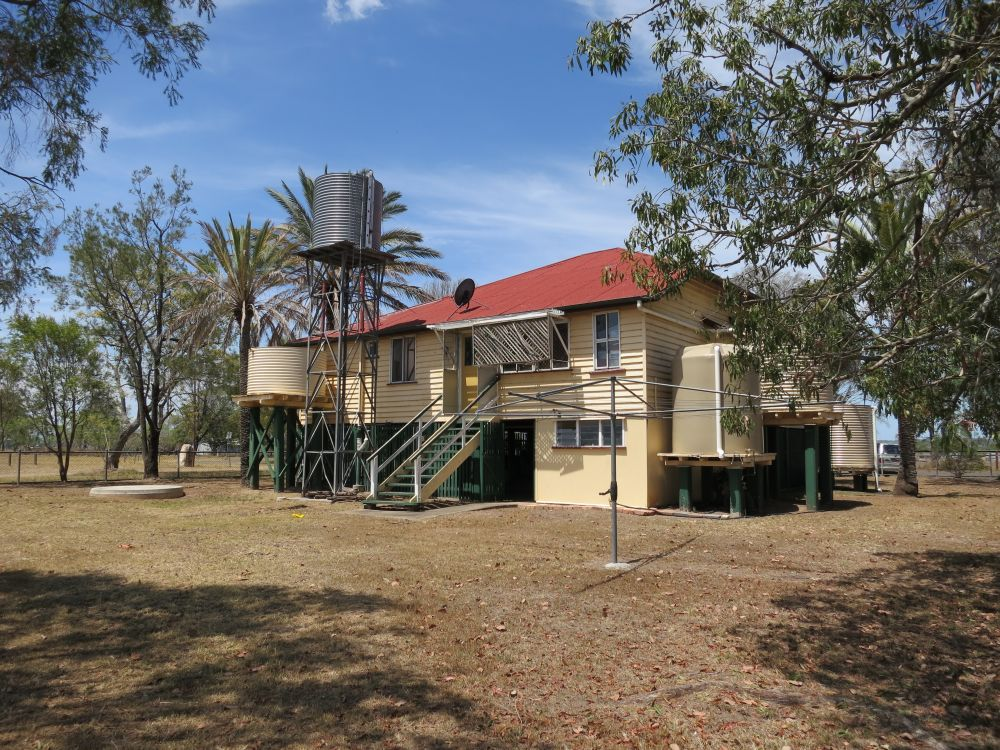
Teacher's residence (rear view), 2014

The teacher's residence is a highset timber-framed, weatherboard-clad building that stands on concrete stumps and is protected by a corrugated metal-clad hipped roof. The building addresses Profkes Road to the east, with bedrooms and living rooms along the north and east sides, and a kitchen with projecting stove alcove at the southwest corner. The interior is accessed via central front (east) and rear (west) timber stairs that lead to verandahs. The front verandah has timber posts and a two-rail battened balustrade, and the rear verandah has been enclosed with weatherboards to form a living space. The c. 1955 extension on the north side comprises a living space with a bathroom in the northwest corner. Verandah walls are single-skin, lined with v-jointed tongue-and-groove boards. The building has a variety of timber-framed windows, including original double-hung windows-those on the southern elevation are sheltered by original timber-framed hoods with battened cheeks. The understorey has timber batten screens fixed between concrete stumps; the southwest corner has been enclosed to form a utility room.

The internal layout of the residence is highly intact, comprising a central corridor running east–west between the entrance doors, with two rooms to either side. The front two rooms are bedrooms, and a bedroom and kitchen are at the rear. The kitchen has a stove recess and pantry. Internal walls are single skin with exposed studwork, and most walls are lined with v-jointed tongue-and-groove boards. Ceilings are lined in flat sheeting, and modern carpet and linoleum line the floors. Skirting, cornices and architraves are narrow with simple profiles. Retaining early hardware, internal doors are low-waisted with two-light fanlights, and doors to the northern extension are half-glazed, six-light French doors, with single-light centre-pivoting fanlights. The bathroom, toilet and kitchen fitouts are not of cultural heritage significance.

=== Playshed (1912) ===
The playshed is located to the south of the Provisional School building. It is a 6-post, timber-framed shelter with braced posts and a hipped roof clad with corrugated metal sheets. The formerly open-sided structure has been enclosed with modern part-height corrugated metal sheets. It has a concrete floor and a ceiling of flat sheet material has been inserted. Timber brackets are internally attached to the southwestern posts for storage of a wooden trestle table. Modern window and door openings are not of cultural heritage significance.

=== Grounds ===
The grounds of Mount Tarampa State School are well established and include mature trees. These include: three well-established date palms (Phoenix dactylifera) within the teacher's residence yard; a large bottle tree (Brachychiton rupestris) adjacent to the fence-line separating the school and residence; a mature bunya pine (Araucaria bidwillii) at the front of the school near Profkes Road; and other established trees lining the boundary of the site. A tennis court, located northwest of the provisional school building, has a modern surface and is surrounded by high chain wire fencing.

== Heritage listing ==
Mount Tarampa State School was listed on the Queensland Heritage Register on 1 May 2015 having satisfied the following criteria.

The place is important in demonstrating the evolution or pattern of Queensland's history.

Mount Tarampa State School (established in 1906 as Mount Tarampa Provisional School) is important in demonstrating the evolution of state education and its associated architecture in Queensland. It retains representative examples of standard government designs that were architectural responses to prevailing government educational philosophies. These are a Department of Public Works-designed provisional school building (1906), a playshed (1912), and a teacher's residence (1918) set within school grounds with significant landscape elements including mature plantings and a tennis court.

The place is important in demonstrating the principal characteristics of a particular class of cultural places.

Mount Tarampa State School is important in demonstrating the principal characteristics of Queensland state school complex, comprising buildings constructed to standard designs by the Department of Public Works, located on a large landscaped site with mature trees and a tennis court. The school is a good example of a modest, regional school with its small, simple teaching building that has been modified over time.

The Department of Public Works designed provisional school building (1906, extended 1916) is an excellent, intact example of its type that retains its lowset form with front and rear verandahs (now partly enclosed), timber-framed and -clad construction, gable roof, coved ceiling, early doors and windows, and natural lighting and ventilation features.

The playshed (1912) has a hipped timber-framed roof supported on braced, timber posts (all sides are now enclosed).

The teacher's residence (1918) is an excellent, intact example of the residence type of its period – a highset timber-framed and clad building with hipped roof, comprising three bedrooms, a kitchen with stove alcove, and front and rear verandahs (rear verandah is now enclosed).

The place has a strong or special association with a particular community or cultural group for social, cultural or spiritual reasons.

Schools have always played an important part in Queensland communities. They typically retain significant and enduring connections with former pupils, parents, and teachers; provide a venue for social interaction and volunteer work; and are a source of pride, symbolising local progress and aspirations.

Mount Tarampa State School has a strong and ongoing association with the Mount Tarampa community. Operating since 1906 generations of Mount Tarampa children have been taught there. The place is important for its contribution to the educational development of Mount Tarampa and is a prominent community focal point and gathering place for social events with widespread community support.

== See also ==
- History of state education in Queensland
- List of schools in West Moreton
