= Regency Downs, Queensland =

Regency Downs
- Suburb
- Interactive map of Regency Downs
- Coordinates: 27.5325°S 152.4394°E
- Country: Australia
- State: Queensland
- LGA: Lockyer Valley Region
- Location: 14.9 km (9.3 mi) NNE of Laidley; 20.1 km (12.5 mi) E of Gatton; 40.1 km (24.9 mi) WNW of Ipswich; 54.6 km (33.9 mi) E of Toowoomba; 77.5 km (48.2 mi) W of Brisbane

Government
  - State electorate: Lockyer
  - Federal division: Wright

Area
  - Total: 15.2 km^{2} (5.9 sq mi)

Population
  - Total: 2,623 (2021 census)
  - Density: 172.6/km^{2} (446.9/sq mi)
- Time zone: UTC+10:00 (AEST)
- Postcode: 4341
Suburbs around Regency Downs
Glenore Grove	Lockrose	Brightview
Glenore Grove	Regency Downs	Kensington Grove
Plainland	Hatton Vale	Hatton Vale

Regency Downs is a mixed-use locality in the Lockyer Valley Region, Queensland, Australia. In the 2021 census, Regency Downs had a population of 2,623 people, an increase of 12% from the 2016 census (2,306 people).

== Geography ==
Regency Downs is located in the Lockyer Valley and is immediately north of the Warrego Highway and Plainland and east of Glenore Grove.

It is approximately 75 kilometres from Brisbane and 55 kilometres from Toowoomba.

The Lockyer Valley Regional Council is the local government authority for Regency Downs.

Historically a rural area, it has increasingly been subdivised into rural residential house sites reducing the agriculture in the locality. The predominant land use is housing with the remainder of the land used for grazing on native vegetation.

== History ==
The locality was named and bounded on 3 June 1994 and amended on 26 May 2000. The district was re-gazetted on 29 August 2008 due to local council amalgamations under the Local Government Reform Implementation Act 2007.

== Demographics ==
The population of Regency Downs has consistently grown from 2006 to 2021.

Population of Regency Downs
Census	Population	Note
2006 census	1,705	
2011 census	2,097	
2016 census	2,306	
2021 census	2,623	

== Education ==
There are no schools in Regency Downs. The nearest government primary schools are:

- Glenore Grove State School in neighbouring Glenore Grove to the west
- Lockrose State School in neighbouring Lockrose to the north
- Hatton Vale State School in neighbouring Hatton Vale to the south

The nearest government secondary schools are Laidley State High School in Laidley to the south and Lockyer District State High School in Gatton to the west.
