= Brightview =

Brightview could refer to:

- Brightview, Alberta, a locality in Canada
- Brightview Group, former United Kingdom Internet Service Provider group
- BrightView LCD Screen, glossy display laptop screen by HP/Compaq
- Brightview, Queensland, a locality in Australia
