= Kensington Grove, Queensland =

Kensington Grove
- Suburb
- Interactive map of Kensington Grove
- Coordinates: 27.5319°S 152.4716°E
- Country: Australia
- State: Queensland
- LGA: Lockyer Valley Region
- Location: 116.8 km (72.6 mi) SW of Lowood; 17.0 km (10.6 mi) NE of Laidley; 24.2 km (15.0 mi) E of Gatton; 59.3 km (36.8 mi) E of Toowoomba; 72.5 km (45.0 mi) WSW of Brisbane

Government
  - State electorate: Lockyer
  - Federal division: Wright

Area
  - Total: 10.9 km^{2} (4.2 sq mi)

Population
  - Total: 2,050 (2021 census)
  - Density: 188.1/km^{2} (487/sq mi)
- Postcode: 4341
Suburbs around Kensington Grove
Brightview	Brightview	Brightview
Regency Downs	Kensington Grove	Prenzlau
Hatton Vale	Hatton Vale	Hatton Vale

Kensington Grove is a rural residential locality in the Lockyer Valley Region, Queensland, Australia. In the 2021 census, Kensington Grove had a population of 2,050 people.

== Geography ==
The land use is predominantly rural residential with some grazing on native vegetation in the east and north-west of the locality.

== History ==
A war memorial was unveiled on Wednesday 8 November 1995, commemorating the 50th anniversary of the end of World War II by remembering thel residents of Laidley Shire who served in Australia and overseas during the war. It is located in the Memorial Park on Thallon Road (27.54116°S 152.46467°E).

== Demographics ==
In the 2016 census, Kensington Grove had a population of 1,717 people.

In the 2021 census, Kensington Grove had a population of 2,050 people.

== Education ==
There are no schools in Kensington Grove. The nearest government primary school is Hatton Vale State School in neighbouring Hatton Vale to the south. The nearest government secondary schools are Lowood State High School in Lowood to the north-east and Laidley State High School in Laidley to the south-west.

== Amenities ==
There are a number of parks in the area:

- Kensington Grove Park (27.5304°S 152.4535°E)
- Memorial Park (27.5412°S 152.4646°E)
