= Coolana, Queensland =

Coolana
- Suburb
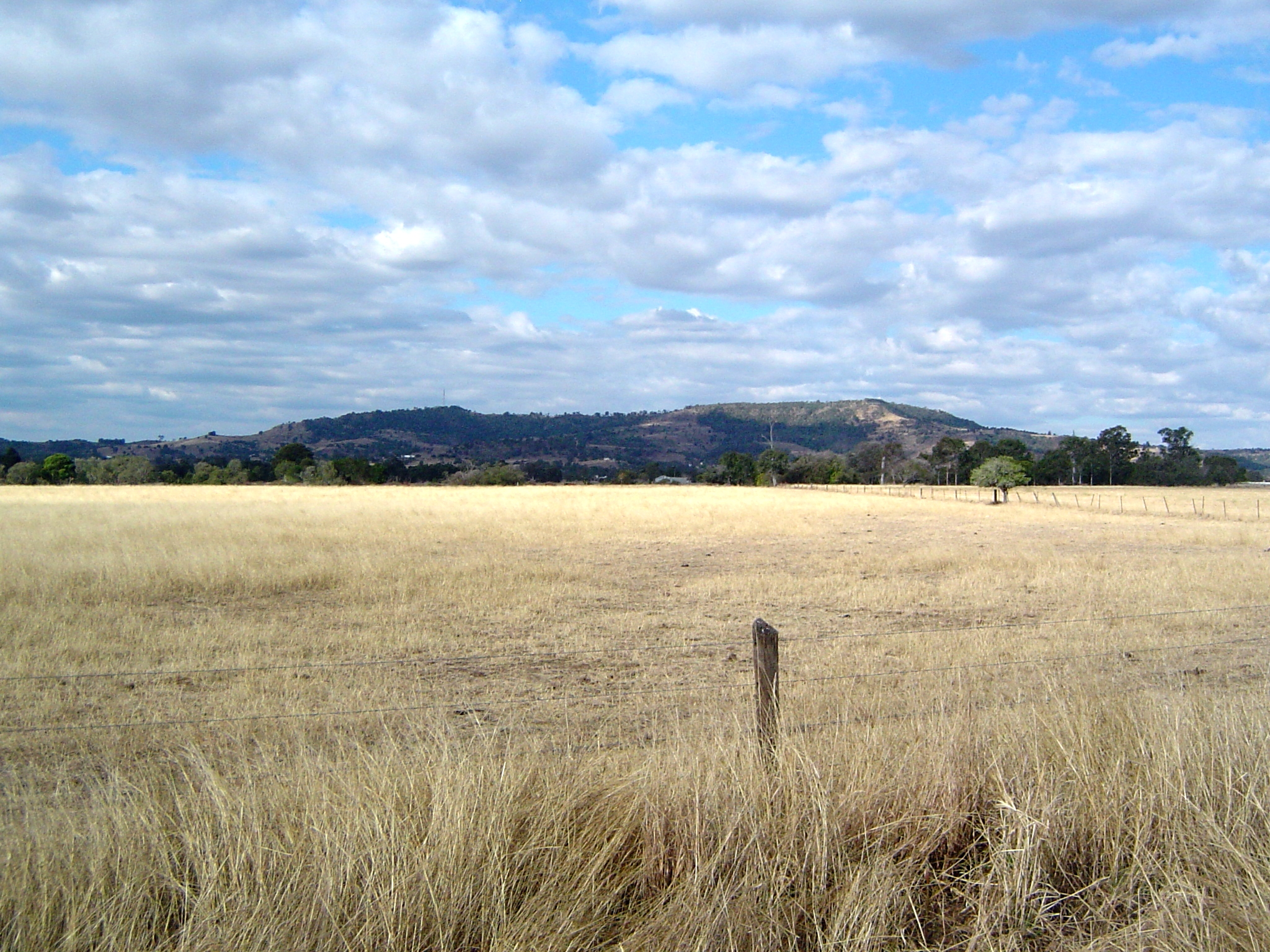
- Mount Stradbroke and paddocks along Rassmussan Road, 2014

- Interactive map of Coolana
- Coordinates: 27.5152°S 152.5511°E
- Country: Australia
- State: Queensland
- City: Somerset Region
- LGA: Somerset Region
- Location: 8.7 km (5.4 mi) SW of Lowood; 30.3 km (18.8 mi) WNW of Ipswich; 45.5 km (28.3 mi) SSE of Esk; 66.7 km (41.4 mi) W of Brisbane

Government
  - State electorate: Lockyer
  - Federal division: Dickson

Area
  - Total: 9.6 km^{2} (3.7 sq mi)

Population
  - Total: 175 (2021 census)
  - Density: 18.23/km^{2} (47.2/sq mi)
- Time zone: UTC+10:00 (AEST)
- Postcode: 4311
Suburbs around Coolana
Brightview	Tarampa	Glamorgan Vale
Prenzlau	Coolana	Lark Hill
Prenzlau	Minden	Marburg

Coolana is a rural locality in the Somerset Region, Queensland, Australia. In the 2021 census, Coolana had a population of 175 people.

== Geography ==
Coolana lies in the west of the Lockyer Creek catchment area. Part of the northern boundary of Coolana follows Plain Creek, a tributary of Lockyer Creek. The east of the suburb rises towards the peak of Mount Stradbroke. Lowood Minden Road traverses the locality from north to south. Parts of the area are used for agriculture while much of the land remains undeveloped.

== History ==
The area was originally known as Hillside. It was renamed by 1918.

== Demographics ==
Coolana has a stable population. In the 2011 census, it recorded a population of 174. In the 2016 census, 178 people. In the 2021 census, 175 people.

== Education ==
There are no schools in Coolana. The nearest government primary schools are Tarampa State School in neighbouring Tarampa to the north, Minden State School in neighbouring Minden to the south, and Prenzlau State School in neighbouring Prenzlau to the south-west. The nearest government secondary school is Lowood State High School in Lowood to the north.
