= Lockrose =

- Suburb
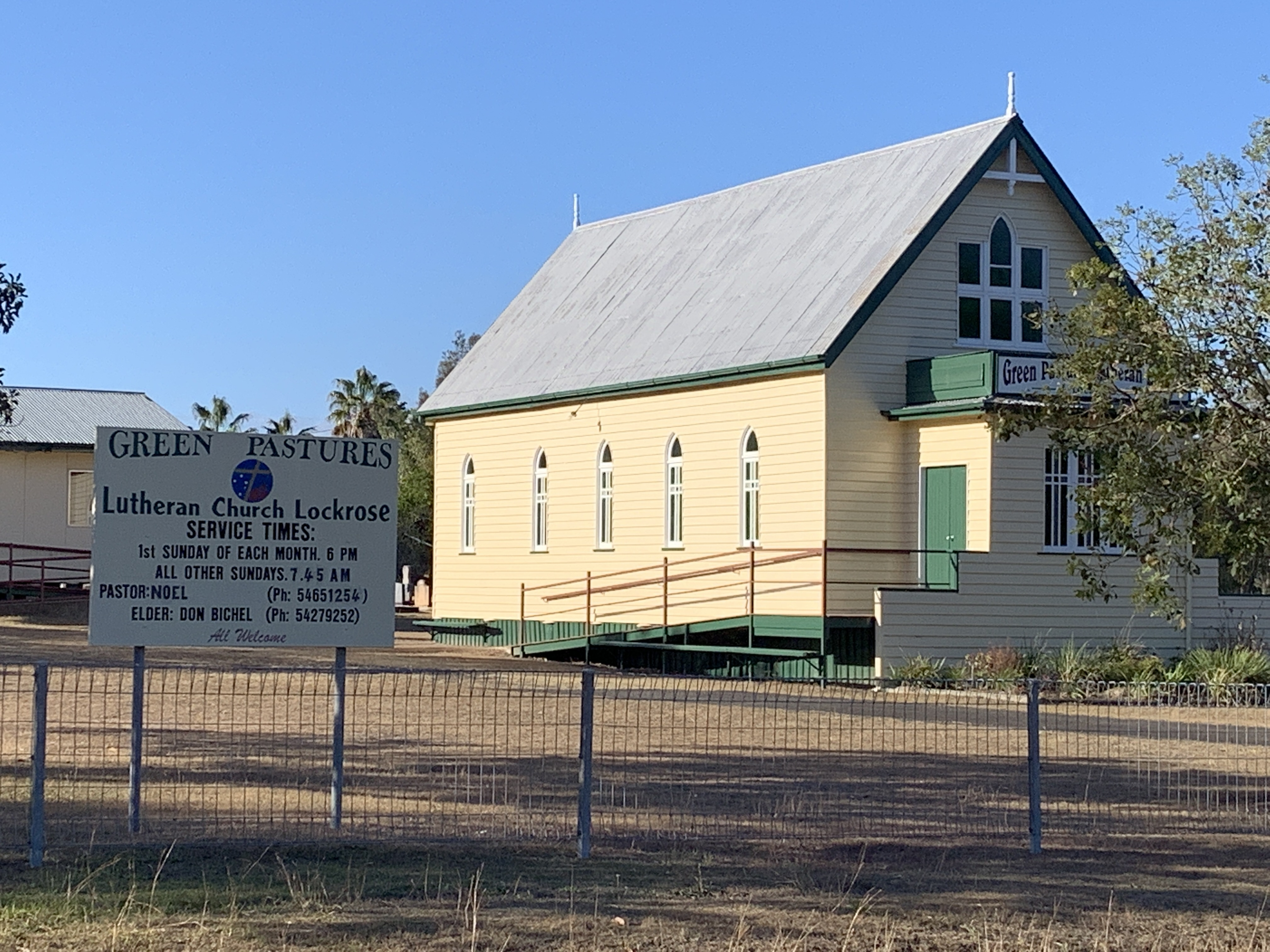
- Green Pastures Lutheran Church, 2019

- Interactive map of Lockrose
- Coordinates: 27.4937°S 152.4606°E
- Country: Australia
- State: Queensland
- LGAs: Lockyer Valley Region; Somerset Region
- Location: 14.4 km (8.9 mi) WSW of Lowood; 23.5 km (14.6 mi) ENE of Gatton; 38.6 km (24.0 mi) S of Esk; 43.9 km (27.3 mi) NW of Ipswich; 81.4 km (50.6 mi) W of Brisbane

Government
  - State electorate: Lockyer
  - Federal division: Blair

Area
  - Total: 15.7 km^{2} (6.1 sq mi)

Population
  - Total: 564 (2021 census)
  - Density: 35.92/km^{2} (93.0/sq mi)
- Time zone: UTC+10:00 (AEST)
- Postcode: 4342
Suburbs around Lockrose
Kentville	Lynford	Mount Tarampa
Glenore Grove	Lockrose	Brightview
Regency Downs	Regency Downs	Brightview

Lockrose is a rural locality split between the Lockyer Valley Region and Somerset Region of Queensland, Australia. In the 2021 census, Lockrose had a population of 564 people.

== Geography ==
Lockrose is in South East Queensland. The northern boundary of Lockrose is marked by Lockyer Creek and the southern boundary by Brightview Road.

Although not officially gazetted as a town, there is an established urban area in the centre of the locality where the school, church and other amenities are located and surrounded by housing. There is a second pocket of rural residential development in the south of the locality.

Areas along the creek have been intensely farmed with irrigated crops with other rural land used for grazing on native vegetation.

== Demographics ==
In the 2011 census, Lockrose had a population of 553 people.

In the 2016 census, Lockrose had a population of 562 people.

In the 2021 census, Lockrose had a population of 564 people.

The census data includes the population of neighbouring Lynford which is not separately reported.
