= Prenzlau, Queensland =

Prenzlau
- Suburb
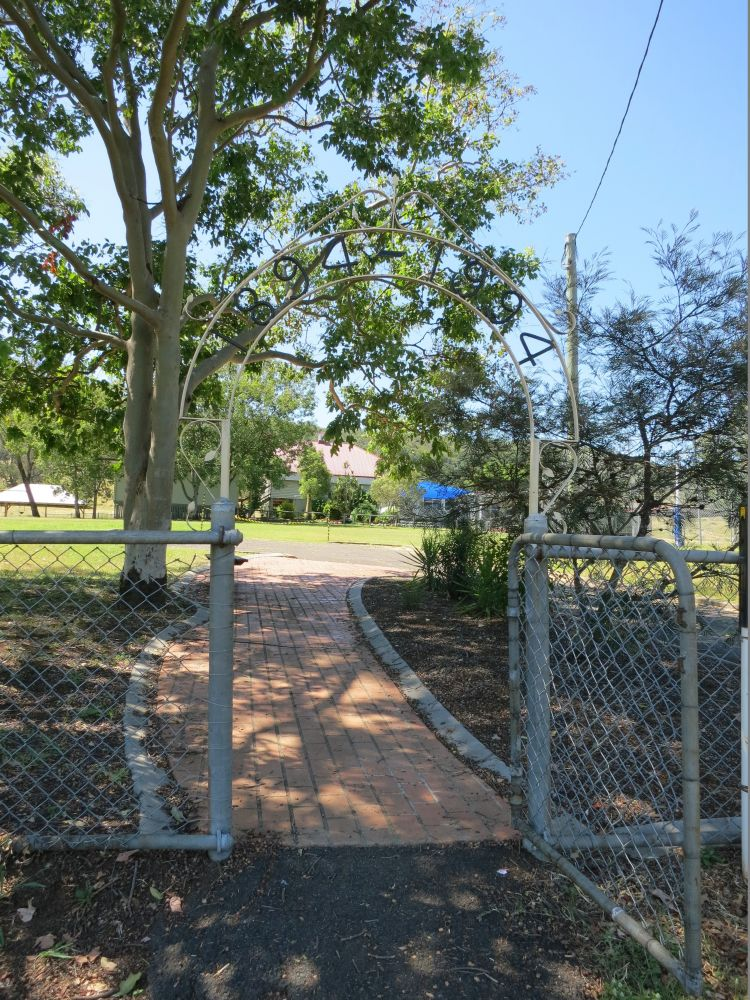
- Entrance gate to Prenzlau State School, 2015

- Interactive map of Prenzlau
- Coordinates: 27.5319°S 152.5177°E
- Country: Australia
- State: Queensland
- LGA: Somerset Region
- Location: 15.1 km (9.4 mi) SE of Loowood; 20.0 km (12.4 mi) NE of Laidley; 31.2 km (19.4 mi) WNW of Ipswich; 51.9 km (32.2 mi) S of Esk; 67.7 km (42.1 mi) W of Brisbane
- Established: 1860s

Government
  - State electorate: Scenic Rim
  - Federal division: Blair

Area
  - Total: 17.6 km^{2} (6.8 sq mi)

Population
  - Total: 408 (2021 census)
  - Density: 23.18/km^{2} (60.04/sq mi)
- Time zone: UTC+10:00 (AEST)
- Postcode: 4311
Suburbs around Prenzlau
Brightview	Brightview	Coolana
Kensington Grove	Prenzlau	Minden
Hatton Vale	Hatton Vale	Minden

Prenzlau is a rural locality in the Somerset Region, Queensland, Australia. In the 2021 census, Prenzlau had a population of 408 people.

== Geography ==
Prenzlau is situated in the Lockyer Valley at the southern end of the Somerset Region LGA in southeastern Queensland, Australia.

== History ==
The area was settled in the 1860s by German immigrants, including the Ruthenberg and Ruhl families, from the Uckermark near Prenzlau in Brandenburg, Germany. The locality name is presumed to have been taken from the German town.

Prenzlau Provisional School opened on 21 October 1894. On 1 May 1900, it became Prenzlau State School.

There was a post office in the town from 1894 to 1968.

== Demographics ==
In the 2006 census, Prenzlau had a population of 1,120 people.

In the 2016 census, Prenzlau had a population of 427 people.

In the 2021 census, Prenzlau had a population of 408 people.

== Education ==
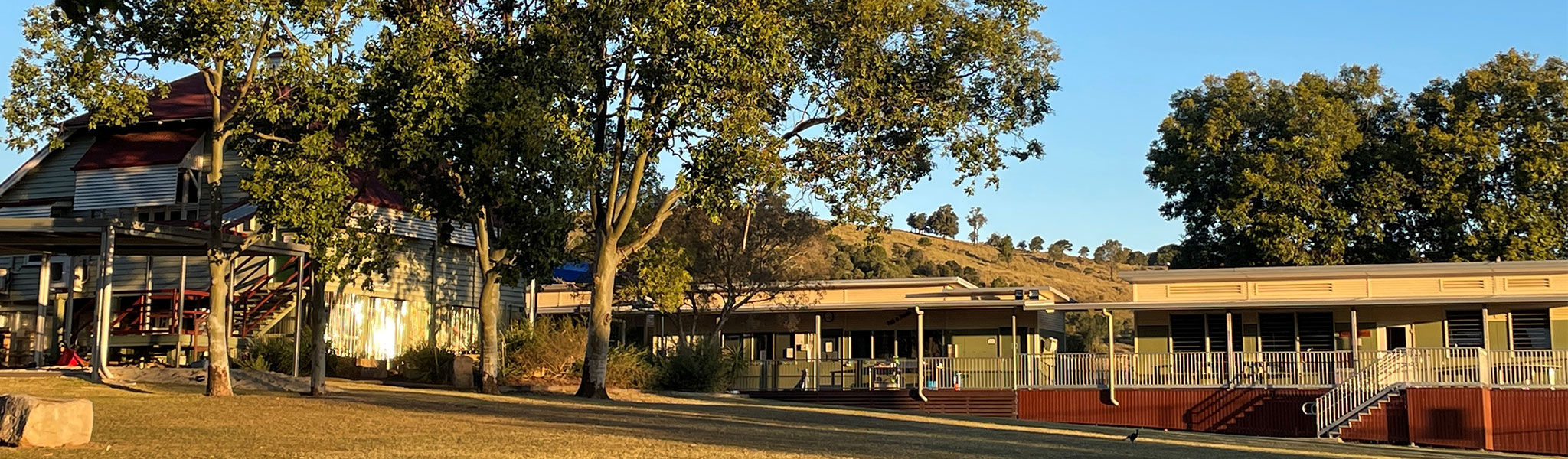
Prenzlau State School, 2025

Prenzlau State School is a government primary (Prep–6) school for boys and girls at 357 Prenzlau Road (27.5340°S 152.5232°E). In 2017, the school had an enrolment of 56 students with 4 teachers and 5 non-teaching staff (3 full-time equivalent).

There are no secondary schools in Prenzlau. The nearest government secondary schools are Lowood State High School in Lowood to the north-east and Laidley State High School in Laidley to the south-west.

== Heritage listings ==
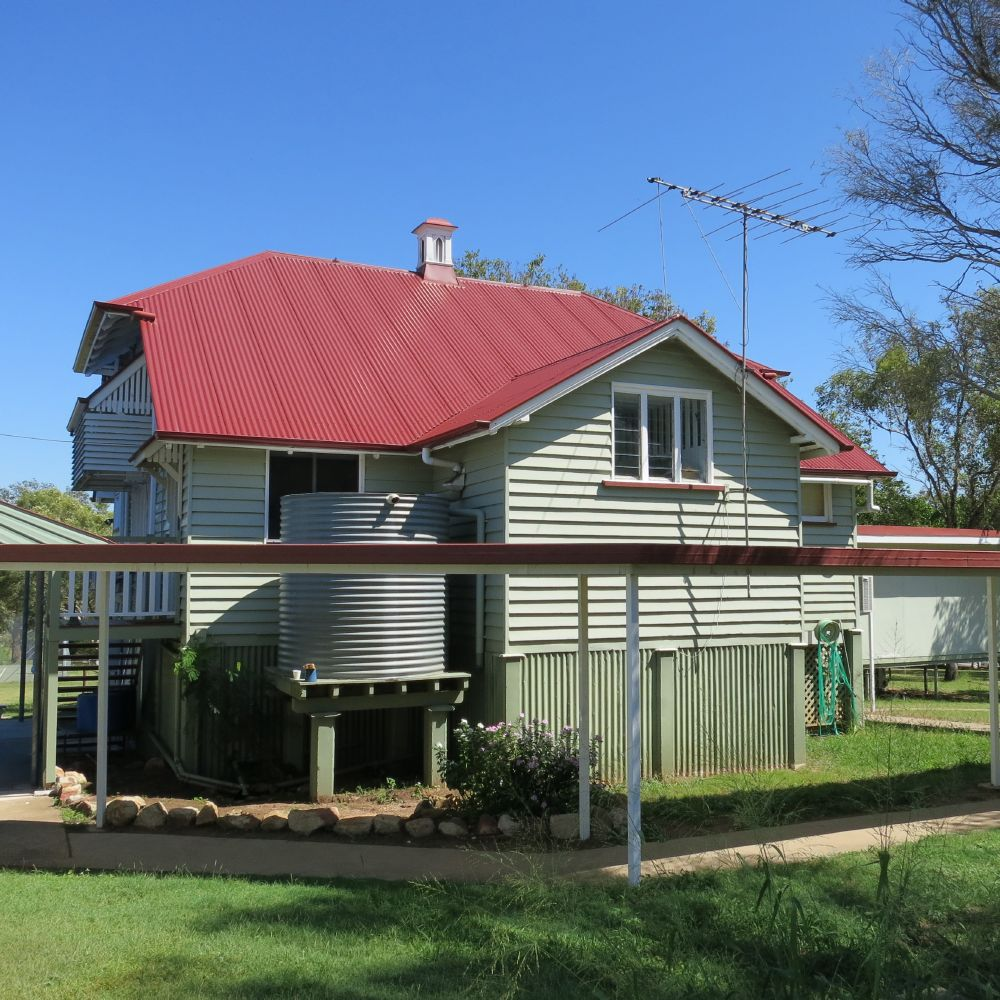
Heritage-listed building, Prenzlau State School, east elevation, 2015

Heritage-listed sites in Prenzlau include:

- 357 Prenzlau Road: Prenzlau State School
