= Prenzlau State School =

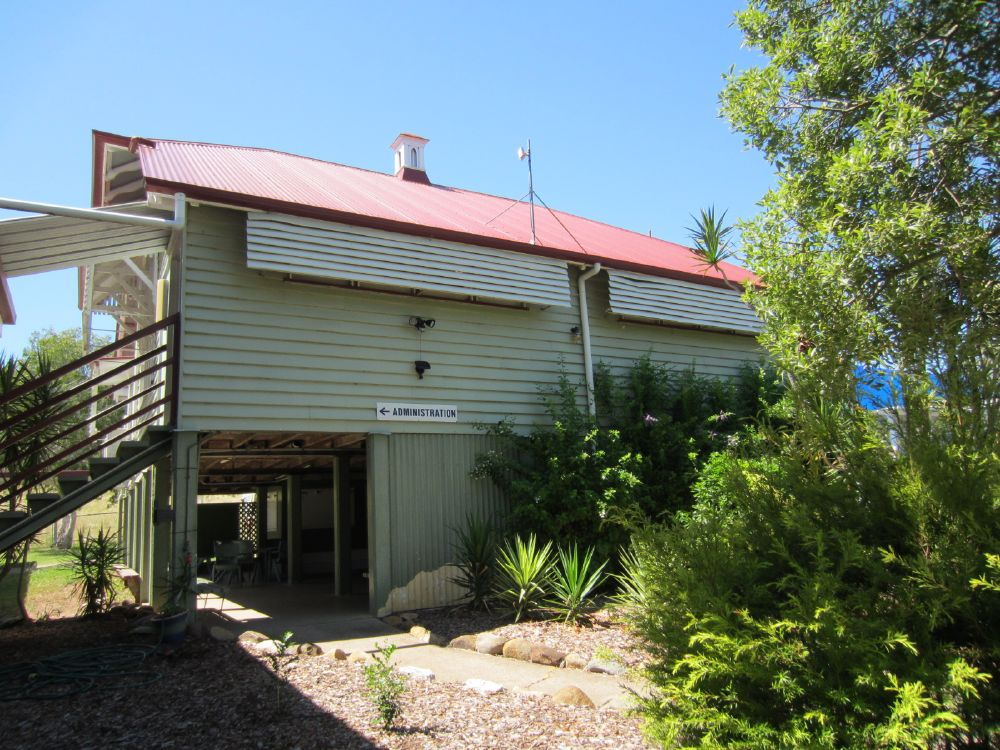
- West elevation of 1900 teaching building, 2015

- Location within Queensland
- 27.5340°S 152.5237°E
- Location: 357 Prenzlau Road, Prenzlau, Somerset Region, Queensland, Australia

History
- Built: 1899–1900, 1910

Site notes
- Architect: Queensland Department of Public Works

Queensland Heritage Register
- Official name: Prenzlau State School
- Type: state heritage
- Designated: 12 June 2015
- Reference no.: 602856
- Type: Education, research, scientific facility: School-state
- Theme: Educating Queenslanders: Providing primary schooling
- Builders: C Ridsdale, Charles Wilson

Prenzlau State School is a heritage-listed state school at 357 Prenzlau Road, Prenzlau, Somerset Region, Queensland, Australia. It was designed by Queensland Department of Public Works and built from 1899 to 1900 by C Ridsdale and Charles Wilson. It was added to the Queensland Heritage Register on 12 June 2015.

== History ==
Prenzlau State School opened in 1894 as a provisional school on a 0.71 hectares (1.8 acres) site within the small agricultural settlement of Prenzlau in the Lockyer Valley, to serve the sparse but growing rural population. As settlement increased, the provisional school building was replaced by a Department of Public Works-designed teaching building (1900) after the school was designated as a state school in 1899 and a playshed was added in 1910. In 1923 the school was moved to its current site. An honour board in the teaching building commemorates those from the district who served during World War II. The school has been in continuous operation since establishment and has been a focus for the local community as a place for important social and cultural activity.

Traditionally the land of the Jagera people, European occupation of the Lockyer Valley for pastoral purposes began in the 1840s. Prenzlau's establishment, as Back Plains, dates from the 1870s, when the area was settled by German immigrants from the Uckermark near Prenzlau in Brandenburg, Germany. The name Prenzlau replaced Back Plains in the 1890s.

Prenzlau Provisional School opened after its school committee formed and fulfilled the requirements for the opening of a provisional school. Tenders for its construction were called in 1893 and the school opened on 24 January 1894. The school was located on a hilly, north-facing site surrounded by farmland.

The provision of state-administered education was important to the colonial governments of Australia. Following the introduction of Queensland's Education Act 1860, which established the Board of General Education and began standardising curriculum, training and facilities, Queensland's schools grew rapidly. The State Education Act 1875 provided for free, compulsory and secular primary education and the establishment of the Department of Public Instruction. This further standardised the provision of education, and despite difficulties, achieved the remarkable feat of bringing basic literacy to most Queensland children by 1900.

The establishment of schools was considered an essential step in the development of early communities and integral to their success. Locals often donated land and labour for a school's construction and the school community contributed to maintenance and development. Schools became a community focus, a symbol of progress, and a source of pride, with enduring connections formed with past pupils, parents, and teachers. The inclusion of war memorials and community halls reinforced these connections and provided a venue for a wide range of community events in schools across Queensland.

Due to increased enrolments, Prenzlau Provisional School upgraded to a state school in 1899. Tenders were called for constructing a new teaching building and converting the provisional school building into a teacher's residence. The estimated cost was £590, of which the School Committee was required to raise £118.

To help ensure consistency and economy, the Queensland Government developed standard plans for its school buildings. From the 1860s until the 1960s, Queensland school buildings were predominantly timber-framed, an easy and cost-effective approach that also enabled the government to provide facilities in remote areas. Standard designs were continually refined in response to changing needs and educational philosophy and Queensland school buildings were particularly innovative in climate control, lighting, and ventilation. Standardisation produced distinctly similar schools across Queensland with complexes of typical components.

The new building at Prenzlau State School was built to a standard Department of Public Works design (C/T1) by Charles Wilson for £618 and was ready for use in March 1900. Prenzlau State School is characteristic of one of the department's early timber school designs. It was a lowset, timber-framed and clad building containing a single classroom, with verandahs front and back and an enclosed annexe attached to the rear verandah, used as a hat room and lavatory. The classroom was vented by a roof ventilator in the centre of the hipped roof and square, latticed panels in the coved ceiling. The interior was lit by windows in the verandah walls and banks of high windows in the end walls.

The Queensland education system recognised the importance of play in the school curriculum and, as school sites were typically cleared of all vegetation, the provision of all-weather outdoor space was needed. Playsheds were designed as free-standing shelters, with fixed timber seating between posts and earth or decomposed granite floors that provided covered play space and doubled as teaching space when required These structures were timber-framed and generally open sided, although some were partially enclosed with timber boards or corrugated galvanised iron sheets. The hipped (or less frequently, gabled) roofs were clad with timber shingles or corrugated iron. Playsheds were a typical addition to state schools across Queensland between c. 1880s and the 1950s, although less frequently constructed after c. 1909, with the introduction of highset school buildings with understorey play areas. Built to standard designs, playsheds ranged in size relative to student numbers. In 1910, a six-post timber playshed with a hipped roof was built at Prenzlau State School by C Ridsdale of Rosewood for £36.10s. Pupil numbers in this period averaged more than 50 per day. The playshed was a characteristic example of a six-post type, with light timber framing.

Development of the Prenzlau area was steady. The Queensland Post Office Directory in 1911 recorded 27 farmers at Prenzlau and the census recorded a population of 55. Between 1906 and 1913, the Back Plains Dairy Company and the Hillside Cooperative Cattle Dip Company Limited operated in the area.

In 1921, after several years of lobbying by the school committee about the unsuitability of the school's hilly site, and despite declining pupil numbers, the Department of Public Instruction, through the Lands Department, resumed land for a new school reserve. The owner, Mr Ruhl, was paid £30 as compensation.

Subsequently, in 1923, the school building and playshed were moved to the new site about 300 metres (980 ft) to the northeast for £367. The removal of the buildings was completed in July 1923 and the school re-opened on 9 July 1923. A photograph of the opening shows the existing school building, now highset on timber stumps, with its roof ventilator, weatherboard walls, dowel balustrade and lattice corner panels. The Department of Public Works had greatly improved the natural ventilation and lighting of classroom interiors over time, experimenting with different combinations of roof ventilators, ceiling and wall vents, larger windows, dormer windows and ducting. Achieving an ideal or even adequate level of natural light in classrooms, without glare, was of critical importance to educators and consequently it became central to the design and layout of all school buildings. Existing lowset teaching buildings, like at Prenzlau State School, were raised for increased ventilation with the added benefit of providing a covered play space in the understorey. Reflecting these changes in education standards and philosophy, the key modifications to the Prenzlau teaching building on its new site included elevating it to become highset, lining the interior walls and enlarging the area of windows in the end walls.

Repairs and improvements to the school took place periodically. In July 1927, the Education Department authorised repairs to the school and teacher's residence - undertaken by Messrs Profke and Hohnke of Marburg. Prenzlau School Committee formed a working-bee on 5 October 1937 "to level off and put down an ant-bed cricket pitch in the school ground". The following month another "working bee to level the ground under the school and make drains to divert the water that usually runs there" occurred. Meanwhile, in October 1937, August Luther of Coolana, was the successful tender for "walling-in of the basement of the Prenzlau State School building and the draining of the tank overflows".

World War II affected many schools. Typically, they were a focus for civilian duty during wartime, and Prenzlau State School was no different - acting as a Ration Book Issuing Centre in June 1942. The Golden Jubilee of the school's opening was celebrated in a low-key manner in 1944.

The immediate post-World War II years were a time for improvements. Estimates for the erection of a tennis court of £40–50 were received in 1946, but it was not until a working bee in April 1951 that the tennis court was completed. Meanwhile, on 31 July 1948, an honour board with the names of those from the district who served in WWII was unveiled. Constructed by Frank Olkers of Lowood, the honour board was erected by the School Committee and funded by Prenzlau Progress Association. A report of the unveiling event stated that all those listed on the board were past scholars of the Prenzlau School. In 1949 the exterior of the school was painted. Electricity was connected to the school in September 1952. The roof was replaced after cyclonic winds unroofed the school in June 1954; and the northern portion of the east verandah was enclosed to house a library in 1959. In this year also, a new teacher's residence was built (removed post-2005) and the old residence demolished. In 1962 at a cost of £40, alterations to the school included resurfacing of the tennis court.

The provision of outdoor play space was a result of the early and continuing commitment to play-based education, particularly in primary school. Trees and gardens were planted as part of the beautification of schools. In the 1870s, schools inspector William Boyd was critical of tropical schools and amongst his recommendations stressed the importance of the adding shade trees to playgrounds. In addition, Arbor Day celebrations began in Queensland in 1890. Landscape elements were often constructed to standard designs and were intrinsic to Queensland Government education philosophies. Educators believed gardening and Arbor Days instilled in young minds the value of hard work and activity, improved classroom discipline, developed aesthetic tastes, and inspired people to stay on the land. Aesthetically designed gardens were encouraged by regional inspectors.

Prenzlau State School's grounds retain a number of mature trees of significance. Arbor Day was celebrated at the school until at least 1961. Plantings included 'an "Anzac" tree to 'commemorate the gallantry of our Gallipoli heroes' at the former school site. In February 1924 the head teacher planted several native trees, mainly crow's ash (Flindersia australis) in the new school grounds; and in October of the same year, a tree planting ceremony was held for Arbor Day. In 1934, a leopard tree (Flindersia maculosa), presented by the Head Teacher of Tarampa State School, from that school's forestry plot, was planted in honour of the late Squadron-Leader Bert Hinkler. Two coral trees, a Queensland nut (macadamia) and a Leopard tree were planted by members of the school committee at a Jubilee Arbor Day in May 1951; two mango trees, one leopard tree and one macadamia tree were planted in the following year; and in 1953, two pines and a jacaranda were planted. Remaining on site in 2015 are two crow's ash (Flindersia australis) to the west of the playshed, which date from pre-1944; the row of crow's ash and a she-oak (Casuarinacece) along the southern extent of the western boundary; and one leopard tree (Flindersia maculosa) near the southwestern corner of the school grounds. The two jacaranda trees (Jacaranda mimosifolia) onsite appear to have been in-situ by 1959. There are other mature shade trees on the site, which cannot be dated from the historical records.

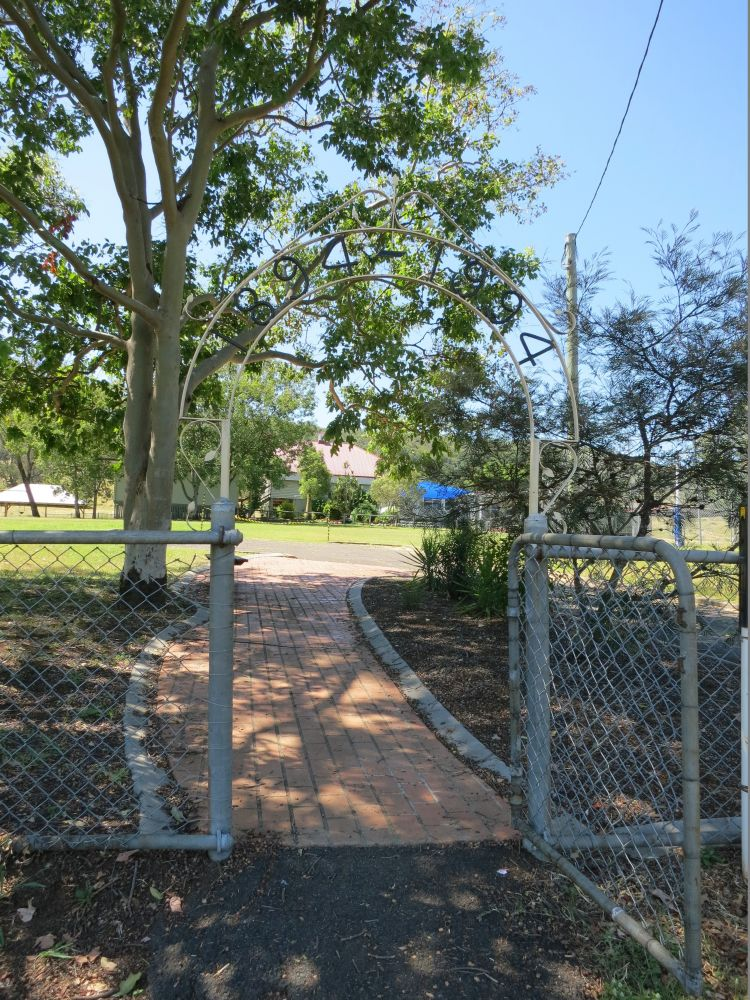
Entrance gate, 2015

The school grounds retain remnants of a forestry plot, established between 1970 and 1982, planted in the northeast corner of the school grounds. Seventeen hoop pines (Araucaria cunninghamii) remain.

In 1973, the school committee was asked to show cause why the school should not be closed because there were only 9 pupils enrolled. A deputation to the Education Department argued that within a few years the number of primary school children in the district would markedly increase. The decision to close the school was postponed.

Centenary celebrations in 1994 included a centenary publication and entrance gates.

In 2015, the school continues to operate from its 1923 site. It retains the Department of Public Works teaching building, the playshed and mature shade trees. The school is important to the area, having been a focus for the community, and generations of Prenzlau students have been taught there. Since establishment it has been a key social focus for the Prenzlau community with the grounds and building having been the location of many social events.

== Description ==
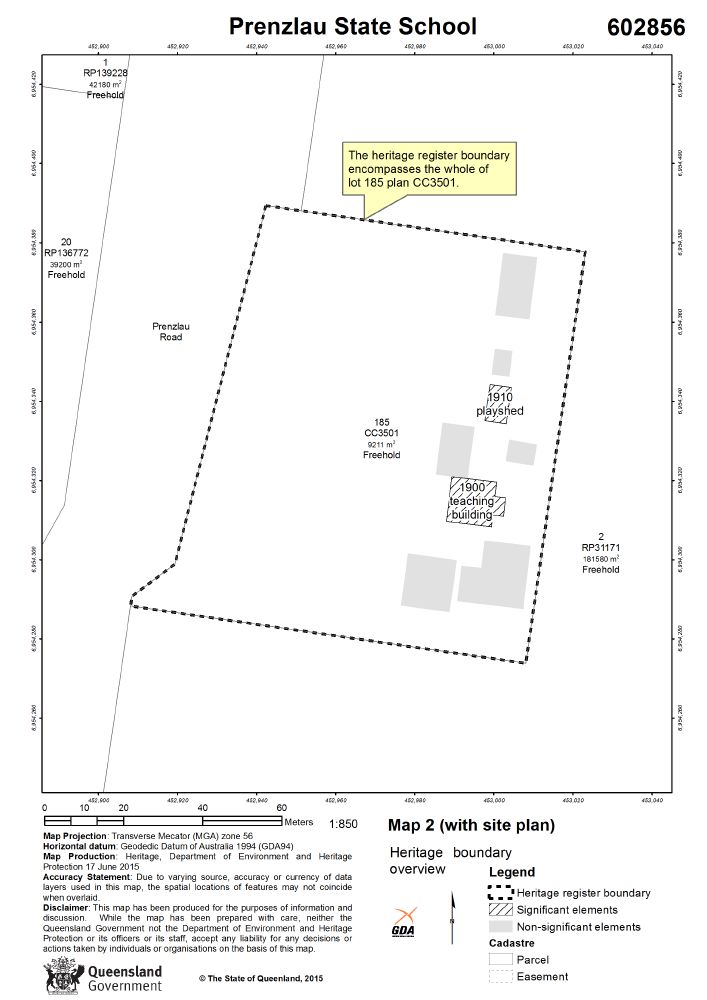
Site map, 2015

Prenzlau State School occupies a 0.92 hectares (2.3 acres) site in the rural locality of Prenzlau in the Lockyer Valley. Surrounded by hills and paddocks, the site slopes gently down towards Prenzlau Road, which forms the western boundary. The school buildings are set well back from the road, grouped together on the highest point of the site in the southeast corner. Standing approximately in the centre of this group is the Department of Public Works (DPW) teaching building (1900, used as the school office in 2015). Orientated west to address the road, the former front verandah has been enclosed and access is now via staircases to the north and south sides. The playshed (1910) stands to the north of the DPW teaching building. The grounds contain open lawns, mature shade trees, and a tennis court in the southwest corner.

=== Department of Public Works teaching building (1900) ===
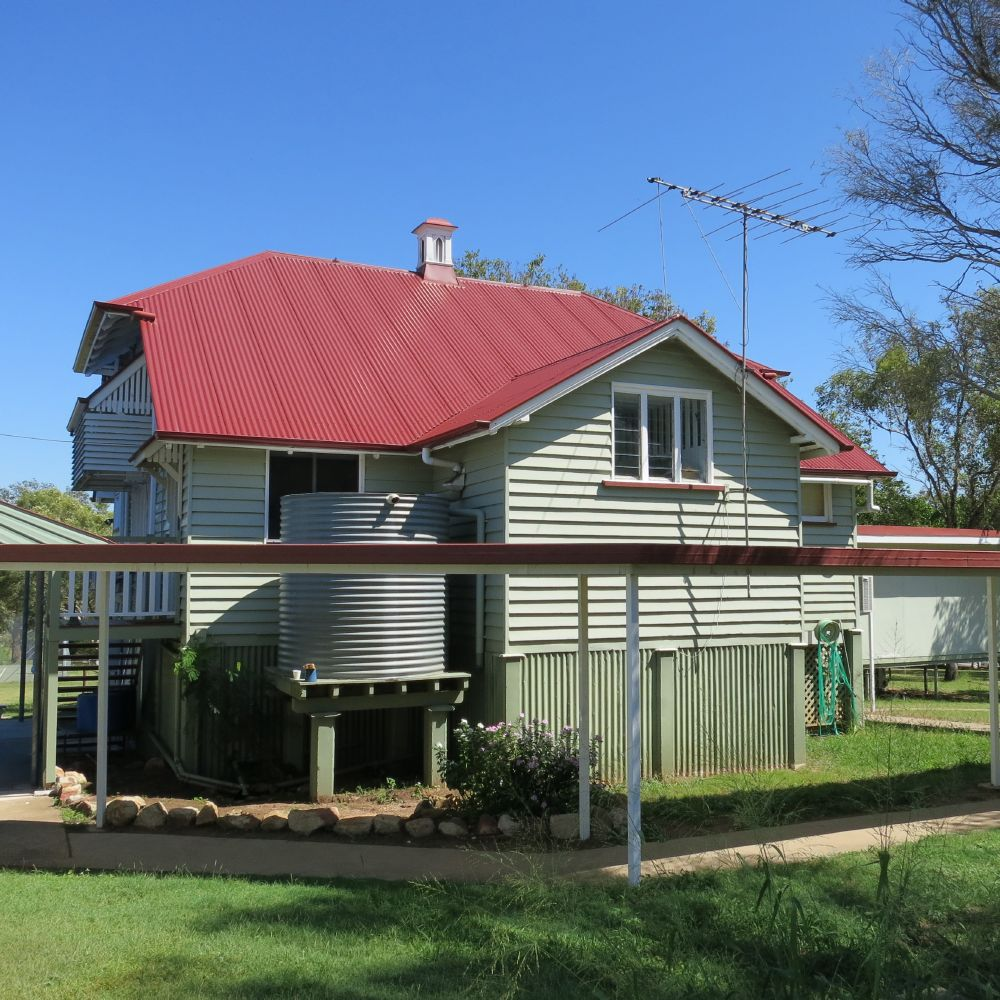
Prenzlau State School, east elevation, 2015

The DPW teaching building is a highset, timber-framed building on concrete stumps with a timber floor. The walls are clad in weatherboards and the front and rear verandahs have been enclosed. An annexe is attached to the rear (east) verandah. The north and south end walls each have large banks of early timber windows protected by timber hoods with decorative brackets. The roof is hipped, clad in corrugated metal sheeting and has an original metal ventilation fleche in the centre. A section of the roof overhangs the end walls, designed to shade the original high windows. The eaves are unlined and the exposed rafter ends are moulded.

Early windows throughout the building consist of a bottom row of casements with horizontally centre-pivoting windows above, and an additional top row of centre-pivoting fanlights in the end walls. Windows to the annexe retain their early framing but have been replaced with glass louvres.

Both verandahs have a raked ceiling lined with wide beaded boards and a single skin verandah wall with externally exposed studwork and cross-bracing. Doorways and windows occupy their original, symmetrical positions in the verandah walls, except for the northwest window which has been recently converted into a door. The eastern doorway retains a two-light fanlight and four-panelled, double timber door. The northern end of the rear verandah is enclosed by a partition wall lined with vertical, v-jointed tongue-and-groove boards and is accessed by a half-glazed timber door.

The former annexe has been converted into a store room. The ceiling is coved and lined with flat sheeting with cover strips. The west wall is lined with horizontal beaded boards and all other walls are single-skin with exposed studs. The windows retain their sill and the framing has beaded edges. A batten screen separates the north end of the room.

Walls in the former classroom are lined with wide, horizontal timber boards that have a chamferboard profile on the rear (verandah) side and are flat with beaded edges on the classroom side. The coved ceiling is lined with beaded boards and has exposed metal tie rods and square ventilation panels (now enclosed). The floors are lined with modern carpet or linoleum (not of cultural heritage significance).

The World War II honour board is a flat, painted timber board, currently framed and protected under glass. In 2015 it hangs on the eastern wall of the classroom.

The understorey has a concrete slab floor and the concrete stumps have chamfered edges. The area is partially enclosed with corrugated metal sheeting around the western, southern and eastern perimeter. The southeast corner has been further enclosed to form a store room. Doors in the south wall and into the storeroom are braced-and-ledged timber doors.

=== Playshed (1910) ===
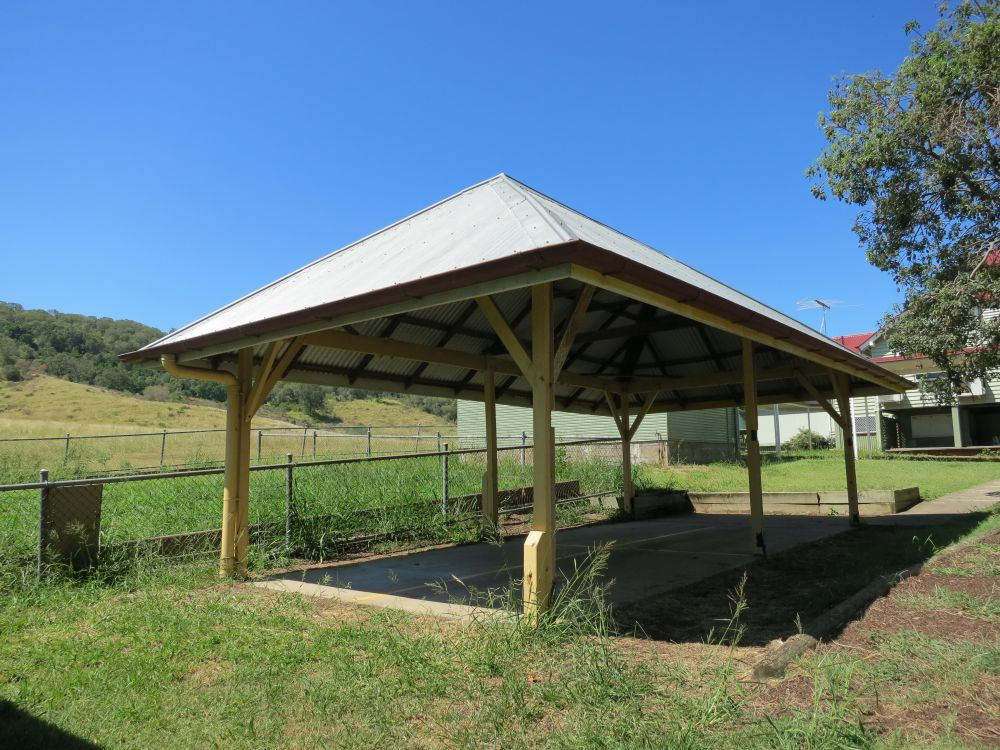
Playshed, 2015

The playshed is a small six-post timber structure with concrete slab floor and a hipped roof clad in corrugated metal sheeting. The posts are braced to the roof framing by brackets and the roof framing is exposed. Notches in the posts along the western side and corrugations in the edge of the floor slab indicate that an enclosing wall of corrugated metal sheeting has been removed from this side.

=== Grounds and views ===
The sloping site, open lawns, trees and gardens of the grounds form an attractive setting for the early school buildings. The main entrance from Prenzlau Road is ornamented by a metal archway displaying the dates "1894-1994". Mature trees are located around the perimeter of the school site, around the former teachers residence yard in the northwest corner, and in a forestry plot of 17 hoop pine trees (Araucaria cunninghamii) near the north boundary. Significant tree species' include jacaranda (Jacaranda mimosifolia), leopard tree (Flindersia maculosa), crow's ash (Flindersia australis), and she-oak (Allocasuarina).

The school is prominent in its location and picturesque views of the surrounding countryside are obtained from within the school grounds.

== Heritage listing ==
Prenzlau State School was listed on the Queensland Heritage Register on 12 June 2015 having satisfied the following criteria.

The place is important in demonstrating the evolution or pattern of Queensland's history.

Prenzlau State School (established in 1894 as a provisional school) is important in demonstrating the evolution of state education and its associated architecture in Queensland. It retains excellent examples of standard government designs that were architectural responses to prevailing government educational philosophies. At Prenzlau State School these standard designs are: a Department of Public Works-designed teaching building (1900) demonstrating the evolution of timber schools buildings to provide adequate lighting and ventilation; and a playshed (1910), which demonstrates the education system's recognition of the importance of play in the curriculum; set within school grounds containing significant mature shade trees.

The World War II Honour Board located in the teaching building is important in demonstrating the school community's involvement in a major world event. War memorials, including honour boards, are a tribute to those who served, and those who died, from a particular community. They are an important element of Queensland's towns and cities and are also important in demonstrating a common pattern of commemoration across Queensland and Australia.

The place is important in demonstrating the principal characteristics of a particular class of cultural places.

Prenzlau State School is important in demonstrating the principal characteristics of Queensland state schools with their later modifications. These include: timber-framed buildings constructed to standard designs by the Queensland Government; and generous, landscaped sites with mature shade trees, play areas and sporting facilities. The school is a good example of a modest, regional school complex.

The Department of Public Works-designed building (1900) is an excellent, intact example of a regional timber school and is important in demonstrating the principal characteristics of its type. It retains its hipped roof with ventilation fleche; early timber joinery; single large classroom with generous verandahs (now enclosed); rear annexe; coved ceiling; and single skin verandah walls. Changing philosophies about improving ventilation and lighting of classroom interiors are evident in the modifications made to the building, which include its conversion to a highset form and enlarged areas of windows.

The playshed (1910) retains its hipped timber-framed roof supported on six, braced timber posts.

The place has a strong or special association with a particular community or cultural group for social, cultural or spiritual reasons.

Schools have always played an important part in Queensland communities. They typically retain significant and enduring connections with former pupils, parents, and teachers; provide a venue for social interaction and volunteer work; and are a source of pride, symbolising local progress and aspirations.

Prenzlau State School has a strong and ongoing association with the Prenzlau community. It was established in 1894 through the fundraising efforts of the local community and generations of Prenzlau children have been educated there. The place is important for its contribution to the educational development of Prenzlau and is a prominent community focal point and gathering place for social and commemorative events with widespread community support.

== See also ==
- History of state education in Queensland
- List of schools in West Moreton
