= Mount Tarampa, Queensland =

Mount Tarampa
- Suburb
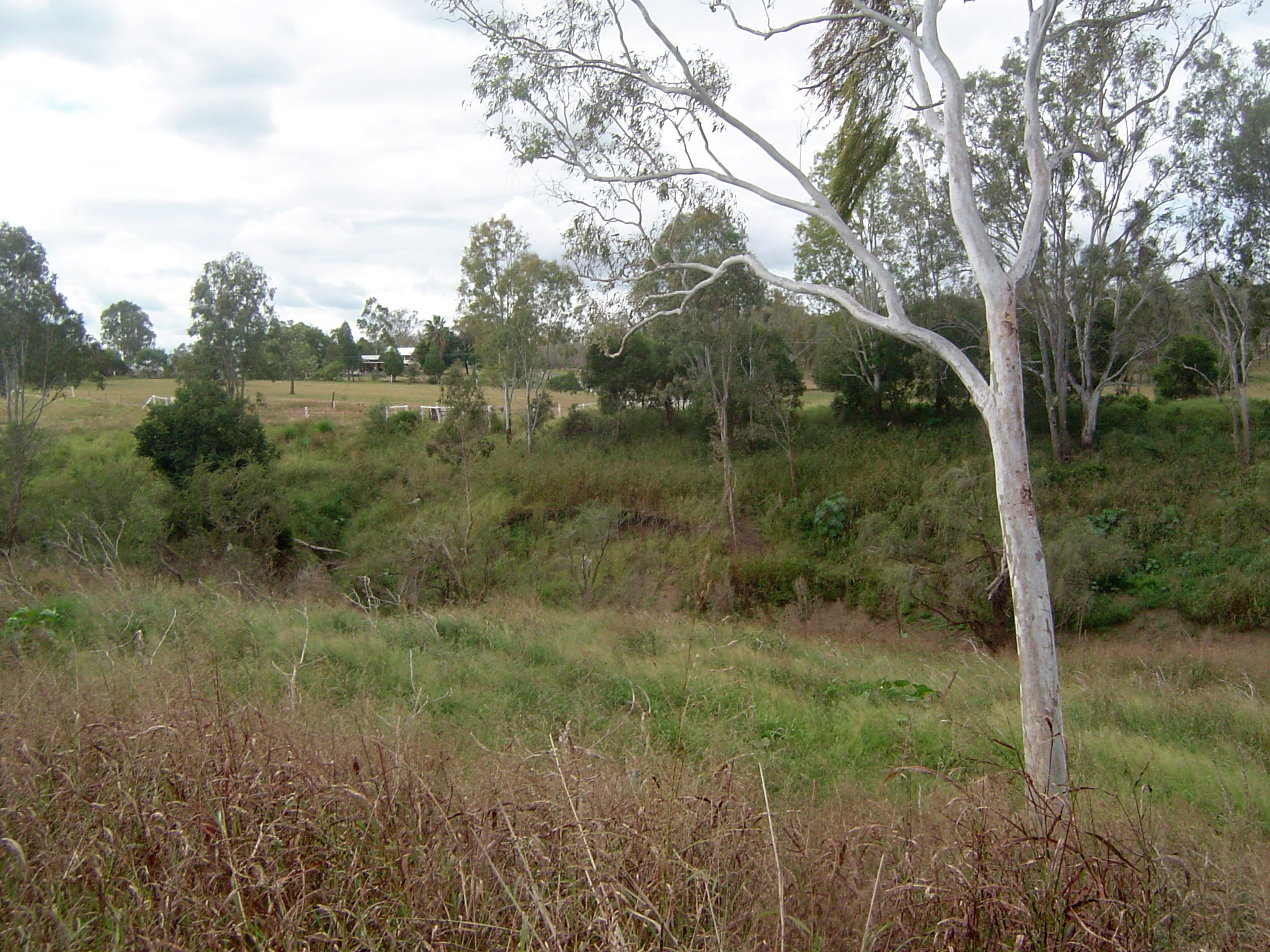
- Lower Lockyer Creek, Mount Tarampa, 2011

- Interactive map of Mount Tarampa
- Coordinates: 27.4652°S 152.4844°E
- Country: Australia
- State: Queensland
- LGA: Somerset Region
- Location: 11.9 km (7.4 mi) W of Lowood; 34.2 km (21.3 mi) S of Esk; 41.4 km (25.7 mi) NW of Ipswich CBD; 81.3 km (50.5 mi) W of Brisbane

Government
  - State electorate: Nanango
  - Federal division: Blair

Area
  - Total: 30.8 km^{2} (11.9 sq mi)

Population
  - Total: 501 (2021 census)
  - Density: 16.27/km^{2} (42.13/sq mi)
- Time zone: UTC+10:00 (AEST)
- Postcode: 4311
Suburbs around Mount Tarampa
Atkinsons Dam	Atkinsons Dam	Clarendon
Lockyer Waters	Mount Tarampa	Rifle Range
Kentville; Lynford	Lockrose	Brightview

Mount Tarampa is a rural locality in the Somerset Region, Queensland, Australia. In the 2021 census, Mount Tarampa had a population of 501 people.

== Geography ==
Lockyer Creek forms the southern and eastern borders of Mount Tarampa. Most of the area is flat apart from Mount Tarampa (150 metres above sea level) which is located in the southern part of the locality. The land use near the creek is irrigated crop growing with some grazing on native vegetation in the north-west of the locality. The eastern part of the locality is mainly rural residential with the school located in this area.

== History ==
Mount Tarampa Provisional School opened on 23 July 1906, becoming Mount Tarampa State School on 1 January 1909.

== Demographics ==
In the 2016 census, Mount Tarampa had a population of 481 people.

In the 2021 census, Mount Tarampa had a population of 501 people.

== Education ==
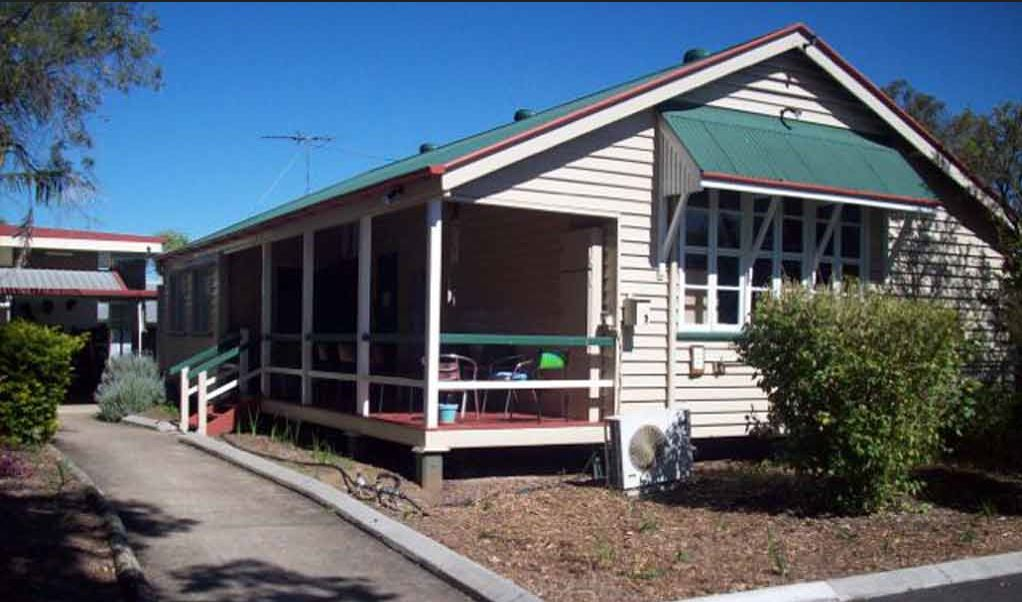
Mount Tarampa State School, 2025

Mount Tarampa State School is a government primary (Prep–6) school for boys and girls at 9 Profkes Road (27.4552°S 152.4899°E). In 2016, the school had an enrolment of 44 students with 4 teachers (3 equivalent full-time) and 6 non-teaching staff (3 equivalent full-time). In 2018, the school had an enrolment of 60 students with 4 teachers and 7 non-teaching staff (4 full-time equivalent).

There are no secondary schools in Mount Tarampa. The nearest government secondary school is Lowood State High School in Lowood to the east. There are also non-government schools in Gatton, Laidley, Rosewood, and Ipswich suburbs.

== Heritage listings ==
Mount Tarampa has the following heritage-listed sites:

- Mount Tarampa State School, 9 Profkes Road
