= Plainland =

- Suburb
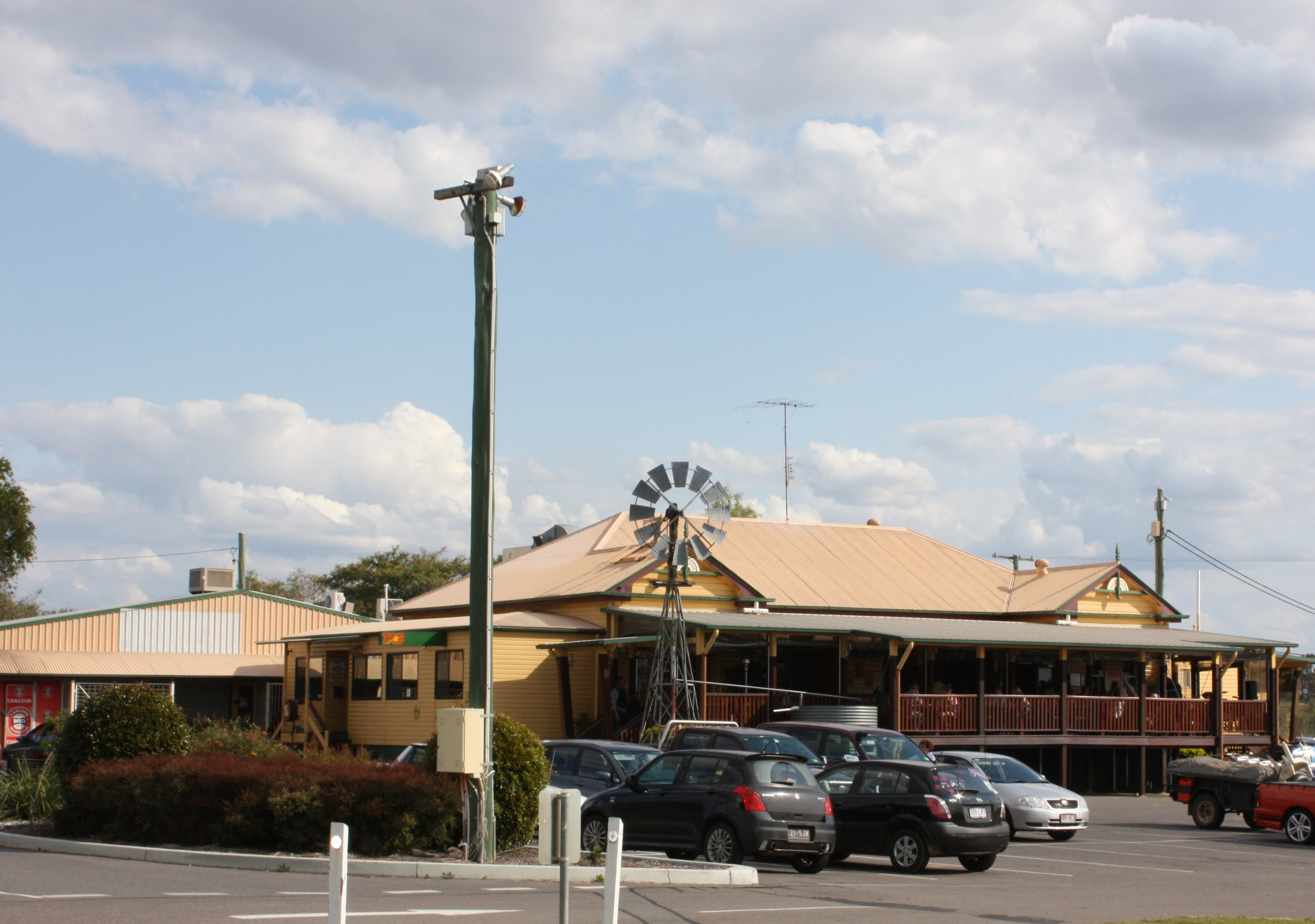
- Porters Plainland Hotel, opened in 1905

- Interactive map of Plainland
- Coordinates: 27.5816°S 152.4163°E
- Country: Australia
- State: Queensland
- LGA: Lockyer Valley Region
- Location: 17.0 km (10.6 mi) E of Gatton; 52.3 km (32.5 mi) E of Toowoomba; 76.3 km (47.4 mi) WSW of Brisbane

Government
  - State electorate: Lockyer
  - Federal division: Wright

Area
  - Total: 22.3 km^{2} (8.6 sq mi)

Population
  - Total: 1,930 (2021 census)
  - Density: 86.5/km^{2} (224.2/sq mi)
- Time zone: UTC+10:00 (AEST)
- Postcode: 4341
- County: Churchill
- Parish: Laidley
Suburbs around Plainland
Glenore Grove	Regency Downs	Hatton Vale
Forest Hill	Plainland	Summerholm
Laidley North	Laidley North	Summerholm

Plainland is a town in the Lockyer Valley Region, Queensland, Australia. In the 2021 census, Plainland had a population of 1,930 people, an increase of 21% from the 2016 census.

== Geography ==
Plainland is in the Lockyer Valley, located 75 kilometres (47 mi) west of Brisbane, the state capital, along the Warrego Highway. Laidley–Plainland Road enters from the southwest.

== History ==
Plainland was settled by a dozen German families in 1878. The families were mostly from West Prussia. The community constructed a Lutheran church in 1884 which was replaced in 1897. About 60 families, mainly of German origin, were living in the area in 1911—serviced by three blacksmiths, the Plainland Hotel, a state school and a general store.

Plainland State School opened circa 1886 and closed in 1966. It was on a 10-acre (4.0 ha) site at 3 Victor Court (27.5718°S 152.4162°E). Plainland Post Office opened by 1899 (a receiving office had been open from 1887) and closed in 1966. The area received a public bar and hotel in 1905 with the opening of the Plainland Hotel. Schulte's Gourmet Market opened in 1952, selling a range of local meats and produce to this day. The area experienced a general decline in population throughout the mid-20th century, before starting to recover in the late 90's.

The area became the subject of considerable development in the late 90's and early 2000's. Faith Lutheran College opened in 1999. Federal funding led to the construction of a dedicated highway interchange with the Warrego Highway in 2004, which was followed shortly thereafter with the Plainland Plaza development in 2005, which hosts a supermarket amongst other boutique stores. Plainland's highway frontage prompted the development of the Plainland Travel Centre in 2009, which includes truck refuelling and driver facilities, and fast food staples.

Further commercial development remains ongoing, with the opening of other businesses including the region's only Bunnings, as well as ALDI. Porter's Plainland Hotel has also expanded to include an award-winning hotel and function centre, and celebrated 120 years of local business in 2025. Plainland Home + Life acts as the town's second retail centre, hosting larger format stores, medical facilities, and a swimming school. Plainland Plaza is also in the process of undertaking a substantive expansion which will double the size of the shopping centre, including a Coles, town square, and further shopping.

The area has also been the subject of rapid residential growth and development, including the substantive urban real estate development 'Plainland Crossing' being built in stages through the late 2010's, and the almost complete market saturation of closely-held surrounding acreage and lifestyle residential blocks. To support this growing population, Sophia College opened in 2021 with Year 7 enrolments initially, progressively extending the years offered each year until Year 12 becomes available in 2026. In October 2025, the Catholic Church building in Coominya was relocated to become the chapel at Sophia College in Plainland.

== Demographics ==
In the 2011 census, Plainland had a population of 1,672 people.

In the 2016 census, Plainland had a population of 1,596 people.

In the 2021 census, Plainland had a population of 1,930 people.

== Events ==
A farmers' market is held adjacent to the hotel on Sundays. Other local events include the Sophia College twilight markets, and the monthly Schulte's Meet & Greet car show.

== Education ==
Faith Lutheran College is a private secondary (Years 7 to 12) school for boys and girls at 5 Faith Avenue (27.5680°S 152.4161°E), operated by Lutheran Education Queensland. In 2016, the school had an enrolment of 719 students with 56 teachers (53.95 full-time equivalent) and 63 non-teaching staff (48.95 full-time equivalent). In 2017, the school had an enrolment of 711 students with 59 teachers (57 full-time equivalent) and 63 non-teaching staff (43 full-time equivalent).

Sophia College is a Catholic secondary school for boys and girls at 56 Otto Road (corner of Gehrke Road, 27.5565°S 152.4226°E). In 2024, the school had an enrolment of 373 students in Years 7 to 10 (Years 11 and 12 are not yet offered with 36 teachers (34.8 full-time equivalent) and 33 non-teaching staff (25 full-time equivalent).

There are no government schools in Plainland. The nearest government primary schools are:

- Glenore Grove State School in neighbouring Glenore Grove to the north-west
- Hatton Vale State School in neighbouring Hatton Vale to the north-east
- Laidley District State School in Laidley to the south
- Forest Hill State School in neighbouring Forest Hill to the west

The nearest government secondary school is Laidley State High School in Laidley to the south.
