= Lockyer Valley =

Valley in Queensland, Australia

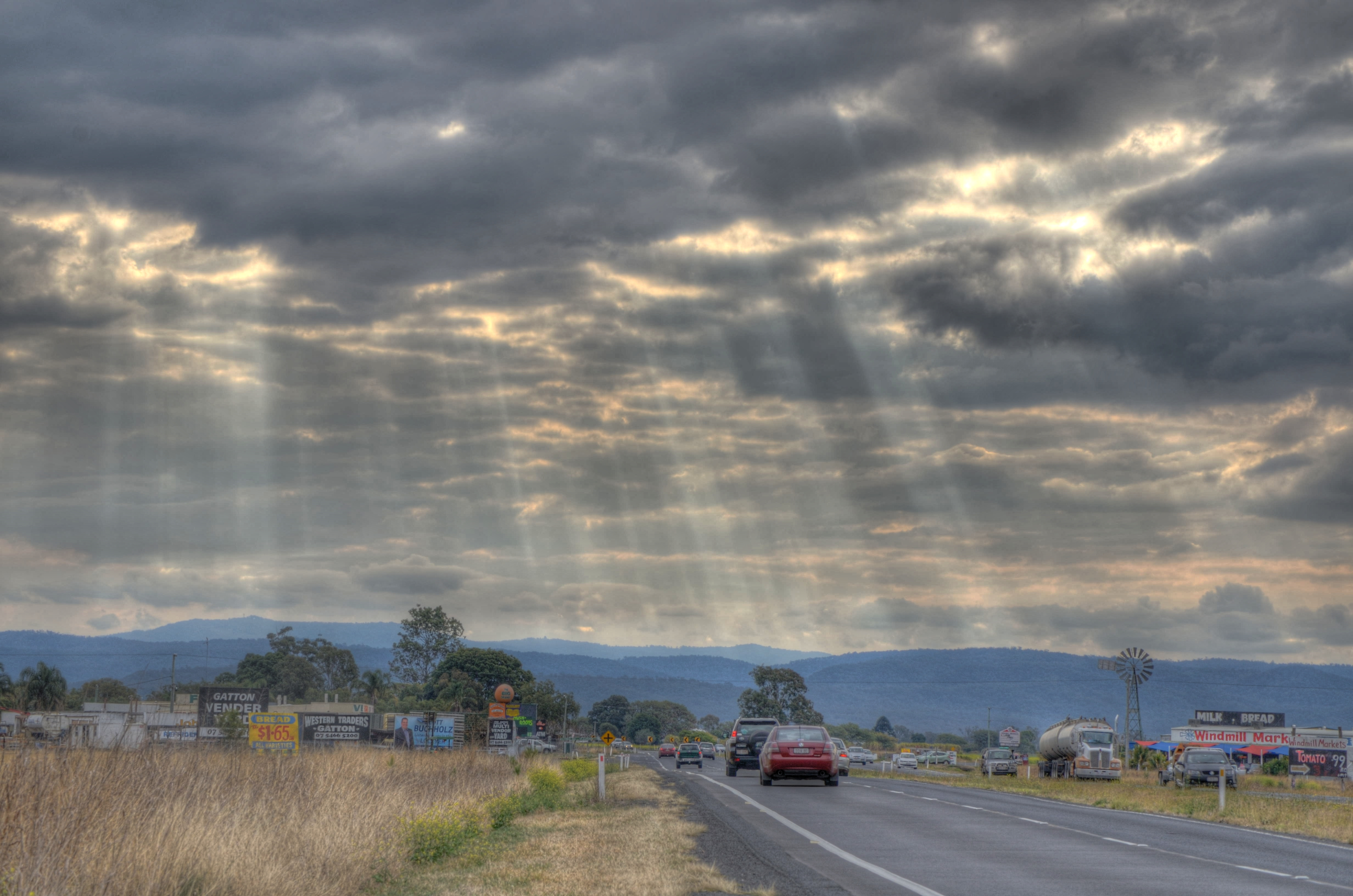
- Warrego Highway looking towards Toowoomba
- Area: 2,272 km^{2} (877 mi^{2})

Geography
- Country: Australia
- State: Queensland
- Region: South East Queensland
- Coordinates: 27.5588°S 152.2782°E
- River: Lockyer Creek
- Interactive map of Lockyer Valley

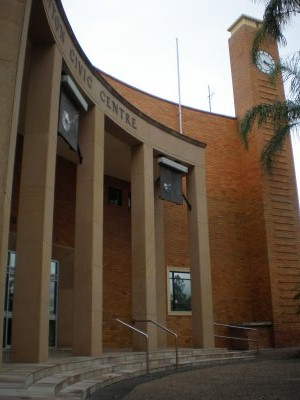
Gatton is the largest town in the valley

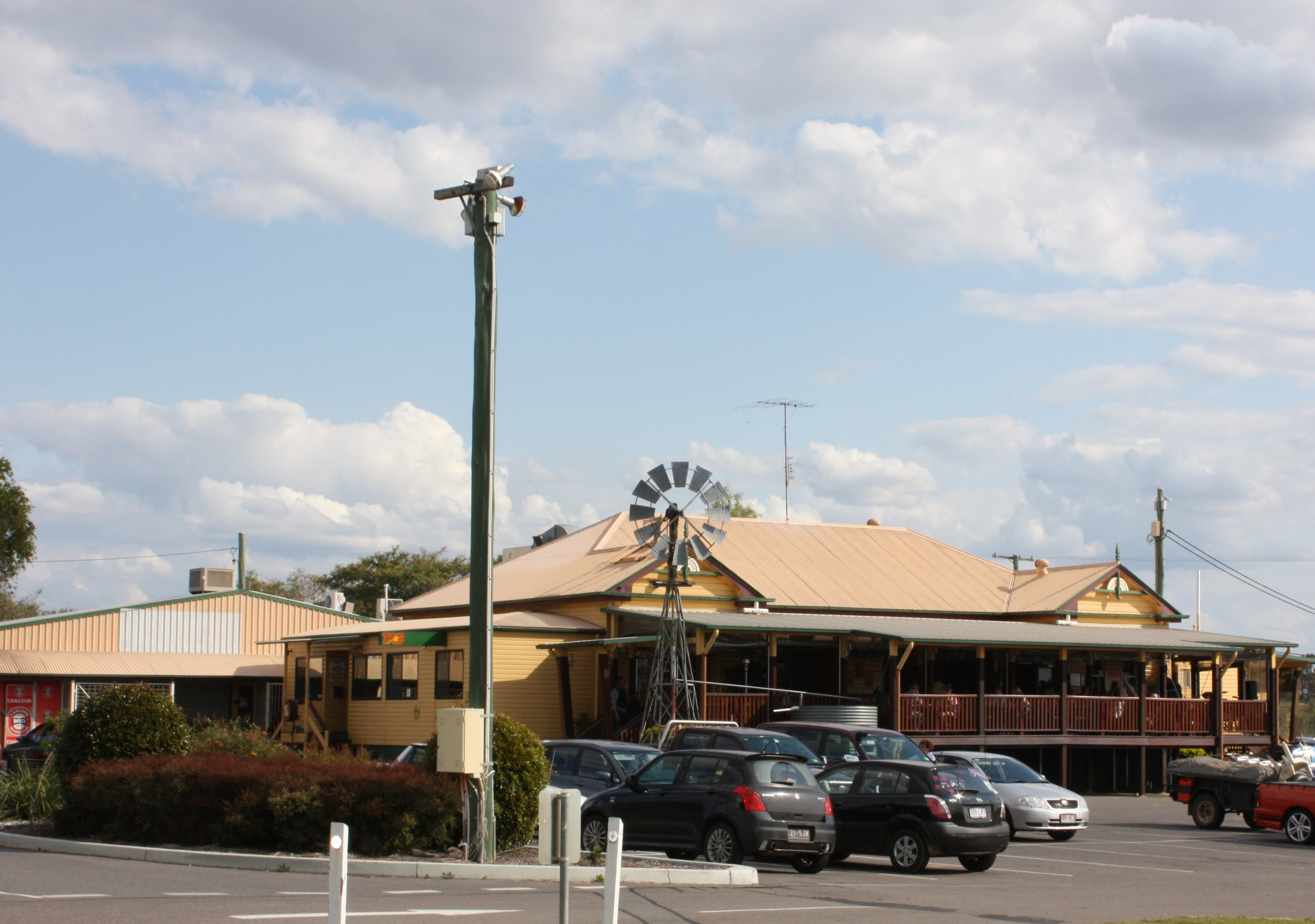
Plainland's historic Porter's Hotel

The Lockyer Valley is an area of rich farmlands that lies to the west of Brisbane, Queensland, Australia and east of Toowoomba. The Lockyer Valley is rated among the top ten most fertile farming areas in the world, and the intensively cultivated area grows the most diverse range of commercial fruit and vegetables of any area in Australia. The valley is referred to as "Australia's Salad Bowl" to describe the area as one of Australia's premium food bowls.

The valley is experiencing increasing urbanisation at both its eastern and western extremities. With a combination of vibrant rural living and affordable land and house prices, the region is experiencing rapid growth and development between the Brisbane-Ipswich conurbation in the east and Toowoomba in the west. Urban planning measures have been implemented to preserve the good quality agricultural land and rural feel of the valley. Such measures largely confine future development to non-arable land on the slopes of the hills.

== Geography ==
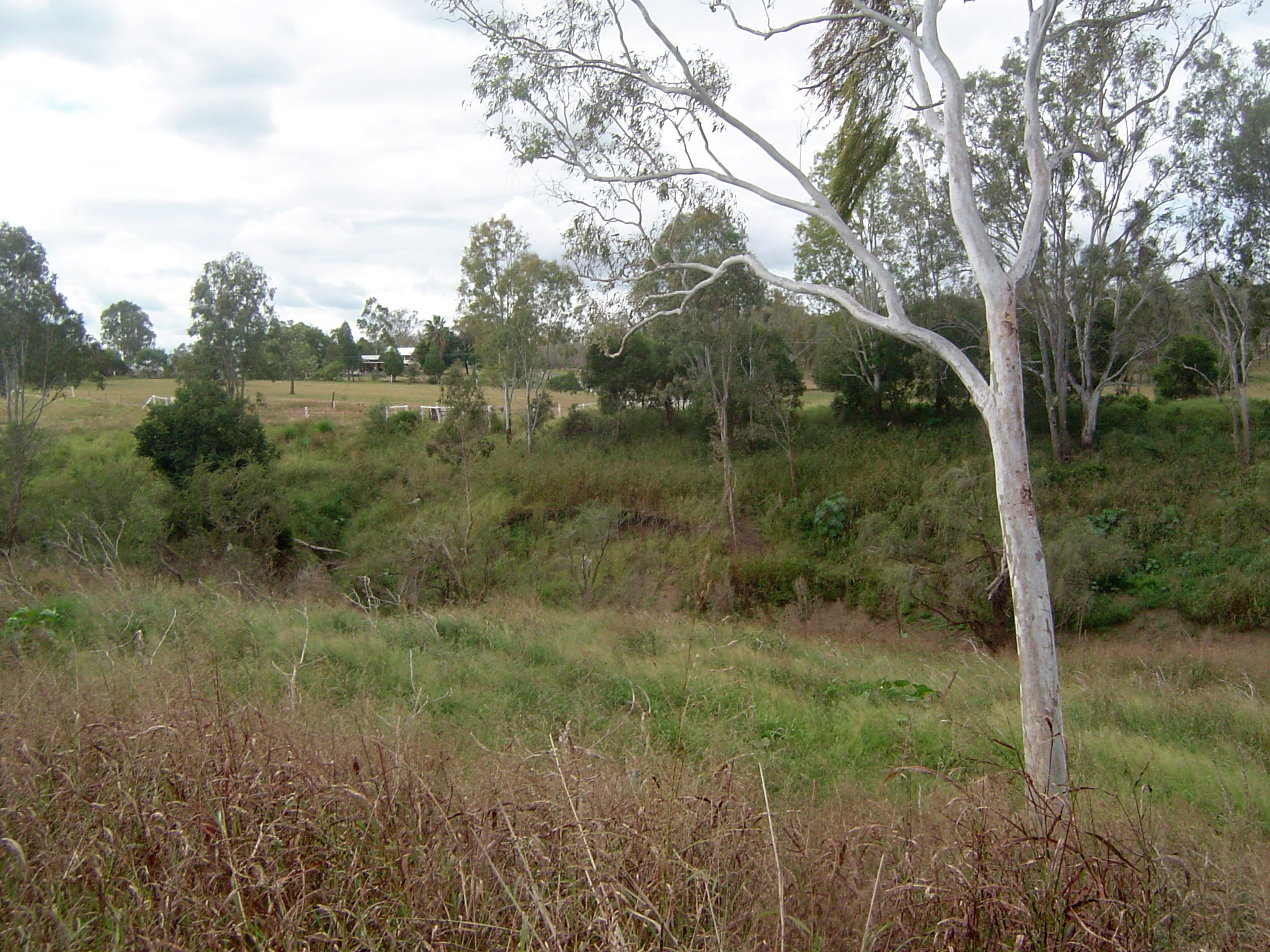
Lower Lockyer Creek, 2011

The valley is enclosed on either side by the Great Dividing Range and lies within the Lockyer Valley Region local government area. The largest town in the Lockyer Valley is Gatton, followed by the towns of Laidley, Withcott, and Plainland. Other notable centres include Hatton Vale, Helidon, Forest Hill, Grantham, and Murphys Creek.

Lockyer Creek and its tributaries drain the valley and forms a tributary of the Brisbane River that eventually empties into Moreton Bay. Many of the creeks in the valley are ephemeral. The valley has a number of small dams that serve local storage needs, including Atkinson Dam built in 1970, Bill Gunn Dam and Lake Clarendon. 12 different land types have been identified in the valley. The banks of waterways in the Lockyer Valley have been identified as the source of silt, which caused problems for the Mount Crosby Pumping Station during Cyclone Oswald. In 2014, $8 million was allocated to prevent soil erosion within the Lockyer Valley.

== History ==
The valley was once home to the Kitabul people before the arrival of Europeans in the early 19th century. Today, the Jagera people are considered the traditional owners of the Lockyer Valley region.

One of the first white people known to the Indigenous people in the area was said to be "Boralcho" Baker, who lived with the Jagera people from 1826 for 18 years. In 1827, the explorer Allan Cunningham made his first contact.

Squatting licenses were first granted in New South Wales in 1836 for what was by then considered Crown land. Squatters arrived in the area east of the Darling Downs from 1840 onwards, and land clearing began for the grazing of live stock. The squatters lived in very basic huts like the DesJardins cottage, which can be seen at the Laidley Pioneer Village. From the late 1840s, many squatting licenses were turned into longer leases.

Increasing numbers of unfenced grazing sheep and stations saw the traditional food sources of Aborigines decrease considerably. Many of them retreated into the mountains where they found a smaller range of edible food sources than on the grasslands, which was one of the reasons for the near complete devastation of the Indigenous inhabitants of the area.

The town of Gatton was gazetted in 1855, making it one of Queensland's earliest European settlements. The valley was populated by German immigrants under a scheme organised by Lutheran Pastor Heussler.

The first rail line in the valley was opened in 1865 when the Ipswich to Grandchester services began operation. A small town developed in the 1870s while a small timber industry grew at about the same time. Structures in the valley were damaged by a 4.4 magnitude earthquake that struck the area on 17 November 1960. Between 1922 and 1960 the Laidley Valley railway line operated between Mulgowie and Laidley but was never profitable.

In 1994, a 41 hectare parcel of scrub, known as Berlin Scrub Nature Refuge, was the first land protected as a nature refuge under the Nature Conservation Act 1992 In January 2012, the Southern Queensland Correctional Centre, near Gatton, began operations.

== Climate ==
With an average annual rainfall of 780 mm, the Lockyer Valley is the driest part of South East Queensland. Rainfall is highly variable and droughts are experienced regularly.

The Lockyer Valley typically experiences temperatures higher than the Brisbane region in summer, but colder in the winter. In November 2008, the valley experienced some of the worst flooding in its recorded history with farmers experiencing total crop failure. The flooding claimed the lives of livestock as well as an elderly female in the Forest Hill area, caught up in the flooding whilst driving.

This event was overshadowed by severe flooding in January 2011. The towns of Withcott and Grantham were particularly hard hit. Flood related deaths were recorded in the communities of Spring Bluff, Murphys Creek, Grantham and Postmans Ridge. Many council-owned bridges in the valley were either completely gone or partially destroyed. To repair roads and drains the Lockyer Valley Region local government area initially estimated the repair bill to be A$176 million.

In 2012, a solar powered, radar based, imaging system was installed to detect dramatic rises in creek water levels. The cameras monitor conditions from atop a five to six-metre high pole to avoid damage during floods. An LED spotlight is used to take photos at night. When a flood event is detected the system enters a mode where images are taken more frequently. Real time data is transmitted to the council's disaster centre. The council spent $40,000 on the system.

== Agriculture ==
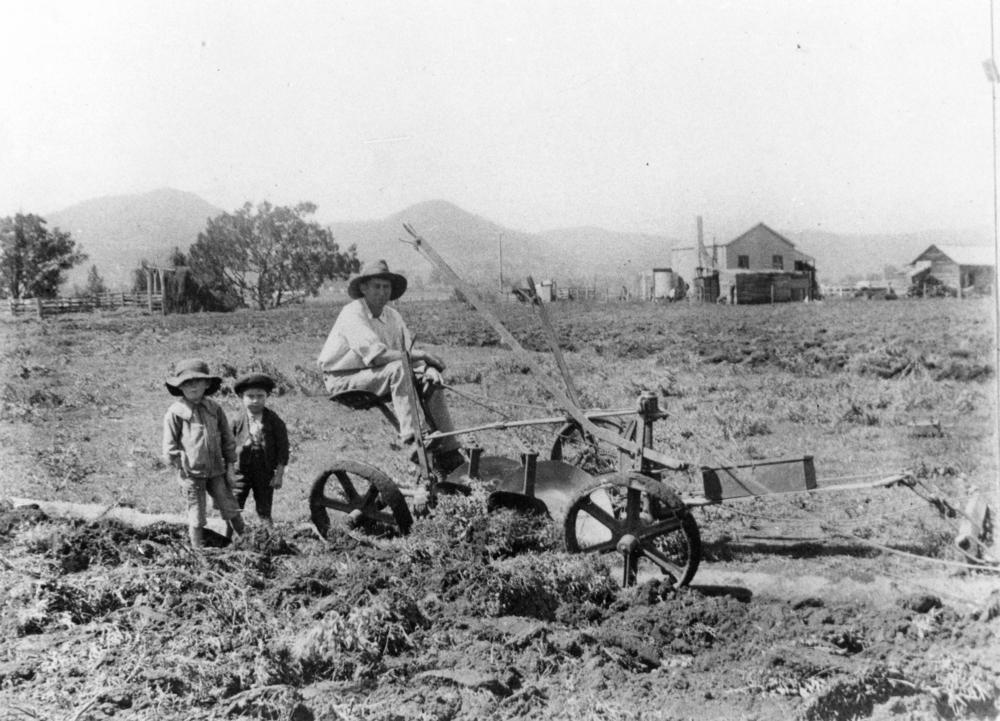
A farmer working the fields, 1907

The valley's main agricultural activities are intensive horticulture, cropping and grazing. Major crops grown in the areas include grains and vegetables. Cultivation of turf and lucerne for both dairy and racehorses is also widespread. Most of the water used in agriculture is sourced from below the surface. Farmers in the valley produce around 40% of the fresh vegetables consumed in South East Queensland. Most farms in the Lockyer Valley are small ranging from 100 to 1,000 hectares in size.

The valley contains fertile black soils which support a $160 million-a-year vegetable industry. A variable climate and all year cropping has placed significant strain on water supply from groundwater aquifers. The viability of agriculture in the Lockyer Valley has been questioned after unreliable rains during drought, pest outbreaks and crop damage during severe weather have led to a decrease in agricultural productivity. Some farmers have instigated the use of laser measurements to ensure irrigation systems are optimally configured and yields are high. Recycled wastewater from the Western Corridor Recycled Water Scheme could be used for irrigation in the Lockyer. The infrastructure is in place however the cost is prohibitive.

Nearly all the nation's processing beetroot is grown in the Lockyer Valley. In 2002, the number of beetroot farmers had reduced to just eight farms. Golden Circle sources vegetables from the Lockyer Valley.

== See also ==
- Agriculture in Australia
- Fassifern Valley
- List of valleys of Australia
