= Hatton Vale =

- Suburb
- Interactive map of Hatton Vale
- Coordinates: 27.5613°S 152.4761°E
- Country: Australia
- State: Queensland
- LGA: Lockyer Valley Region
- Location: 16.2 km (10.1 mi) NE of Laidley; 23.4 km (14.5 mi) E of Gatton; 33.4 km (20.8 mi) WNW of Ipswich; 70.8 km (44.0 mi) W of Brisbane

Government
  - State electorate: Lockyer
  - Federal division: Wright

Area
  - Total: 21.7 km^{2} (8.4 sq mi)

Population
  - Total: 1,555 (2021 census)
  - Density: 71.66/km^{2} (185.6/sq mi)
- Time zone: UTC+10:00 (AEST)
- Postcode: 4341
Suburbs around Hatton Vale
Regency Downs	Kensington Grove	Prenzlau
Plainland	Hatton Vale	Minden; Tallegalla
Summerholm	Summerholm	Woolshed

Hatton Vale is a rural locality in the Lockyer Valley Region, Queensland, Australia. In the 2021 census, Hatton Vale had a population of 1,555 people.

== Geography ==
Hatton Vale is in South East Queensland and on the Warrego Highway, 72 kilometres (45 mi) west of the state capital Brisbane and 36 kilometres (22 mi) west of the regional centre of Ipswich.

== History ==
Hatton Vale, originally known as "Tarampa Woolshed" was settled by German migrants in the 1870s as part of a closer settlement arrangement. The migrants established a Lutheran church in 1881 and an Apostolic church in 1889. The evangelist Heinrich Friedrich Niemeyer established Hatton Vale as the centre of the Apostolic Church of Queensland.

Hatton Vale Provisional School opened in 1881. On 18 October 1886, it became Hatton Vale State School.

Hatton Vale Post Office opened by 1903 (a receiving office had been open from 1881, known as Woolshed Creek until 1889) and closed in 1974.

The locality remained overwhelmingly German in character. A survey in 1902 identified 90% of the farmers in the area had German surnames and this was still the case in 1949.

In 1939 the Apostolic Church of Queensland decided to build a cathedral, but its construction was delayed by World War II and then by a shortage of building materials. The foundation stone was finally laid on 4 September 1948. The Hatton Vale Apostolic Cathedral was dedicated on Saturday 2 December 1950 by the Australian leader of the church, Apostle E. Zielke of Bundaberg. The ceremony was attended by nearly 2,000 people. The church has a 91-foot (28 m) spire, making it a landmark in the district.

Since 1990, Hatton Vale has seen significant residential development and become a dormitory suburb for nearby urban centres.

Hatton Vale Community Uniting Church was established in 1994.

== Demographics ==
In the 2011 census, Hatton Vale and the surrounding area had a population of 1,138.

In the 2016 census, Hatton Vale had a population of 1,521 people.

In the 2021 census, Hatton Vale had a population of 1,555 people.

== Education ==
Hatton Vale State School is a government primary (Early Childhood to Year 6) school for boys and girls at 27–35 Hannant Road (27.5434°S 152.4709°E). In 2017, the school had an enrolment of 441 students with 33 teachers (31 full-time equivalent) and 23 non-teaching staff (15 full-time equivalent). It includes a special education program.

There are no secondary schools in Hatton Vale. The nearest government secondary schools are Laidley State High School in Laidley to the south-west and Rosewood State High School in Rosewood to the south-east.

== Amenities ==
The locality hosts the headquarters of the Apostolic Church of Queensland along with a 1,200 seat church at 3 Niemeyer Road (27.5616°S 152.4529°E).

Hatton Vale Community Uniting Church is at 143 Zischke Road (27.5576°S 152.4582°E). It is part of the Bremer Brisbane Presbytery of the Uniting Church in Australia.

Other facilities in the locality include local shopping and a golf course and recreation club.
