= Churchable, Queensland =

Churchable
- Suburb
- Interactive map of Churchable
- Coordinates: 27.4252°S 152.3755°E
- Country: Australia
- State: Queensland
- LGA: Lockyer Valley Region
- Location: 26.5 km (16.5 mi) WNW of Lowood; 35.1 km (21.8 mi) NE of Gatton; 56.7 km (35.2 mi) NW of Ipswich; 96.7 km (60.1 mi) W of Brisbane CBD

Government
  - State electorate: Lockyer
  - Federal division: Wright

Area
  - Total: 29.2 km^{2} (11.3 sq mi)

Population
  - Total: 256 (2021 census)
  - Density: 8.77/km^{2} (22.71/sq mi)
- Time zone: UTC+10:00 (AEST)
- Postcode: 4311
Suburbs around Churchable
Buaraba	Buaraba	Buaraba
Spring Creek	Churchable	Atkinsons Dam
Spring Creek	Lockyer Waters	Lockyer Waters

Churchable is a rural locality in the Lockyer Valley Region, Queensland, Australia. In the 2021 census, Churchable had a population of 256 people.

== Geography ==
The locality is bounded to the west by the Gatton Esk Road and to the north by Atkinsons Dam Road.

Balaam Hill at the southernmost point of the locality (27.4517°S 152.3700°E) rises to 160 metres (520 ft) above sea level.

The land use is a mixture of rural residential housing, grazing on native vegetation, and crop growing.

== Demographics ==
In the 2016 census, Churchable had a population of 261 people.

In the 2021 census, Churchable had a population of 256 people.

== Education ==
There are no schools in Churchable. The nearest government primary schools are Lake Claredon State School in Lake Claredon to the south, Kentville State School in Kentville to the south-east, and Coominya State School in Coominya to the north-east. The nearest government secondary schools are Lowood State High School in Lowood to the east and Lockyer District State High School in Gatton to the south-west.

== Facilities ==
Artiefield Airstrip is at 30 Jamieson Road (27.4320°S 152.3935°E). Artiefield Flight Training operates from the airstrip.
