= Buaraba, Queensland =

Buaraba
- Suburb
- Interactive map of Buaraba
- Coordinates: 27.3652°S 152.3011°E
- Country: Australia
- State: Queensland
- LGA: Somerset Region
- Location: 26.8 km (16.7 mi) SW of Esk; 30.5 km (19.0 mi) N of Gatton; 36.0 km (22.4 mi) WNW of Lowood; 66.6 km (41.4 mi) NE of Toowoomba; 109 km (68 mi) WNW of Brisbane

Government
  - State electorate: Nanango
  - Federal division: Blair

Area
  - Total: 142.4 km^{2} (55.0 sq mi)

Population
  - Total: 170 (2021 census)
  - Density: 1.19/km^{2} (3.09/sq mi)
- Time zone: UTC+10:00 (AEST)
- Postcode: 4311
Suburbs around Buaraba
Redbank Creek	Redbank Creek	Mount Hallen
Ravensbourne; Palmtree	Buaraba	Coominya; Atkinsons Dam
Buaraba South	Vinegar Hill	Spring Creek; Churchable

Buaraba is a rural locality in the Somerset Region, Queensland, Australia. In the 2021 census, Buaraba had a population of 170 people.

== Geography ==
Buaraba Creek flows through from west to south-east. Most of Ravensbourne National Park is within the locality.

The Esk-Hampton Road (State Route 85) runs along the north-western boundary, and the Gatton Esk Road passes through the eastern part.

== History ==
Buaraba Provisional School opened in 1922. In January 1936, it became Buaraba State School. It closed in 1966. The school was at 421 Buaraba Creek Road (27.3631°S 152.32112°E). The school building is still extant.

== Demographics ==
In the 2016 census, Buaraba had a population of 181 people.

In the 2021 census, Buaraba had a population of 170 people.

== Education ==
There are no schools in Buaraba. The nearest government primary schools are:

- Esk State School in Esk to the north-east
- Coominya State School in neighbouring Coominya to the east
- Lake Claredon State School in Lake Claredon to the south
- Murphy's Creek State School in Murphys Creek to the south-west
- Crow's Nest State School in Crows Nest to the north-west

The nearest government secondary schools are:

- Lockyer District State High School (to Year 12) in Gatton to the south
- Highfields State Secondary College (to Year 12) in Highfields to the south-west
- Crow's Nest State School (to Year 10) in Crows Nest to the north-west
- Lowood State High School (to Year 12) in Lowood to the south-east
