= Lockyer Waters, Queensland =

Lockyer Waters
- Suburb
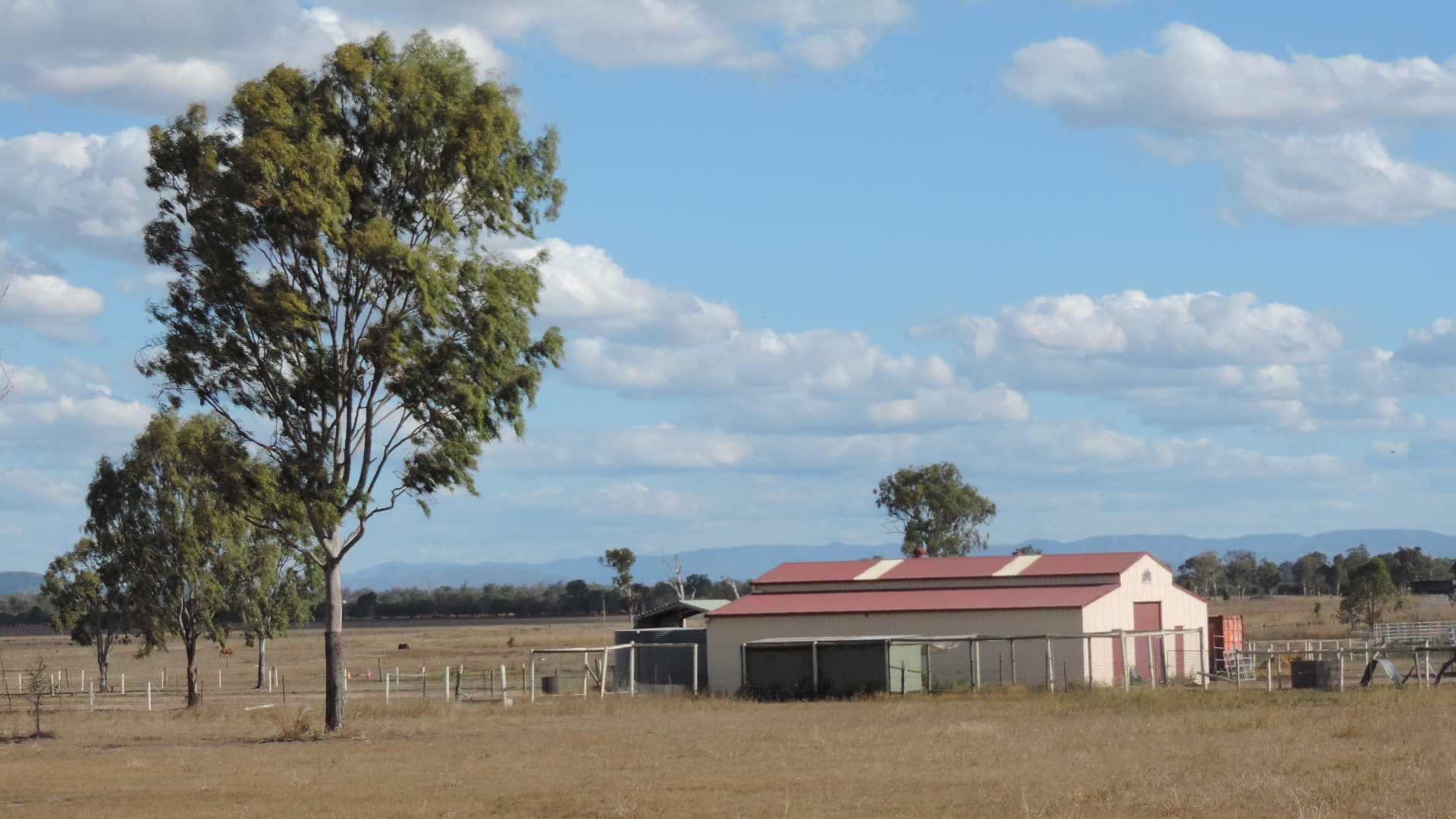
- Rural landscape, 2020

- Interactive map of Lockyer Waters
- Coordinates: 27.4538°S 152.4047°E
- Country: Australia
- State: Queensland
- LGA: Lockyer Valley Region
- Location: 20.4 km (12.7 mi) NE of Gatton; 52.7 km (32.7 mi) NW of Ipswich; 54.4 km (33.8 mi) ENE of Toowoomba CBD; 93.9 km (58.3 mi) W of Brisbane

Government
  - State electorate: Lockyer
  - Federal divisions: Wright; Blair

Area
  - Total: 16.6 km^{2} (6.4 sq mi)

Population
  - Total: 538 (2021 census)
  - Density: 32.41/km^{2} (83.9/sq mi)
- Time zone: UTC+10:00 (AEST)
- Postcode: 4311
Suburbs around Lockyer Waters
Churchable	Churchable	Atkinsons Dam
Spring Creek	Lockyer Waters	Mount Tarampa
Morton Vale	Morton Vale	Kentville

Lockyer Waters is a rural locality in the Lockyer Valley Region, Queensland, Australia. In the 2021 census, Lockyer Waters had a population of 538 people.

== Geography ==
Seven Mile Lagoon is a waterhole at 27.455°S 152.4275°E.

The land use is a mix of rural residential and agricultural use, predominantly grazing on native vegetation.

== History ==
The name Lockyer Waters was approved by Governor in Council 22 May 1992. The name was derived from Lockyer Creek, which was probably named by Allan Cunningham in July 1829, after Major Edmund Lockyer.

== Demographics ==
In the 2016 census, Lockyer Waters had a population of 561 people.

In the 2021 census, Lockyer Waters had a population of 538 people.

== Amenities ==
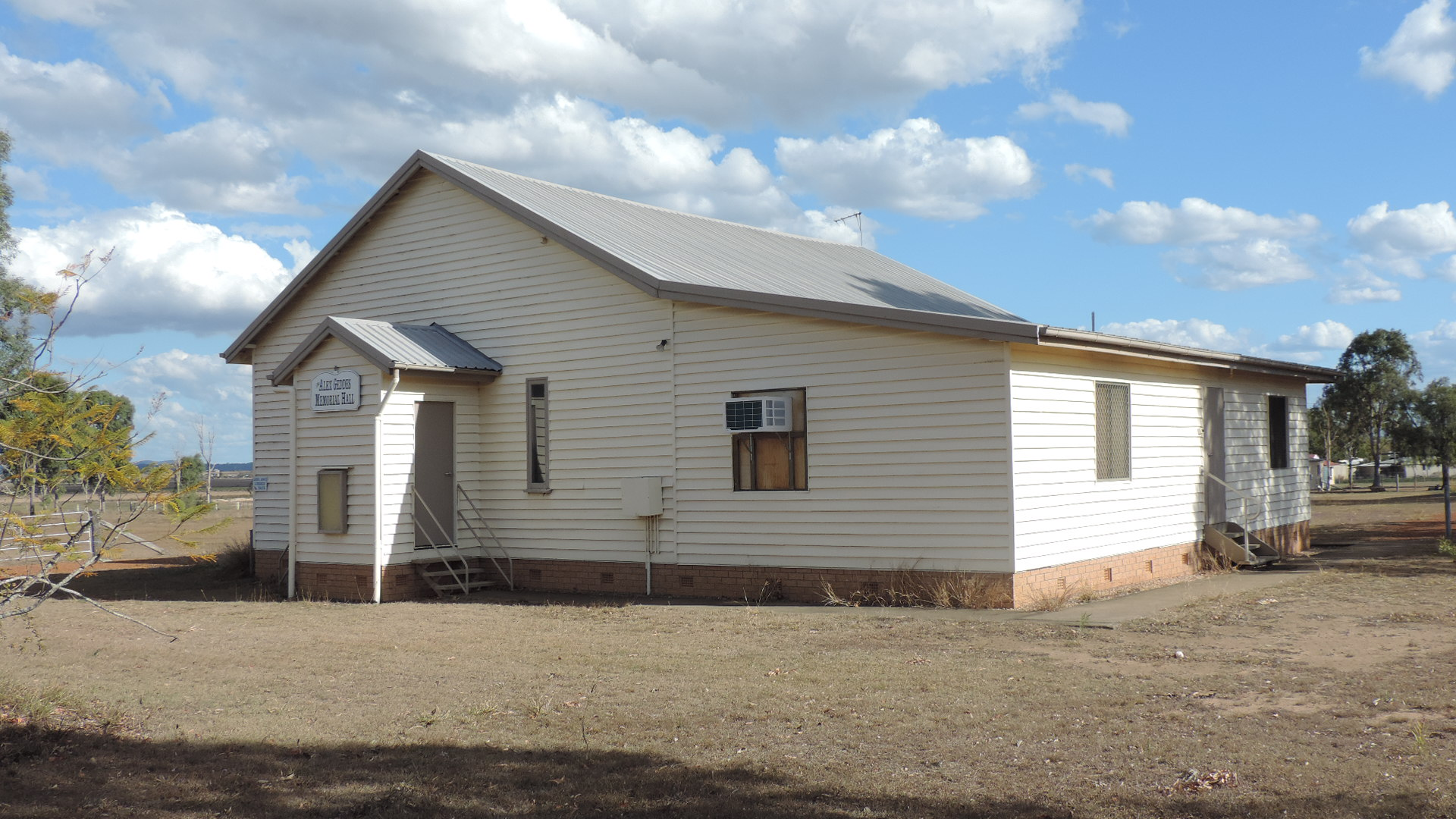
Alex Geddes Memorial Hall, 2020

The Alex Geddes Memorial Hall on the corner of Markai Road and Topaz Crescent (27.4528°S 152.4172°E) is available for community events. A children's playground is located beside it.

The Lockyer Waters Rural Fire Brigade is located at 17 Topaz Crescent (27.4532°S 152.4166°E).

== Education ==
There are no schools in Lockyer Waters. The nearest government primary schools are Kentville State School in neighbouring Kentville to the south-east, Mount Tarampa State School in neighbouring Mount Tarampa to the east and Lake Clarendon State School in Lake Clarendon to the south-west. The nearest government secondary schools are Lowood State High School in Lowood to the east and Lockyer District State High School in Gatton to the south-west.
