= Atkinsons Dam, Queensland =

Atkinsons Dam
- Suburb
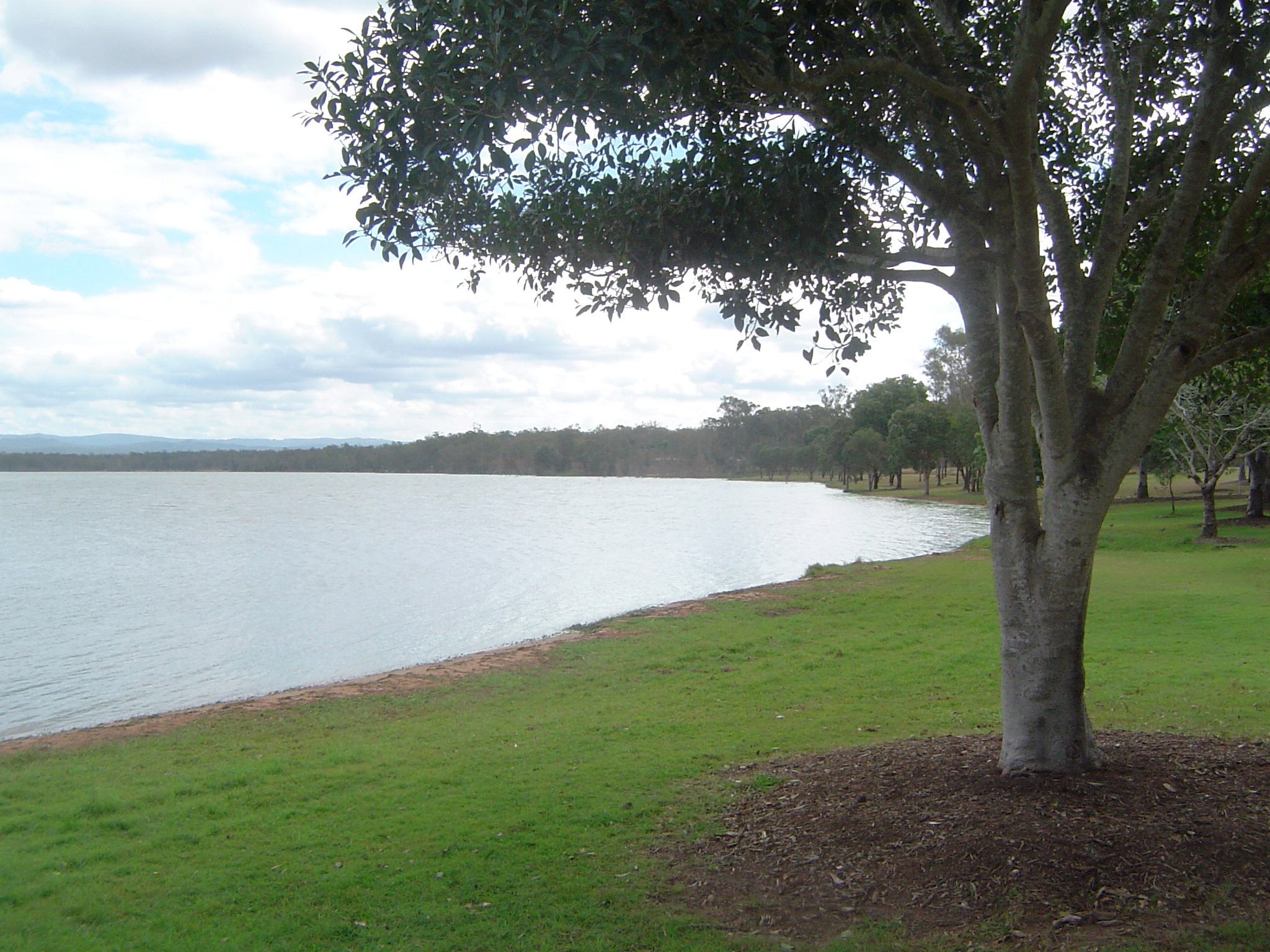
- The shores of Lake Atkinson, 2011

- Interactive map of Atkinsons Dam
- Coordinates: 27.4319°S 152.4511°E
- Country: Australia
- State: Queensland
- LGA: Somerset Region
- Location: 19.1 km (11.9 mi) NW of Lowood; 31.6 km (19.6 mi) S of Esk; 48.5 km (30.1 mi) NW of Ipswich; 88.4 km (54.9 mi) WNW of Brisbane

Government
  - State electorate: Nanango
  - Federal division: Blair

Area
  - Total: 26.7 km^{2} (10.3 sq mi)

Population
  - Total: 191 (2021 census)
  - Density: 7.15/km^{2} (18.53/sq mi)
- Time zone: UTC+10:00 (AEST)
- Postcode: 4311
Suburbs around Atkinsons Dam
Buaraba	Coominya	Coominya
Churchable	Atkinsons Dam	Clarendon
Churchable	Lockyer Waters	Mount Tarampa

Atkinsons Dam is a rural locality in the Somerset Region, Queensland, Australia. In the 2021 census, Atkinsons Dam had a population of 191 people.

== Geography ==
Atkinson Dam occupies most of the locality.

The northern boundary of the locality is marked by Buaraba Creek, a tributary of Lockyer Creek.

== History ==
Atkinson's Lagoon Provisional School opened on 6 August 1885. On 1 January 1909, it was upgraded to a State School. It closed in 1968. It was located near the intersection of the south-west corner of the present Atkinsons Dam Road and Rocky Creek Road (27.4144°S 152.4300°E).

== Demographics ==
In the 2016 census Atkinsons Dam had a population of 205 people.

In the 2021 census, Atkinsons Dam had a population of 191 people.

== Education ==
There are no schools in Atkinsons Dam. The nearest government primary schools are Coominya State School in neighbouring Coominya to the north-east, Mount Tarampa State School in Mount Tarampa to the south-east, and Kentville State School in Kentville to the south. The nearest government secondary school is Lowood State High School in Lowood to the south-east.

== Amenities ==
Atkinson Dam Park is on the northern side of the Atkison Lagoon (27.4211°S 152.44966°E). There is a boat ramp off Atkinson Dam Road into the lake (27.4206°S 152.4490°E), which is managed by the South East Queensland Water Corporation.
