= Wivenhoe Hill, Queensland =

Wivenhoe Hill
- Suburb
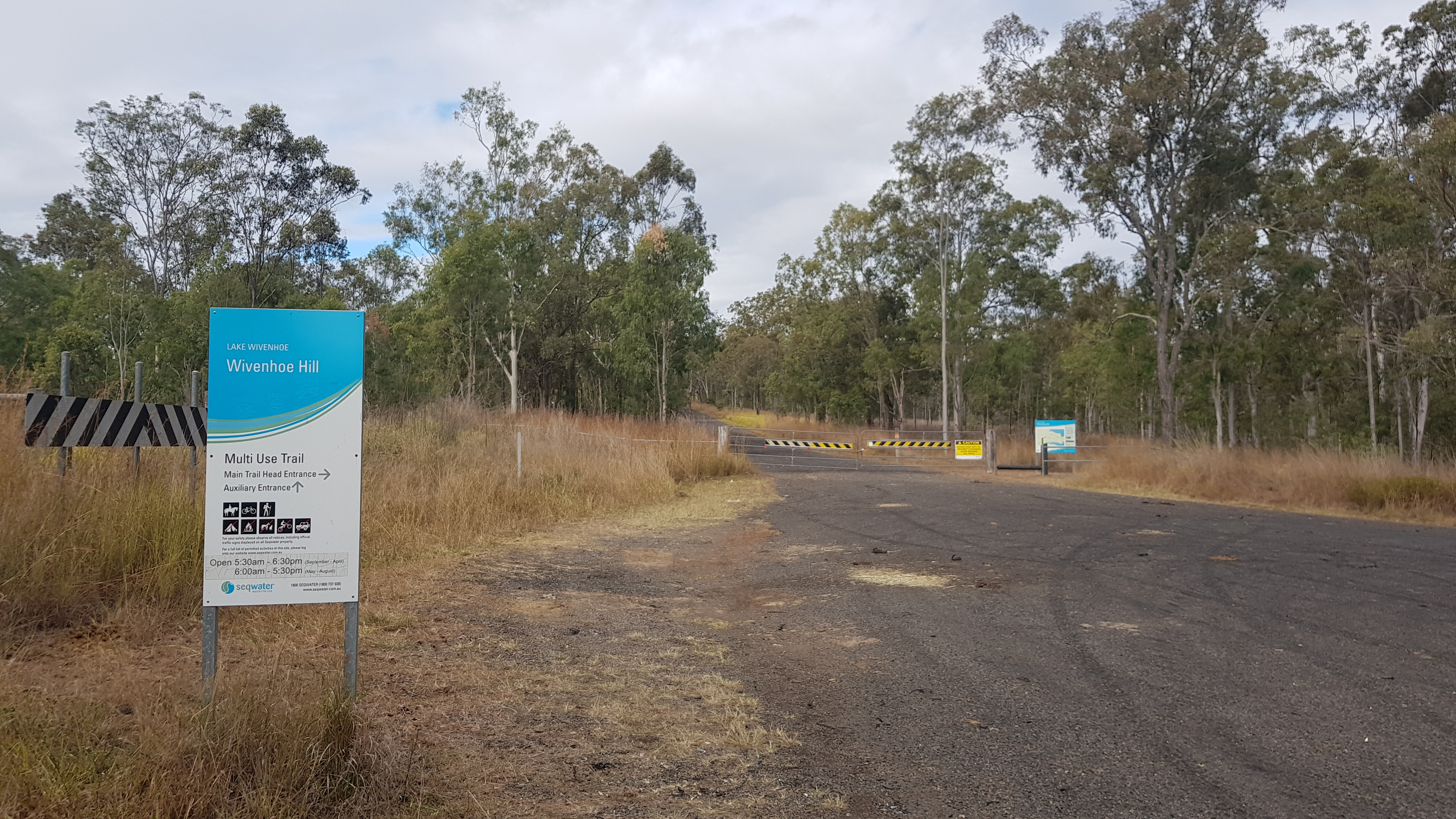
- Fig Tree Road, 2023

- Interactive map of Wivenhoe Hill
- Coordinates: 27.3652°S 152.5677°E
- Country: Australia
- State: Queensland
- LGA: Somerset Region
- Location: 17.9 km (11.1 mi) N of Lowood; 22.8 km (14.2 mi) SE of Esk; 41.3 km (25.7 mi) NNW of Ipswich; 75.5 km (46.9 mi) WNW of Brisbane

Government
  - State electorate: Nanango
  - Federal division: Blair

Area
  - Total: 16.6 km^{2} (6.4 sq mi)

Population
  - Total: 0 (2021 census)
  - Density: 0.000/km^{2} (0.00/sq mi)
- Time zone: UTC+10:00 (AEST)
- Postcode: 4311
Suburbs around Wivenhoe Hill
Lake Wivenhoe	Lake Wivenhoe	Lake Wivenhoe
Coominya	Wivenhoe Hill	Lake Wivenhoe
Coominya	Coominya	Patrick Estate

Wivenhoe Hill is a rural locality in the Somerset Region, Queensland, Australia. In the 2021 census, Wivenhoe Hill had "no people or a very low population".

== Geography ==
The locality is beside Lake Wivenhoe, the impoundment created by the Wivenhoe Dam over the Brisbane River. As the name suggests, the locality is hilly with two named peaks:

- Pine Hill (27.3678°S 152.5919°E) 216 metres (709 ft) above sea level
- Wivenhoe Hill (also known as Bigges Hill) (27.3751°S 152.5858°E) 188 metres (617 ft)

For comparison the shoreline of the lake is 60 to 70 metres (200 to 230 ft) above sea level depending on water levels in the dam. Although the locality is very close to the lake, the shoreline of the lake and the lake itself are within the locality of Lake Wivenhoe.

The Brisbane Valley Highway passes from the very south-east of the locality to the south-west (Coominya). There are only a few roads in the locality; Logan Inlet Road provides access down to the lake shores for camping and recreational use.

The principal land use in the locality is cattle grazing.

== History ==
The locality takes its name from the hill (27.3742°S 152.5780556°E) which in turn was named after a pastoral station operated by Edmund Blucher Uhr circa 1844, which in turn was named after Wivenhoe, a village in Essex, England. The hill is also called Bigges Hill after pastoralist and politician Francis Edward Bigge who operated the Mount Brisbane pastoral run in the district.

The Wivenhoe pastoral station was historically beside the Brisbane River, but after the construction of Wivenhoe Dam across the river (opened 1984), the locality is now adjacent to Lake Wivenhoe.

== Demographics ==
In the 2016 census, Wivenhoe Hill had a population of 9 people.

In the 2021 census, Wivenhoe Hill had "no people or a very low population".

== Education ==
There are no schools in Wivenhoe Hill. The nearest government primary schools are Coominya State School in neighbouring Coominya to the south-west and Patrick Estate State School in neighbouring Patrick Estate to the south-east. The nearest government secondary school is Lowood State High School in Lowood to the south.

== Attractions ==
The Logan Inlet day-use area offers swimming, boating, fishing and picnic facilities on the shores of Lake Wivehoe. There are two campsites: Captain Logan camp ground and Lumley Hill camp ground.
