= Coominya, Queensland =

Coominya
- Town
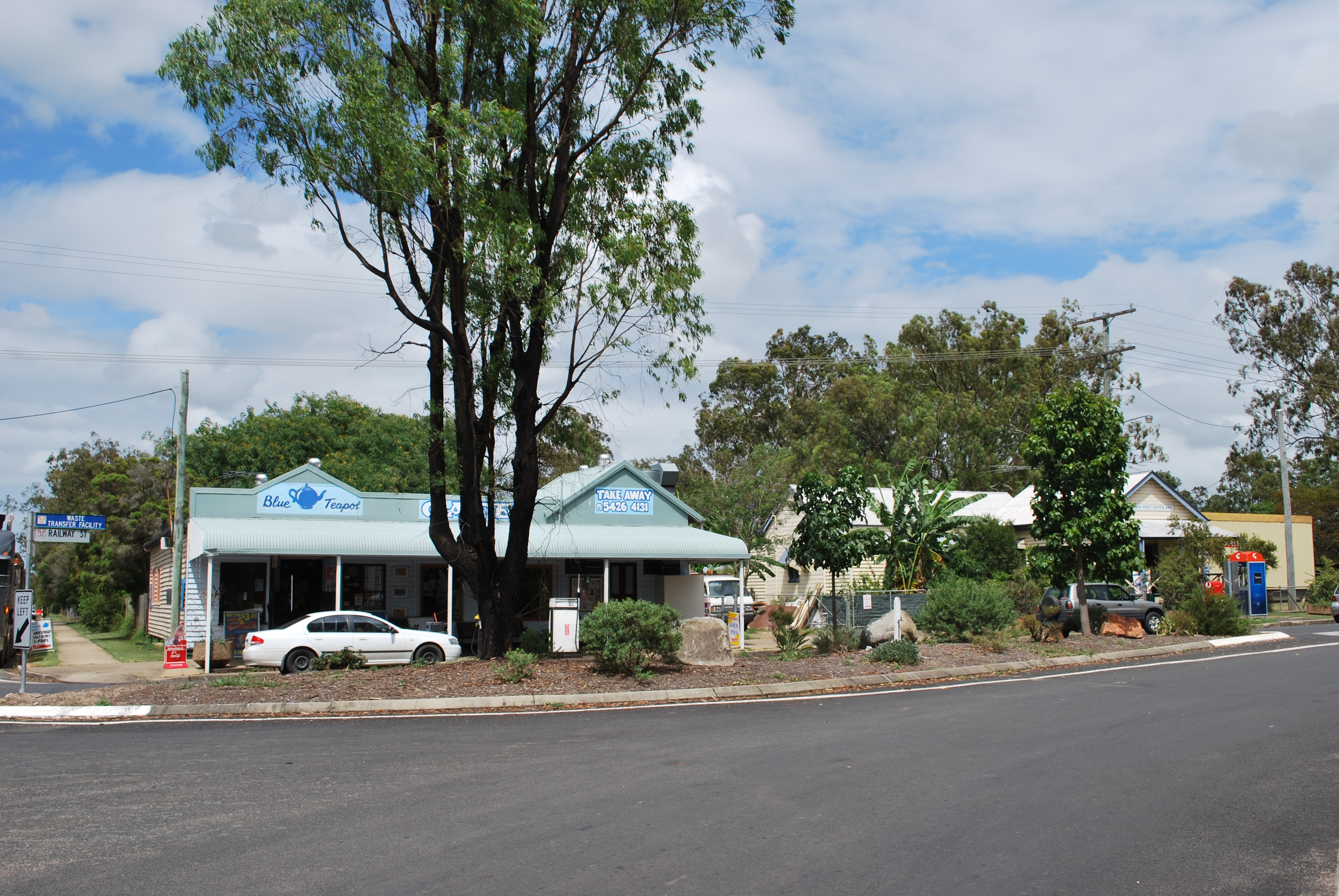
- Cafe and post office at Coominya

- Interactive map of Coominya
- Coordinates: 27.3919°S 152.5022°E
- Country: Australia
- State: Queensland
- LGA: Somerset Region
- Location: 15.9 km (9.9 mi) NW of Lowood; 26.3 km (16.3 mi) SSE of Esk; 46.4 km (28.8 mi) NW of Ipswich; 70.3 km (43.7 mi) ENE of Toowoomba; 83.9 km (52.1 mi) WNW of Brisbane

Government
  - State electorate: Nanango
  - Federal division: Blair

Area
  - Total: 114.7 km^{2} (44.3 sq mi)
- Elevation: 80 m (260 ft)

Population
  - Total: 1,029 (2021 census)
  - Density: 8.971/km^{2} (23.235/sq mi)
- Time zone: UTC+10:00 (AEST)
- Postcode: 4311
- County: Cavendish
- Parish: Esk
Localities around Coominya
Mount Hallen	Moombra	Lake Wivenhoe
Buaraba	Coominya	Wivenhoe Hill
Atkinsons Dam	Clarendon	Patrick Estate

Coominya is a rural town and locality in the Somerset Region in South East Queensland, Australia. The town is located 83 kilometres (52 mi) west of the state capital, Brisbane and approximately 2 kilometres (1.2 mi) from Wivenhoe Dam. In the 2021 census, the locality of Coominya had a population of 1,029 people.

Coominya sits on the land of the Indigenous Jagera people.

== Geography ==
Coominya is bounded by Logan Creek to the north and Buaraba Creek to the south. Although located closely between Atkinson Dam to the south-west and Lake Wivenhoe to the north-east, it does not bound either of these two reservoirs.

The Brisbane Valley Highway approximately follows its north-east border. The Brisbane Valley railway line passes through Coominya from the north-west to the south-east with the Coominya railway station serving the town. However, the railway line was closed in 1993.

== History ==
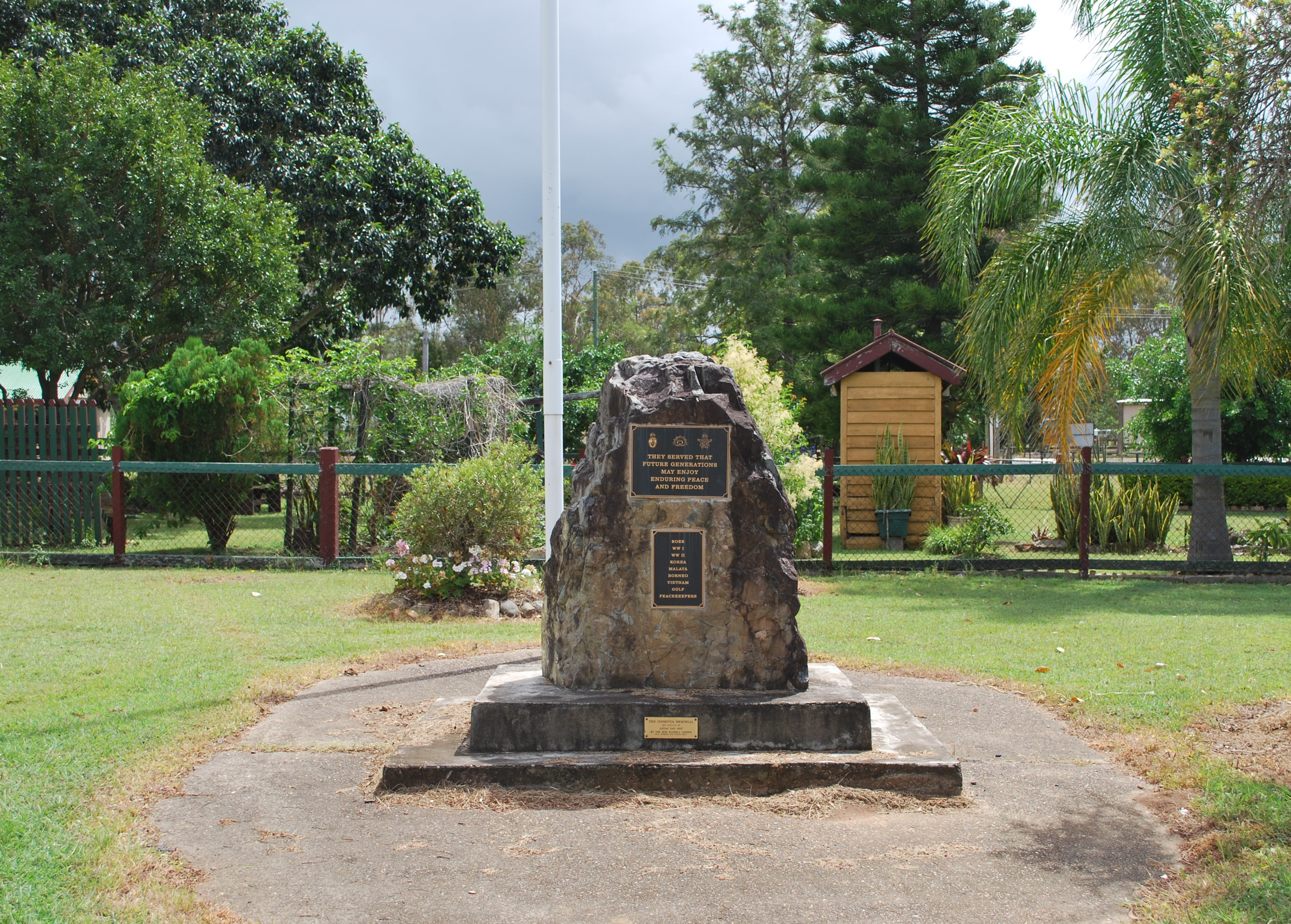
Coominya War Memorial, 2010

From 1886 to 1906, the area was known as Bellevue (the local pastoral property). The name Coominya is believed to be derived from the Yuggera language where kung means water and nya means to see referring to its lagoons.

Coominya Post Office opened by December 1907 (a receiving office had been open from 1887, known earlier as Bellevue).

Coominya State School opened on 17 September 1912.

In 1920, the Coominya soldier settlement was established to provide opportunities for soldiers returning from World War I to establish themselves as farmers. There were 100 farms each of 30 acres (12 ha) intended for growing grapes and fruit. Like many soldier settlements in Australia, the scheme failed due to the poor quality of the land and lack of support for inexperienced farmers. The settlement closed in 1929 with only 2 farms were still operating.

Coominya Presbyterian Church was officially opened on Thursday 4 March 1920 by Reverend J. B. Galloway, Moderator of the Presbyterian Church. It was the first church to open in Coominya.

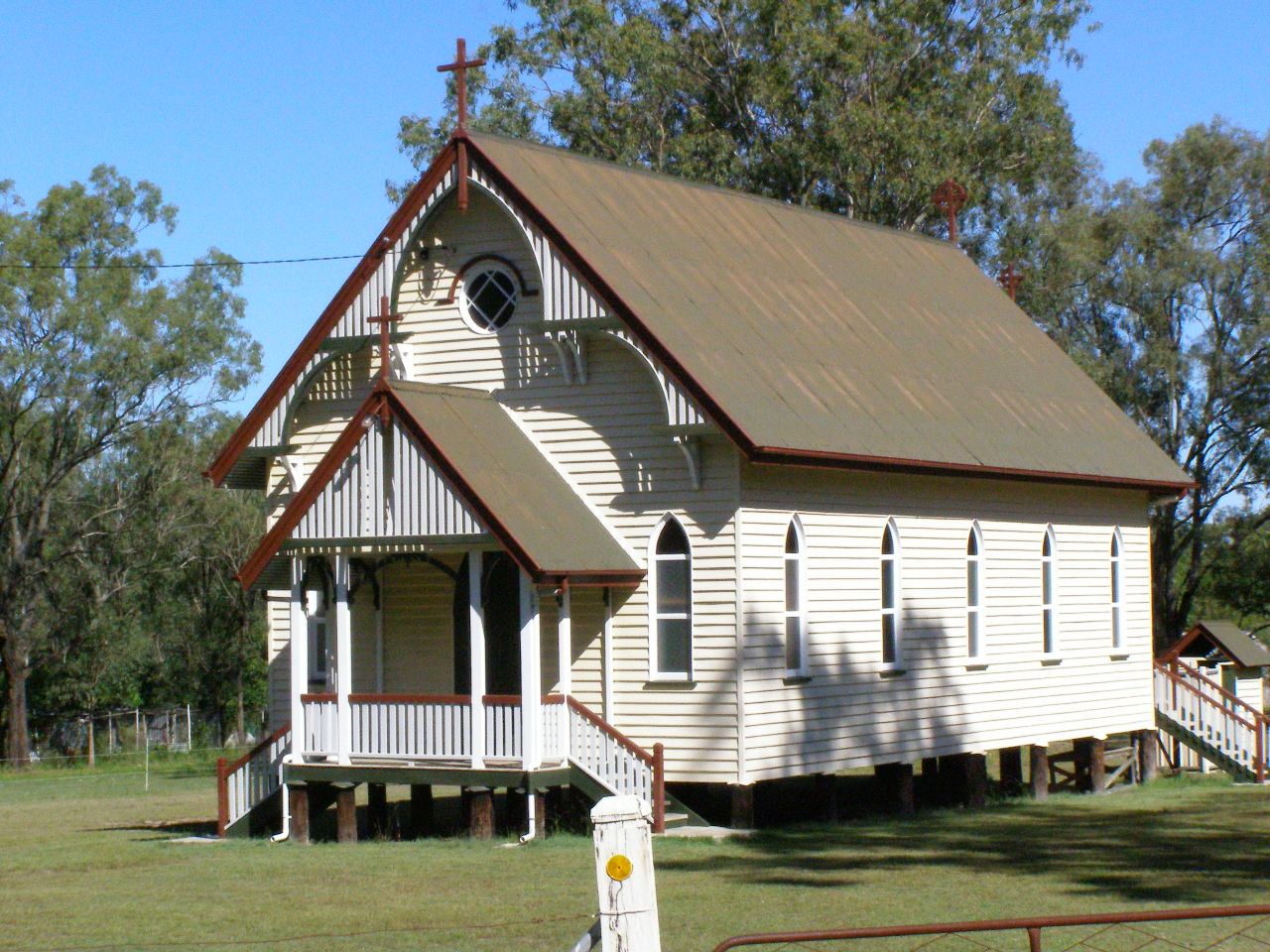
St Francis Xavier Catholic Church, 2006

On Sunday 21 November 1920, Monsignor James Byrne laid the foundation stone for a Catholic church in Coominya. It had been planned that Archbishop James Duhig was to lay the foundation stone, but he was unable to come on the day. John Newman donated the land for the church and also £300 worth of timber. On Sunday 6 March 1921, Duhig came to Cominya to bless and dedicate the new Catholic church. The new church was 55 by 24 feet (16.8 by 7.3 m) including a 9-by-15-foot (2.7 by 4.6 m) sacristy. The builder was Mr C. J. Madden, assisted by Messrs J. and H. Madden.

During World War II, an airfield was constructed west of Coominya to accommodate US air force squadrons. Today, the airfield is being used by a flight training school.

St. Martin's Anglican Church was dedicated on 24 June 1922 by Coadjutor Bishop Henry Le Fanu. It closed circa 2005.

The Coominya War Memorial is located on Railway Street and was dedicated on 25 April 1997.

In October 2025, the Coominya Catholic Church building was relocated to become the chapel at Sophia College in Plainland.

== Demographics ==
In the 2006 census, the locality of Coominya had a population of 1,751.

In the 2011 census, the locality of Coominya had a population of 1,174.

In the 2016 census, the locality of Coominya had a population of 1,200 people.

In the 2021 census, Coominya had a population of 1,029 people.

== Heritage listings ==
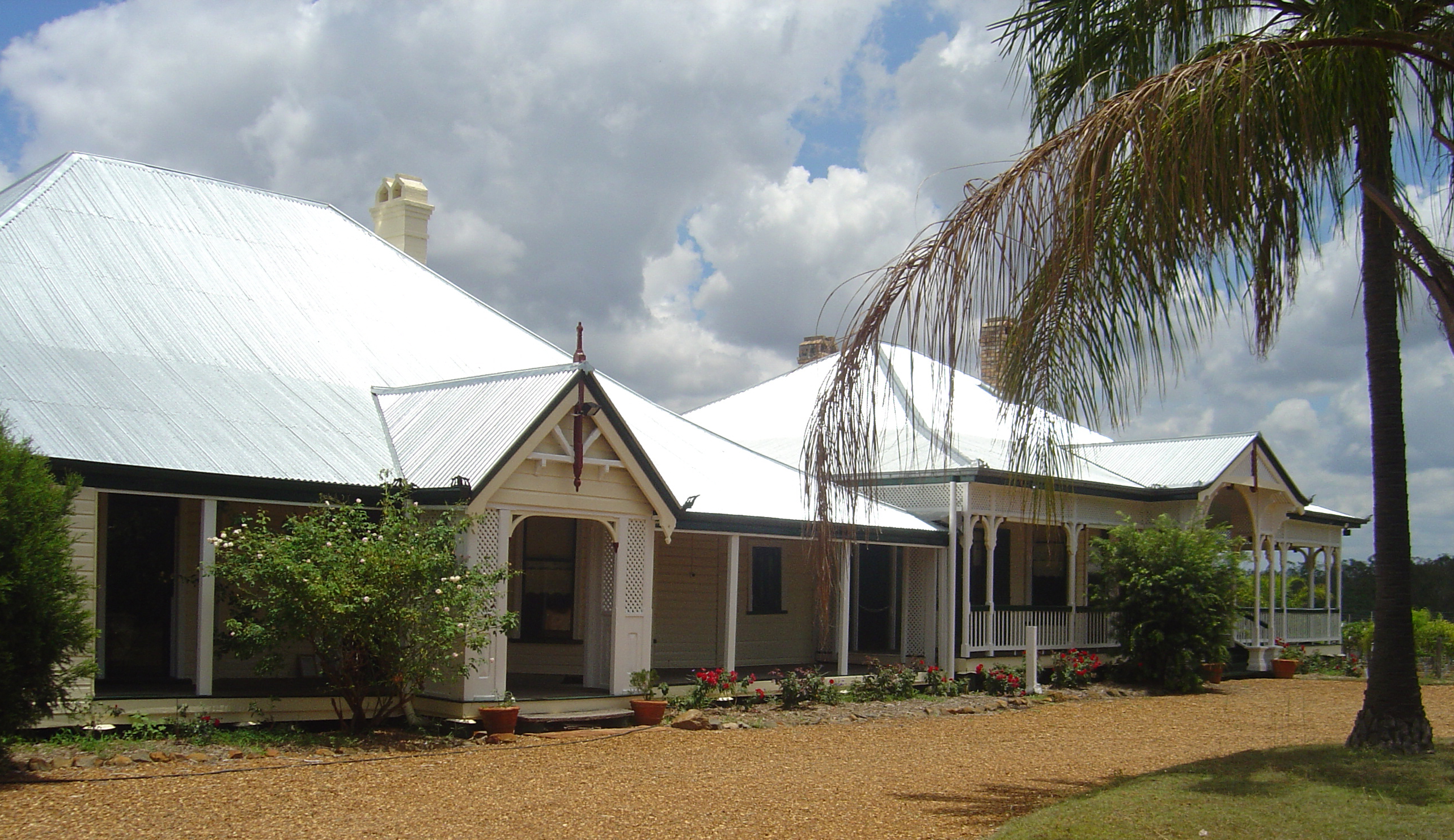
Bellevue Homestead

Coominya has a number of heritage-listed sites, including:

- Bellevue Homestead

== Economy ==
Coominya is known for its fresh produce.

The major employer is an abattoir. There is a steady increase in olive growing and Comvita have set up an olive leaf extract plant in the town.

== Education ==
Coominya State School is a government primary (Prep–6) school for boys and girls at 7 Cornhill Street (27.3922°S 152.5008°E). In 2017, the school had an enrolment of 118 students with 7 teachers (6 full-time equivalent) and 6 non-teaching staff (4 full-time equivalent).

There are no secondary schools in Coominya. The nearest government secondary schools are Lowood State High School in Lowood and Toogoolawah State High School in Toogoolawah.

== Amenities ==
Facilities in Coominya include a post office, a general store with newsagency, a cafe and a pub.

A flight training school operates at Coominya Airfield, ICAO code YBCM.

There are a number of churches in Coominya, including:

- St Francis Xavier Catholic Church, 453 Coominya Connection Road (27.39398°S 152.49921°E)
- Coominya Presbyterian Church (also known as Central Church Coominya), 18–20 West Street (27.39110°S 152.50495°E)

== Attractions ==
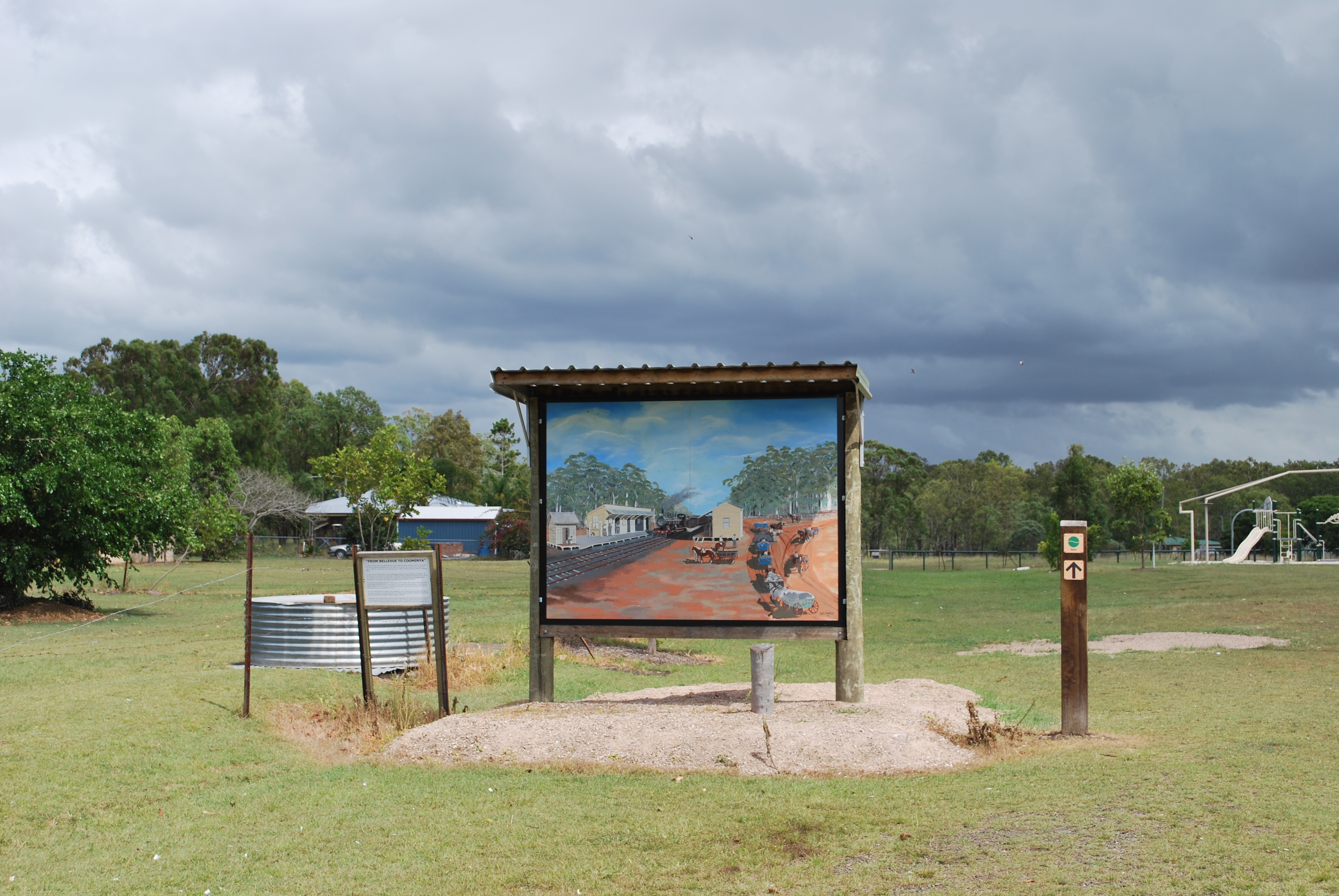
Town mural

Attractions in the Coominya area include the historic Bellevue Homestead, moved from Wivenhoe Dam to Coominya.

Coominya is known for its scenery and wildlife including lorikeet parrots, koalas, kangaroos.

As part of Q150 (Queensland's 150th anniversary) the local heritage society commissioned a series of murals depicting early life at the town.
