= Morton Vale, Queensland =

Morton Vale
- Suburb
- Interactive map of Morton Vale
- Coordinates: 27.4852°S 152.3833°E
- Country: Australia
- State: Queensland
- LGA: Lockyer Valley Region
- Location: 16.5 km (10.3 mi) NW of Gatton; 51.3 km (31.9 mi) E of Toowoomba; 53.3 km (33.1 mi) WNW of Ipswich; 90.5 km (56.2 mi) W of Brisbane

Government
  - State electorate: Lockyer
  - Federal division: Wright

Area
  - Total: 15.2 km^{2} (5.9 sq mi)
- Elevation: 80 m (260 ft)

Population
  - Total: 114 (2021 census)
  - Density: 7.50/km^{2} (19.42/sq mi)
- Time zone: UTC+10:00 (AEST)
- Postcode: 4343
Suburbs around Morton Vale
Spring Creek	Lockyer Waters	Lockyer Waters
Spring Creek	Morton Vale	Kentville
Lake Clarendon	Lake Clarendon	Glenore Grove

Morton Vale is a rural locality in the Lockyer Valley Region, Queensland, Australia. In the 2021 census, Morton Vale had a population of 114 people.

== Geography ==
The locality is bounded to west by Main Green Swamp Road, to east partly by Nangara Road and Lyne Road, and to the south partly by Lake Clarendon Road.

Green Swamp is a wetland in the north-west of the locality (27.4699°S 152.3712°E).

The land is relatively flat, approximately 80 metres (260 ft) above sea level. The land use is irrigated crop growing in the south-east of the locality with the rest of the locality mostly used for grazing on native vegetation.

== History ==
The locality is believed to be named after a local farmer George Morton who leased land in the area in 1904.

Lake Clarendon Lower State School opened on 9 March 1914 but was renamed Morton Vale State School within a few months of opening. It closed on 11 December 1981. The school was at 10 Morton Vale School Road (27.5005°S 152.39084°E). As at January 2021, the school building is still standing.

== Demographics ==
In the 2016 census, Morton Vale had a population of 143 people.

In the 2021 census, Morton Vale had a population of 114 people.

== Education ==
There are no schools in Morton Vale. The nearest government primary schools are Kentville State School in neighbouring Kentville to the east, Glenore Grove State School in neighbouring Glenore Grove to the south-east and Lake Clarendon State School in Lake Clarendon to the south-west. The nearest government secondary school is Lockyer District State High School in Gatton to the south-west.
