= Coominya railway station =

Railway station in Queensland, Australia

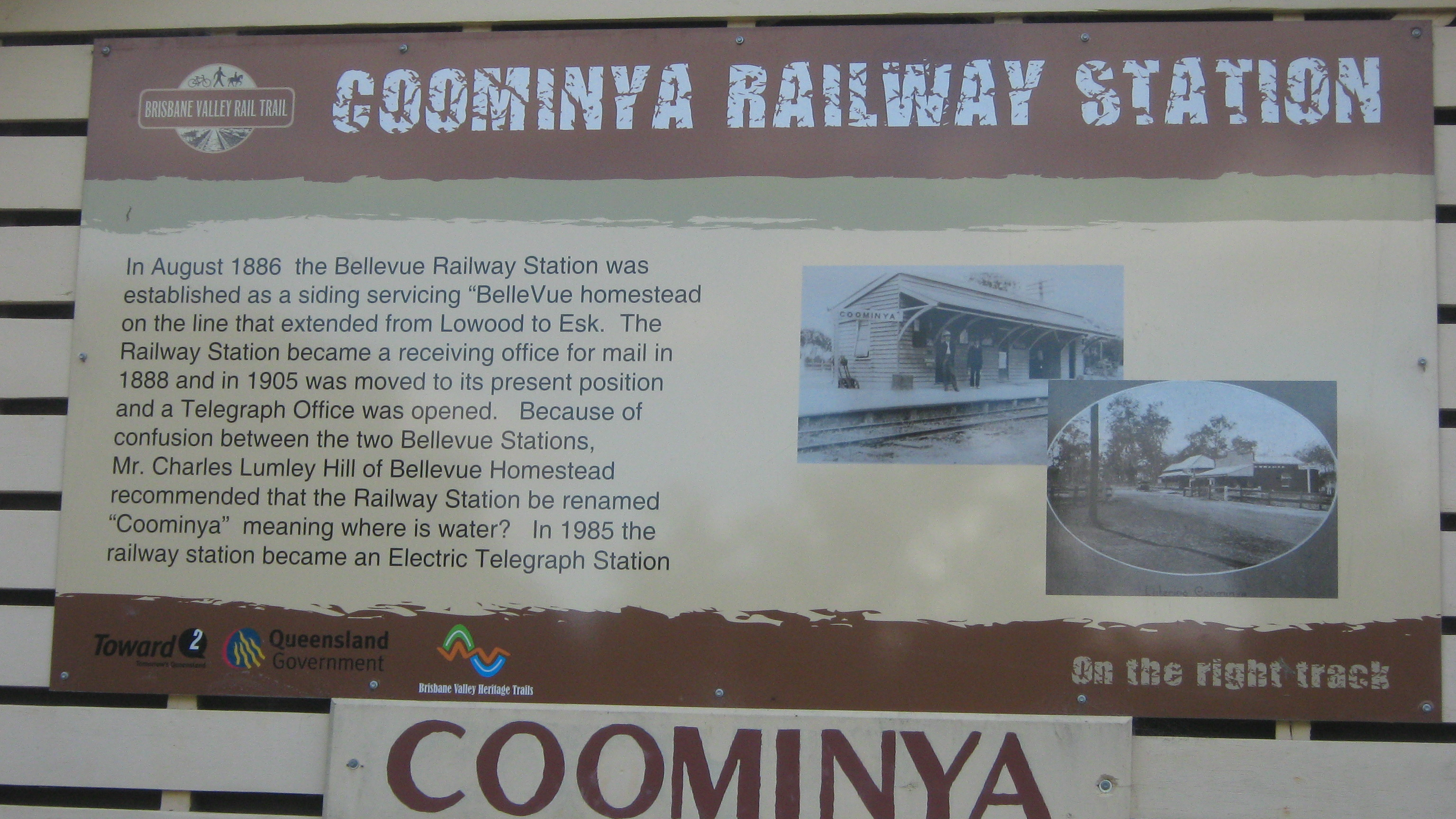
- Coominya railway station, 2011

General information
- Location: Coominya, Australia
- Coordinates: 27.3903°S 152.5020°E
- System: regional rail
- Line: Brisbane Valley
- Tracks: Single

History
- Opened: 1886
- Closed: 1988
Location

Coominya railway station is central to all activities in historic Coominya village, located in the Somerset Region of South East Queensland, Australia.

Coominya village, a township of approximately 467 persons is located in South East Queensland approximately 83 kilometres (52 miles) west of Brisbane, Queensland’s capital city, in Australia. Coominya village which is approximately two km from Wivenhoe Dam can be accessed by road from the Brisbane Valley Highway which crosses the wall of the Dam further south. The completion of the construction of Wivenhoe Dam took place in 1985. Its purpose was as a flood mitigation and water storage measure. It also supplies drinking water to Brisbane and local regions. However, Coominya village and its historic buildings, such as the old railway station, are still dependent on tank water.

Coominya railway siding came into being on 9 August 1886 and became known as 'Bellevue'. This occurred when the section of the Brisbane Valley railway line from Lowood to Esk which passed through Coominya was officially opened. The original goods platform siding was established over the rise, east of its current site, at the entrance to ‘Bellevue Station’, the cattle selection.

However, it was difficult for trains to start uphill and the siding was relocated to a more level site where it remains to this day. In 1887, it became a mail receiving station to complement Bellevue Station which was also a receiving station. A goods shed was built in 1891.

In 1895, Bellevue became an electric telegraph station. The increased demand for services over the following ten years resulted in a name change for the railway station. It has been suggested that there may have been confusion between mail recipients of Bellevue (the railway station) and Bellevue Station (the cattle selection).

In 1905, Mr Lumley Hill, the proprietor of Bellevue Station suggested the name ‘Coominya’ for the rail siding. Indigenous Yugarabul dialect was probably spoken in the district and ‘Coominya’ a derivation of this dialect. According to Mr Lumley Hill it meant ‘I see water’. However, as most of the visible water around Coominya is formed in man-made landscapes it has been suggested that swamps towards Clarendon may have been the water spoken of. There is a natural swampy area south of Coominya which may be the area referred to in the records.

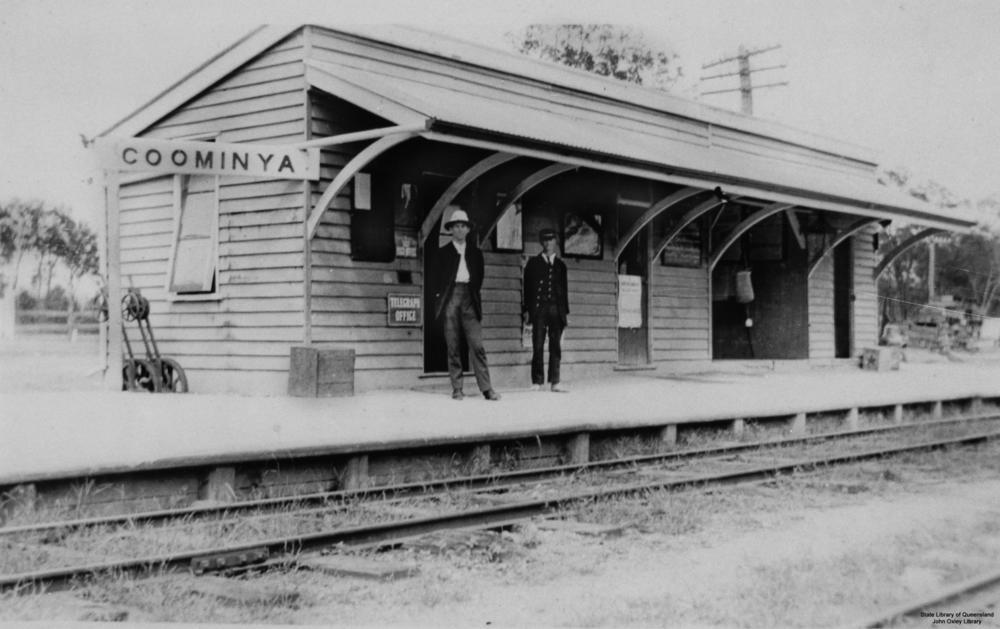
Railway Station and Telegraph Office at Coominya

Railways in rural Queensland extended as settlers cleared land and produced crops. Coominya settlers grew corn (maize), pumpkins and potatoes. Formerly transported via horse and German wagons, farm produce from Coominya districts such as Buaraba and Tarampa, found its way into the nearby city of Ipswich. Coominya siding provided means of transport for these goods in large quantities and enabled selectors to receive necessities for the production of their crops.

In 1885, R Wilson & Co had been contracted to construct eight gatekeepers' and one porter cottages. The township grew and soon the need for an hotel became evident. Bellevue Hotel was built diagonally opposite the railway siding in 1903. Hoffman Brothers of Rosewood constructed the hotel and licensees were Mr Noble, Fred Webb, Jim McKeirnan and Jim Fitzpatrick.

Other industries, dependent on rail transport, thrived in and around Coominya during the first three quarters of the 20th century. These included the timber industry, wine production, and cattle. However, little of these industries remain excepting for an abattoir. The steam train ceased passing through Coominya in 1969 and in 1988 the rail motor service came to an end. The tracks were removed from 1993 onwards.

In 2012, the Brisbane Valley railway track exists as a rail trail that encourages horse riding, bicycle riding, and foot slogging. Donkey owners from Coominya travelled the Lowood to Fernvale connection in June 2011.

As far as transportation of organic olives, pumpkins, melons, potatoes, tomatoes, garlic, Asian and other vegetable farm produce goes, this area once again depends on road transport. Time has gone the full circle. Some farmers choose to use older methods of farming and reliable older machinery.

The old Coominya railway station still stands and is central to markets, the circus, and community events. Coominya resident, Mr Fred Banff of historic Clinton Homestead, wanted the community and tourists to commemorate history. Hence, a series of murals form a public art scape around the old railway station. The first of several murals was unveiled in 2007. Each portrays an historic legend. The official unveiling of the railway mural occurred in December 2009 and was considered to be a 150th birthday gift to the State of Queensland.

== See also ==
- Rail transport in Queensland
