= Spring Creek, Queensland (Lockyer Valley Region) =

Spring Creek
- Suburb
- Interactive map of Spring Creek
- Coordinates: 27.4416°S 152.3219°E
- Country: Australia
- State: Queensland
- LGA: Lockyer Valley Region
- Location: 17.5 km (10.9 mi) NNE of Gatton; 53.4 km (33.2 mi) ENE of Toowoomba CBD; 64.4 km (40.0 mi) WNW of Ipswich; 101 km (63 mi) W of Brisbane

Government
  - State electorate: Lockyer
  - Federal division: Wright

Area
  - Total: 45.1 km^{2} (17.4 sq mi)

Population
  - Total: 494 (2021 census)
  - Density: 10.953/km^{2} (28.37/sq mi)
- Time zone: UTC+10:00 (AEST)
- Postcode: 4343
Suburbs around Spring Creek
Buaraba	Buaraba	Churchable
Vinegar Hill	Spring Creek	Lockyer Waters
Adare	Lake Clarendon	Morton Vale

Spring Creek is a rural locality in the Lockyer Valley Region, Queensland, Australia. In the 2021 census, Spring Creek had a population of 494 people.

== History ==
Clarendon Provisional School opened circa 1882. In 1903, it was renamed Springdale Provisional School. It became Springdale State School on 1 January 1909, but closed later in 1909. Its precise location is not known but it was in the vicinity of the intersection of (present day) Adare, Lake Clarendon and Spring Creek.

Southern Queensland Correctional Centre opened in January 2012.

== Demographics ==
In the 2016 census, Spring Creek had a population of 601 people.

In the 2021 census, Spring Creek had a population of 494 people.

== Education ==
There are no schools in Spring Creek. The nearest government primary school is Lake Claredon State School in neighbouring Lake Clarendon to the south. The nearest government secondary school is Lockyer District State High School in Gatton to the south.

== Facilities ==
Southern Queensland Correctional Centre is a 300-bed high security prison in Millers Road (27.4701°S 152.3069°E).
