= Mount Hallen, Queensland =

Mount Hallen
- Suburb
- Interactive map of Mount Hallen
- Coordinates: 27.3319°S 152.3844°E
- Country: Australia
- State: Queensland
- LGA: Somerset Region
- Location: 12.4 km (7.7 mi) SSW of Esk; 29.6 km (18.4 mi) NW of Lowood; 30.6 km (19.0 mi) S of Toogoolawah; 32.7 km (20.3 mi) NNE of Gatton; 97.7 km (60.7 mi) WNW of Brisbane

Government
  - State electorate: Nanango
  - Federal division: Blair

Area
  - Total: 52.5 km^{2} (20.3 sq mi)
- Elevation: 80–390 m (260–1,280 ft)

Population
  - Total: 457 (2021 census)
  - Density: 8.705/km^{2} (22.55/sq mi)
- Time zone: UTC+10:00 (AEST)
- Postcode: 4312
Suburbs around Mount Hallen
Redbank Creek	Esk	Esk
Redbank Creek	Mount Hallen	Moombra
Buaraba	Buaraba	Coominya

Mount Hallen is a rural locality in the Somerset Region, Queensland, Australia. In the 2021 census, Mount Hallen had a population of 457 people.

== Geography ==
The locality is bounded to the south by Running Creek.

The mountain Mount Hallen is in the east of the locality (27.3318°S 152.4129°E) and rises to 390 metres (1,280 ft).

The Gatton Esk Road enters the locality from the south (Buaraba) and exits to the north (Esk).

There are a variety of land uses within the locality. There is rural residential housing in the south-west of the locality. Other land uses include grazing on native vegetation, production forestry, and some crop growing.

== History ==
The mountain Mount Hallen was named in 1829 by explorer Allan Cunningham, probably after Ambrose Hallen, who was the Assistant Surveyor-General in New South Wales from 1827 to 1829.

The section of the Brisbane Valley railway line from Lowood to Esk opened on Monday 9 August 1886. It included the Mount Hallen railway station (27.3164°S 152.4091°E) at Mount Hallen. The station was originally to be called Buaraba (the name of the parish) but was renamed Mount Hallen after the mountain. The locality takes its name from the railway station name. The locality to the south of Mount Hallen is now named Buaraba.

The railway line and Mount Hallen railway station closed in 1993.

== Demographics ==
In the 2016 census, Mount Hallen had a population of 458 people.

In the 2021 census, Mount Hallen had a population of 457 people.

== Education ==
There are no schools in Mount Hallen. The nearest government primary schools are Esk State School in neighbouring Esk to the north and Coominya State School in neighbouring Coominya to the south-east. The nearest government secondary schools are Toogoolawah State High School in Toogoolawah to the north, Lowood State High School in Lowood to the south-east, and Lockyer District State High School in Gatton to the south-west.

== Attractions ==
The Brisbane Valley Rail Trail now uses the former Brisbane Valley railway corridor.
