= Coominya Soldier Settlement =

Coominya Soldier Settlement was a soldier settlement in Coominya in the present-day Somerset Region local government area of South East Queensland, Australia. 100 soldiers settled in the settlement, each on approximately 30-acre (12 ha) blocks.

Approximately 3,000 acres of land was purchased from Messrs Robert, Samuel and William Watson on both sides of the Brisbane Valley railway line (Portions 94 to 141, Parish of Buaraba, and Portions 126 to 151 and 107 to 125, Parish of Wivenhoe). Part of the cattle station Bellevue (Portion 152 to 166, Parish of Wivenhoe) was also purchased and the total surveyed into 109 blocks of between 22 and 37 acres (8.9 and 15.0 ha) and opened for settlement on 1 June 1920.

Based on existing successful farms in the district, soldier settlers were encouraged to grow grapes and citrus trees. Each soldier was granted favourable terms to purchase land and equipment up to the value of £625 ($1,250). This covered the purchase of the land, a four roomed house, a horse and cart, a 6” hand plough, a hand scuffler, a single section harrow and citrus trees and grape cuttings.

A total of 83 houses were built, plus a project office, supervisor's residence, bulk stores and stables and a Bush Nurses cottage and dispensary. (The Bush Nurses’ cottage still exists next to the railway station.) The first overseer was Mr A E Murray followed by Mr Dean. The supervisor's residence still exists next to the campdraft grounds. At the close of the scheme three of the settlement houses were later moved to the Coominya township opposite the school and timber from settlement houses formed the basis of the original part of the public hall. Many of the other settlement houses were moved to Redcliffe by the Mayor of Redcliffe, Mr Wylie.

Although only started in 1920, the Coominya project ceased in 1924, when there were only two soldier settlers still on the land, Mr C Wills and Mr P Smith. Settlers were offered land in other settlement schemes such as Kingaroy, Ridgelands, Roma, Nanango, Cecil Plains, the Callide and Burnett valleys and the Atherton Tableland. The Coominya Soldier Settlement Scheme cost approximately £90,000, of which only approximately £10,000 was recovered. The State legislation was rescinded in 1929.

The causes of failure were ascribed to firstly the poor sandy soil selected for the farms, leading to a lack of response to fertilizers in many cases, lack of water, the inexperience of the settlers in farming methods, the delay in planting trees and vines due to the need to clear and fence the land first, the grapevine disease ‘Downy Mildew’ and poor prices for produce due to the start of the depression in the 1920s.

Although short lived, the soldier settlement had a profound effect on the development of Coominya because of the influx of over 80 families. Churches were built for each denomination, shops were built, the school was extended and an extra teacher was appointed and a Bush Nursing Centre was established.
