= Southern Queensland Correctional Centre =

Prison in Queensland, Australia

- Interactive map of Southern Queensland Correctional Centre
- Location: Millers Road, Spring Creek, Lockyer Valley Region, Queensland, Australia; 27.471821°S 152.302745°E
- Status: Operational
- Security class: Minimum to Maximum
- Capacity: 300
- Opened: January 2012
- Managed by: Queensland Corrective Services

The Southern Queensland Correctional Centre (SQCC) is an Australian prison facility located in Spring Creek, Lockyer Valley Region, 15 km north from Gatton, and 94 km west from Brisbane, Queensland. The 300-bed minimum to maximum security prison for females was built by Baulderstone and officially opened on 21 December 2011 by Corrective Services Minister Neil Roberts. The facilities began operation in January 2012. SQCC is the first completed stage of the Southern Queensland Correctional Precinct in Australia.

The centre provides secure placement accommodation for sentenced mainstream female prisoners classified as high or low security and has 104 secure and 196 residential beds. The facility is managed by Queensland Corrective Services. It cost A$485 million to construct. The prison contains 11 cell blocks. Each cell includes a TV, radio and bookshelves.

The centre was originally managed by Serco. In 2019, the Queensland government announced it would take control of administration of the prison, a transition that occurred between July 2020 and July 2021. The higher levels of assault, linked to lower levels of staff, was the primary reason for revoking the contract with Serco.

The prison also includes accommodation for aged and infirm prisoners in a residential unit and a medical centre providing palliative care. As of August 2020 it was announced that there would be a $653 million expansion of the facility that will add an additional 1000 bed capacity.

== See also ==
- List of Australian prisons
