= Glenore Grove, Queensland =

Glenore Grove
- Suburb
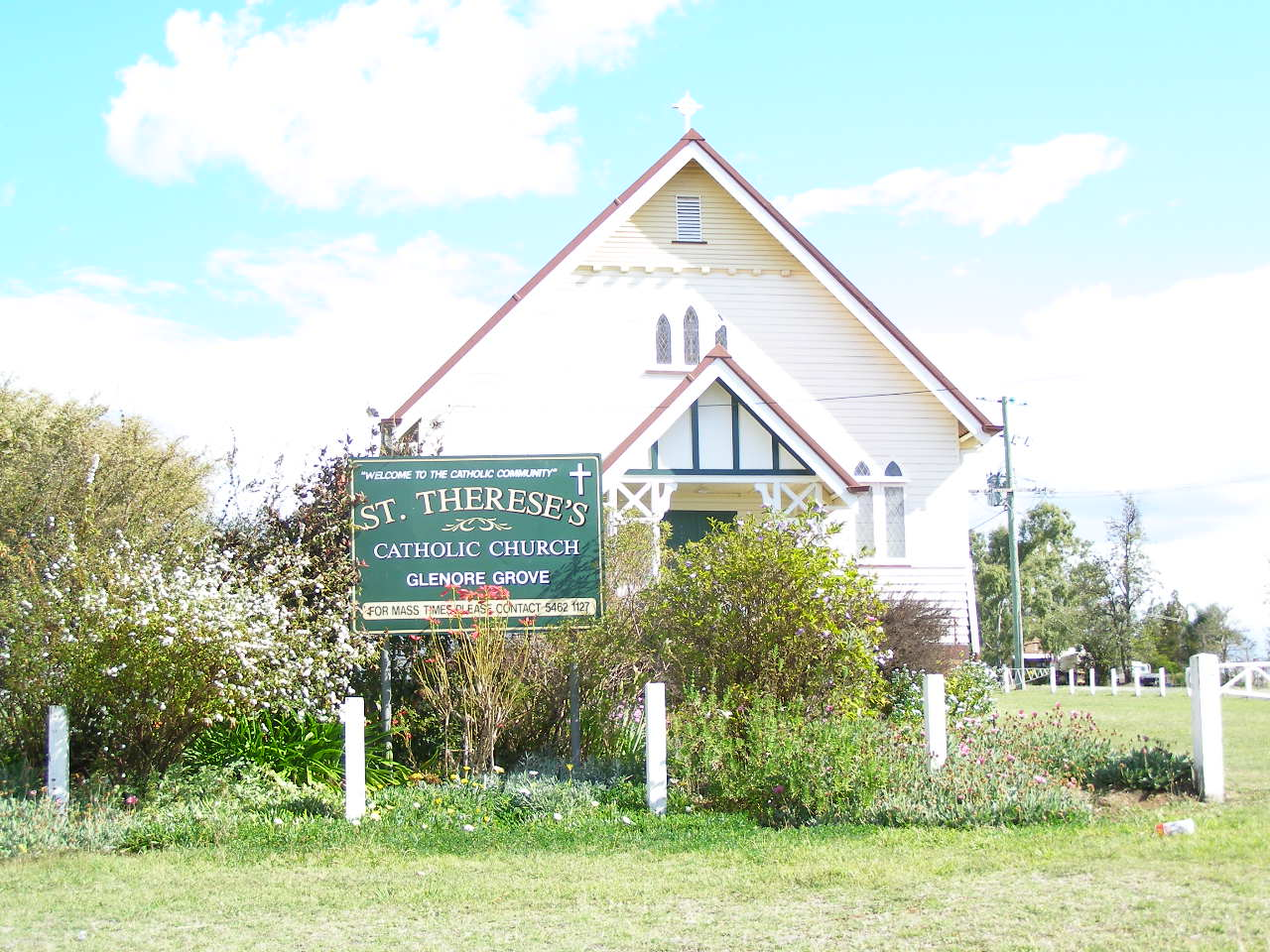
- St Therese's Catholic Church, 2006

- Interactive map of Glenore Grove
- Coordinates: 27.5216°S 152.4088°E
- Country: Australia
- State: Queensland
- LGA: Lockyer Valley Region
- Location: 13.4 km (8.3 mi) N of Laidley; 14.9 km (9.3 mi) E of Gatton; 44.5 km (27.7 mi) WNW of Ipswich; 82 km (51 mi) W of Brisbane CBD

Government
  - State electorate: Lockyer
  - Federal division: Wright

Area
  - Total: 27.4 km^{2} (10.6 sq mi)

Population
  - Total: 953 (2021 census)
  - Density: 34.78/km^{2} (90.08/sq mi)
- Time zone: UTC+10:00 (AEST)
- Postcode: 4342
Suburbs around Glenore Grove
Morton Vale	Kentville	Lockrose
Lake Clarendon	Glenore Grove	Regency Downs
Crowley Vale	Forest Hill	Plainland

Glenore Grove is a rural locality in the Lockyer Valley Region, Queensland, Australia. In the 2021 census, Glenore Grove had a population of 953 people.

== Geography ==
The Lockyer Creek forms part of the locality's western boundary. Its tributary Laidley Creek forms part of the locality's southwestern boundary with their confluence within the locality with Lockyer Creek exiting to the north-east of the locality, ultimately becoming a tributary of the Brisbane River which flows into Moreton Bay.

The locality is mostly flat freehold land (approx 70 metres above sea level) used for farming, mostly growing vegetables such as onions, beetroots, broccoli and pumpkin.

The Forest Hill Fernvale Road passes through the locality from south-west to northeast.

== History ==
Glenore Grove State School opened on 22 January 1906.

Glenore Grove was severely flooded during the 2011 Queensland floods with Lockyer Creek rising to 16 metres and again in the 2013 Queensland floods with helicopters needed to evacuate people from cut-off areas and rooftops.

== Demographics ==
In the 2016 census, Glenore Grove had a population of 883 people.

In the 2021 census, Glenore Grove had a population of 953 people.

== Education ==
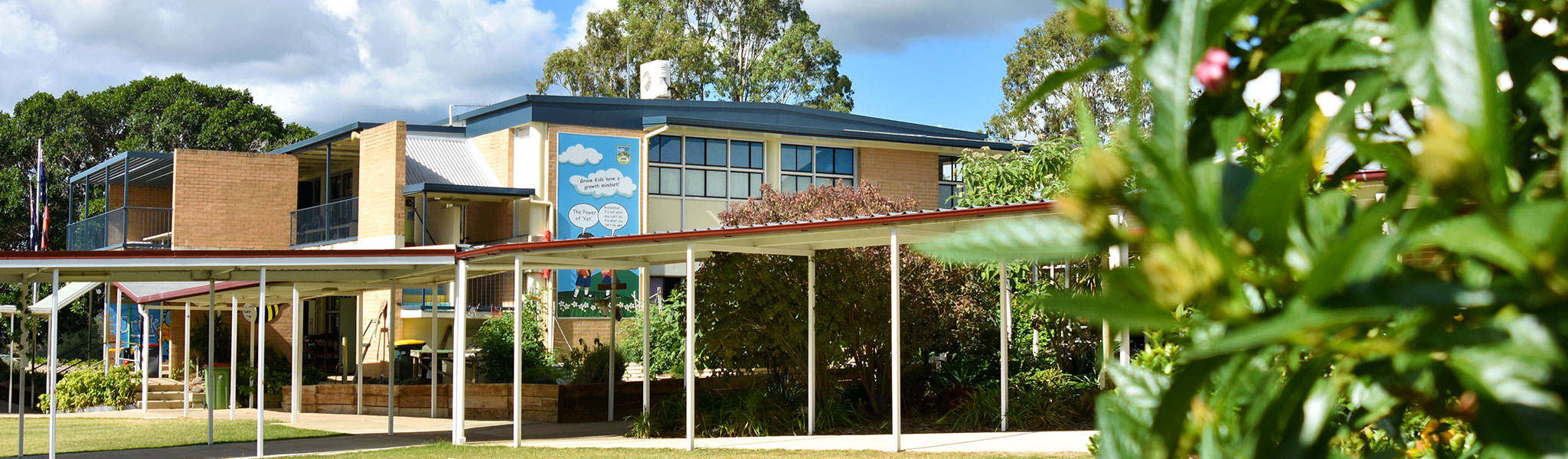
Glenore Grove State School, 2022

Glenore Grove State School is a government primary (Prep-6) school for boys and girls at 3 Brightview Road (27.5299°S 152.4080°E). In 2016, the school had an enrolment of 125 students with 10 teachers (7 full-time equivalent) and 9 non-teaching staff (6 full-time equivalent). In 2018, the school had an enrolment of 153 students with 11 teachers (9 full-time equivalent) and 10 non-teaching staff (6 full-time equivalent).

There are no secondary schools in Glenore Grove. The nearest government secondary schools are Lockyer District State High School in Gatton to the south-west and Laidley State High School in Laidley to the south.

== Amenities ==
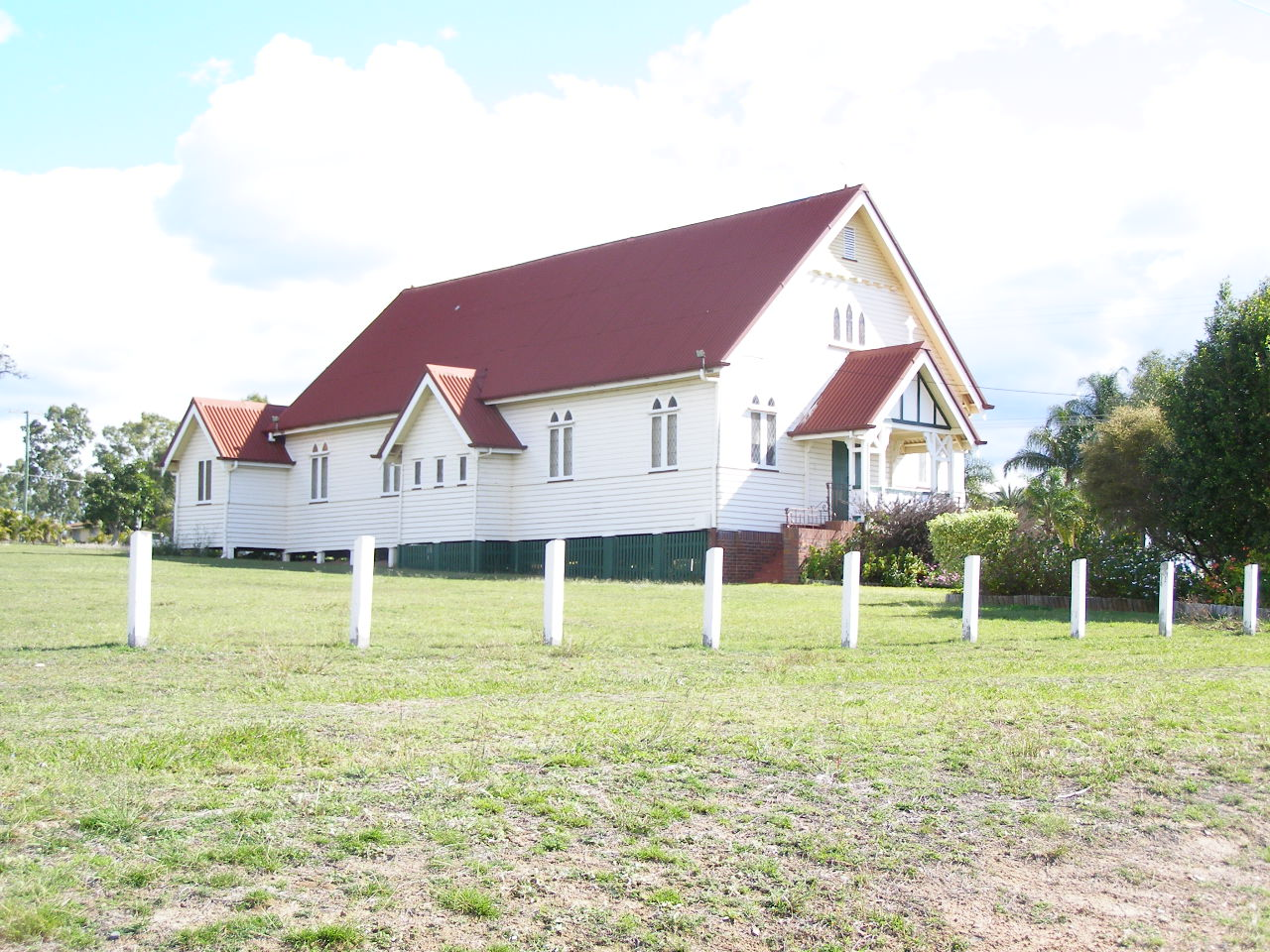
St Theresa's Catholic Church, 2006

The Glenore Grove branch of the Queensland Country Women's Association meets at 11 Brightview Road.

St Therese's Catholic Church is at 8 Brightview Road (27.5305°S 152.4084°E).
