= Kentville, Queensland =

Kentville
- Suburb
- Interactive map of Kentville
- Coordinates: 27.4747°S 152.4252°E
- Country: Australia
- State: Queensland
- LGA: Lockyer Valley Region
- Location: 18.5 km (11.5 mi) W of Lowood; 19.9 km (12.4 mi) NE of Gatton; 51.5 km (32.0 mi) WNW of Ipswich; 55.8 km (34.7 mi) E of Toowoomba; 87.6 km (54.4 mi) W of Brisbane

Government
  - State electorate: Lockyer
  - Federal division: Wright

Area
  - Total: 12.5 km^{2} (4.8 sq mi)

Population
  - Total: 108 (2021 census)
  - Density: 8.64/km^{2} (22.38/sq mi)
- Time zone: UTC+10:00 (AEST)
- Postcode: 4341
Suburbs around Kentville
Lockyer Waters	Lockyer Waters	Mount Tarampa
Morton Vale	Kentville	Lynford
Glenore Grove	Glenore Grove	Lockrose

Kentville is a rural locality in the Lockyer Valley Region, Queensland, Australia. In the 2021 census, Kentville had a population of 108 people.

== Geography ==
Kentville is flat freehold farming land, used for crops and grazing, approximately 70 metres above sea level. Lockyer Creek forms its south-west boundary. In the east of the locality is the One Mile Lagoon.

The Forest Hill Fernvale Road passes through the south-east of the locality.

== History ==
The One Mile Lagoon Provisional School opened on 7 October 1907, becoming One Mile Lagoon State School on 1 January 1909. In 1944 it was renamed Kentville State School.

In August 1908, the Australian Government approved the establishment of a receiving office One Mile Lagoon which was renamed Kentville in September 1909. It was upgraded to a post office on 1 July 1927. It closed on 1 April 1970.

== Demographics ==
In the 2016 census, Kentville had a population of 100 people.

In the 2021 census, Kentville had a population of 108 people.

== Education ==
Kentville State School is a government primary (Prep–6) school for boys and girls at 4 Turpin Road (27.4790°S 152.4272°E). In 2016, the school had an enrolment of 31 students with three teachers and eight non-teaching staff (three full-time equivalent). In 2018, the school had an enrolment of 44 students with 5 teachers (3 full-time equivalent) and 9 non-teaching staff (4 full-time equivalent).

There are no secondary schools in Kentville. The nearest government secondary schools are Lowood State High School in Lowood to the east and Lockyer District State High School in Gatton to the south-west.
