= Brisbane Valley Highway =

Highway in Queensland, Australia

Brisbane Valley Highway Queensland
- Brisbane Valley Highway (green and black)

General information
- Type: Highway
- Length: 89.5 km (56 mi)
- Route number(s): State Route A17; (Entire Route); Duplexes: State Route 85; (Esk – D'Aguilar Highway)
- Former route number: National Route 17

Major junctions
- South end: Warrego Highway (National Highway A2), Ipswich
- Esk–Hampton Road
- North end: D'Aguilar Highway (State Route A17 / State Route 85), 9 km (6 mi) south-east of Moore

Location(s)
- Major settlements: Fernvale, Esk, Toogoolawah, Harlin

Highway system
- Highways in Australia; National Highway • Freeways in Australia; Highways in Queensland

The Brisbane Valley Highway is a state highway in Queensland, Australia. It links the Warrego Highway near Ipswich and the D'Aguilar Highway about 4 km (2 mi) north of Harlin. Its direction follows the approximate course of the Brisbane River. It is part of State Route A17, which is duplexed with the D'Aguilar Highway to Nanango and then becomes the Burnett Highway. State Route 85 is duplexed with the Brisbane Valley Highway from Esk to the D'Aguilar Highway.

The highway crosses the Wivenhoe Dam about 9 km (6 mi) north-west of Fernvale.

== State-controlled road ==
Brisbane Valley Highway is a state-controlled, state-strategic road (number 42A).

== Upgrades ==
=== Intersection with Warrego Highway ===
From 2015, the intersection with the Warrego Highway was converted into a grade-separated interchange.

=== Pedestrian facilities ===
A project to upgrade pedestrian facilities in Fernvale, at a cost of $1.566 million, was due for completion in early 2022.

=== Safety improvements ===
A project to improve safety on a section of the highway, at a cost of $14.4 million, was due for completion in mid-2022.

=== Pavement rehabilitation ===
A project to rehabilitate the road surface through Esk township, at a cost of $5.5 million, was due for completion in mid-2022.

== List of towns along the Brisbane Valley Highway ==
- Ipswich
- Fernvale
- Esk
- Toogoolawah

== Major intersections ==
LGA	Location	km	mi	Destinations	Notes
Ipswich	Blacksoil	0	0.0	Warrego Highway (National Route A2) – east – Brisbane / west – Toowoomba	Southern end of Brisbane Valley Highway
Somerset	Fernvale	16.2	10.1	Forest Hill–Fernvale Road – south–west – Lowood	
Brisbane River		18.3	11.4	Geoff Fisher Bridge. This bridge spans the boundary between the localities of Fernvale and Wivenhoe Pocket	
Somerset	Wivenhoe Pocket	20.1	12.5	Wivenhoe–Somerset Road – north–east – Mount Glorious, Somerset Dam (via Splityard Creek Dam)	To Brisbane Forest Park via Northbrook Parkway
Brisbane River		22.5– 25.0	14.0– 15.5	Wivenhoe Dam wall. The dam wall is in the locality of Lake Wivenhoe.	
Somerset	Coominya	32.6	20.3	Coominya Connection Road – south – Coominya, Atkinson Dam	
Somerset	Esk	53.8	33.4	Gatton–Esk Road – south – Gatton, Toowoomba	
Somerset	Esk	54.2	33.7	Esk–Hampton Road (State Route 85) – south–west – Crows Nest, Toowoomba	State Route 85 southern concurrency terminus: continues south–west as Esk–Hampton Road.
Somerset	Esk	58.1	36.1	Esk–Kilcoy Road – east – Kilcoy (via Somerset Dam)	
Somerset	Harlin	89.5	55.6	D'Aguilar Highway (State Route A17) – north–west / (State Route 85) – east – Moore, Yarraman, Kilcoy, Sunshine Coast	State Route 85 northern concurrency terminus: continues east as D'Aguilar Highway. North–west to Moore and Yarraman; east to Kilcoy and Sunshine Coast.
Concurrency terminus

== Intersecting state-controlled roads ==
The following state-controlled roads, from south to north, intersect with the Brisbane Valley Highway:

- Forest Hill–Fernvale Road
- Wivenhoe–Somerset Road
- Coominya Connection Road
- Gatton–Esk Road
- Esk–Hampton Road
- Esk–Kilcoy Road

=== Forest Hill–Fernvale Road ===
Forest Hill–Fernvale Road
- Location: Gatton–Laidley Road, Forest Hill to Brisbane Valley Highway, Fernvale
- Length: 38.2 km (23.7 mi)

Forest Hill–Fernvale Road is a state-controlled district road (number 412) rated as a local road of regional significance (LRRS). It runs from Gatton–Laidley Road in Forest Hill to the Brisbane Valley Highway in Fernvale, a distance of 38.2 kilometres (23.7 mi). It intersects with Coominya Connection Road in Mount Tarampa, and the Warrego Highway in Forest Hill.

=== Wivenhoe–Somerset Road ===
Wivenhoe–Somerset Road
- Location: Brisbane Valley Highway, Wivenhoe Pocket to Esk–Kilcoy Road, Somerset Dam
- Length: 39.2 km (24.4 mi)

Wivenhoe–Somerset Road is a state-controlled district road (number 410) rated as a local road of regional significance (LRRS). It runs from Brisbane Valley Highway in Wivenhoe Pocket to Esk–Kilcoy Road in Somerset Dam, a distance of 39.2 kilometres (24.4 mi). It intersects with Mount Glorious Road (Northbrook Parkway) in Dundas.

=== Coominya Connection Road ===
Coominya Connection Road
- Location: Brisbane Valley Highway, Coominya to Forest Hill–Fernvale Road, Mount Tarampa
- Length: 12.9 km (8.0 mi)

Coominya Connection Road is a state-controlled district road (number 411) rated as a local road of regional significance (LRRS). It runs from the Brisbane Valley Highway in Coominya to Forest Hill–Fernvale Road in Mount Tarampa, a distance of 12.9 kilometres (8.0 mi). It does not intersect with any state-controlled roads.

=== Gatton–Esk Road ===
Gatton–Esk Road
- Location: Warrego Highway, Gatton to Brisbane Valley Highway, Esk
- Length: 39.8 km (24.7 mi)

Gatton–Esk Road is a state-controlled regional road (number 4144). It runs from the Warrego Highway in Gatton to the Brisbane Valley Highway in Esk, a distance of 39.8 kilometres (24.7 mi). It does not intersect with any state-controlled roads.

== Gallery ==
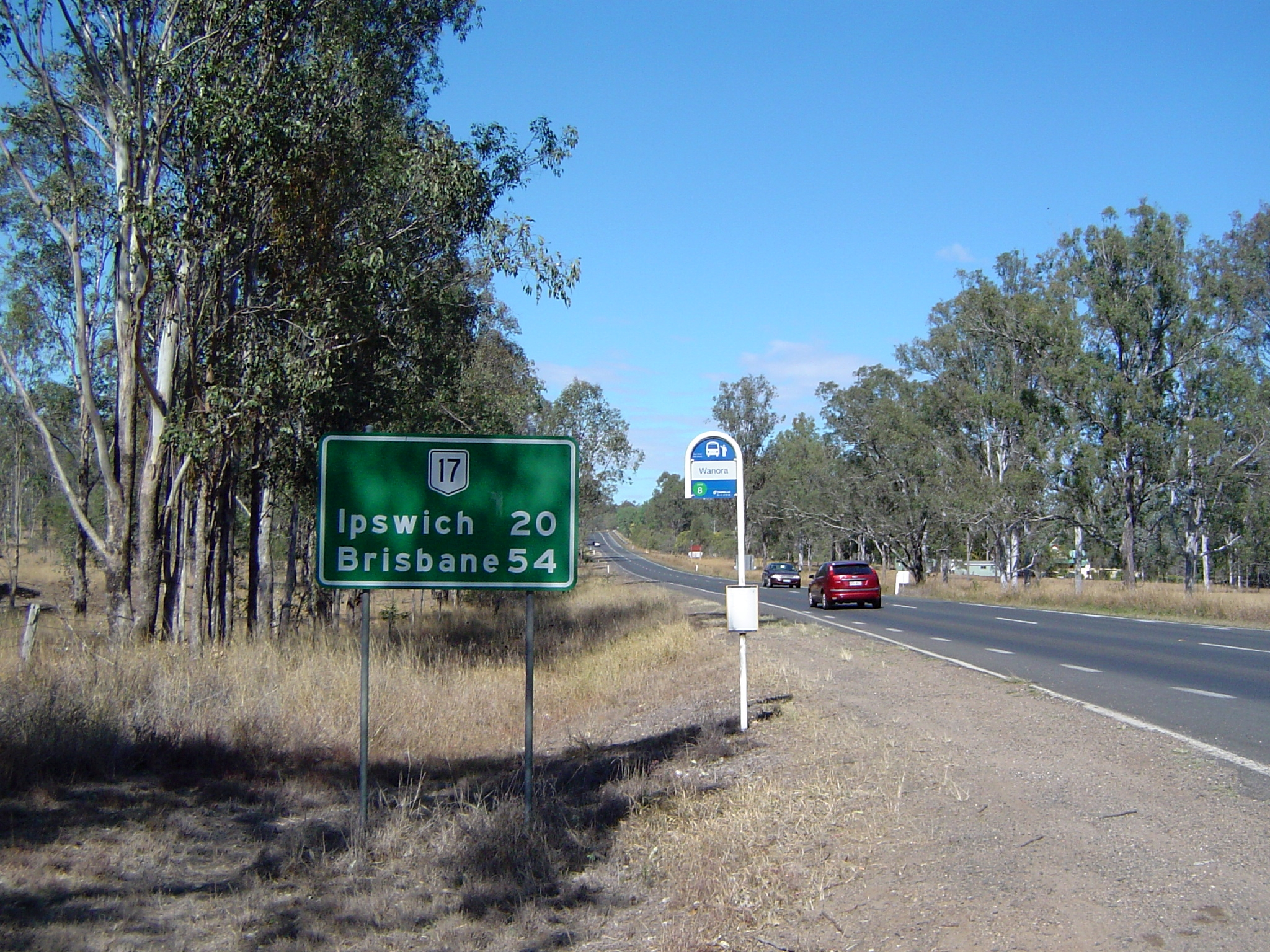
Brisbane Valley Highway at Wanora, 2014

== See also ==
- Bridges over the Brisbane River
- Highways in Australia
- List of highways in Queensland
- List of highways numbered 85
