= Atkinson Dam =

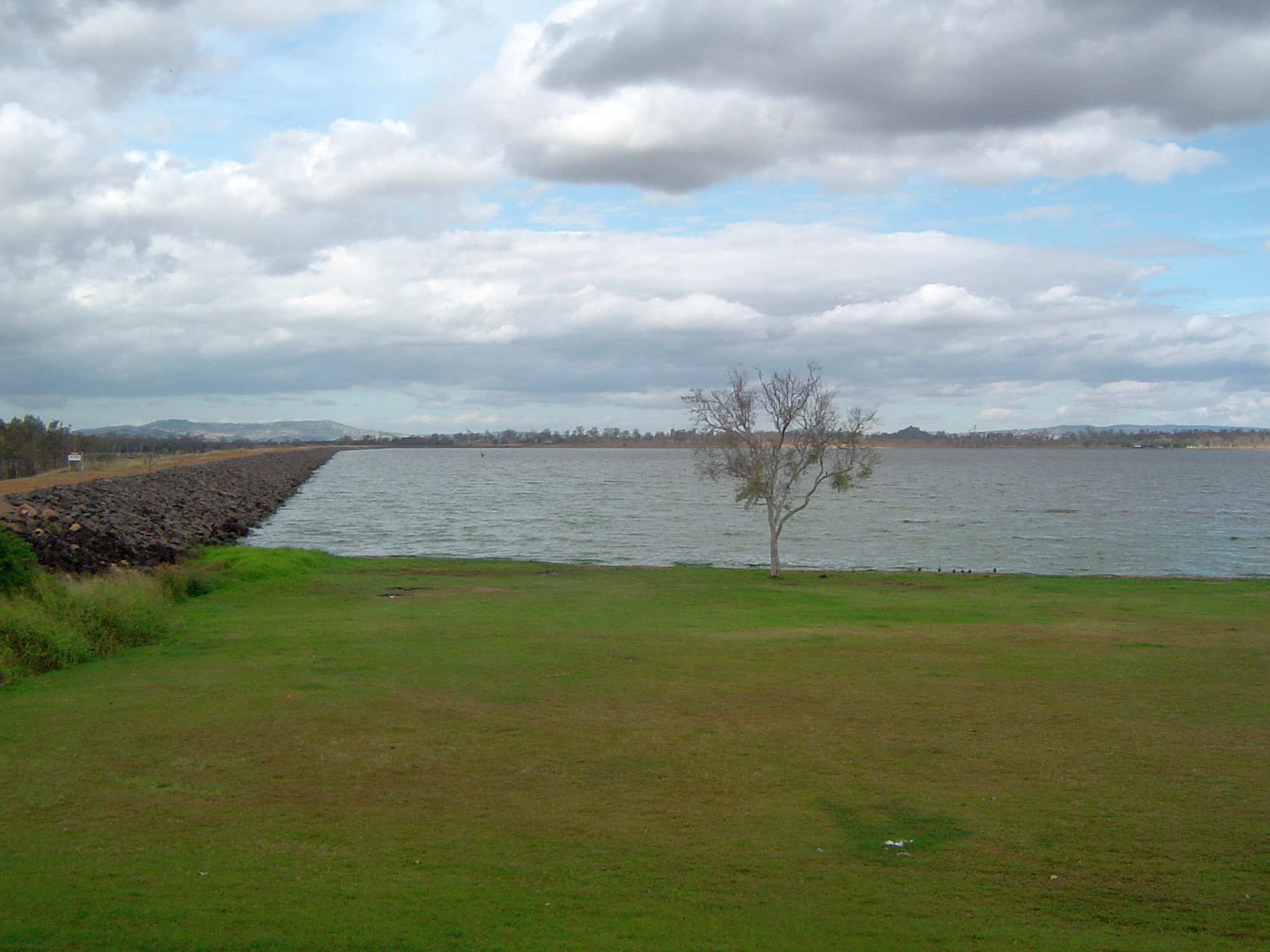
- Atkinson Dam wall

- Location of the Atkinson Dam in Queensland
- Country: Australia
- Location: South East Queensland
- Coordinates: 27°25′42″S 152°26′39″E
- Purpose: Irrigation
- Status: Operational
- Construction began: 1964
- Opening date: 1970
- Operator: SEQ Water

Dam and spillways
- Type of dam: Earth fill dam
- Impounds: Buaraba Creek
- Height: 9 m (30 ft)
- Length: 2,088 m (6,850 ft)
- Dam volume: 74×10^{3} m^{3} (2.6×10^{6} cu ft)
- Spillways: One
- Spillway type: Uncontrolled
- Spillway capacity: 439 m^{3}/s (15,500 cu ft/s)

Reservoir
- Creates: Lake Atkinson
- Total capacity: 30,500 ML (1,080×10^{6} cu ft)
- Catchment area: 32.72 km^{2} (12.63 sq mi)
- Surface area: 556 ha (1,370 acres)
- Maximum length: 4.2 km (2.6 mi)
- Maximum width: 2.5 km (1.6 mi)
- Maximum water depth: 9 m (30 ft)
- Normal elevation: 65.7 m (216 ft)
- Website www.seqwater.com.au

The Atkinson Dam is an earth-fill embankment dam across the Buaraba Creek and a naturally forming lagoon, which is located near Lowood in the South East region of Queensland, Australia. The main purpose of the dam is for irrigation of farming land in the lower Lockyer Valley. The resultant reservoir is called Lake Atkinson.

== Location and features ==
Located in the locality of Atkinsons Dam, 22 kilometres (14 mi) northeast of Gatton in the Somerset Region local government area of West Moreton region, the dam wall was constructed from 1964 to 1970 over the natural Atkinsons Lagoon, raised in 1998, and upgraded in 2008.

The dam wall is 9 metres (30 ft) high and 2,088 metres (6,850 ft) long and holds back 30,500 megalitres (6,700×10^{6} imp gal; 8,100×10^{6} US gal) of water when at full capacity. The surface area of the reservoir is 556 hectares (1,370 acres) and the catchment area is 32.72 square kilometres (12.63 sq mi). The uncontrolled spillway has a discharge capacity of 439 cubic metres per second (15,500 cu ft/s).

The dam is connected to Seven Mile Lagoon via a 1.2-kilometre (0.75 mi) channel. Facilities at the dam include two boat ramps, picnic tables and two caravan parks. A maximum of 15 boats are permitted on the lake at any one time. In mid-2006 the dam was empty due to drought conditions in Australia.

== Fishing ==
Fish stocking of silver perch, bass, southern saratoga and golden perch has resulted in an excellent fishery, although the dry periods, high evaporation rates and drawdowns for irrigation in summer, result in low water levels as well as oxygen depleted water which makes fishing much more difficult. Other fish that are present includes eel-tailed catfish and spangled perch.

== See also ==
- List of dams in Queensland
