= Lake Clarendon, Queensland =

Lake Clarendon
- Suburb
- Interactive map of Lake Clarendon
- Coordinates: 27.5263°S 152.3325°E
- Country: Australia
- State: Queensland
- LGA: Lockyer Valley Region
- Location: 10.2 km (6.3 mi) ENE of Gatton; 45.5 km (28.3 mi) E of Toowoomba CBD; 47.9 km (29.8 mi) WNW of Ipswich CBD; 84.4 km (52.4 mi) W of Brisbane CBD

Government
  - State electorate: Lockyer
  - Federal division: Wright

Area
  - Total: 25.3 km^{2} (9.8 sq mi)

Population
  - Total: 294 (2021 census)
  - Density: 11.62/km^{2} (30.10/sq mi)
- Time zone: UTC+10:00 (AEST)
- Postcode: 4343
Suburbs around Lake Clarendon
Adare	Spring Creek	Morton Vale
Adare	Lake Clarendon	Glenore Grove
Gatton	Lawes	Crowley Vale; College View

Lake Clarendon is a rural locality in the Lockyer Valley Region, Queensland, Australia. In the 2021 census, Lake Clarendon had a population of 294 people.

== Geography ==
The locality takes its name from the lake created by the Lake Clarendon Dam (27.5086°S 152.3511°E). Lockyer Creek forms the southern boundary of the locality.

== History ==
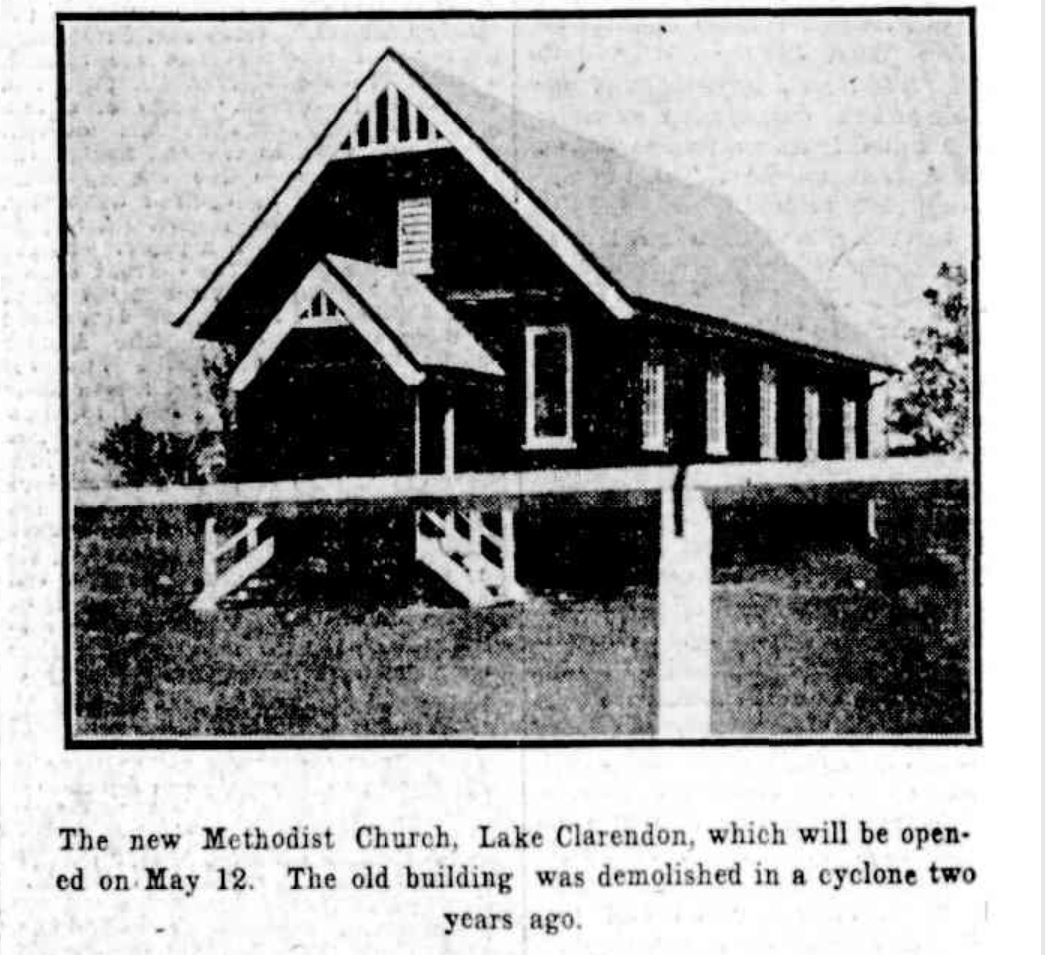
The new Methodist Church, 1928

Clarendon Provisional School opened circa 1882. In 1903 it was renamed Springdale Provisional School. It became Springdale State School on 1 January 1909, but closed later in 1909. Its precise location is not known but it was in the vicinity of the intersection of (present day) Adare, Lake Clarendon and Spring Creek.

Lake Clarendon State School opened on 9 June 1902.

St Edmund's Anglican Church was dedicated on 16 April 1910 by Archdeacon Henry Le Fanu. It closed circa 1960.

On 9 March 1914, the Lake Clarendon Lower State School opened but was renamed a few months later to be Morton Vale State School; it closed in 1981.

== Demographics ==
In the 2016 census, Lake Clarendon had a population of 288 people.

In the 2021 census, Lake Clarendon had a population of 294 people.

== Heritage listings ==
Lake Clarendon has the following heritage sites:

- Lake Clarendon State School, 35 Lake Clarendon Road

== Education ==
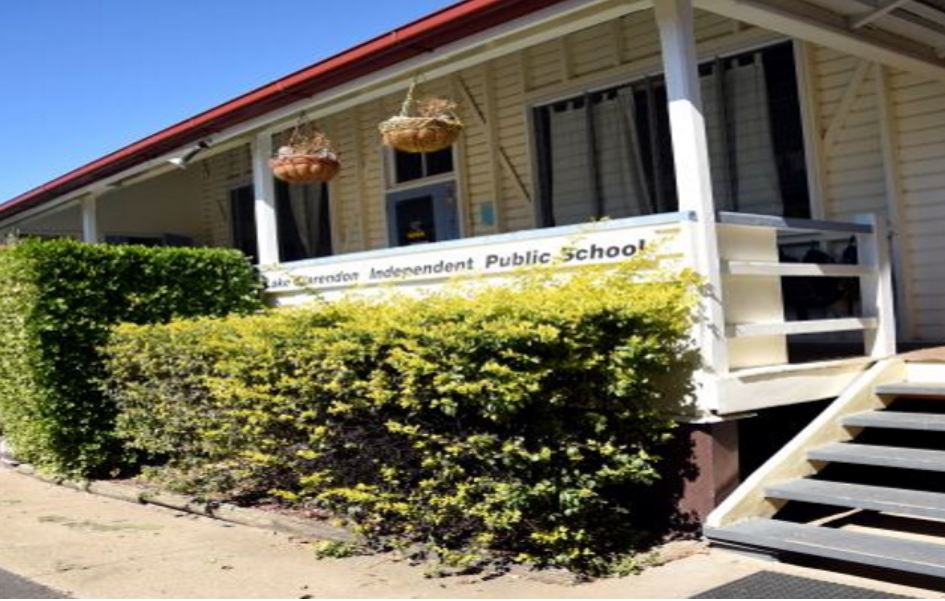
Lake Clarendon State School, 2024

Lake Clarendon State School is a government primary (Prep–6) school for boys and girls at 35 Lake Clarendon Road (27.5216°S 152.3582°E). In 2016, the school had an enrolment of 146 students with 13 teachers (11 equivalent full-time) and 8 non-teaching staff (5 equivalent full-time). In 2018, the school had an enrolment of 163 students with 15 teachers (12 full-time equivalent) and 10 non-teaching staff (6 full-time equivalent). It includes a special education program.

There are no secondary schools in Lake Clarendon. The nearest government secondary school is Lockyer District State High School in neighbouring Gatton to the south-west.
