= Lake Clarendon State School =

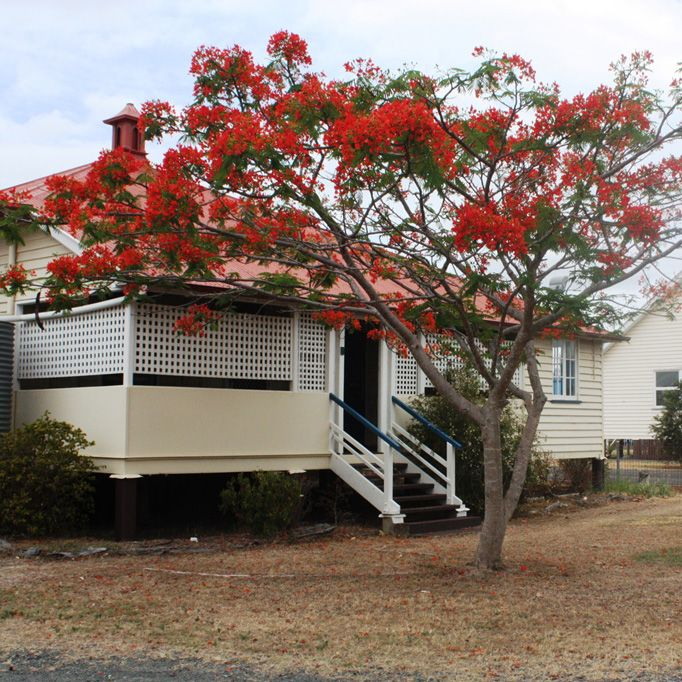
- Teacher's residence, Lake Clarendon State School, 2014

- Location within Queensland
- 27.5220°S 152.3584°E
- Location: 35 Lake Clarendon Road, Lake Clarendon, Lockyer Valley Region, Queensland, Australia

History
- Design period: 1900–1914 (Early 20th century)
- Built: 1901–1902, 1901–1902, 1906, 1914

Queensland Heritage Register
- Official name: Lake Clarendon State School
- Type: state heritage
- Designated: 12 June 2015
- Reference no.: 602857
- Type: Education, research, scientific facility: School-state
- Theme: Educating Queenslanders: Providing primary schooling
- Builders: Patrick Fagan

Lake Clarendon State School is a heritage-listed state school at 35 Lake Clarendon Road, Lake Clarendon, Lockyer Valley Region, Queensland, Australia. It was built from 1901 to 1902 by Patrick Fagan. It was added to the Queensland Heritage Register on 12 June 2015.

== History ==
Lake Clarendon State School, located about 8 kilometres (5.0 mi) northeast of Gatton, opened in 1902. The timber school residence and teaching building were erected in 1901–2 (the latter was extended in the late 1970s), and a playshed was added in 1906. An open-air school building (c. 1914) was also moved to Lake Clarendon from Glen Cairn State School c. 1974. The place is important in demonstrating the evolution of state education and its associated architecture in Queensland, and retains excellent examples of standard government designed school buildings that were an architectural response to prevailing government educational philosophies.

Traditionally the land of the Jagera people, the Lake Clarendon area was once part of Lake Clarendon Station - previously part of the Grantham pastoral run, which was reduced by government resumptions in the late 1860s and 1870s. Although the Lake Clarendon area was opened to selection around 1870, William and Walter Vanneck, who had taken up Grantham Station, took an interest in Lake Clarendon after the resumptions, and brought out the initial Lake Clarendon selectors to form a grazing property. The 14,000 acres (5,700 ha) Lake Clarendon Estate was repurchased from Walter Vanneck for £2 an acre by the government in 1899, and farm blocks were sold from November that year. The better agricultural land sold for £5 an acre, and the rich flats, after some initial hardships caused by the Federation drought, were soon growing lucerne, maize, onions, potatoes and pumpkins.

A state school was a natural result of successful closer settlement. In 1899 a school reserve of 9 acres (3.6 ha), 2 roods 12 perches (2,300 m^{2}) was surveyed just south of the lake reserve. The provision of state-administered education was important to the colonial governments of Australia, and the establishment of schools was considered an essential step in the development of early communities and integral to their success. Locals often donated land and labour for a school's construction and the school community contributed to maintenance and development. Schools became a community focus, a symbol of progress, and a source of pride, with enduring connections formed with past pupils, parents, and teachers.

At Lake Clarendon, a Building Committee was elected at a public meeting at the school reserve in August 1900, and soon applied for a state school. Local fundraising, which included dances, raised almost £90, out of the £120 required, by November 1900. The Minister for Education approved a state school at Lake Clarendon in January 1901, the land was granted to the Secretary of Public Instruction in June 1901, and tenders for the new school's buildings (school room and residence) and fencing were sought by August 1901.

To help ensure consistency and economy, the Queensland Government developed standard plans for its school buildings. From the 1860s until the 1960s, Queensland school buildings were predominantly timber-framed, an easy and cost-effective approach that also enabled the government to provide facilities in remote areas. Standard designs were continually refined in response to changing needs and educational philosophy and Queensland school buildings were particularly innovative in climate control, lighting, and ventilation. Standardisation produced distinctly similar schools across Queensland, with complexes of typical components.

In 1893 the Department of Public Works took over the design of schools from the Department of Public Instruction. Plans were at first based on earlier designs by architect Robert Ferguson - simple, lowset timber schools, with improved ventilation features, gabled roofs and front and back verandahs. The Works Department experimented with different combinations of roof ventilators, ceiling and wall vents, larger windows, dormer windows and ducting. Lake Clarendon's teaching building was one of the earlier designs of this period (Type C/T1, built from 1897 to 1909). It was built as a pair with the residence, and had exposed internal stud framing, verandahs front and back, high window sills, and an enclosed hat and lavatory annexe off the rear verandah. Ventilation features included the distinctive fleche on the roof - a feature shared with the residence - and louvres at the apex of the gables. The school room's dimensions were 31 by 20 feet (9.4 by 6.1 m); verandahs were 8 feet (2.4 m) wide, and the hat and lavatory annexe was 12 by 7 feet (3.7 by 2.1 m)). The residence (Type C/R3) had three bedrooms and a living room to either side of a central hallway, with front and rear verandahs, and the semi-detached rear kitchen wing included a bathroom and storeroom.

Most Queensland state schools incorporated a teacher's residence on the site, particularly in rural areas. In Australia, only Queensland offered free accommodation to teachers, the government policy applying to male teachers (only) from as early as 1864. This was partial recompense for a low wage, an incentive for teacher recruitment in rural areas and provided onsite caretakers. Refinement of the standard residence design occurred over time, with each modification responding to teacher complaints and Teachers' Union agitation. The more spacious residence used at Lake Clarendon, with a wide dining verandah between the house and kitchen wing, was a response to complaints about earlier designs having narrow verandahs.

Residences designed by the Department of Public Works' architects, and constructed to the high standard demanded by the state, were typically of a higher quality in design, materials and construction than most similarly scaled private residences. The detached teacher's residence was located within the school grounds at a distance from the teaching buildings, usually with a separate, fenced yard with gardens and trees. The designs ranged from one to four bedrooms and evolved simultaneously with the teaching buildings to keep up with modern needs and styles.

Contractor Patrick Fagan had finished the school buildings, at a cost of £783 16s, by 1 June 1902. The school opened in early June 1902, with an enrolment of 31 boys and 24 girls, and the Queensland Times, Ipswich Herald and General Advertiser soon reported that the teaching building and residence were splendid buildings, and "beyond a doubt for architectural style and finish they rank foremost in the Lockyer district". The teaching building was utilised for a welcoming social and dance for the new head teacher, William James Walton, and his wife. The area's first telephone was located at the school residence, which served as a post and receiving office from 1903, and a post office from 1906. The area's first public telephone for the district was installed on the verandah of the teaching building in 1911.

The School Committee (which replaced the Building Committee in 1904) was soon raising money for additions to the school. Arbor Day 1905 included an evening social to raise funds for a "weather shed" (playshed). The locals initially expected to only have to raise one-fifth of the cost of the playshed, but they were upset when told the government expected half the money to be raised locally.

The Queensland education system recognised the importance of play in the school curriculum and, as school sites were typically cleared of all vegetation, the provision of all-weather outdoor space was needed. Playsheds were designed as free-standing shelters, with fixed timber seating between posts and earth or decomposed granite floors that provided covered play space and doubled as teaching space when required. These structures were timber-framed and generally open sided, although some were partially enclosed with timber boards or corrugated galvanised iron sheets. The hipped (or less frequently, gabled) roofs were clad with timber shingles or corrugated iron. Playsheds were a typical addition to state schools across Queensland between c. 1880s and the 1950s, although were less frequently constructed after c. 1909, with the introduction of highset school buildings with understorey play areas. Lake Clarendon State School finally obtained a ten-post 30 by 20 feet (9.1 by 6.1 m) playshed in 1906, following the acceptance of John Doyle's tender for £60 that April. It was enclosed on the west and south sides in 1911, and was moved to its present position in 1951, from its original position 100 yards (91 m) behind the school.

An Arbor Day planting of trees in front of the Lake Clarendon teaching building is shown in a 1909 photograph, and the mature tree in front of the teaching building appears to be the last survivor of four trees, planted between the teaching building and the road and forming an avenue, visible on aerial photography from 1933.

From 1893 the Department of Public Works greatly improved the lighting of classroom interiors. Achieving an ideal or even adequate level of natural light in classrooms, without glare, was of critical importance to educators and consequently it became central to the design and layout of all school buildings. From around 1909 windows were rearranged and enlarged to provide a greater amount of gentle, southern light into the room and desks were rearranged so that the light would fall onto students' left hand sides to avoid throwing shadows onto the pages; this presupposed that all students were right-handed. This often meant a complete transformation of the fenestration of existing buildings. Windows were larger and sills were lowered to let in more light generally. Smaller classrooms were preferred as they were easier to light correctly. Interiors became lighter and airier and met with immediate approval from educationalists. At Lake Clarendon, casement windows were added just below the existing gable windows of the school room c. 1924.

The residence was also modified to meet changing requirements. In 1936 a sleep-out and extra room were added to the northwest side. French doors replaced the original bedroom windows on that side, and new doorways were added from the front and rear verandahs into the addition. A small toilet enclosure was later added to this space. The laundry on the southeast side of the residence existed by 1951, and the garage on the southeast side of the residence existed by 1974.

Other alterations occurred at Lake Clarendon State School. In c. 1954 the hats and lavatory annexe at the rear of the original teaching building was converted into a small library. A tennis court, originally located just northeast of the school residence, was moved to its current site northwest of the teaching building c. 1964. During the late 1960s the teaching building was refurbished to improve light and ventilation, and the pupils were taught in the playshed for 5 months. In 1970 an old school building (Block B) was moved from Atkinson's Lagoon State School (operated 1885–1968), for grades 4–7. This building is not of cultural heritage significance.

In the mid-1970s the school's Parents and Citizens' (P&C) Association bought a former open-air school building (Block C) from Glen Cairn State School (operated 1926–72). This now rare building (Type C/T7, 1914–20) was originally built for Ropeley East State School (operated 1915–55) before it was moved to Glen Cairn. Constructed by Alec MacDonald c. 1914, it measured 24 by 12 feet (7.3 by 3.7 m), and initially had canvas blinds instead of wall cladding along two sides, and part of the third side; while the remainder of the walls were clad with 4-by-1-inch (102 by 25 mm) vertical tongue and groove boards.

Open-air school buildings had been introduced as a standard design in 1913. This design was developed in response to contemporary medical thought related to the need for adequate ventilation and high levels of natural light for health, coupled with the need to build cheap, portable schools. The open-air type achieved maximum ventilation and natural light; it contained only one large room. Some had only one wall, the western verandah wall. The other sides were open with only adjustable canvas blinds for enclosure. Open-air school buildings proved to be inadequate and were discontinued in 1923, although many had been constructed across Queensland in 10 years. The open sides provided limited weather protection and climate control, and the canvas blinds deteriorated quickly. All open-air school buildings in Queensland were modified to provide better enclosure. At some point the canvas blinds on the open-air building at Lake Clarendon were replaced with timber cladding and sliding windows.

In the late 1970s a pre-school was added at Lake Clarendon. The original teaching building was extended to the southeast for a new classroom, and then a kitchen and staff room, in 1977–8. Since 1991, new structures have been added to the school; in front of the older school teaching buildings (shaded play areas), as well as to the rear (southwest) and to the west. In 2012 part of the school grounds became a car park, and the remaining grounds cover 3.7 hectares (9.1 acres).

Since establishment the school has been a key social focus for the local community, with the grounds and buildings having been the location of many social events over time. The first Arbor Day at the school occurred in 1904, and the event attracted the largest gathering yet seen in the district: 500–600 people, with ample food and a brass band supplied. Large community events occurred for the school's Golden Jubilee in 1952, and its 75th Jubilee in 1977. The school was also used by the public for various events until a CWA Hall became available nearby.

In 2015, Lake Clarendon State School retains its original teaching building, residence, and playshed, and the rare open-air school building. The school is important to the town and district, having operated since 1902, and generations of Lake Clarendon students have been taught there.

== Description ==
Lake Clarendon State School occupies a flat, 3.7-hectare (9.1-acre) site on the corner of the main thoroughfares of Lake Clarendon Road and Lake Clarendon Way in the town of Lake Clarendon, approximately 8 kilometres (5.0 mi) northeast of Gatton. The school comprises a number of lowset, timber-framed buildings with corrugated metal-clad roofs, which are set well back from the road and are positioned at the northern end of the school site. At the northern edge of these buildings and addressing Lake Clarendon Road, are the weatherboard-clad, concrete-stumped Department of Public Works (DPW) teaching building (1901–1902, extended 1977–1978) and DPW school residence (1901–1902, extended 1936). Constructed as a matching pair with similar architectural features, the northern elevations of these two buildings are aligned. Two out-buildings, a garage and laundry, are located to the east of the residence. An open-air school building (1914, moved onto the site c.1974) and playshed (1906) are located southwest of the DPW teaching building. The school is conspicuous in its rural setting, with well-established grounds that contain several mature trees.

=== Department of Public Works School Residence (1901–1902, extended 1936) ===
The DPW school residence is highly intact. The building has a hipped-roof core (1901–1902) with a verandah at the front (north) and a dining room at the rear (south, former verandah), a gable-roof kitchen wing (1901–1902), and a western enclosed sleep-out (1936). An original, metal roof fleche is featured on the roof of the core. Packed weatherboards are in the gable ends of the kitchen wing and end walls of the stove-alcove for ventilation. Corrugated metal-clad, timber-framed hoods shelter windows on the eastern side.

The building retains most of its early timber joinery. Windows include two-light sashes in the core, and six-light casements in the sleep-out. Early doors within the core include low-waisted doors (internal) and half-glazed French doors (front verandah wall and to the sleep-out space); and most doors have early hardware and centre-pivoting fanlights. Other doors within the sleep-out space are high-waisted doors with early hardware. Original braced-and-ledged doors of wide beaded boards access the kitchen wing and storeroom.

The front verandah features stop-chamfered timber posts and a three-rail balustrade, clad externally with modern flat sheeting. Its verandah wall is single-skin with chamferboard cladding and externally exposed stud framing and cross-bracing.

Internally, all ceilings are clad in vertically jointed (VJ), tongue-and-groove (T&G) boards. Skirtings and cornices are narrow timber with simple profiles. The core is centred on a hallway that runs north-south; with a bedroom and living room to the east and two bedrooms to the west. Its exterior walls are internally lined with wide, horizontal beaded-boards; and the interior partitions are single-skin with post and belt rails supporting vertical beaded-boards. Square ceiling vents within the core are sheeted over. The southern dining room's walls are lined with VJ boards and modern flat sheeting, and the space retains a stop-chamfered timber post from the original verandah fabric. Lightweight modern partitions form a small store room at the western end of the space (not of cultural heritage significance). The kitchen wing, on the southern side of the dining room, contains a generous stove alcove in the kitchen (now a pantry), a bathroom and a storeroom. It is internally lined in VJ boards, with wide beaded-boards in the store room. The sleep-out is lined with VJ boards; the eastern wall retains formerly exterior, weatherboard cladding. The sleep-out is a long space, with a small room and modern toilet enclosure at the south end.

=== Residence Out-Houses – Garage (pre-1974) and Laundry (pre-1951) ===
The garage and laundry are both single-skin, north-facing structures with skillion roofs and internally exposed stud framing and cross-bracing. The larger and northernmost building, the garage, is clad in VJ boards and has a concrete slab floor. The laundry is clad in weatherboards and has a timber floor. Both buildings have unlined eaves and louvred windows in timber frames.

=== Department of Public Works Teaching Building (1901–1902, extended 1977–1978) ===
The DPW teaching building is accessed via timber stairs to the front (north) verandah. It also has a rear verandah (now enclosed), to which an annexe is attached. The roof is gabled and has an original metal ventilation fleche in the centre, matching that of the residence. The roof overhang over the western end wall has spaced eaves to ventilate the roof space, and a triangular ventilation panel is in the gable apex. The western gable end wall has a large bank of high-level, stop-chamfered timber window frames (containing modern louvres), protected by a timber hood with decorative brackets and battened cheeks. The modern, eastern extension (1977–1978) is not significant.

Both verandahs have raked ceilings with the front verandah retaining its original beaded board lining. The front verandah has a single-skin verandah wall with exposed studwork and cross-bracing, stop-chamfered timber posts and a small surviving section of its early three-rail balustrade. The rear verandah is enclosed with modern flat-sheeting. Doorways and windows in the verandah walls are modern replacements, but occupy their original, symmetrical positions; with the exception of a large, modern opening in the rear wall. The entry door retains its 2-light fanlight.

The interior consists of a large, single classroom with a coved ceiling and stop-chamfered timber tie-beam. Skirtings, cornices and architraves are all narrow with simple profiles. The ceiling and walls are lined in modern flat sheeting, and the timber floors are lined with modern carpet and linoleum. The annexe has been converted into a teacher's room and has a coved ceiling lined with beaded boards. A small section of beaded board cladding is retained in the northern wall, while the remaining walls are clad in modern flat sheeting. A bank of early, vertically centre-pivoting windows (now fixed) in stop-chamfered timber frames remain in the southern wall.

=== Open-air School Building (1914, moved onto the site c. 1974) ===
The open-air school building is a small, single-room, hipped-roofed structure on low timber stumps. It has single-skin walls with internally exposed studs and cross-bracing, and VJ, T&G timber cladding - the boards are narrower on the eastern half of the building. Sliding windows with timber sashes have replaced blinds on the east, south and north sides. Access to the interior is via stairs on the north and south elevations, through braced and ledged, VJ timber doors. The hipped ceiling is lined with VJ, T&G timber boards, and a large timber tie beam is exposed within the space. Modern linoleum covers the timber floorboards.

=== Playshed (1906) ===
The playshed is a large 10-post timber structure with a hipped roof clad in corrugated metal sheeting. The posts are braced to the exposed roof framing by brackets. It is partially enclosed with vertically mounted, corrugated metal sheets, and has a modern, concrete slab floor.

=== Landscape Elements ===
The school grounds are established and include mature trees and plantings. Of particular importance is a large shade tree (pre-1933) in front of the DPW teaching building – the last surviving evidence of early plantings that emphasised the axial arrangement of the school entrance. The front gate and concrete pathway leading to the staircase of the DPW teaching building indicate the original north-south entry axis.

The DPW residence and DPW teaching building are linked visually by their similar scale, orientation and architectural features; in particular their metal roof fleches, north-facing orientation, construction materials, and alignment of their front verandahs.

The school is prominent in its rural setting and views of the surrounding pastoral areas are obtained from within the school grounds.

=== Other Structures ===
Other structures within the cultural heritage boundary, including modern teaching buildings, shade structures, sheds and tennis courts are not of cultural heritage significance.

== Heritage listing ==
Lake Clarendon State School was listed on the Queensland Heritage Register on 12 June 2015 having satisfied the following criteria.

The place is important in demonstrating the evolution or pattern of Queensland's history.

Lake Clarendon State School (established in 1902) is important in demonstrating the evolution of state education and its associated architecture in Queensland. The place retains a collection of good representative examples of standard government designs that were architectural responses to prevailing government educational philosophies.

These standard designs are: the Department of Public Works-designed teaching building (1901–1902), which demonstrates the evolution of timber school buildings to provide adequate lighting and ventilation; and the highly intact residence (1901–1902), which provides evidence of Departmental policy to provide accommodation for married male head teachers as an inducement to teach in country areas and to provide a resident caretaker on the site. The playshed (1906) demonstrates the education system's recognition of the importance of play in the curriculum; and the open-air school building (1914, relocated to Lake Clarendon c. 1974) demonstrates medical and educational theories of the period, which valued fresh air. All these buildings are set within school grounds containing mature shade trees, including one early tree in front of the teaching building.

The place demonstrates rare, uncommon or endangered aspects of Queensland's cultural heritage.

Surviving small, lowset, open-air school buildings are rare, as are intact Department of Public Works-designed large teacher's residences.

The place is important in demonstrating the principal characteristics of a particular class of cultural places.

Lake Clarendon State School is important in demonstrating the principal characteristics of Queensland state schools with their later modifications. These include: timber-framed buildings constructed to standard designs by the Queensland Government; and generous, landscaped sites with mature shade trees, play areas and sporting facilities. The school is a good example of a modest, regional school complex.

The Department of Public Works-designed school residence is an excellent, intact example of the residence type of its period - retaining its lowset, hipped roof, weatherboard-clad form with early joinery; and comprising three bedrooms, a living room, a kitchen with stove alcove, a front verandah and rear dining room, and natural ventilation features, including its ventilation fleche. The 1936 sleep-out addition is a good example of alterations that were commonly made to school residences to meet changing spatial requirements.

The Department of Public Works-designed teaching building is a good example of a regional timber school and is important in demonstrating the principal characteristics of its type. It retains its gable roof with ventilation fleche; some early timber joinery; single large classroom with generous verandahs (rear verandah now enclosed); rear annexe; coved ceiling; and single skin verandah walls (only retained at the front).

The open-air school building is a good example of its type, retaining its lowset design, with single-room classroom and hipped roof. The enclosures of the former canvas screen sections demonstrate typical modifications that were made to the type with changing educational philosophies.

The playshed is a good example of its type and retains its hipped timber-framed roof, supported on 10 braced timber posts.

The place has a strong or special association with a particular community or cultural group for social, cultural or spiritual reasons.

Schools have always played an important part in Queensland communities. They typically retain significant and enduring connections with former pupils, parents, and teachers; provide a venue for social interaction and volunteer work; and are a source of pride, symbolising local progress and aspirations.

Lake Clarendon State School has a strong and ongoing association with the Lake Clarendon community. It was established in 1902 through the fundraising efforts of the local community and generations of Lake Clarendon children have been taught there.

== See also ==
- List of schools in West Moreton
- History of state education in Queensland
