= Lowood State High School =

Location
- Prospect Street; Lowood, Queensland, 4311; Australia; 27.468521°S 152.582625°E

Information
- Type: State secondary day school
- Motto: Creating the Future
- Established: 1983
- Principal: Stacey Beu
- Grades: Year 7–12
- Gender: Coeducational
- Enrolment: 643 (August 2025)
- Houses: Oxley; Lockyer; Logan; Cunningham
- Website: lowoodshs.eq.edu.au

Lowood State High School is a band 10 state high school in Lowood (Queensland, Australia), located 32 km north-west of Ipswich, an area administered by the council of Somerset.

== Administration ==
The school's founding principal was Peter Whitelaw and the current principal is Stacey Beu.

Principals of the School
Tenure		Principal	Ref
Initial Year	Final Year	Principal	Ref
2018	Present	Stacey Beu	
2013	2017	Anne McLauchlan	
1983	1984	Peter Whitelaw	

== Year Levels ==
Lowood school, the original pre-Lowood State High School version of the school, accommodated pre-school to year 10 students. In its founding year of 1983, Lowood State High School initially catered for years 7–11, expanding to include year 12 a year later in 1984. Since then, the school has continued to cater for students from years 7 to 12 inclusive.

== Students ==
=== Student enrolments ===
For its initial two years (1983–1984) the school had a yearly enrolment of 250 to 300 students. In 2003, the school was reported to have an enrollment of around 700. The trend in school enrolments (August figures) has been:

Student enrolment trends
Year	Years						Boys	Girls	Total	School Capacity	Ref
Year	7	8	9	10	11	12	Boys	Girls	Total	School Capacity	Ref
2014	-	-	-	-	-	-	311	279	590	-	
2015	-	-	-	-	-	-	373	315	688	-	
2016	-	-	-	-	-	-	376	352	728	-	
2017	-	-	-	-	-	-	378	373	751	-	
2018	-	-	-	-	-	-	376	371	747	-	
2019	149	139	138	124	93	61	366	338	704	849	
2020	147	148	134	126	110	77	373	369	742	849	
2021	146	161	145	133	107	91	390	393	783	849	
2022	122	140	157	143	96	74	371	361	732	905	
2023	132	120	132	152	93	67	368	328	696	905	
2024	134	129	113	115	107	65	356	308	663	905	
2025	TBA	TBA	TBA	TBA	TBA	TBA	338	305	643	905	
2026	TBA	TBA	TBA	TBA	TBA	TBA	TBA	TBA	TBA	905	

Lowood State High School is currently being reported as having a maximum student enrolment capacity of 905 students.

== House structure ==
The school's four sports houses are named after Australian explorers, in particular those associated with the exploration of Queensland's Brisbane River:

Current house system
House name	Colour	Mascot	Australian explorers
Oxley	Green	Crocodile	John Oxley
Lockyer	Red	Lion	Edmund Lockyer
Logan	Blue	Shark	Patrick Logan
Cunningham	Yellow	Hornet	Allan Cunningham

== School Hall ==
=== Flood Refuge ===
The school's hall has been used as a place of refuge during the flooding of the local area, in particular, the floods of November 2023 in which the hall played a crucial role.

== Notable alumni ==
The following are notable alumni of the school:

Notable alumni
Name	Achievement	Ref
Tom Court	Shotputter and international rugby union player	
Graeme Lehmann^{†}	Mayor of Somerset Council	
Dane Sampson	Olympic sporting shooter	

† A graduate from Lowood School, the pre-Lowood State High School version of the school.

== See also ==
- List of schools in Greater Brisbane
- List of schools in Queensland
- Lists of schools in Australia
