= Lockyer Creek Railway Bridge =

Lockyer Creek Railway Bridge may refer to one of three bridges crossing Lockyer Creek in Queensland, Australia:

- Lockyer Creek Railway Bridge (Clarendon), at Clarendon, Somerset Region, built 1885-1886
- Lockyer Creek Railway Bridge (Lockyer), at Lockyer, Lockyer Valley Region, built 1909-1910
- Lockyer Creek Railway Bridge (Murphys Creek), at Murphys Creek, Lockyer Valley Region, built c. 1910-1911
