= Rifle Range, Queensland =

Rifle Range
- Suburb
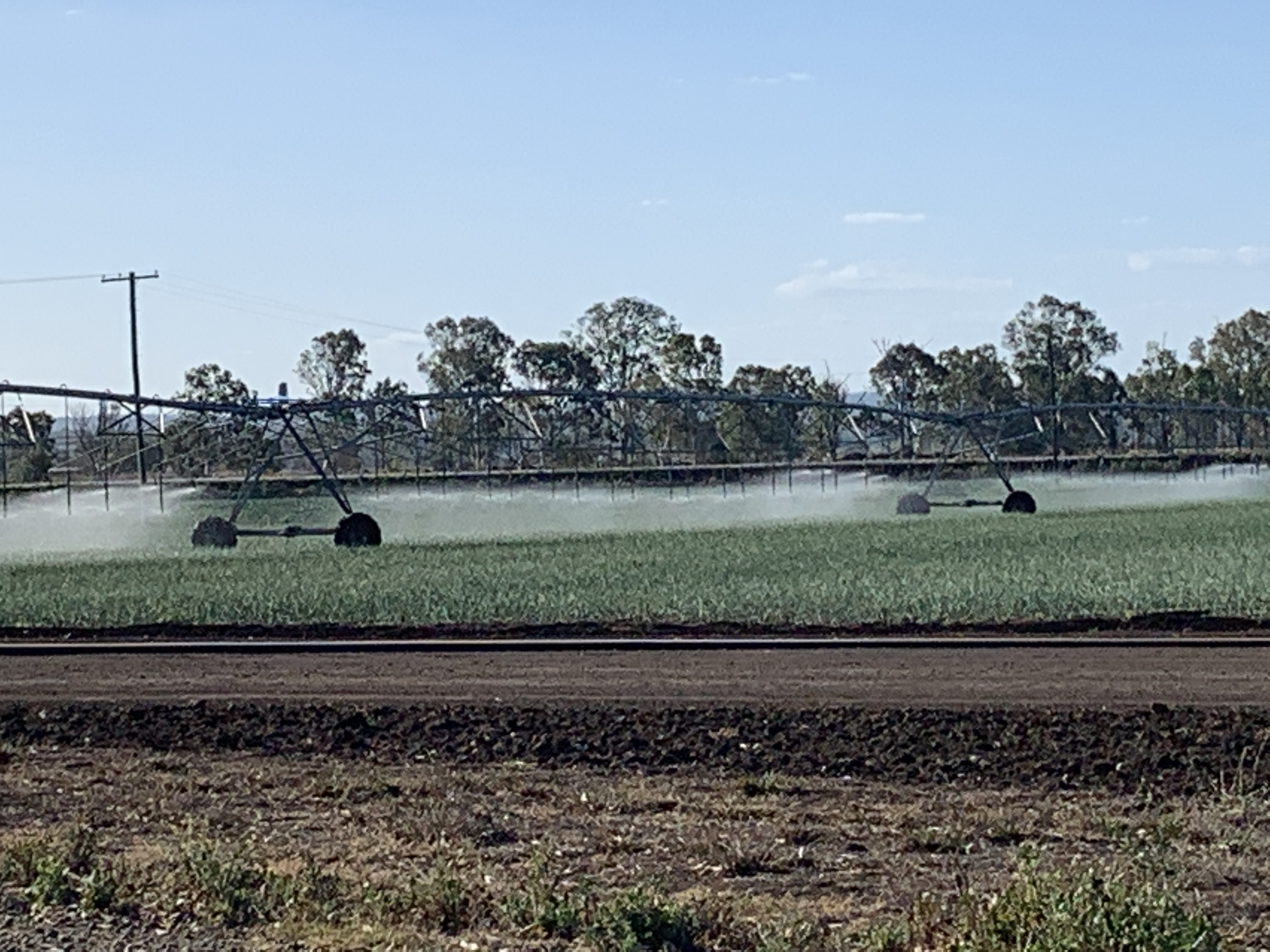
- Irrigated farming, Rifle Range, 2019

- Interactive map of Rifle Range
- Coordinates: 27.4566°S 152.5344°E
- Country: Australia
- State: Queensland
- City: Somerset Region
- LGA: Somerset Region
- Location: 14.1 km (8.8 mi) W of Fernvale; 38.5 km (23.9 mi) NW of Ipswich; 40.9 km (25.4 mi) SSE of Esk; 75.9 km (47.2 mi) W of Brisbane

Government
  - State electorate: Lockyer
  - Federal division: Blair

Area
  - Total: 9.4 km^{2} (3.6 sq mi)

Population
  - Total: 197 (2021 census)
  - Density: 20.96/km^{2} (54.3/sq mi)
- Time zone: UTC+10:00 (AEST)
- Postcode: 4311
Suburbs around Rifle Range
Clarendon	Clarendon	Lowood
Mount Tarampa	Rifle Range	Lowood
Mount Tarampa	Brightview	Lowood

Rifle Range is a locality in the Somerset Region, Queensland, Australia. In the 2021 census, Rifle Range had a population of 197 people.

== Geography ==
Lockyer Creek marks the suburbs northern and western boundary.

There is irrigated cropping in areas close to the creek with grazing on native vegetation in the middle of the locality. The southern part of the locality is most rural residential.

Rifle Range Road provides access into the locality from neighbouring Lowood.

== History ==
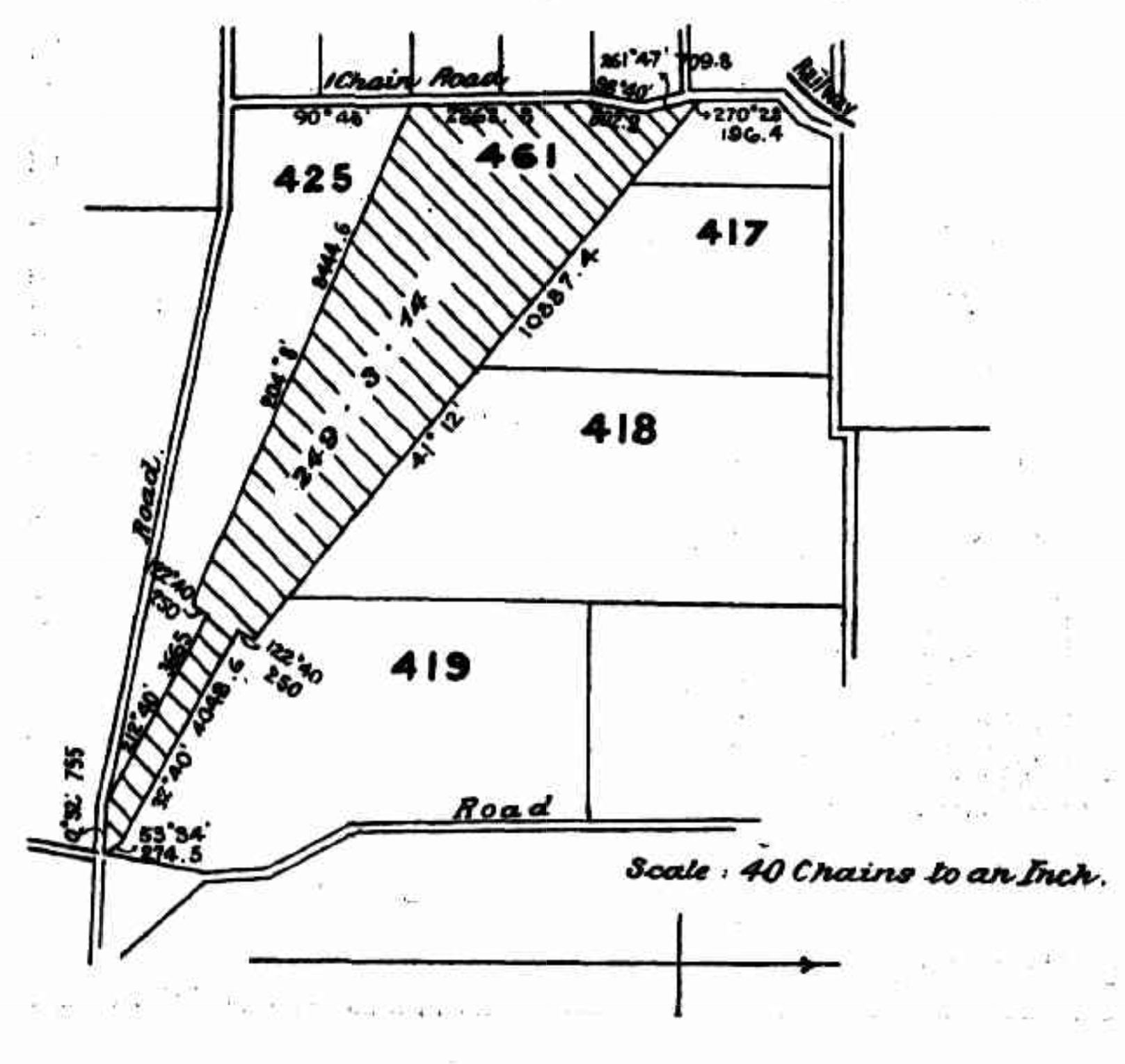
Map of Lowood Rifle Range (shaded), boundary roads are Clarendon Road (north), Wyatts Road (west), Rifle Range Road (south west), Forest Hill Fernvale Road (south) and Reinbotts Road (east), 1904.

A rifle range was first established near Lowood in 1886. In January 1905 the Queensland Government sold a parcel of land for £260 to establish a new rifle range near Lowood. The south-east boundary of the rifle range is the present-day south-eastern boundary of the locality of Rifle Range (Plan CC58 Lot 461, 27.455°S 152.55°E) and presumably the origin of its name. The Lowood rifle range closed in 1953.

== Demographics ==
In the 2016 census, Rifle Range had a population of 186 people.

In the 2021 census, Rifle Range had a population of 197 people.

== Education ==
There are no schools in Rifle Range. The nearest government primary schools are Clarendon State School in neighbouring Clarendon to the north and Tarampa State School in Tarampa to the south. The nearest government secondary school is Lowood State High School in neighbouring Lowood to the east.
