= Clarendon, Queensland =

Clarendon
- Suburb
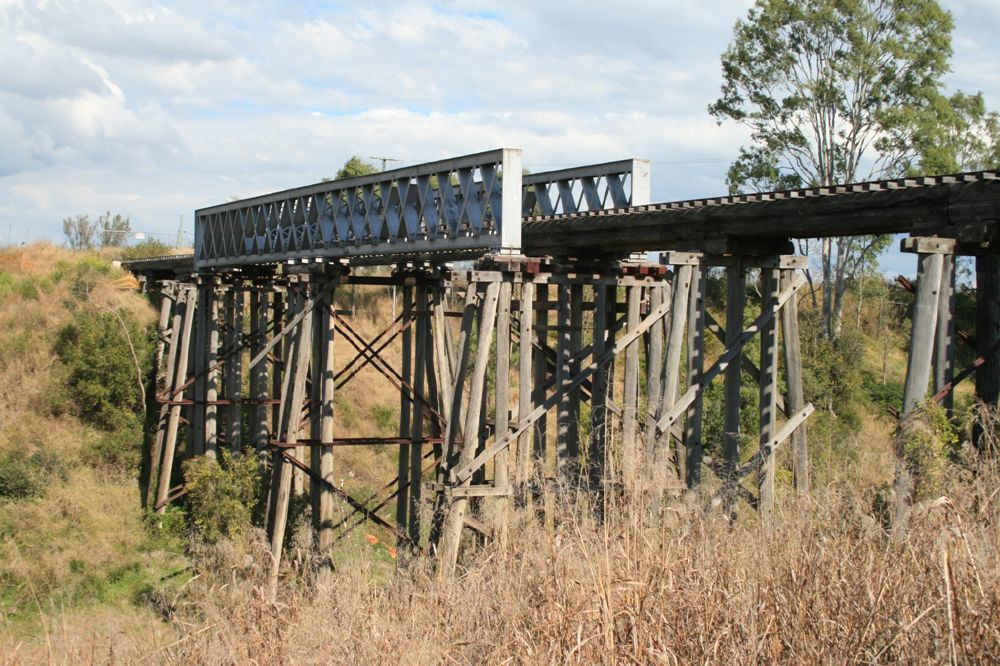
- Lockyer Creek Railway Bridge, 2008

- Interactive map of Clarendon
- Coordinates: 27.4319°S 152.5177°E
- Country: Australia
- State: Queensland
- City: Somerset Region
- LGA: Somerset Region
- Location: 9.7 km (6.0 mi) WNW of Lowood; 32.1 km (19.9 mi) S of Esk; 44.6 km (27.7 mi) NW of Ipswich; 78.8 km (49.0 mi) S of Brisbane

Government
  - State electorates: Lockyer; Nanango
  - Federal division: Dickson

Area
  - Total: 18.1 km^{2} (7.0 sq mi)

Population
  - Total: 232 (2021 census)
  - Density: 12.82/km^{2} (33.20/sq mi)
- Time zone: UTC+10:00 (AEST)
- Postcode: 4311
Suburbs around Clarendon
| Coominya | Coominya | Patrick Estate |
| Atkinsons Dam | Clarendon | Patrick Estate |
| Mount Tarampa | Rifle Range | Lowood |

Clarendon is a rural locality in the Somerset Region, Queensland, Australia. In the 2021 census, Clarendon had a population of 232 people.

== Geography ==
The locality takes its name from Lake Clarendon (approx 20 kilometres (12 mi) to the south-west).

Lockyer Creek enters the locality from the south-west (Mount Tarampa / Rifle Range) and forms part of the southern boundary of the locality. The creek then passes through the locality and then forms its northern, north-eastern, and eastern boundaries before exiting to the south-east (Patrick Estate / Lowood).

== History ==
Clarendon railway station is an abandoned railway station on the dismantled Brisbane Valley railway line (27.4244°S 152.5355°E). Clarendon railway station was in use from 1886 to 1995 (it was called Tarampa railway station initially but was renamed).

Lockyer Creek Provisional School opened circa 1891. In 1892, it was renamed Lockyer Provisional School. It closed in 1915. Its location was described as "near Clarendon".

Clarendon Post Office opened on 1 July 1927 (a receiving office had been open from 1873 under the names of Tarampa, Watson's and Clarendon) and closed in 1951.

Clarendon State School opened on 23 January 1929.

== Demographics ==
In the 2016 census, Clarendon had a population of 244 people.

In the 2021 census, Clarendon had a population of 232 people.

== Heritage listings ==
Clarendon has a number of heritage-listed sites, including:

- Lockyer Creek Railway Bridge, Brisbane Valley railway line (27.4199°S 152.5305°E)

== Education ==
Clarendon State School is a government primary (Prep–6) school for boys and girls at 507 Clarendon Road (27.4398°S 152.5425°E). In 2018, the school had an enrolment of 84 students with 6 teachers (5 full-time equivalent) and 9 non-teaching staff (4 full-time equivalent).

There are no secondary schools in Claredon. The nearest government secondary school is Lowood State High School in neighbouring Lowood to the south-east.

== Facilities ==
Despite the name, Lowood Cemetery is within the locality of Claredon on a bend in Claredon Road (near the junction with Nunns Road, 27.4415°S 152.5472°E). It is operated by the Somerset Regional Council.
