= Patrick Estate, Queensland =

Patrick Estate
- Suburb
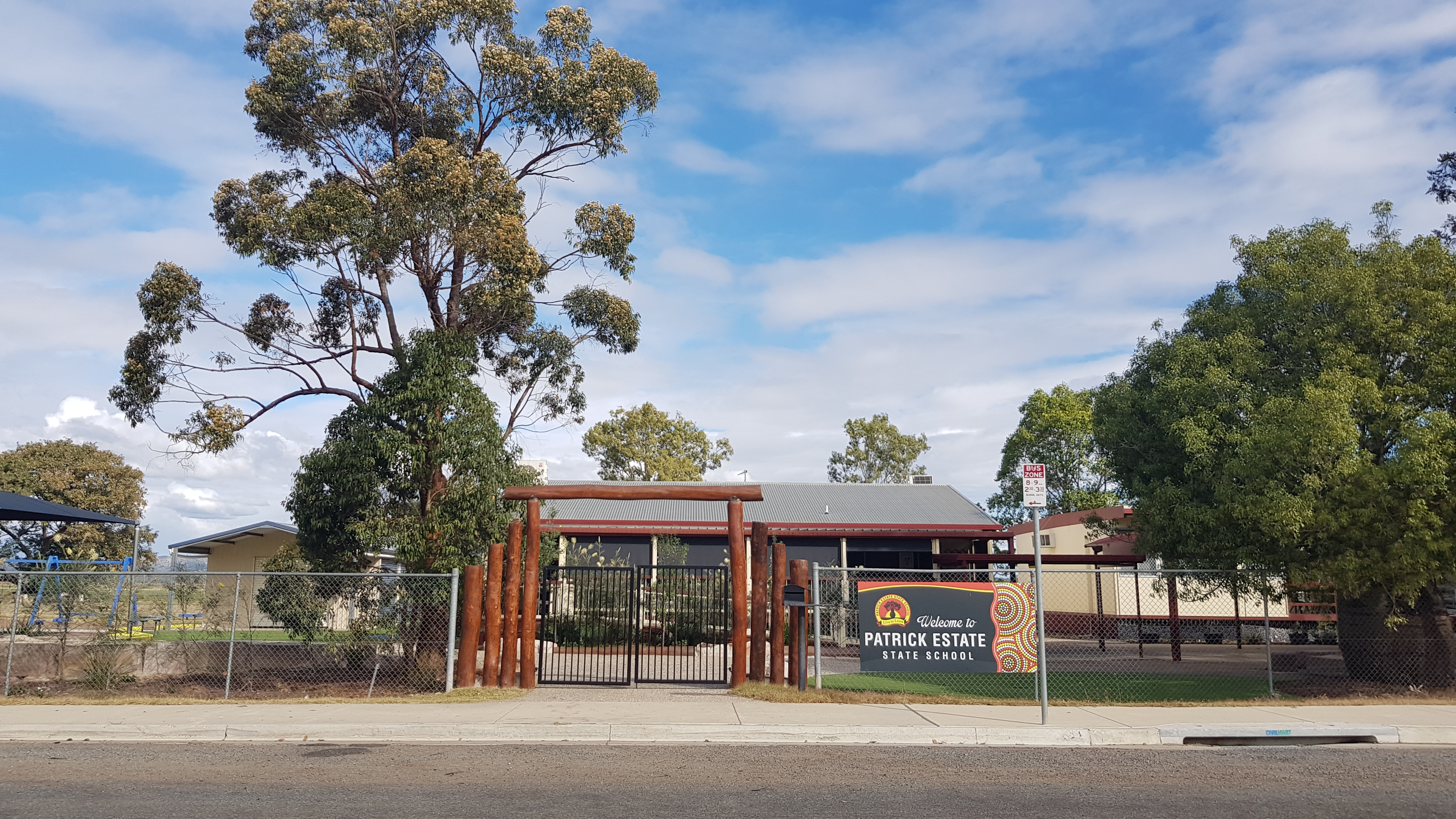
- Patrick Estate State School, 2023

- Interactive map of Patrick Estate
- Coordinates: 27.4152°S 152.5844°E
- Country: Australia
- State: Queensland
- LGA: Somerset Region
- Location: 6.1 km (3.8 mi) N of Lowood; 32.4 km (20.1 mi) SSE of Esk; 35.0 km (21.7 mi) NW of Ipswich CBD; 76.1 km (47.3 mi) W of Brisbane CBD

Government
  - State electorates: Lockyer; Nanango
  - Federal division: Blair

Area
  - Total: 22.7 km^{2} (8.8 sq mi)

Population
  - Total: 181 (2021 census)
  - Density: 7.97/km^{2} (20.65/sq mi)
- Time zone: UTC+10:00 (AEST)
- Postcode: 4311
Suburbs around Patrick Estate
Coominya	Wivenhoe Hill	Lake Wivenhoe
Clarendon	Patrick Estate	Wivenhoe Pocket
Lowood	Wivenhoe Pocket	Wivenhoe Pocket

Patrick Estate is a rural locality in the Somerset Region, Queensland, Australia. In the 2021 census, Patrick Estate had a population of 181 people.

== Geography ==
The Brisbane River forms the eastern boundary of the locality. Lockyer Creek forms part of the western boundary before passing through the locality from west to east to its confluence with the Brisbane River.

== History ==
The locality is named after William Patrick and John Patrick, who selected land on the north side of lower reaches of Lockyer Creek on 22 July 1868.

Patrick Estate State School opened on 28 January 1925.

== Demographics ==
In the 2016 census, Patrick Estate had a population of 199 people.

In the 2021 census, Patrick Estate had a population of 181 people.

== Education ==
Patrick Estate State School is a government primary (Prep-6) school for boys and girls at 816 Mahon Road (27.4109°S 152.5679°E). In 2016, the school had an enrolment of 36 students with 4 teachers (3 full-time equivalent) and 6 non-teaching staff (3 full-time equivalent). In 2018, the school had an enrolment of 42 students with 3 teachers (2 full-time equivalent) and 9 non-teaching staff (4 full-time equivalent).

There are no secondary schools in Patrick Estate. The nearest government secondary school is Lowood State High School in neighbouring Lowood to the south-west.
