= Lockyer Creek =

Lockyer
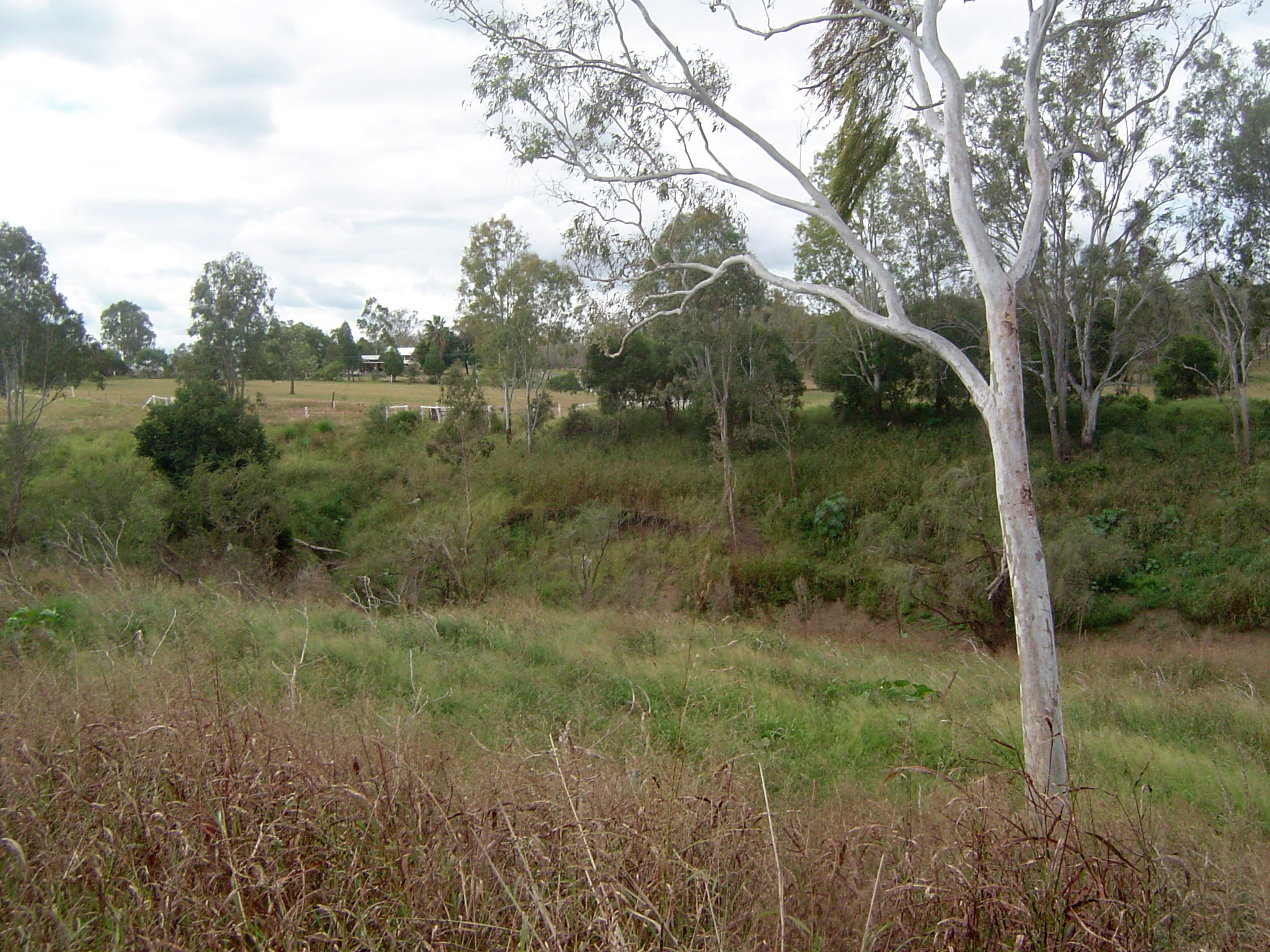
- Lower Lockyer Creek, 2011

- Location of the Lockyer Creek mouth in Queensland
- Etymology: Edmund Lockyer

Location
- Country: Australia
- State: Queensland
- Region: South East Queensland
- Cities: Helidon, Grantham, Gatton

Physical characteristics
- Source: Great Dividing Range
  - location: Main Range National Park
  - coordinates: 27°28′6″S 152°5′19″E
  - elevation: 216 m (709 ft)
- Mouth: confluence with the Brisbane River
  - location: near Wivenhoe Pocket
  - coordinates: 27°24′59″S 152°36′20″E
  - elevation: 37 m (121 ft)
- Length: 113 km (70 mi)
- Basin size: 3,032 km^{2} (1,171 sq mi)

Basin features
- River system: Brisbane River
- Tributaries
  - left: Buaraba Creek, Redbank Creek (Queensland), Sheep Creek (Queensland), Alice Creek (Queensland), Murphy's Creek
  - right: Plain Creek, Laidley Creek, Sandy Creek (Queensland), Tenthill Creek, Ma Ma Creek, Flagstone Creek (Queensland), Gatton Creek
- National park: Main Range National Park

The Lockyer Creek is a creek in South East Queensland, Australia. A tributary of the Brisbane River, the creek is a major drainage system in the Lockyer Valley. Rising on the eastern slopes of the Great Dividing Range, the creek flows generally north-easterly for more than 100 kilometres (62 mi) before it reaches its confluence with the Brisbane River north-northeast of Lowood, and downstream from the Wivenhoe Dam. The creek is named after Edmund Lockyer.

== Course and features ==
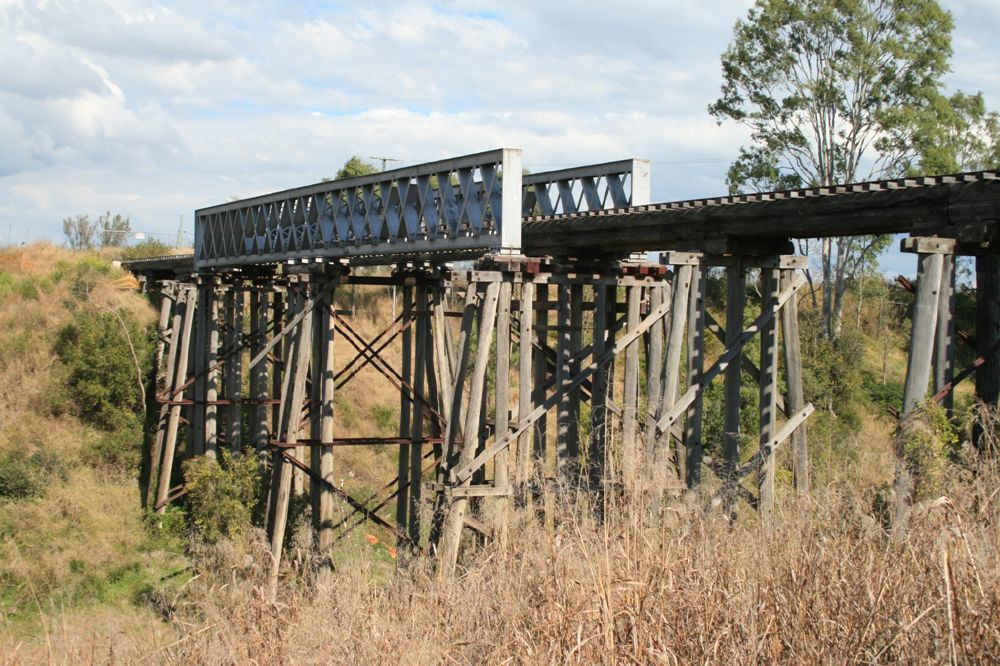
Lockyer Creek Railway Bridge at Clarendon in 2008

Draining parts of the western Scenic Rim, the creek's headwaters are in the Main Range National Park, a small sub-section of the Great Dividing Range. Its tributaries drain the slopes east of Toowoomba and areas to the north of Gatton. The total stream length of the Lockyer Creek network is 6,056 kilometres (3,763 mi).

The total catchment area is 3,032 km^{2} (1,171 sq mi), and covers nearly one quarter of the total catchment area of the Brisbane River. O'Reillys Weir is located about 1 kilometre (0.62 mi) upstream from the creek's confluence with the Brisbane River. Approximately 5 kilometres (3.1 mi) upstream from the junction of Lockyer Creek and the Brisbane River is the Wivenhoe Dam. Tributaries flowing into Lockyer Creek include Flagstone Creek, Sandy Creek, Alice Creek, Laidley Creek, Tenthill Creek, Murphys Creek and Ma Ma Creek.

Lower areas of the catchment have been cleared for intensive agriculture. Upper parts of the catchment remain mostly forested, partially protected within Lockyer National Park formerly known as White Mountain State Forest. Bushfires, soil protection, water quality and flood management are the main resource management issues for the waterway. The creek is significantly degraded. The poor conditions have resulted in unstable stream banks and gully erosion from the removal of riparian vegetation.

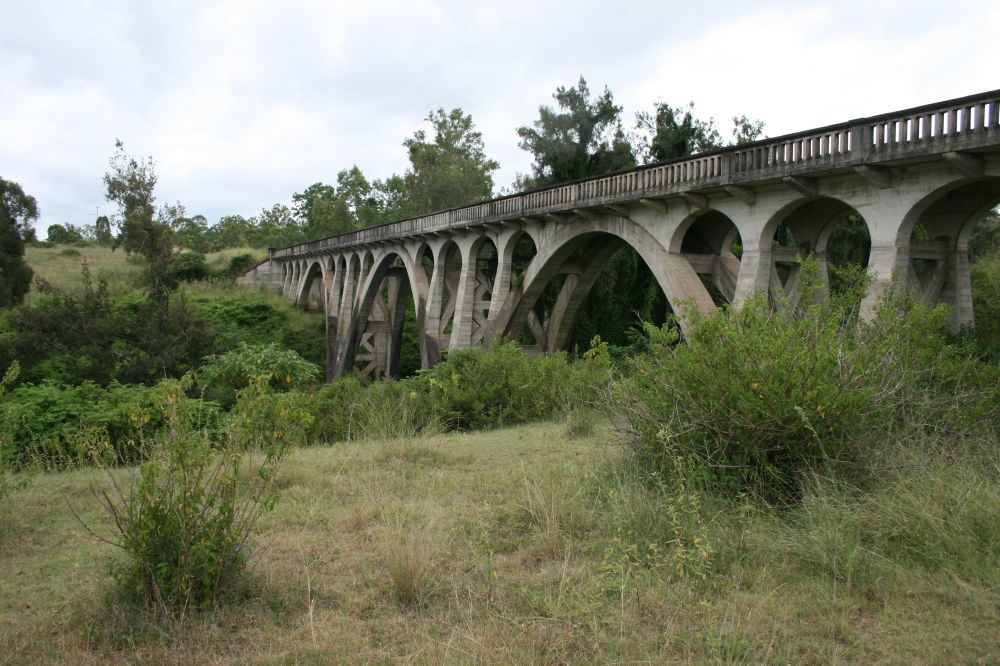
Bridge at Guinn Park in 2009

There are a total of nine major private and public water storages within this drainage system, including Atkinson Dam, Bill Gunn Dam and Lake Clarendon. The Lockyer Creek valley had been one of the driest catchments in Queensland during the recent droughts in Australia.

== Flood events ==
During the 2011 Queensland floods, on 10 and 11 January the creek experienced severe flash flooding from overnight and daytime heavy rain in a catchment of about 2,000 square kilometres (770 sq mi). During the floods the creek reached 18 metres (59 ft) deep, a record that was higher than what was experienced during the 1974 Brisbane flood.

The Bureau of Meteorology recorded a rise of 8 metres (26 ft) in 23 minutes during the flash flood but initially dismissed the reading as a fault. It was estimated that 4,000 tonnes or 4,000 megalitres (1,100×10^{6} US gal) of water per second flowed through Lockyer Creek, leading to the use of descriptive phrases such as "wall of water", or even "inland tsunami". Water rose approximately 9 feet (2.7 m) above the 1893 flood level recorded at the Lockyer Creek Railway bridge (see below). Dozens of homes were destroyed and 19 people died in the floods. The town of Grantham was particularly hard hit.

A report by GHD Group for the Brisbane City Council suggested that flood mitigating dams on Lockyer Creek and Bremer River could be a useful measure for flood proofing Brisbane.

== Bridges ==
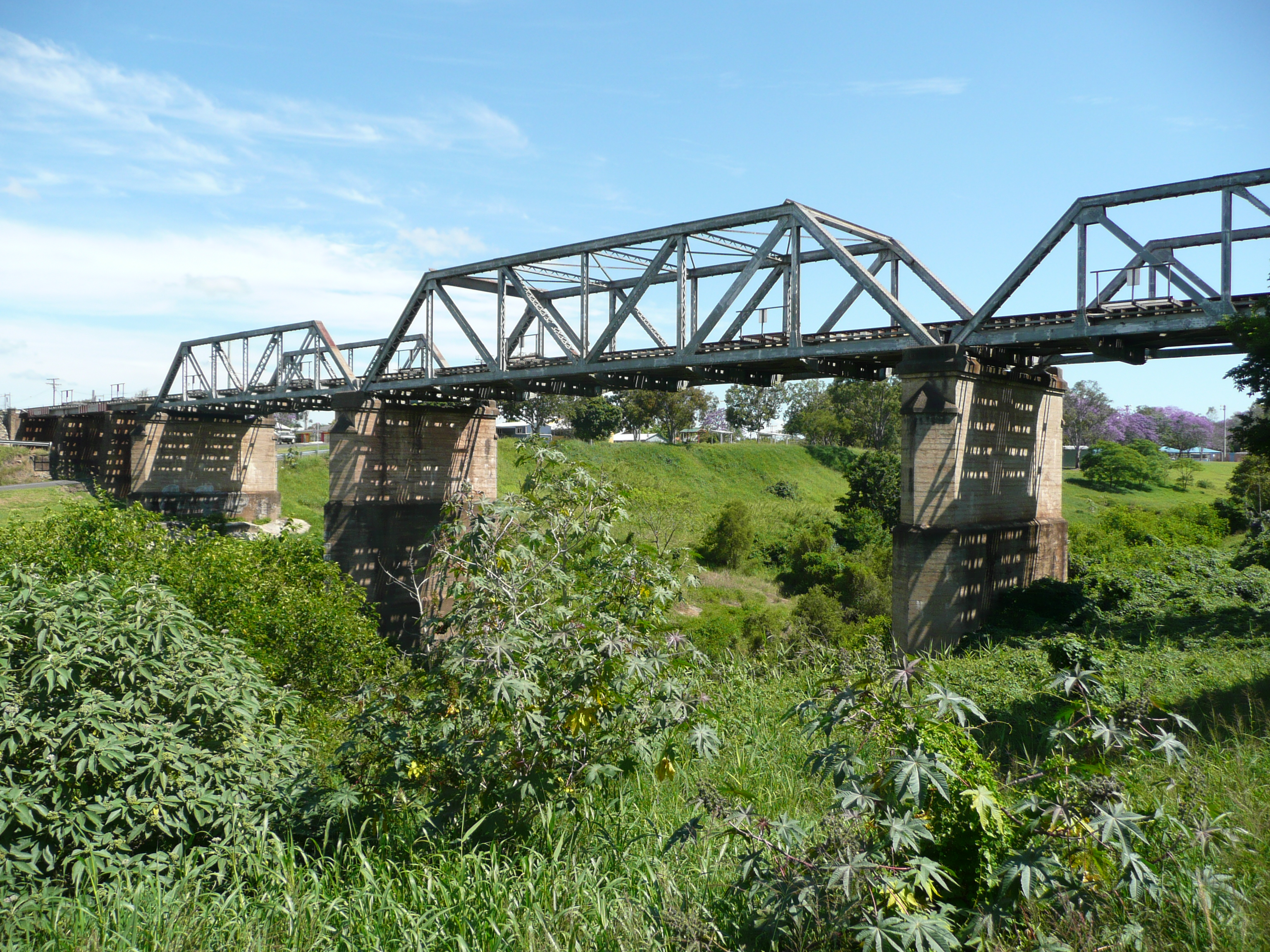
Railway Bridge at Gatton, 2010

The Lockyer Creek Bridge at Bageli Park, designed by William Pagan, is one of the largest of its type in Queensland and one of Australia's first reinforced concrete arch rail bridges. The bridge, built in 1910/1911, features three spans, each supported by two arches, and appeared on a stamp that was part of a series featuring landmark bridges. A model of the bridge was featured in the April 2011 edition of the Australian Model Railway Magazine. The bridge is still used for very heavy Brisbane bound coal and grain traffic. Another single arch bridge on the same line, but over a side gully, with the same name, is closer to Gatton and was built in 1903. Further downstream in the district of Clarendon, an earlier railway structure (1885) built of timber piles with a deck of iron trusses, is possibly as spectacular. This bridge is no longer used by rail traffic.

== Heritage listings ==
Lockyer Creek has a number of heritage-listed sites, including:

- Toowoomba – Helidon Line: Lockyer Creek Railway Bridge (Lockyer)
- Toowoomba – Helidon Line: Lockyer Creek Railway Bridge (Murphys Creek)
- Brisbane Valley railway line: Lockyer Creek Railway Bridge (Clarendon)

== See also ==
- List of rivers of Australia § Queensland
