= Tarampa State School =

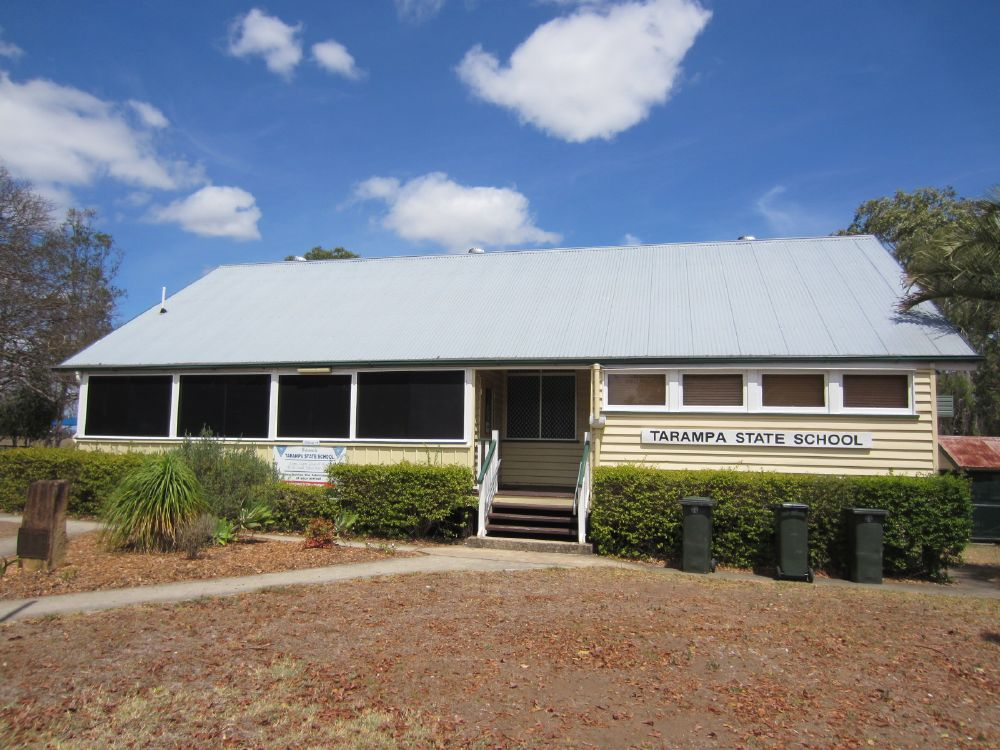
- East elevation of the Tarampa State School teaching building, 2014

- Location within Queensland
- 27.4872°S 152.5460°E
- Location: 18 Manthey Road, Tarampa, Somerset Region, Queensland, Australia

History
- Design period: 1870s–1890s (Late 19th century)
- Built: 1886–1897, 1894, Leopard tree, known as 'Dibby Dibby' tree, 1897, 1934

Site notes
- Architect(s): Robert and John Ferguson; Queensland Department of Public Works

Queensland Heritage Register
- Official name: Tarampa State School; Tarampa Provisional School
- Type: state heritage
- Designated: 1 May 2015
- Reference no.: 602849
- Type: Education, research, scientific facility: School-state
- Theme: Educating Queenslanders: Providing primary schooling
- Builders: J G (George) Schlecht

Tarampa State School is a heritage-listed state school at 18 Manthey Road, Tarampa, Somerset Region, Queensland, Australia. It was designed by Robert and John Ferguson, Queensland Department of Public Works and built from 1886 to 1897 by J G (George) Schlecht. It is also known as Tarampa Provisional School. It was added to the Queensland Heritage Register on 1 May 2015.

== History ==
Tarampa State School opened in 1880 as Tarampa Provisional School on a four-acre (1.62ha) site within the small agricultural settlement in the Brisbane Valley, to serve the sparse but growing rural population. As settlement increased, the provisional school building was replaced by a Ferguson-designed teaching building (1886) and other structures and landscape elements were built, including a playshed (1897) and a new teacher's residence (1934). The school has been in continuous operation since establishment and has been a focus for the local community as a place for important social and cultural activity.

European occupation of the Brisbane Valley dates from 1841. Tarampa Station, a large pastoral lease stretching from the D'Aguilar Range to Glenmore Grove and from Prenzlau to Coominya, was established by Charles Cameron in the 1840s. Agricultural settlement followed in the early 1860s on the Tarampa Agricultural Reserve, created under the Agricultural Reserves Act 1861. The settlers around Tarampa were predominantly of German origin. Primarily subsistence farmers, they raised livestock and grew mixed crops.

Tarampa Provisional School opened in a private house on 1 April 1880 with 20 children attending on the first day. Construction of a school building on Lot 374, a four-acre (1.62ha) site purchased from Michael Kerlin, was undertaken by Mr Graff in 1880 for £60.

The provision of state-administered education was important to the colonial governments of Australia. Following the introduction of Queensland's Education Act 1860, which established the Board of General Education and began standardising curriculum, training and facilities, Queensland's public schools grew from four in 1860 to 230 by 1875. The State Education Act 1875 provided for free, compulsory and secular primary education and the establishment of the Department of Public Instruction. This further standardised the provision of education, and despite difficulties, achieved the remarkable feat of bringing basic literacy to most Queensland children by 1900.

The establishment of schools was considered an essential step in the development of early communities and integral to their success. Locals often donated land and labour for a school's construction and the school community contributed to maintenance and development. Schools became a community focus, a symbol of progress and a source of pride, with enduring connections formed with past pupils, parents and teachers. The inclusion of war memorials and community halls reinforced these connections and provided a venue for a wide range of community events in schools across Queensland.

To help ensure consistency and economy, the Queensland Government developed standard plans for its school buildings. From the 1860s until the 1960s, Queensland school buildings were predominantly timber-framed, an easy and cost-effective approach that also enabled the government to provide facilities in remote areas. Standard designs were continually refined in response to changing needs and educational philosophy and Queensland school buildings were particularly innovative in climate control, lighting and ventilation. Standardisation produced distinctly similar schools across Queensland with complexes of typical components.

Tarampa benefitted from the extension of the Brisbane Valley railway line to nearby Lowood in 1884, which provided local farmers with improved access to markets for their produce and stimulated the timber industry in the area.

Due to increased enrolments, Tarampa's provisional school was upgraded to a state school in 1886. In colonial Queensland, provisional schools were a convenient means of providing an elementary education for the small, scattered and often transient rural population and became an integral part of the educational landscape. A provisional school could be opened with as few as 15 (later 12) pupils. The Board of Public Instruction gave financial assistance to local committees to set up and maintain these schools. The local committee provided a building and found a teacher, while the Board paid the teacher's salary relative to the number of pupils. If the local population declined, the provisional school closed at little expense to the Board. If the district or town developed, as Tarampa did, the provisional school was raised to state school status and provided with purpose-designed school buildings. A tender by JG (George) Schlecht for £500 was accepted in 1886 for the building of a standard, Ferguson-designed teaching building. The old teaching building was converted for use as the teacher's residence on the site. In the same year, Schlecht was also contracted to fence the school for £37, as wandering stock were damaging the paintwork and water tanks.

The new building at Tarampa State School was built to a standard design that was introduced in 1880 and constructed across the colony until 1893. Employed by the Department of Public Instruction as its first Superintendent of Buildings, builder-architect Robert Ferguson was responsible for school building design between 1879 and 1885, and he was the first to give serious consideration to the ventilation of interiors. Into the lowset, timber-framed buildings Ferguson introduced a coved ceiling and vented the roof space, improving internal temperatures. The number of windows and their size was increased; however, they were few in number and sill heights were typically over 4 feet 6 inches (1.37 m) above floor level, well above the eye level of students. Modestly-decorative timber roof trusses were exposed within the space. In 1885 Robert Ferguson was replaced as Superintendent of Buildings by his brother John Ferguson who continued to implement his brother's designs until John's death in 1893, when responsibility for school buildings passed back to the Department of Public Works. Built to this standard design, the new school building at Tarampa State School was a low-set, timber-framed structure with gable roofs, verandahs front and back, and modest "carpenter gothic" timber detailing.

In 1897 plans for additions to the school and residence were drawn. It is likely that the school was extended to the north at this time, increasing its length from 34 feet (10 m) to approximately 50 feet (15 m). At some time a central timber partition was added, dividing the building into two classrooms. The proposed residence was not built, but additions, improvements, repairs and painting of the Ferguson building were advertised for tender.

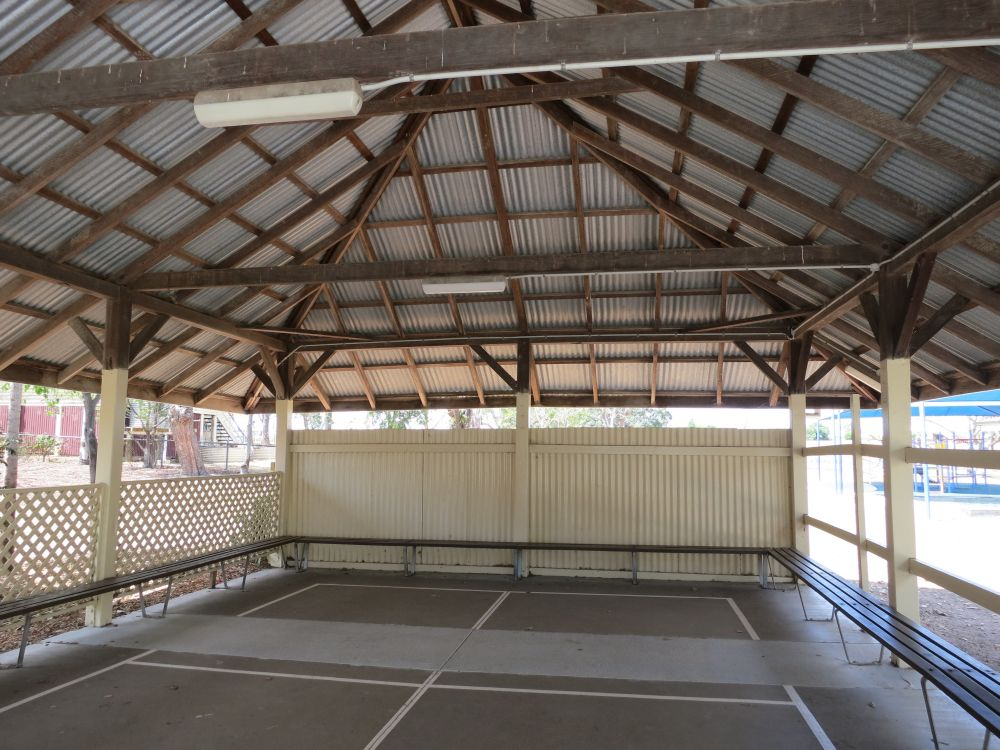
Interior of the playshed, 2014

In 1897 a 10-post timber playshed with a hipped roof was built at the school by F Williams for £59 10s. The Queensland education system recognised the importance of play in the school curriculum and, the need for all-weather outdoor space. Playsheds were designed as free-standing shelters, with fixed timber seating between posts and earth or decomposed granite floors that provided covered play space and doubled as teaching space when needed. These structures were timber-framed and generally open sided, although some were partially enclosed with timber boards or corrugated galvanised iron sheets. The hipped (or less frequently, gabled) roofs were clad with timber shingles or corrugated iron. Playsheds were a typical addition to state schools across Queensland between c. 1880s and the 1950s, although less frequently constructed after c. 1909, with the introduction of highset school buildings with understorey play areas. Built to standard designs, playsheds that ranged in size relative to student numbers.

The turn of the century brought growth in the area. Tarampa run was repurchased by the Queensland Government and opened for selection by small farmers in 1903. A cream depot had been established at Tarampa in the 1890s, and in September 1903 the Lowood butter factory opened, providing a local facility for dairy providers. Tarampa's population rose to a peak of a little over 500 in 1911 and enrolments at its school increased accordingly. In 1919 the two-roomed Ferguson building accommodated 117 children.

Repairs and improvements to the Ferguson building were carried out in August 1928 after the Head Teacher, George Oxley Anderson, complained to the Department of Public Instruction about its inadequate lighting conditions and lack of ventilation. Subsequently, it was lined and painted, and general repairs undertaken.

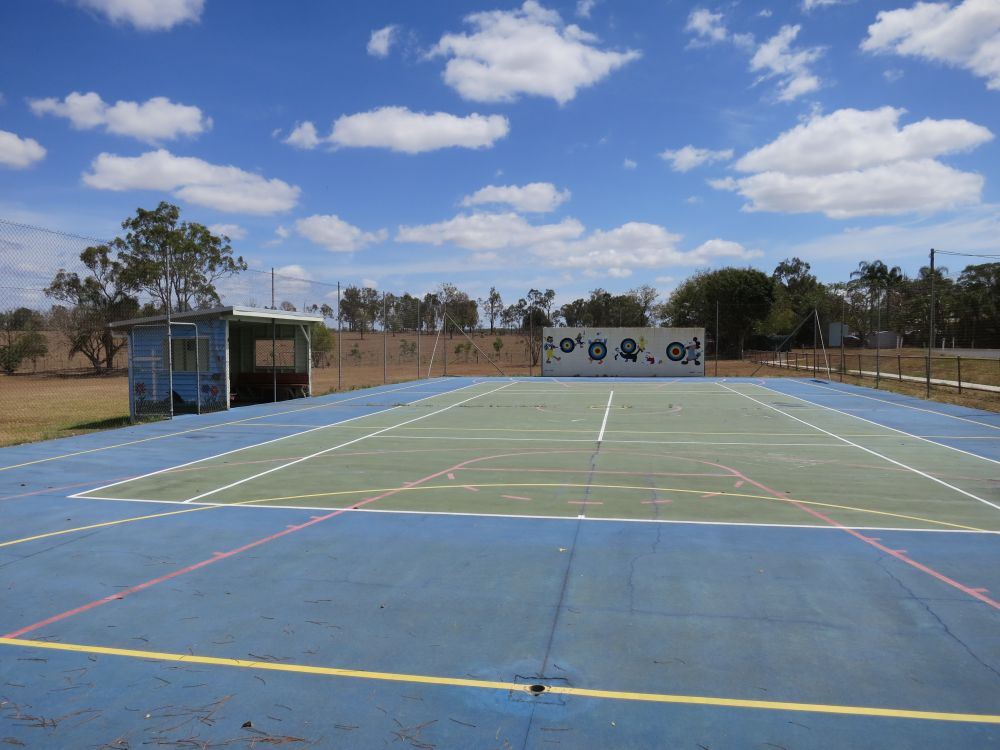
Tennis court, looking north, 2014

Further alterations to the Ferguson building to improve the lighting and ventilation were made in 1933. These were to a standard design by the Department of Public Works. They included a new door from the north classroom to the back verandah and cost £5 2s 6p. Also at this time, the windows in the gable end walls may have been widened and lowered. From 1893 the Department of Public Works greatly improved the natural ventilation and lighting of classroom interiors, experimenting with different combinations of roof ventilators, ceiling and wall vents, larger windows, dormer windows and ducting.

In 1928 community working bees erected a new school fence and repaired the disused tennis court with new posts and a new surface. Photographic evidence shows tennis being played on the grass tennis court c. 1920s.

In 1930, 50th jubilee celebrations took place at the school. Approximately 1,000 people, 14 of whom were first day pupils, attended the day. £130 was raised for school improvements. A Jubilee Ball in the evening concluded the celebrations, "which proved to be the most successful social event in the history of Tarampa".

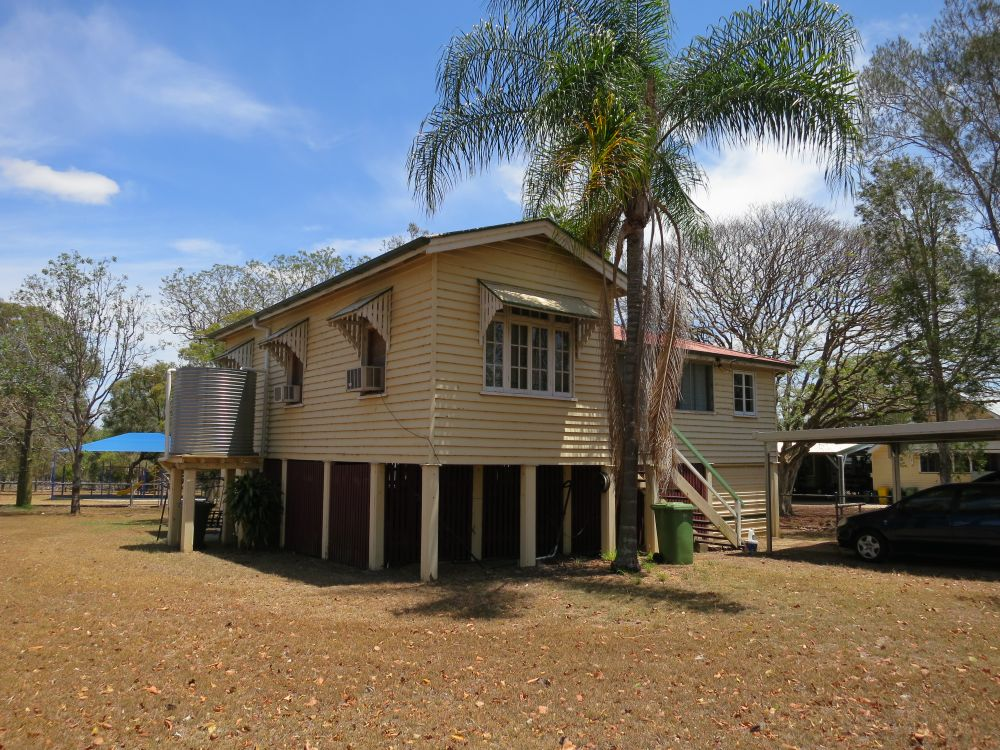
The 1934 Teacher's Residence, 2014

In 1934 a new teacher's residence was constructed in the southeast corner of Tarampa State School and the old residence (the original provisional school building) was sold and removed the following year. The new residence was constructed to a standard Department of Public Works design (Type D/R3) containing three bedrooms, a living room, kitchen with stove alcove, bathroom and a wrap-around verandah. The new residence was described as "...a well-built, modern house, replete with all conveniences, and not over-decorated. The work is a credit to the builders and a big improvement to the surroundings".

From the outset, teacher's residences were built to a standard regulated by the Board of General Education rather than a specific design, so the form varied with each commissioned architect. Initially, residences were most often attached as annexes to the classroom building, but from the 1880s were built as detached residences. These residences were similar to the vernacular Queensland house with few, if any, education-specific requirements or features.

Residences designed by the Department of Public Works' architects were typically of a higher-quality in design, materials and construction than most similarly scaled private residences. The detached teacher's residence was located within the school grounds at a distance from the teaching buildings, usually with a separate, fenced yard with gardens and trees. The designs ranged from one to four bedrooms and evolved simultaneously with the teaching buildings to keep up with modern needs and styles.

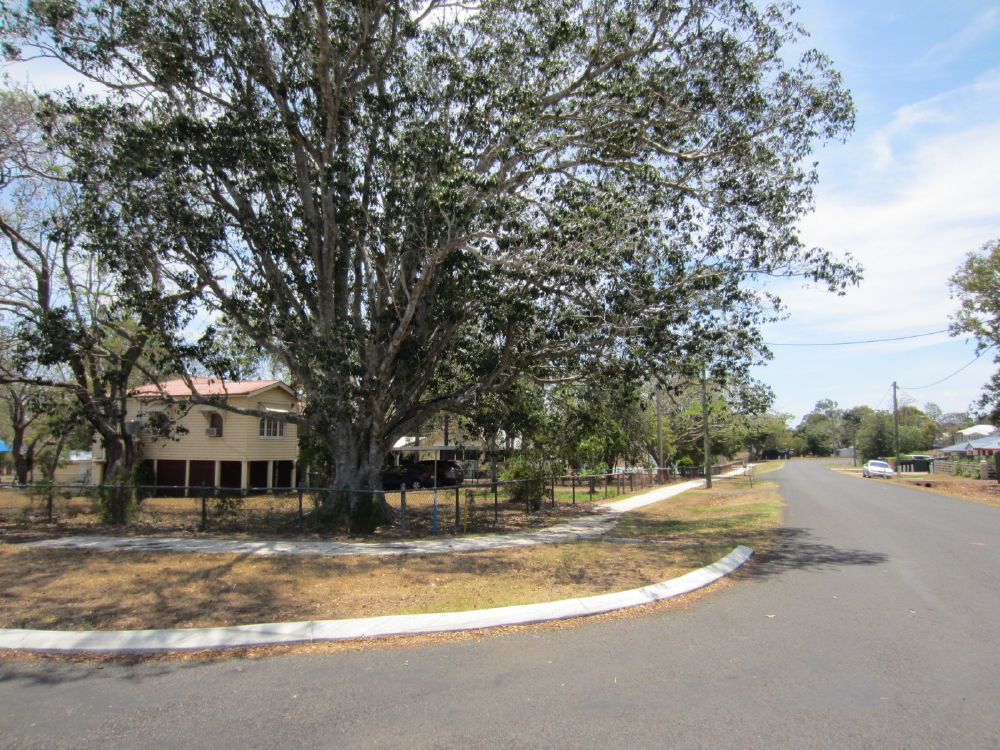
Mature fig tree in southeast corner of the grounds, 2014

The school celebrated the 75th jubilee of its official opening on 2 April 1955, with approximately 1300 people in attendance. A photograph taken on the day shows the Ferguson teaching building with an open front verandah, balustrade with horizontal rails and paling fence. The visitors' book was signed under the leopard tree (Flindersia maculosa) believed to have been planted c. 1894 by then Head Teacher, Edward Doran, and "Johnny Tarampa, King of the Trampah tribe" who died c. 1901. Other mature trees grow on the site, such as jacaranda (Jacaranda mimosifolia), Eucalyptus spp., and a large fig tree (Ficus sp.) in the garden of the teacher's residence.

The provision of outdoor play space was a result of the early and continuing commitment to play-based education, particularly in primary school. Trees and gardens were planted as part of the beautification of the school. In the 1870s, schools inspector William Boyd was critical of tropical schools and amongst his recommendations was the importance of the addition of shade trees in the playground. In addition, Arbor Day celebrations began in Queensland in 1890. Landscape elements were often constructed to standard designs and were intrinsic to Queensland Government education philosophies. Educationalists believed gardening and Arbor Days instilled in young minds the value of hard work and activity, improved classroom discipline, developed aesthetic tastes, and inspired people to stay on the land. Aesthetically designed gardens were encouraged by regional inspectors.

Tarampa's population fell from c. 1911 to the 1960s, especially with the decline in dairying after World War II, but rose again to 325 in 2011.

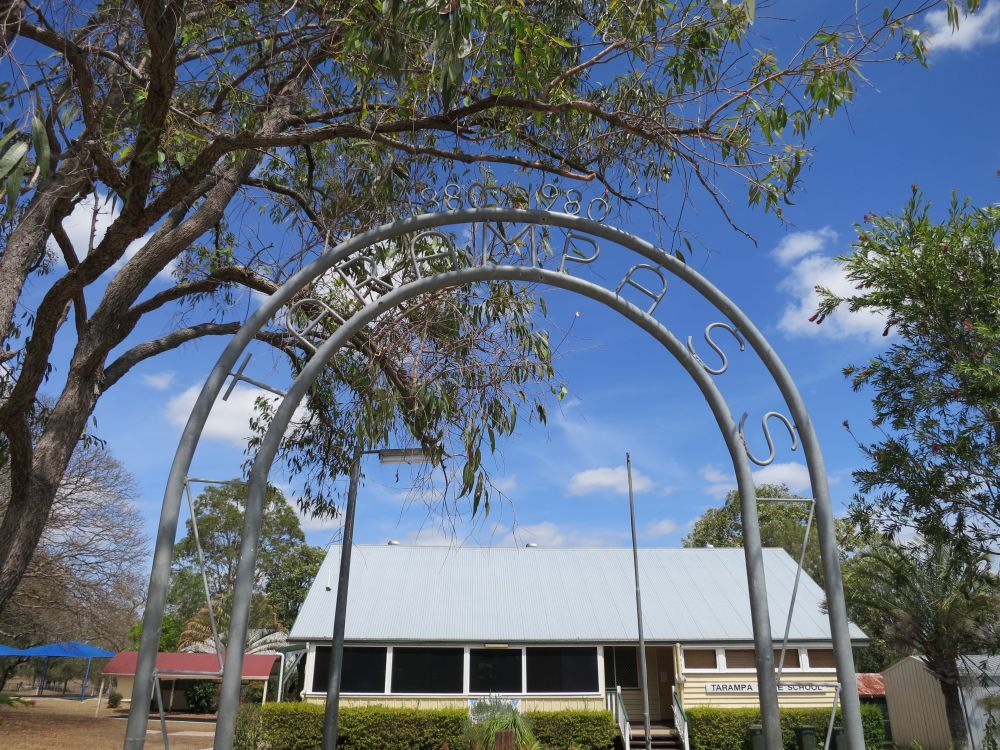
Entrance gate, 2014

Between the 1960s and the 1980s Queensland education was reformed and school buildings were altered as a result. The Education Act 1964 was a turning point and the first major update of Queensland education's governing legislation since 1875. Effectively, a new era of state education evolved, requiring new architectural responses. The Department of Education (as it had been renamed in 1957) continued to give the responsibility of building design to the architects of the Department of Public Works. With new educational philosophies, government policies and functional requirements combined with new architectural styles, materials and technologies, the evolution of standard designs became more fragmented. Rather than "improving" on the previous designs, architects began to design with inspiration drawn from new precedents. Fundamentally, timber construction was no longer favoured and buildings were no longer predominantly highset.

Some alterations to the school were made in the 1970s and 1980s. In 1977, the west verandah of the Ferguson teaching building was enclosed for library and health services purposes and the verandah stairs relocated. In 1981 the school's library and storeroom were remodelled. Drawings show the demountable building (T2000 on block plan) already in place with the original Ferguson teaching building used as a teaching space and a library, the front verandah used as a withdrawal area and health room, and the back verandah as a work/store room and staff room. The playshed had lattice applied to its eastern side and corrugated iron to its southern side.

Centenary celebrations in 1980 included a published history of the school.

In 2011, a multi-purpose building was constructed to replace the library housed in the Ferguson Teaching Building ('Block A'). The old library was converted for use by the school administration and as a resource centre. Other improvements to the school were also made including; bituminising the undercover area and re-cementing around that area, the installation of soft-fall in the playground and lattice work.

In 2015, the Tarampa State School continues to operate and retains the Ferguson building, playshed and residence. The school is important to the town having operated from the site since 1880 and as generations of Tarampa students have been taught there. Since establishment it has been a key social focus for the Tarampa community with the grounds and buildings having been the location of many social events.

== Description ==
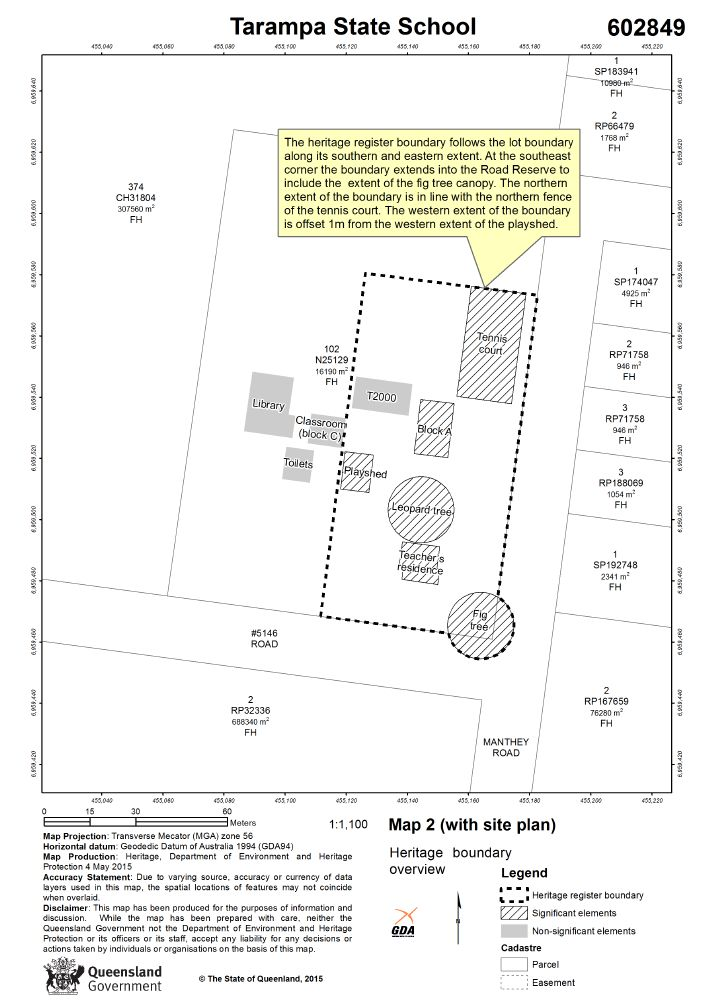
Site map, 2015

Tarampa State School is located in the small rural township of Tarampa in the Brisbane Valley. Accessed via Manthey Road, the school occupies a rectangular 1.62ha block surrounded by open farmland and private residences. The school complex comprises a Ferguson teaching building (1886, extended 1897), a playshed (1897), a teacher's residence (1934) and a large leopard tree (Flindersia maculosa, planted ca.1894) known to the school community as the "Dibby Dibby" tree, as well as other mature trees.

=== Ferguson teaching building (1886, extended 1897) ===
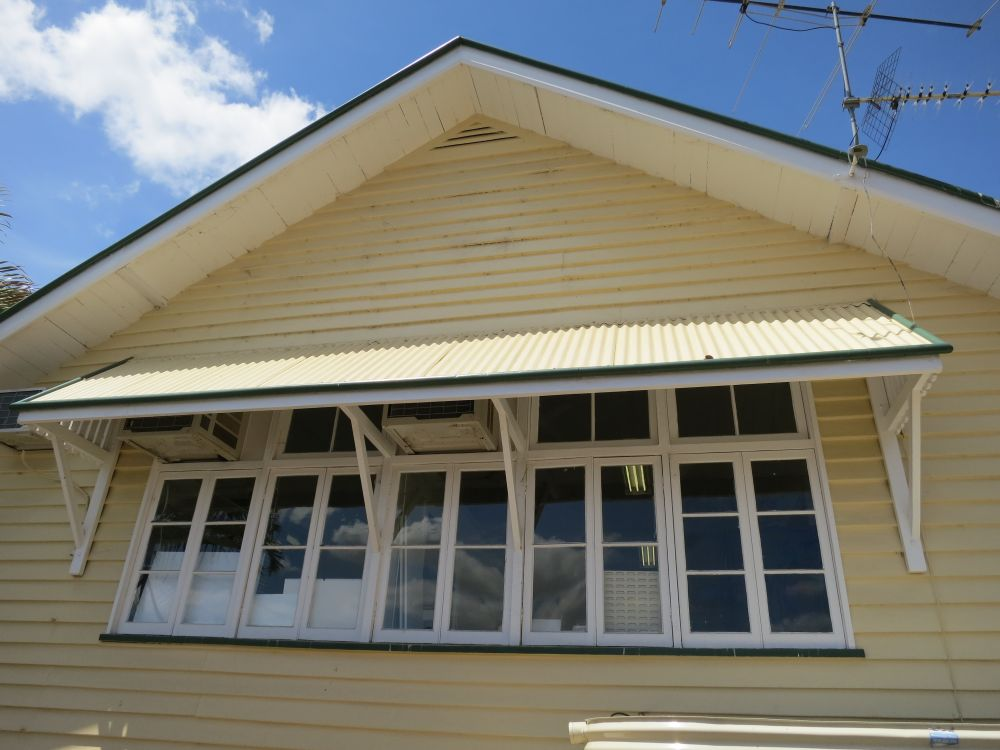
Window detail, north elevation, 2014

The Ferguson building stands near the centre of the front (eastern) boundary, facing east to Manthey Road. It is a small timber building with verandahs on the east and west sides (now enclosed). It is lowset on timber stumps with weatherboard-clad walls and a gable roof clad in corrugated metal sheeting. The gable end walls each have a large area of timber-framed casement windows with fanlights, sheltered by timber-framed hoods with battened cheeks. The apex of each gable has a panel of fixed timber louvres venting the roof space. The gable eaves are lined with timber boards.

The enclosed verandahs retain verandah posts and beams in some locations, beneath later cladding. On the east side, the main entrance is accessed via timber steps and consists of a central, unenclosed section of the verandah with an early timber door in the verandah wall. The north end of the east verandah is enclosed with weatherboards to form a small office, while the south end is enclosed with a solid balustrade and modern aluminium sliding windows. The raked verandah ceiling is lined with timber boards, except in the small office which has flat sheeting linings.

The west verandah has been completely enclosed. At the northern end is an early storeroom (possibly a former hatroom) with single-skin enclosing walls, accessed by a half-glazed timber door. Adjoining the storeroom is a recently enclosed section of verandah with a timber floor, weatherboard cladding to the verandah wall, and a raked ceiling lined with timber boards. The central and southern sections of the verandah have recent fit-outs and linings. An original doorway survives in the former verandah wall, retaining its tall, two-light, vertically centre pivoting fanlight windows. A wing wall in the southern section indicates the location of a former lavatory enclosure.

Originally one large classroom, the interior of the teaching building has been divided into two rooms by a single-skin timber partition lined with vertical timber boards. An early timber door connects the two rooms. The coved ceiling is lined with beaded timber boards and timber tie-beams with stop-chamfered edges are exposed within the space. A join in the ceiling lining in the northern room likely indicates the point from which the building was extended in 1897. The walls are generally lined with vertical, v-jointed tongue and groove boards. Some windows, doors and ceiling vents have been removed or sheeted over but their locations are visible in the wall and ceiling linings. Other windows have had their sashes removed and replaced with louvres.

=== Playshed (1897) ===
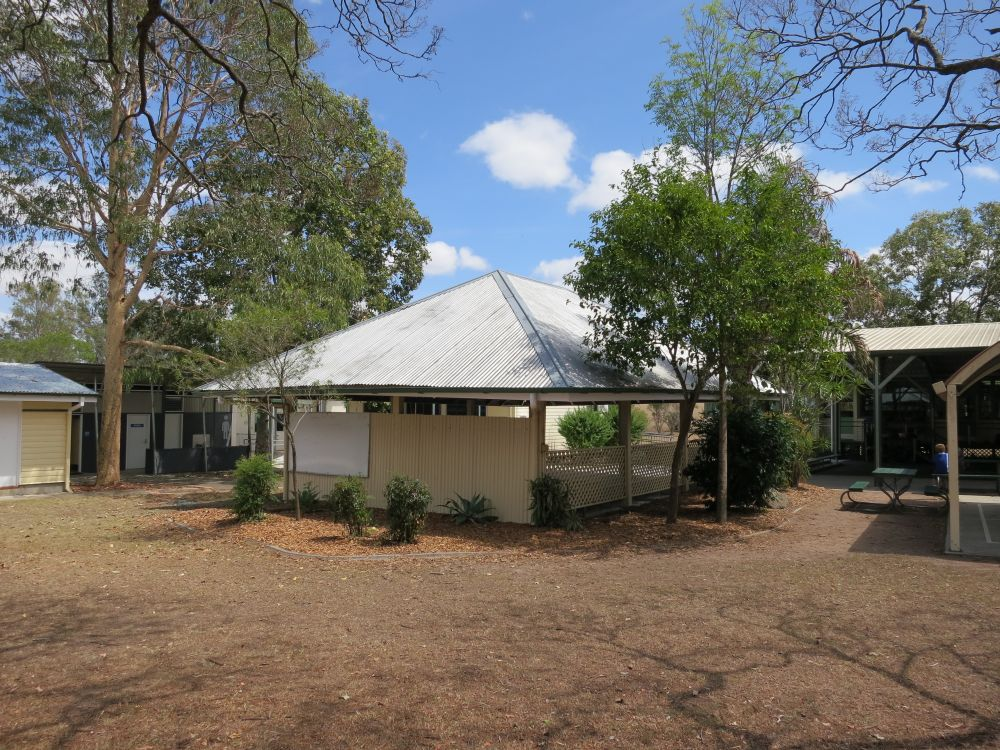
The playshed, 2014

The playshed, located to the south-west of the Ferguson building, is a small 10-post timber structure with a hipped roof clad with corrugated metal sheeting. The posts are braced to the roof framing by brackets and the roof framing is exposed. The eastern side is partially enclosed with timber lattice screens and the southern side is enclosed with corrugated metal sheeting.

=== Teacher's Residence (1934) ===
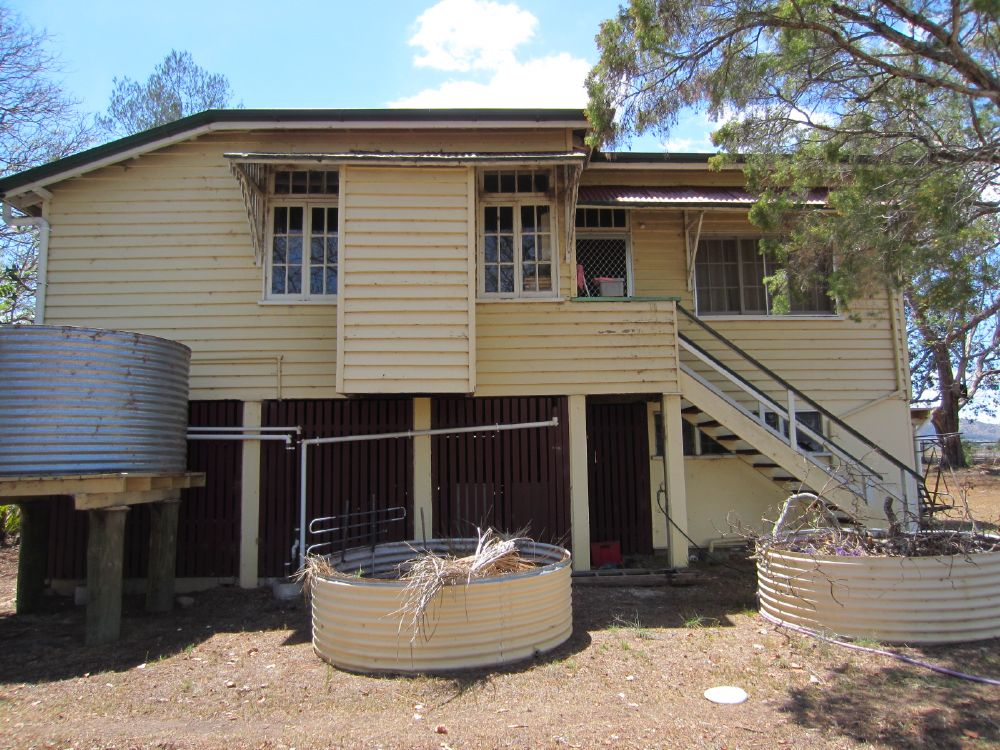
Rear of Teacher's Residence, 2014

The teacher's residence occupies its own rectangular yard in the southeast corner of the site. It is a highset timber-framed building on concrete stumps, clad with weatherboards and has a hipped and gabled roof clad with corrugated metal sheeting. The building faces east to Manthey Road and contains bedrooms and living rooms along the front and south sides, the kitchen with projecting stove alcove on the west (rear) side, and the toilet, bathroom and pantry in the north-west corner. The projecting, gabled front room has packed weatherboards to ventilate the roof space and the L-shaped front verandah, wrapping the front and north sides, is enclosed. The understorey is enclosed by timber batten screens and has a laundry room enclosure in the south-west corner. Replacement tank stands occupy the original rainwater tank locations.

The front and rear entrances are accessed by timber stairs and both have partially-glazed timber doors with multiple panes of textured glass. The front door (now an internal door) is high-waisted. The building has a variety of timber-framed windows, including six-light casements with fanlights, six-light casements with textured glass, and a set of nine-light sliding sashes. The enclosed verandah has banks of glass louvres and sets of three-light casements. Most windows have timber window hoods with battened cheeks.

The interior layout is intact, with a central hall running from front to back with rooms either side. Internal partitions are single-skin with exposed stud framing. Walls and ceilings are lined with v-jointed tongue and groove boards. The rooms retain original joinery, including modest skirtings, cornices and architraves. Internal doors are high-waisted with fanlights and doors to the former verandah are half-glazed, six-light French doors with fanlights. All early doors have original door hardware.

=== Grounds and views ===
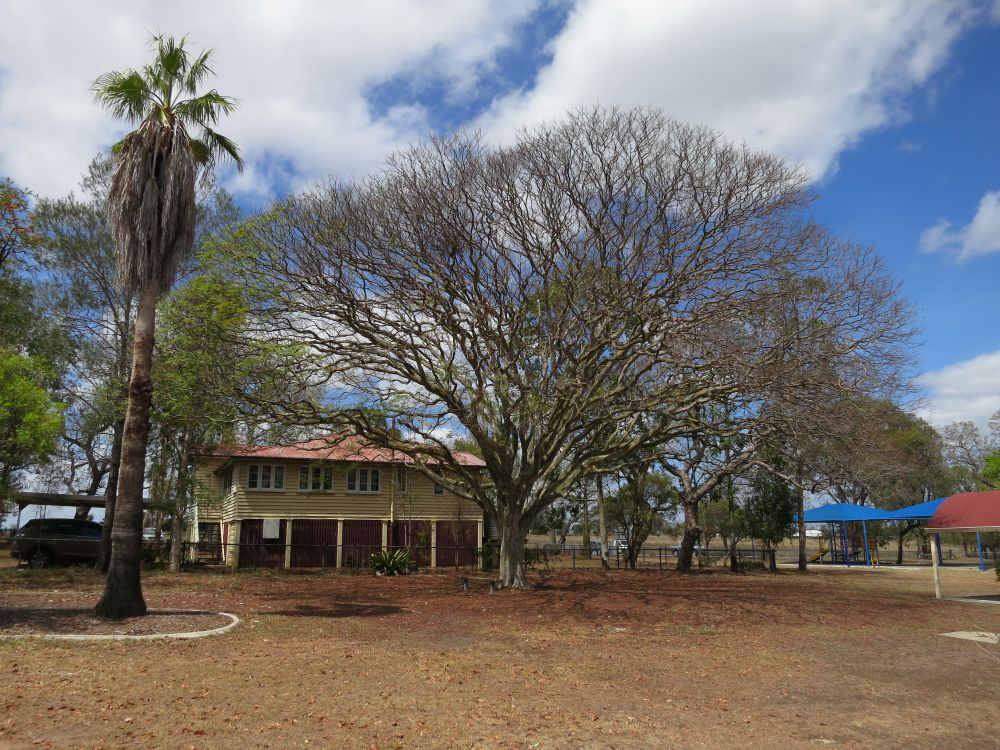
The "Dibby Dibby" tree, 2014

Established trees, gardens and pathways are located throughout the southern and eastern areas of the school grounds, while the northern and western school grounds remain open fields. A tennis court with a 1960s timber shelter shed is located along the front boundary on the northern side of the Ferguson teaching building. Several memorials are located within garden beds, including a cairn commemorating Australia's Bicentenary and a plaque commemorating the 125th anniversary of the school.

Significant trees are the large leopard tree ("Dibby Dibby" tree), which stands between the Ferguson building and the school residence, and a large fig (possibly rusty fig, ficus rubiginosa) in the southeast corner of the residence yard. Other mature tree varieties within the school and residence grounds include poinciana (Delonix regia), crows ash (flindersia australis), jacaranda (jacaranda mimosifolia), maple (acer sp.) and eucalyptus (eucalyptus spp.).

The school is prominent in its location and views of the surrounding countryside are obtained from within the school grounds.

== Heritage listing ==
Tarampa State School was listed on the Queensland Heritage Register on 1 May 2015 having satisfied the following criteria.

The place is important in demonstrating the evolution or pattern of Queensland's history.

Tarampa State School (established in 1880 as Tarampa Provisional School) is important in demonstrating the evolution of state education and its associated architecture in Queensland. It retains representative examples of standard government designs that were architectural responses to prevailing government education philosophies. At Tarampa State School these standard designs are: an early Ferguson-designed school building (1886), a playshed (1897) and a teacher's residence (1934) set within schools grounds with significant landscape elements including mature plantings and a tennis court.

The place is important in demonstrating the principal characteristics of a particular class of cultural places.

Tarampa State School is important in demonstrating the principal characteristics of early Queensland state schools with their later modifications. These include: generous, landscaped sites with mature shade trees, play areas and sporting facilities; and timber-framed buildings constructed to standard designs by the Queensland Government. The school is a good example of a modest, regional school complex.

The Ferguson teaching building (1886, extended c. 1897) is an excellent, intact example that retains its lowset, rectangular form, with front and rear verandahs (now enclosed), gable roof, louvred ventilation panels, coved ceiling, exposed timber tie beams and some early doors and windows.

The playshed (1897) has a hipped timber-framed roof supported on braced timber posts (with two sides partially enclosed).

The teacher's residence (1934) is an ideal, intact example of the residence type of its period - a highset timber-framed and clad building comprising three bedrooms, a living room, kitchen with stove alcove, bathroom and an L-shaped verandah (now enclosed).

The mature leopard tree (Flindersia maculosa) and fig tree (Ficus sp.) are fine examples of the shade trees planted in Queensland school grounds.

The place has a strong or special association with a particular community or cultural group for social, cultural or spiritual reasons.

Schools have always played an important part in Queensland communities. They typically retain significant and enduring connections with former pupils, parents, and teachers; provide a venue for social interaction and volunteer work; and are a source of pride, symbolising local progress and aspirations.

Tarampa State School has a strong and ongoing association with the Tarampa community. Operating since 1880, generations of its children have been taught there. The place is important for its contribution to the educational development of Tarampa and is a prominent community focal point and gathering place for social events with widespread community support.

== See also ==
- History of state education in Queensland
- List of schools in West Moreton
