= Lockyer Creek Railway Bridge (Clarendon) =

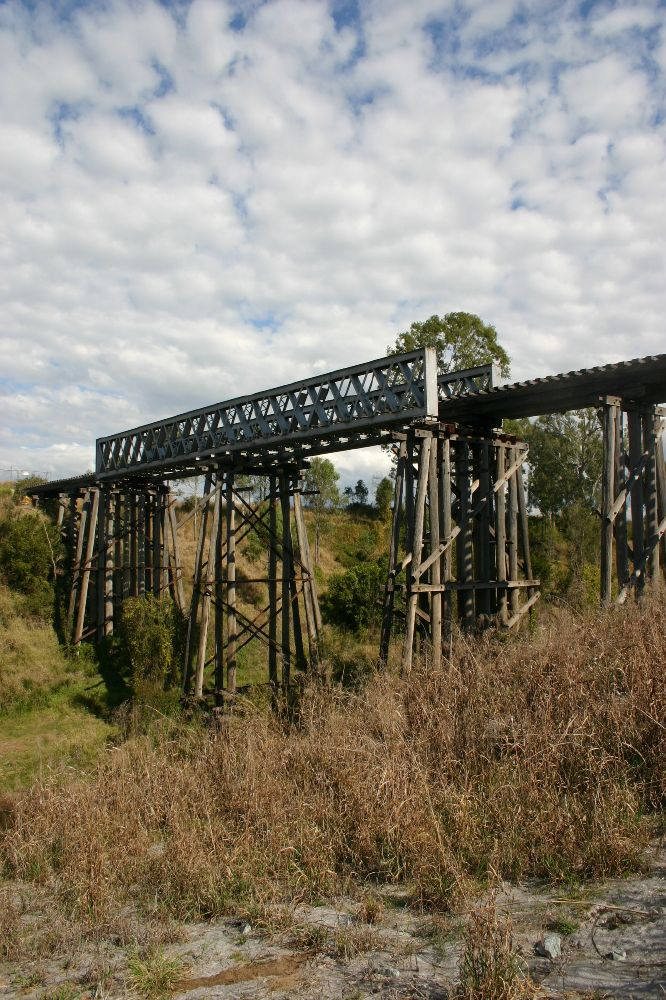
- Lockyer Creek Railway Bridge (Clarendon), 2008

- Location within Queensland Location within Australia
- 27.4199°S 152.5305°E
- Location: Brisbane Valley railway line, Clarendon, Somerset Region, Queensland, Australia

History
- Design period: 1870s–1890s (late 19th century)
- Built: 1885–1886

Site notes
- Architect: Henry Charles Stanley

Queensland Heritage Register
- Official name: Lockyer Creek Railway Bridge (Clarendon)
- Type: state heritage (built)
- Designated: 21 October 1992
- Reference no.: 600495
- Significant period: 1880s, 1932, 1968 (fabric); 1886–1993 (historical use)
- Significant components: pier/s (bridge)
- Builders: H A Brigg

Lockyer Creek Railway Bridge is a heritage-listed railway bridge on the Brisbane Valley railway line over Lockyer Creek at Clarendon, Somerset Region, Queensland, Australia. It was designed by Henry Charles Stanley and built from 1885 to 1886 by H A Brigg. It was added to the Queensland Heritage Register on 21 October 1992.

== History ==
The second section of the Brisbane Valley Branch line from Lowood to Esk was let on contract to H. A. Brigg on 2 December 1884 for £57,821. The line was opened for traffic between Lowood and Esk on 9 August 1886.

Operating the Brisbane Valley Branch was expensive because the light standard of the line limited engines to B15 standard. As there were many heavy grades on the line, more powerful locomotives could produce substantial savings in the number of trains needed. Using Great Depression relief labour to reduce the cost, strengthening the line to C16 and C17 standard was completed between 1931 and 1933. In 1932 a central timber pier was added to strengthen the 100-foot (30 m) lattice girder span.

In 1968 in preparation for the operation of 60-long-ton (61 t) diesel engine locomotives in both single and multiple operation, the longitudinal members were strengthened by the addition of 6-by-3-inch (152 mm × 76 mm) channels along each side and 9-by-5-inch (230 mm × 130 mm) transoms laid over the top. The timber piers supporting the 100-foot (30 m) span were provided with concrete bases. The railway closed for traffic in March 1993.

In late 2018 the bridge was opened to users of the Brisbane Valley Rail Trail.

== Description ==
The bridge features a half-through double x 2 lattice girder bridge on a straight alignment and carrying a single track. Its spans are:

- 2-by-2-by-20-foot (0.61 m × 0.61 m × 6.10 m) timber longitudinals, common timber trestles with 2 unbraced uprights (Pier 1), 3 single braced uprights (Pier 2) and 5 double braced uprights (Pier 3).
- 1-by-2-by-26-foot (0.30 m × 0.61 m × 7.92 m) timber longitudinals, common timber trestles.
- 1-by-2-by-100-foot (0.30 m × 0.61 m × 30.48 m) half-through double x2 lattice girders, channel strengthened timber longitudinals and transom top, timber piers at each end on concrete bases, strengthened with double timber pier at centre span.
- 3-by-2-by-26-foot (0.91 m × 0.61 m × 7.92 m) timber longitudinals, common timber trestles with 5 double braced uprights (Piers 6 and 7) and 4 single braced uprights (Pier 8).
- 3-by-2-by-20-foot (0.91 m × 0.61 m × 6.10 m) timber longitudinals, common timber trestles with 4 single braced uprights (Pier 8), 3 single braced uprights (Piers 9 and 10) and 2 unbraced uprights (Pier 11).

The approaches are timber girders.

== Heritage listing ==
Lockyer Creek Railway Bridge at Clarendon was listed on the Queensland Heritage Register on 21 October 1992 having satisfied the following criteria.

The place is important in demonstrating the evolution or pattern of Queensland's history.

The bridge with a half-through double x 2 lattice girder spans is one of the oldest existing metal truss bridges with Miva (1886) and Wide Bay Creek (1886), and the second extant of its type constructed in Queensland with the longest span of its type in Queensland between 1884 and 1932.

The place demonstrates rare, uncommon or endangered aspects of Queensland's cultural heritage.

This is one of the few major bridges on the Brisbane Valley Branch. Its design incorporating a 100-foot (30 m) lattice girder span supported on timber piers is similar in concept to bridges on the original Ipswich to Toowoomba line, opened in 1867, but on which all such bridges have long been removed. Although a single timber pier has been provided to strengthen the span effectively making two spans to carry heavier loads, it still shows the original mode of construction clearly.

The place is important in demonstrating a high degree of creative or technical achievement at a particular period.

The bridge with a half-through double x 2 lattice girder spans is one of the oldest existing metal truss bridges with Miva (1886) and Wide Bay Creek (1886), and the second extant of its type constructed in Queensland with the longest span of its type in Queensland between 1884 and 1932.

The place has a special association with the life or work of a particular person, group or organisation of importance in Queensland's history.

The design was associated with the Chief Engineer, Henry Charles Stanley.

== See also ==
- Lockyer Creek Railway Bridge (Lockyer)
- Lockyer Creek Railway Bridge (Murphys Creek)
