= Lake Clarendon Dam =

Dam in South-east Queensland, Australia

- Location of the dam in Queensland
- Interactive map of Lake Clarendon Dam
- Country: Australia
- Location: Lockyer Valley Region, South East Queensland
- Coordinates: 27°30′55″S 152°21′4″E
- Purpose: Irrigation
- Status: Operational
- Opening date: 1992
- Operator: SEQ Water

Dam and spillways
- Type of dam: Embankment dam
- Impounds: Off-stream
- Height: 13.1 m (43 ft)
- Length: 4,200 m (13,800 ft)
- Dam volume: 1,400×10^{3} m^{3} (49×10^{6} cu ft)
- Spillway type: Uncontrolled
- Spillway capacity: 62 m^{3}/s (2,200 cu ft/s)

Reservoir
- Creates: Lake Clarendon
- Total capacity: 24,276 ML (5.340×10^{9} imp gal; 6.413×10^{9} US gal)
- Catchment area: 3.4 km^{2} (1.3 sq mi)
- Surface area: 339 ha (840 acres)
- Maximum water depth: 13 m (43 ft)
- Normal elevation: 96 m (315 ft) AHD
- Website www.seqwater.com.au

The Lake Clarendon Dam is a rock and earth-fill embankment dam with an un-gated spillway located off-stream in the locality of Lake Clarendon in the Lockyer Valley Region, South East Queensland, Australia. The main purpose of the dam is for irrigation of the Lockyer Valley. The resultant impounded reservoir is called Lake Clarendon.

== Location and features ==
Located 10 kilometres (6.2 mi) northeast of Gatton, the Lake Clarendon Dam is part of a number of small dams built above the Lockyer Valley to supply water for irrigation purposes.

The 4,200 m (13,800 ft) long rock and earthfill structure has a maximum height of 13.1 m (43 ft) and an overflow spillway which diverts excess water into a series of open channels that eventually flow into the Lockyer Creek. The dam creates a reservoir, Lake Clarendon, with a storage capacity of 24,276 megalitres (5.340×10^{9} imp gal; 6.413×10^{9} US gal) and a maximum surface area of 339 hectares (840 acres). The dam is managed by SEQ Water.

Completed in 1992, by mid-2006 the dam was empty due to drought conditions in Australia. In January 2011, the dam was over 80% full according to the Queensland Water Commission website.

== Recreation ==
A Stocked Impoundment Permit is no longer required to fish in the reservoir. Lake Clarendon was removed from the SIP scheme in 2012.

== See also ==
- List of dams in Queensland
