= William Pagan (railway engineer) =

Australian railway engineer

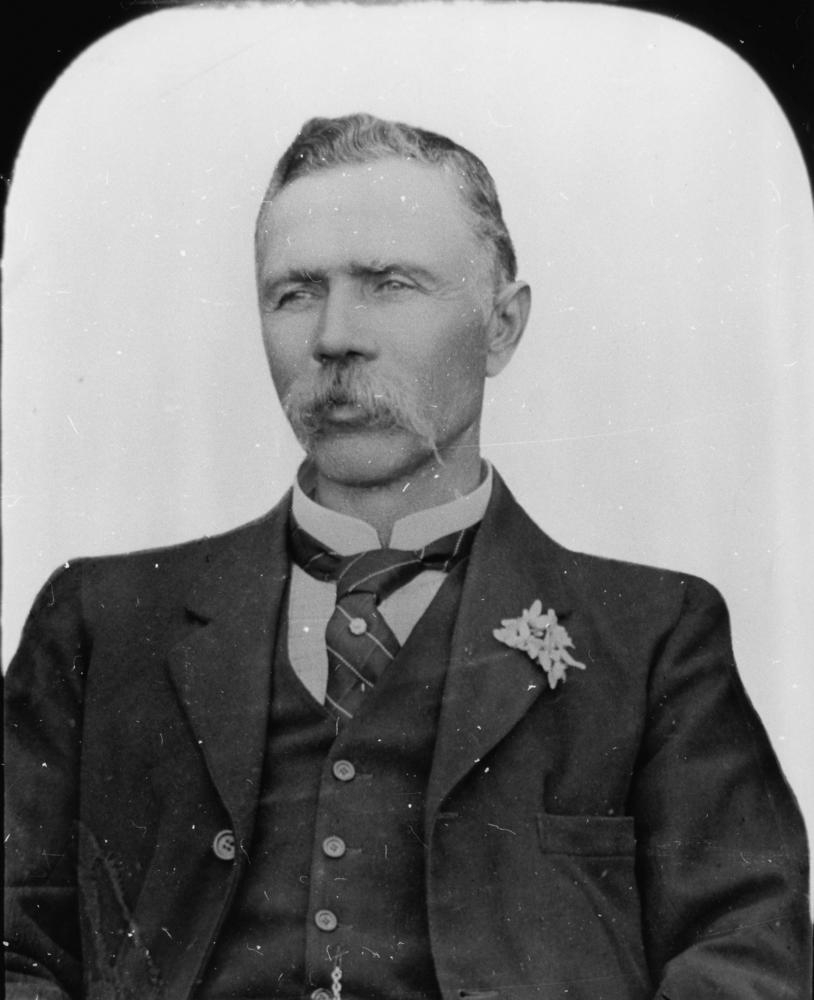
William Pagan, 1903

William Pagan (1849–1924) was a railway engineer in Queensland, Australia. He designed many railway bridges, some of which are now heritage-listed.

== Early life ==
William Pagan was born in Holestane, Dumfriesshire, Scotland on 27 July 1849, the son of Allan Cunningham Pagan and his wife Jane (née Shaw).

== Railway career ==
On 21 January 1882, Pagan was appointed as a District Engineer with the Queensland Railways Department. In 1889 he became the Principal Assistant to the Chief Engineer in Brisbane. He was appointed Chief Engineer in 1902 and then Deputy Commissioner in 1911. In 1915, he transferred to the Townsville division.

== Later life ==
Pagan retired in 1917 and moved to Southport, Queensland. There he served as an alderman on the Southport Town Council for 5 years.

He died on 9 September 1924 at Southport. He was buried at Southport Cemetery on 11 September 1924.

== Significant works ==
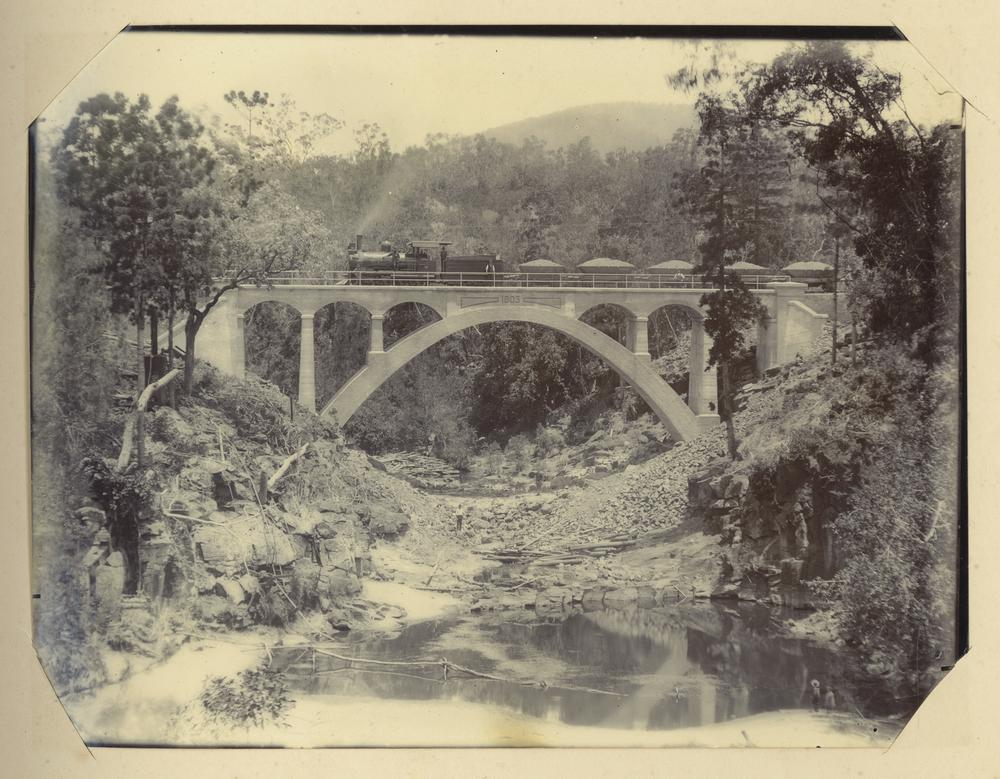
- Steam train passes over the completed Deep Creek railway bridge, Gayndah district, 1905 Deep Creek railway bridge was constructed as part of the railway line built from Degilbo to Wetheron. StateLibQld 2 255954
  1899: Swansons Rail Bridge
- 1905: Deep Creek Railway Bridge
- 1906: Ideraway Creek Railway Bridge
- 1906: Steep Rocky Creek Railway Bridge
- 1909: Lockyer Creek Railway Bridge (Lockyer)
- 1910: Lockyer Creek Railway Bridge (Murphys Creek)

The Official Register of Engineering Heritage Markers listed

- Degilbo-Mundubbera Railway Bridges in October 2016. A total of 12 bridges built between 1905 and 1914, situated on the Mungar Junction to Monto railway line, are associated with William Pagan and are recognized with one Engineering Heritage Marker representing the "best example of a collection of historic railway bridges in Australia".
