= Lockyer Creek Railway Bridge (Murphys Creek) =

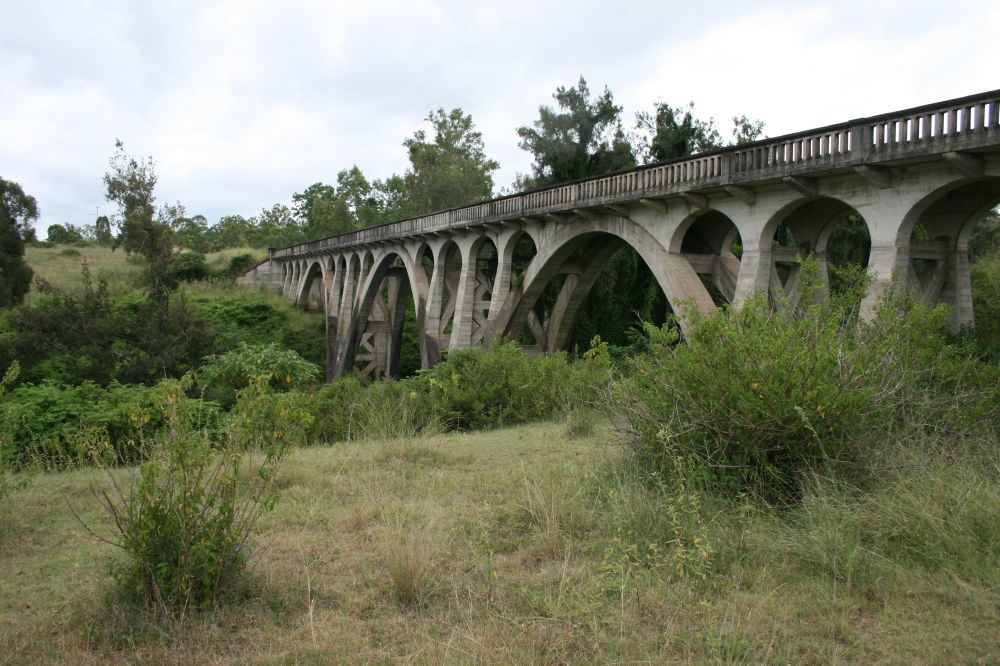
- Lockyer Creek Railway Bridge at Murphys Creek, 2009

- Location within Queensland Location within Australia
- 27.493°S 152.0821°E
- Location: Toowoomba–Helidon Line over Lockyer Creek at Murphys Creek, Lockyer Valley Region, Queensland, Australia

History
- Design period: 1900–1914 (early 20th century)
- Built: c. 1910–1911

Site notes
- Architect: William Pagan

Queensland Heritage Register
- Official name: Lockyer Creek Railway Bridge (Guinn Park)
- Type: state heritage (built)
- Designated: 21 October 1992
- Reference no.: 600515
- Significant period: 1910s (fabric)
- Significant components: pier/s (bridge), abutments – railway bridge

Lockyer Creek Railway Bridge (Murphys Creek) is a heritage-listed railway bridge on the Toowoomba–Helidon line over Lockyer Creek at Murphys Creek, Lockyer Valley Region, Queensland, Australia. It was designed by William Pagan and built from c. 1910 to 1911. It was added to the Queensland Heritage Register on 21 October 1992.

== History ==
The railway opened for traffic between Helidon and Toowoomba on 1 May 1867. From the 1870s there has been a continuing process of improving the Main Line between Brisbane and Toowoomba because of its importance as a major arterial route. As part of that process, which required the replacement of original bridges to carry heavier loads, construction work began in 1909 on a reinforced concrete arch bridge over Lockyer Creek at 77 miles 55 chains (125.0 km) immediately following the construction of one at 75 miles 48 chains (121.7 km). Design of the innovative bridge was completed and signed by Chief Engineer, William Pagan on 31 March 1910. The bridge and deviation were completed and brought into use on 21 December 1911.

== Description ==
A concrete arch bridge aligned on a straight alignment and carrying a single track on a ballasted deck. Its spans are:

- 2x15 feet (4.6 m) reinforced concrete arches, concrete abutment, common concrete piers
- 1x74 feet (23 m) reinforced concrete arch supporting 2x12 feet (3.7 m) and 1 by 13 feet (0.30 m × 3.96 m) reinforced concrete spandrel arches, common concrete piers
- 1x90 feet (27 m) reinforced concrete arch supporting 2x13 feet (4.0 m) and 2x12 feet (3.7 m) reinforced concrete spandrel arches, common concrete piers
- 1x74 feet (23 m) reinforced concrete arch supporting 1x13 feet (4.0 m)and 2 by 12 feet (0.61 m × 3.66 m) reinforced concrete spandrel arches, common concrete piers
- 3x15 feet (4.6 m) reinforced concrete arches, common concrete piers, concrete abutment

The spandrel columns are arranged in pairs, one for each arch rib, with crossbracing in concrete. The arch ribs are parabolic of rectangular section. There is a concrete balustrade. The whole structure is in cast-in-situ concrete.

== Heritage listing ==
Lockyer Creek Railway Bridge was listed on the Queensland Heritage Register on 21 October 1992 having satisfied the following criteria.

The place is important in demonstrating the evolution or pattern of Queensland's history.

This reinforced concrete arched bridge on a straight alignment has one of the largest spans of its type in Australia.

The place is important because of its aesthetic significance.

It has an innovative and aesthetically pleasing design.

The place is important in demonstrating a high degree of creative or technical achievement at a particular period.

This reinforced concrete arched bridge on a straight alignment has one of the largest spans of its type in Australia.

The place has a special association with the life or work of a particular person, group or organisation of importance in Queensland's history.

Its innovative and aesthetically pleasing design was associated with the Chief Engineer, William Pagan.

== See also ==
- Lockyer Creek Railway Bridge (Clarendon)
- Lockyer Creek Railway Bridge (Lockyer)
