= Lockyer Creek Railway Bridge (Lockyer) =

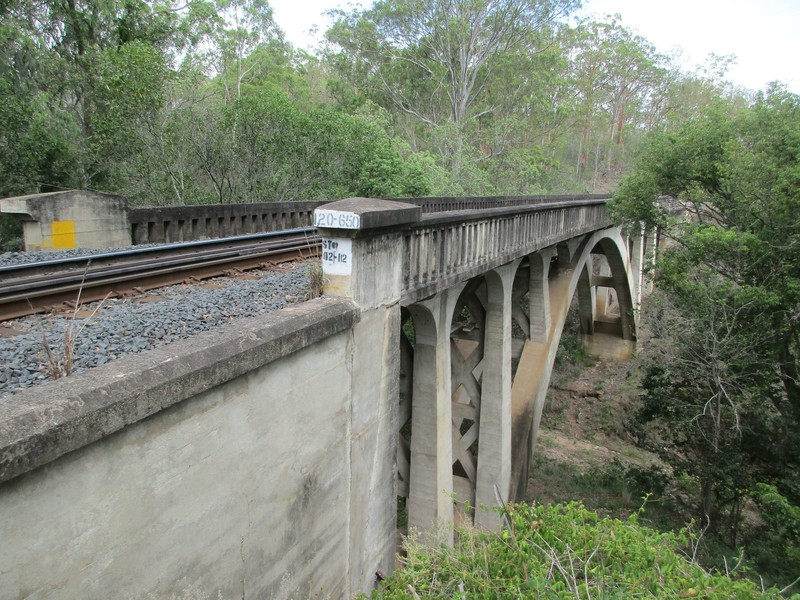
- Lockyer Creek Railway Bridge, 2016

- Location within Queensland Location within Australia
- 27.518°S 152.0885°E
- Location: Toowoomba–Helidon Line over Lockyer Creek at Lockyer, Lockyer Valley Region, Queensland, Australia

History
- Design period: 1900–1914 (early 20th century)
- Built: 1909–1910

Site notes
- Architect: William Pagan

Queensland Heritage Register
- Official name: Lockyer Creek Railway Bridge (Lockyer)
- Type: state heritage (built)
- Designated: 21 October 1992
- Reference no.: 600513
- Significant period: 1900s (fabric)
- Significant components: abutments - railway bridge, pier/s (bridge)

Lockyer Creek Railway Bridge (Lockyer) is a heritage-listed railway bridge on the Toowoomba–Helidon railway line over Lockyer Creek at Lockyer, Lockyer Valley Region, Queensland, Australia. It was designed by William Pagan and built from 1909 to 1910. It was added to the Queensland Heritage Register on 21 October 1992.

== History ==
This bridge was built in 1910 as part of the Brisbane–Toowoomba railway and was one of three railway bridges constructed over Lockyer Creek.

The railway opened for traffic between Helidon and Toowoomba on 1 May 1867. From the 1870s there has been a continuing process of improving the Main Line between Brisbane and Toowoomba because of its importance as a major arterial route. As part of that process, which required the replacement of original bridges to carry heavier loads, construction work began in 1908 on a new bridge and deviation over the Lockyer Creek tributary at 75 miles 48 chains (121.7 km). The design for the innovative reinforced concrete arch bridge was completed and signed by Chief Engineer, William Pagan on 2 February 1909. The bridge and deviation were completed and brought into use on 18 July 1910.

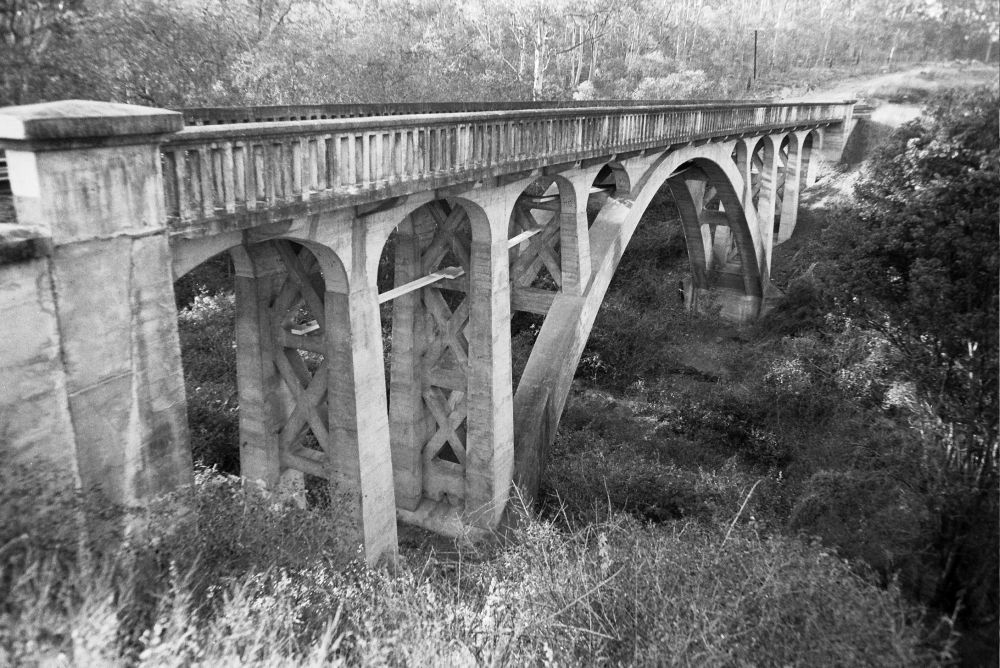
Lockyer Creek Railway Bridge

The use of concrete arches for railway bridges is a distinctive feature in Queensland and South Australia. The first concrete bridge in Queensland was constructed at Petrie Terrace in 1897. Between 1900 and 1913, six arch concrete railway bridges were constructed in Queensland approximating with the term in office of William Pagan as Chief Engineer of Railways and it is believed that he was responsible for their design. The first two, at Rangeview, near Toowoomba and at Deep Creek, Chowey, followed the form of a stone arch bridge. Later bridges were more innovative in design and this bridge was the second reinforced concrete arch rail bridge in Australia, following the 1906 bridge built at Steep Rocky Creek near Gayndah. The Lockyer bridge has a single main span of 27.4 metres (90 ft), about the same as the maximum span of Lockyer Creek, which was the third largest span of Australian arch bridges built at the time of construction.

== Description ==
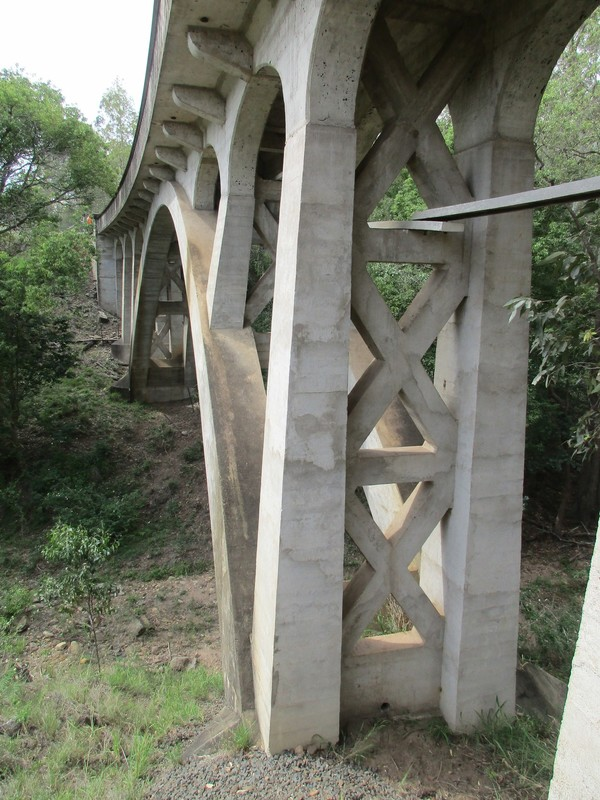
Concrete arches, 2016

The Lockyer Creek Railway Bridge spans a dry gully on the eastern bank of Lockyer Creek, 1 kilometre (0.62 mi) south south east of Lockyer. It is a concrete arch bridge aligned on a 12 chains (790 ft; 240 m) curve and carrying a single track on a ballasted deck. Its spans are:

- 2x14 feet (4.3 m) reinforced concrete arches, concrete abutment, common concrete piers
- 1x90 feet (27 m) reinforced concrete arch supporting 2x13 feet (4.0 m) and 2x10 feet (3.0 m) reinforced concrete spandrel arches, common concrete piers
- 2x14 feet (4.3 m)reinforced concrete arches, common concrete piers, concrete abutment

The spandrel columns are arranged in pairs, one for each arch rib, with crossbracing in concrete. The arch ribs are parabolic of rectangular section. There is a concrete balustrade. The whole structure is in cast-in-situ concrete.

== Heritage listing ==
Lockyer Creek Railway Bridge (Lockyer) was listed on the Queensland Heritage Register on 21 October 1992 having satisfied the following criteria.

The place is important in demonstrating the evolution or pattern of Queensland's history.

The Lockyer Creek railway bridge at Lockyer demonstrates the development of railways in Queensland, being an example of the way in which this important early railway line was upgraded to meet the requirements of the early 20th century. It illustrates the skill with which the technology of the era was used to solve the problems of climatic conditions and terrain encountered in this process.

The place is important because of its aesthetic significance.

The design of the bridge is aesthetically pleasing as well as functional and its arches form an attractive contrast with the vegetation of its setting over a gully.

The place is important in demonstrating a high degree of creative or technical achievement at a particular period.

This Lockyer Creek Railway Bridge at Lockyer was built to an innovative design, being only the second reinforced concrete arched bridge designed in Australia. It was one of a series of concrete arch bridges built for the Queensland railways between 1900 and 1913 and is unusual in construction for an Australian bridge, having separate twin parabolic arch ribs and braced concrete spandrel columns.

The place has a special association with the life or work of a particular person, group or organisation of importance in Queensland's history.

The bridge is an important example of the work of William Pagan, Chief Engineer for Railways and a major figure in the early history of engineering in Queensland.

== See also ==
- Lockyer Creek Railway Bridge (Clarendon)
- Lockyer Creek Railway Bridge (Murphys Creek)
