= Lowood, Queensland =

Lowood
- Town
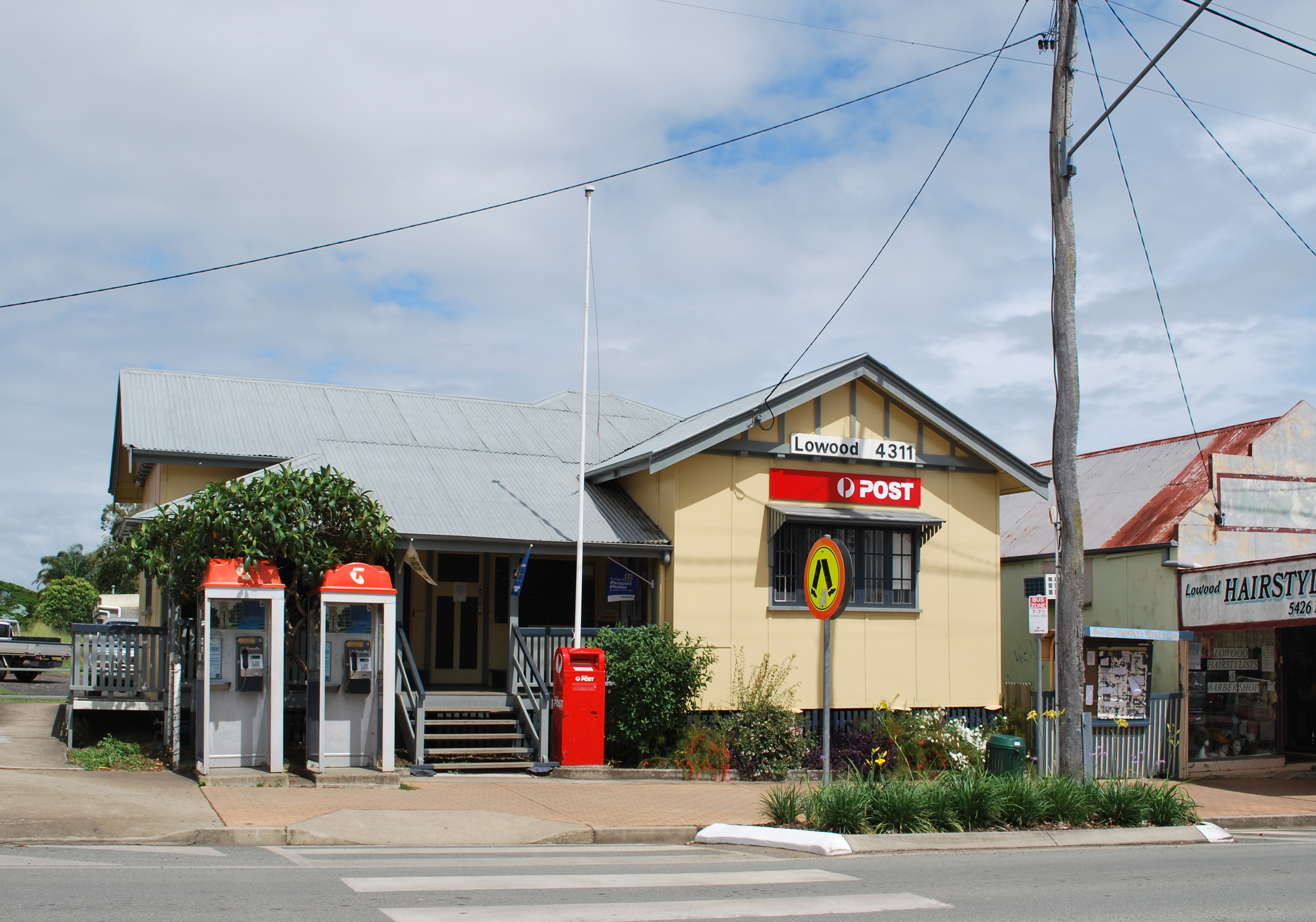
- Post office

- Interactive map of Lowood
- Coordinates: 27.4627°S 152.5783°E
- Country: Australia
- State: Queensland
- LGA: Somerset Region
- Location: 30.7 km (19.1 mi) NW of Ipswich; 40.5 km (25.2 mi) SSE of Esk; 69 km (43 mi) W of Brisbane
- Established: 1872

Government
  - State electorate: Lockyer
  - Federal division: Blair

Area
  - Total: 26.7 km^{2} (10.3 sq mi)

Population
  - Total: 4,082 (2021 census)
  - Density: 152.88/km^{2} (396.0/sq mi)
- Time zone: UTC+10:00 (AEST)
- Postcode: 4311
Localities around Lowood
| Clarendon | Patrick Estate | Wivenhoe Pocket |
| Rifle Range | Lowood | Vernor |
| Tarampa | Tarampa | Glamorgan Vale |

Lowood is a rural town and locality in the Somerset Region, Queensland, Australia. In the 2021 census, the locality of Lowood had a population of 4,082 people.

== Geography ==
The town is on the Brisbane River, 66 km (41 mi) west of the state capital, Brisbane, and 31 km (19 mi) north of Ipswich.

Due to its proximity to Brisbane and Ipswich, Lowood is becoming an area for hobby farmers and residential commuters.

== History ==
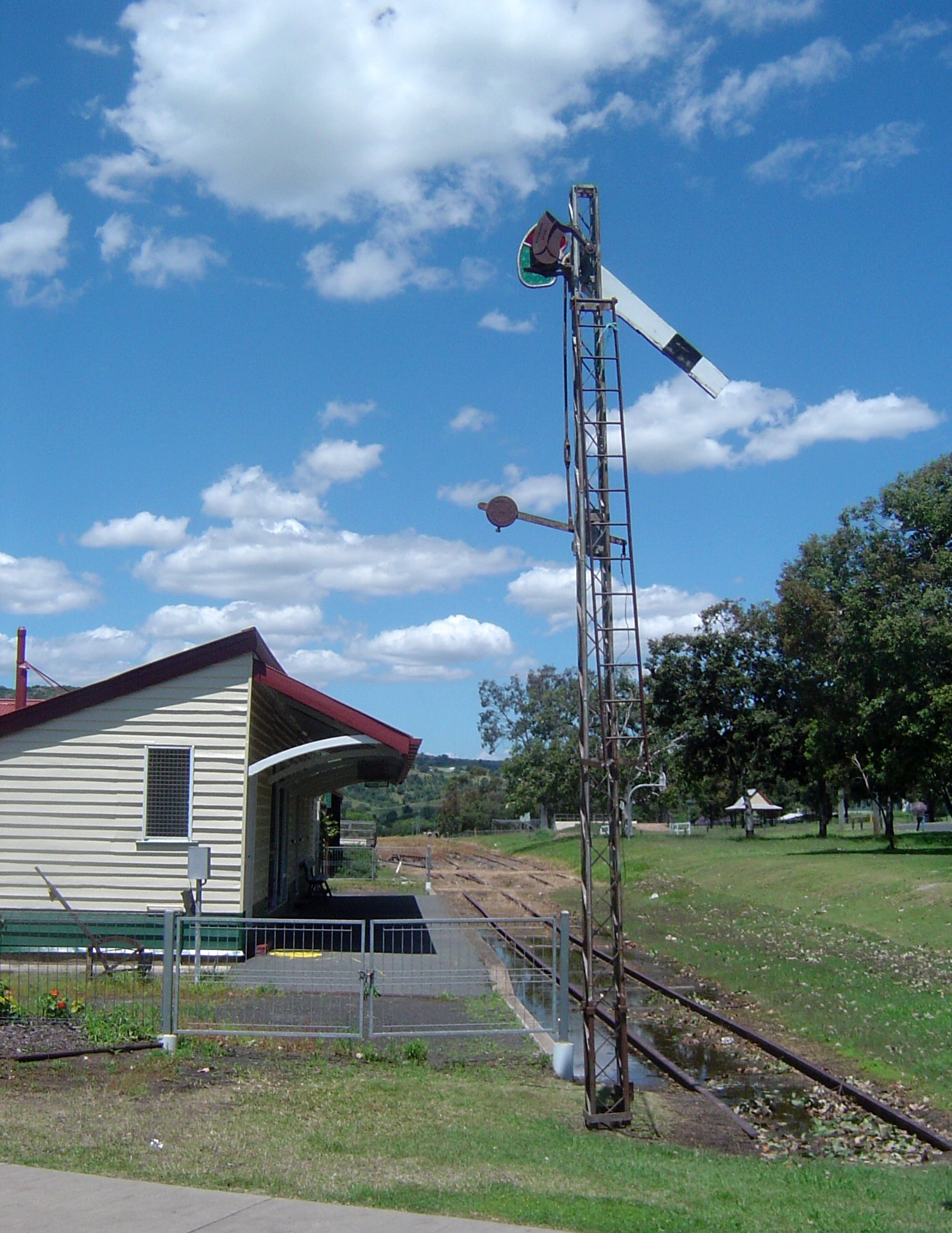
Intact but abandoned Lowood railway station – the railway line and grassed area are now the Jean Bray Carpark.

Lowood railway station (27.4632°S 152.5816°E) was established as the first terminus of the Brisbane Valley branch railway in 1884 and the town grew from the subdivision around the new railway station. The name Lowood is derived from the "low woods" of brigalow in the Lowood area, as opposed to the taller trees elsewhere in the Brisbane Valley. The name Lowood replaced local names of The Scrub and Cairnhill.

Lowood Post Office opened on 15 October 1888 (a receiving office had been open from 1884).

Cairnhill Provisional School opened on 29 June 1881. On 1 April 1889 it become Lowood State School. On 29 January 1963 a secondary department was opened, which closed in 1983 when Lowood State High School opened.

In 1919, 27 building sites in Morningside Estate were advertised for auction by Kavanagh & Smith Auctioneers. The auction was for resubs 1 to 27 of sub 5 of resub 1 of subs 1A & 3 of resub 2 of sub A of portion 319 (Tarampa). A map produced to advertise the auction shows Morningside Estate is on Peace Street and is close to Lowood Railway Station, the hospital and the state school.

During World War II, an airfield called Lowood, which was actually located at Mount Tarampa, was the site of a military airfield operated by the Royal Australian Air Force. No. 71 Squadron operated from the airfield during 1943, conducting coastal patrol and naval convoy escort missions. After the war, the airfield was converted into a motor-racing circuit, the Lowood Airfield Circuit, and operated for 20 years, the highlight hosting the 1960 Australian Grand Prix. The airfield no longer exists, but a small memorial marks its previous location.

Lowood State High School opened on 24 January 1983 replacing the secondary department attached to Lowood State School in 1963.

The Lowood public library opened in 2000.

== Demographics ==
In the 2006 census, the town of Lowood had a population of 1,010 people.

In the 2011 census, the locality of Lowood had a population of 3,336 people.

In the 2016 census, the locality of Lowood had a population of 4,159 people.

In the 2021 census, the locality of Lowood had a population of 4,082 people.

== Heritage listings ==
Lowood has a number of heritage-listed sites, including:

- 12 Railway Street 27.4618°S 152.5814°E: former Royal Bank of Queensland, built sometime between 1901 and 1917, the former bank is now a dental surgery.

== Education ==
Lowood State School is a government primary (Early Childhood to Year 6) school for boys and girls at 32 Peace Street (27.4657°S 152.5816°E). In 2018, the school had an enrolment of 279 students with 24 teachers (23 full-time equivalent) and 17 non-teaching staff (13 full-time equivalent). It includes a special education program.

Lowood State High School is a government secondary (7–12) school for boys and girls at 28 Prospect Street (27.4671°S 152.5824°E). In 2018, the school had an enrolment of 747 students with 68 teachers (67 full-time equivalent) and 39 non-teaching staff (29 full-time equivalent). It includes a special education program.

== Transport ==
Following the withdrawal of the railmotor service to Toogoolawah in 1989, a substitute bus service to Ipswich was introduced by Queensland Rail (QR). Two services are in the morning and return services are in the late afternoon. Time tables are available from QR.

== Amenities ==
The Somerset Regional Council operates a public library at the corner of Michel and Main Streets (27.4634°S 152.5802°E).

The Lowood branch of the Queensland Country Women's Association meets at 106 Main Street (27.4635°S 152.5806°E).

The Fernvale Lowood Uniting Church is at 1503 Brisbane Valley Highway in Fernvale.

== Attractions ==
Nearby Lake Wivenhoe is a popular place for activities such as boating and fishing.

== See also ==
- No. 71 Squadron RAAF
