= Electoral results for the district of Aubigny =

This is a list of electoral results for the electoral district of Aubigny in Queensland state elections.

== Members for Aubigny ==
Member	Party	Term
Edward Wilmot Pechey		1873–1877
Patrick Perkins	Conservative	1877–1884
James Campbell	Conservative	1884–1893
William Lovejoy	Opposition	1893–1894
William Thorn	Opposition	1894–1904
John O'Brien	Labor	1904–1907
Donald McIntyre	Kidstonites	1907–1908
William Thorn	Farmer's Rep.	1908–1909
William Thorn	Liberal	1909–1912
Alfred James Luke	Liberal	1912–1915
Arthur Edward Moore	Farmers' Union	1915–1917
Arthur Edward Moore	National	1917–1919
Arthur Edward Moore	Country	1919–1925
Arthur Edward Moore	Country and Progressive National	1925–1936
Arthur Edward Moore	Country	1936–1941
Jim Sparkes	Country	1941–1960
Les Diplock	Queensland Labor	1960–1962
Les Diplock	Democratic Labor	1962–1972

== Election results ==
=== Elections in the 1960s ===
1969 Queensland state election: Aubigny
Party	Candidate	Votes	%	±%
Queensland Labor	Les Diplock	5,065	55.4	−0.9
Country	Peter Paull	2,646	28.9	−2.2
Labor	Thomas Wilson	1,430	15.6	+3.0
Total formal votes		9,141	99.0	+0.2
Informal votes		93	1.0	−0.2
Turnout		9,234	94.9	−0.5
Two-candidate-preferred result
Queensland Labor	Les Diplock	5,780	63.2	+0.6
Country	Peter Paull	3,361	36.8	−0.6
Queensland Labor hold		Swing	+0.6	

1966 Queensland state election: Aubigny
Party	Candidate	Votes	%	±%
Queensland Labor	Les Diplock	5,123	56.3	+3.9
Country	John Corfe	2,828	31.1	−3.0
Labor	Peter Fitzpatrick	1,150	12.6	−0.9
Total formal votes		9,101	98.8	−0.2
Informal votes		113	1.2	+0.2
Turnout		9,214	95.4	−0.6
Two-candidate-preferred result
Queensland Labor	Les Diplock	5,697	62.6	+3.0
Country	John Corfe	3,404	37.4	−3.0
Queensland Labor hold		Swing	+3.0	

1963 Queensland state election: Aubigny
Party	Candidate	Votes	%	±%
Queensland Labor	Les Diplock	4,644	52.4	+6.5
Country	Somerset Thorn	3,017	34.0	−8.9
Labor	Bruce Strachan	1,198	13.5	+2.3
Total formal votes		8,859	99.0	−0.4
Informal votes		92	1.0	+0.4
Turnout		8,951	96.0	+2.4
Two-candidate-preferred result
Queensland Labor	Les Diplock	5,280	59.6	
Country	Somerset Thorn	3,579	40.4	
Queensland Labor hold		Swing	N/A	

1960 Queensland state election: Aubigny
Party	Candidate	Votes	%	±%
Queensland Labor	Les Diplock	4,024	45.9	+45.9
Country	Jim Sparkes	3,763	42.9	−57.1
Labor	Bruce Strachan	981	11.2	+11.2
Total formal votes		8,768	99.4	
Informal votes		52	0.6	
Turnout		8,820	93.6	
Queensland Labor gain from Country		Swing	N/A	

=== Elections in the 1950s ===
1957 Queensland state election: Aubigny
Party	Candidate	Votes	%	±%
Country	Jim Sparkes	unopposed		
Country hold		Swing		

1956 Queensland state election: Aubigny
Party	Candidate	Votes	%	±%
Country	Jim Sparkes	6,409	72.6	+13.3
Labor	William Alexander	2,423	27.4	+27.4
Total formal votes		8,832	99.3	+0.2
Informal votes		64	0.7	−0.2
Turnout		8,896	95.5	+0.5
Country hold		Swing	N/A	

1953 Queensland state election: Aubigny
Party	Candidate	Votes	%	±%
Country	Jim Sparkes	5,240	59.3	−14.3
Independent	Victor Sullivan	3,601	40.7	+40.7
Total formal votes		8,841	99.1	−0.4
Informal votes		78	0.9	+0.4
Turnout		8,919	95.0	+1.8
Country hold		Swing	N/A	

1950 Queensland state election: Aubigny
Party	Candidate	Votes	%	±%
Country	Jim Sparkes	6,537	73.6	
Labor	Christopher Schull	1,829	20.6	
Independent	George Legge	514	5.8	
Total formal votes		8,880	99.5	
Informal votes		43	0.5	
Turnout		8,923	93.2	
Country hold		Swing		

=== Elections in the 1940s ===
1947 Queensland state election: Aubigny
Party	Candidate	Votes	%	±%
Country	Jim Sparkes	6,140	71.5	+3.3
Labor	John Tomlinson	2,442	28.5	−3.3
Total formal votes		8,582	98.9	−0.3
Informal votes		92	1.1	+0.3
Turnout		8,674	92.4	+3.8
Country hold		Swing	+3.3	

1944 Queensland state election: Aubigny
Party	Candidate	Votes	%	±%
Country	Jim Sparkes	5,620	68.2	+4.9
Labor	William Harth	2,614	31.8	−4.9
Total formal votes		8,234	99.2	−0.2
Informal votes		67	0.8	+0.2
Turnout		8,301	88.6	−4.4
Country hold		Swing	+4.9	

1941 Queensland state election: Aubigny
Party	Candidate	Votes	%	±%
Country	Jim Sparkes	5,451	63.3	−2.4
Labor	Adolphus Baker	3,163	36.7	+12.7
Total formal votes		8,614	99.4	+0.5
Informal votes		50	0.6	−0.5
Turnout		8,664	93.0	+0.4
Country hold		Swing	−9.9	

=== Elections in the 1930s ===
1938 Queensland state election: Aubigny
Party	Candidate	Votes	%	±%
Country	Arthur Moore	5,408	65.7	−34.3
Labor	James Strofeld	1,976	24.0	+24.0
Independent	Hermann Wrembeck	844	10.3	+10.3
Total formal votes		8,228	98.9	
Informal votes		91	1.1	
Turnout		8,319	92.6	
Country hold		Swing	N/A	

- Preferences were not distributed.

1935 Queensland state election: Aubigny
Party	Candidate	Votes	%	±%
CPNP	Arthur Moore	unopposed		
CPNP hold		Swing		

1932 Queensland state election: Aubigny
Party	Candidate	Votes	%	±%
CPNP	Arthur Moore	4,806	66.7	
Labor	Benjamin Costin	2,394	33.3	
Total formal votes		7,200	99.3	
Informal votes		49	0.7	
Turnout		7,249	96.4	
CPNP hold		Swing		

=== Elections in the 1920s ===
1929 Queensland state election: Aubigny
Party	Candidate	Votes	%	±%
CPNP	Arthur Moore	3,914	65.1	−4.4
Independent	Edward Gore	2,099	34.9	+34.9
Total formal votes		6,013	98.8	−0.4
Informal votes		75	1.2	+0.4
Turnout		6,088	94.8	+2.1
CPNP hold		Swing	N/A	

1926 Queensland state election: Aubigny
Party	Candidate	Votes	%	±%
CPNP	Arthur Moore	3,877	69.5	+10.4
Labor	John Moir	1,700	30.5	−10.4
Total formal votes		5,577	99.2	+0.1
Informal votes		47	0.8	−0.1
Turnout		5,624	92.7	+5.0
CPNP hold		Swing	+10.4	

1923 Queensland state election: Aubigny
Party	Candidate	Votes	%	±%
Country	Arthur Edward Moore	3,318	59.1	−3.1
Labor	Charles Gould	2,294	40.9	+3.1
Total formal votes		5,612	99.1	−0.4
Informal votes		51	0.9	+0.4
Turnout		5,663	87.7	+0.7
Country hold		Swing	−3.1	

1920 Queensland state election: Aubigny
Party	Candidate	Votes	%	±%
Country	Arthur Moore	2,527	62.2	+62.2
Labor	William Brady	1,535	37.8	−10.5
Total formal votes		4,062	99.5	+0.2
Informal votes		20	0.5	−0.2
Turnout		4,082	87.0	+1.8
Country gain from National		Swing	N/A	

=== Elections in the 1910s ===
1918 Queensland state election: Aubigny
Party	Candidate	Votes	%	±%
National	Arthur Edward Moore	2,096	51.7	+24.3
Labor	James Desmond	1,958	48.3	+20.1
Total formal votes		4,054	99.3	+2.8
Informal votes		26	0.7	−2.8
Turnout		4,080	85.2	−3.1
National gain from Farmers' Union		Swing	N/A	

1915 Queensland state election: Aubigny
Party	Candidate	Votes	%	±%
Farmers' Union	Arthur Edward Moore	1,453	40.3	+40.3
Labor	Jack Jones	1,016	28.2	−2.6
Liberal	Alfred Luke	990	27.4	−41.8
Independent	Francis Mitchell	149	4.1	+4.1
Total formal votes		3,608	96.5	−2.1
Informal votes		93	3.5	+2.1
Turnout		3,701	88.3	+16.4
Two-candidate-preferred result
Farmers' Union	Arthur Edward Moore	1,747	62.7	+62.7
Labor	Jack Jones	1,039	37.3	+6.5
Farmers' Union gain from Liberal		Swing	N/A	

1912 Queensland state election: Aubigny
Party	Candidate	Votes	%	±%
Liberal	Alfred Luke	2,287	69.2	
Labor	John Connelly	1,020	30.8	
Total formal votes		3,307	98.6	
Informal votes		48	1.4	
Turnout		3,355	71.9	
Liberal hold		Swing		
