= College View, Queensland =

College View
- Suburb
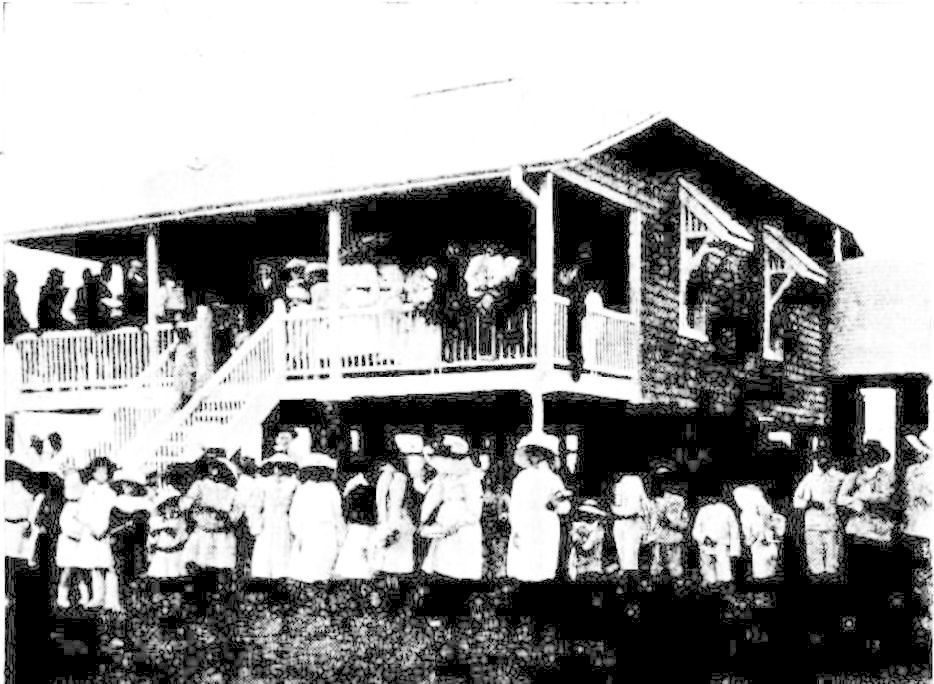
- Opening of the teacher's residence at College View State School, 1913

- Interactive map of College View
- Coordinates: 27.5541°S 152.3552°E
- Country: Australia
- State: Queensland
- LGA: Lockyer Valley Region
- Location: 8.1 km (5.0 mi) E of Gatton; 47.2 km (29.3 mi) E of Toowoomba; 48.8 km (30.3 mi) W of Ipswich; 102 km (63 mi) W of Brisbane

Government
  - State electorate: Lockyer
  - Federal division: Wright

Area
  - Total: 5.7 km^{2} (2.2 sq mi)

Population
  - Total: 72 (2021 census)
  - Density: 12.63/km^{2} (32.7/sq mi)
- Time zone: UTC+10:00 (AEST)
- Postcode: 4343
Suburbs around College View
Lawes	Lake Clarendon	Crowley Vale
Lawes	College View	Crowley Vale
Lawes	Forest Hill	Forest Hill

College View is a rural locality in the Lockyer Valley Region, Queensland, Australia. In the 2021 census, College View had a population of 72 people.

== Geography ==
The locality is bounded to the north by Lockyer Creek and to the south by Gatton Laidley Road West.

The Warrego Highway enters the locality from the north-east (Crowley Vale) and exits to the north-west (Lawes).

The land use is predominantly irrigated horticulture with some grazing on native vegetation.

== History ==
The locality takes its name from the former Queensland Agricultural College (now the University of Queensland Gatton Campus) in neighbouring Lawes.

On 28 August 1900, a public meeting was held to obtain a school in the district as there was an estimated 30 children who would attend. The Queensland Agricultural College offered 1 acre (0.40 ha) of its land (although this was subsequently increased as the Queensland Government thought more land was required for a school). College View Provisional School opened on 26 August 1901 with Miss Lewis as headteacher. On 1 January 1909, it became College View State School. A school residence was built in 1913. The school closed in 1958. It was at 5391 Warrego Highway, now within the locality of Lawes (approx 27.54456°S 152.34162°E).

== Demographics ==
In the 2016 census, College View had a population of 84 people.

In the 2021 census, College View had a population of 72 people.

== Education ==
There are no schools in College View. The nearest government primary schools are Lake Clarendon State School in neighbouring Lake Clarendon to the north and Forest Hill State School in neighbouring Forest Hill to the south. The nearest government secondary school is Lockyer District State High School in Gatton to the west.

== Facilities ==
Despite the name, Forest Hill Cemetery is on Logan Road in College View (27.5602°S 152.3458°E).
