= Henry John Daniels =

Australian politician

Henry Daniels
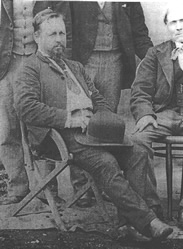

Member of the Queensland Legislative Assembly for Cambooya
- In office 6 May 1893 – 18 March 1899
- Preceded by: Patrick Perkins
- Succeeded by: Donald Mackintosh

Personal details
- Born: Henry John Daniels; 8 March 1850 Bethnal Green, London, England
- Died: 12 June 1934 (aged 84) Brisbane, Queensland, Australia
- Resting place: Toowong Cemetery
- Party: Labour Party
- Spouse(s): Susannah Patterson (m.1874 d.1901), Alice Chalmers
- Occupation: Selector

Henry John Daniels (8 March 1850 – 13 June 1934) was a selector and member of the Queensland Legislative Assembly.

== Early days ==
Daniels was born in Bethnal Green, London, to parents Samuel Daniels and his wife Charlotte (née Hood). and was educated in London before he arrived in Australia in 1861. After working in the tin mines at Stanthorpe from 1872 - 1874 he selected property at the Clifton Homestead Region, Mt Kent, Darling Downs in 1877. After selecting a large grazing farm at Gindie, in 1895 he transferred his leases in 1904 and moved to Brisbane, where he lived the rest of his life.

== Political career ==
Having been a member of the Queensland Shearers' Union, Daniels, for the Labour Party, represented the seat of Cambooya in the Queensland Legislative Assembly from 1893 until his defeat in 1899.

He was involved in a scandal in 1902 involving the construction and maintenance of a railway line from Normanton to Cloncurry. His involvement was never proven but it may have hurt his chances at re-election.

== Personal life ==
In 1874, Daniels married Susannah Patterson (died 1901) and together had three sons and three daughters. After Susannah's death, he married Alice Chalmers and had two more children.

He died on 12 June 1934 at Dunwich Benevolent Asylum and was buried in Toowong Cemetery.

Parliament of Queensland
Preceded by Patrick Perkins	Member for Cambooya; 1893–1899	Succeeded by Donald Mackintosh
