= Lawes, Queensland =

Lawes
- Suburb
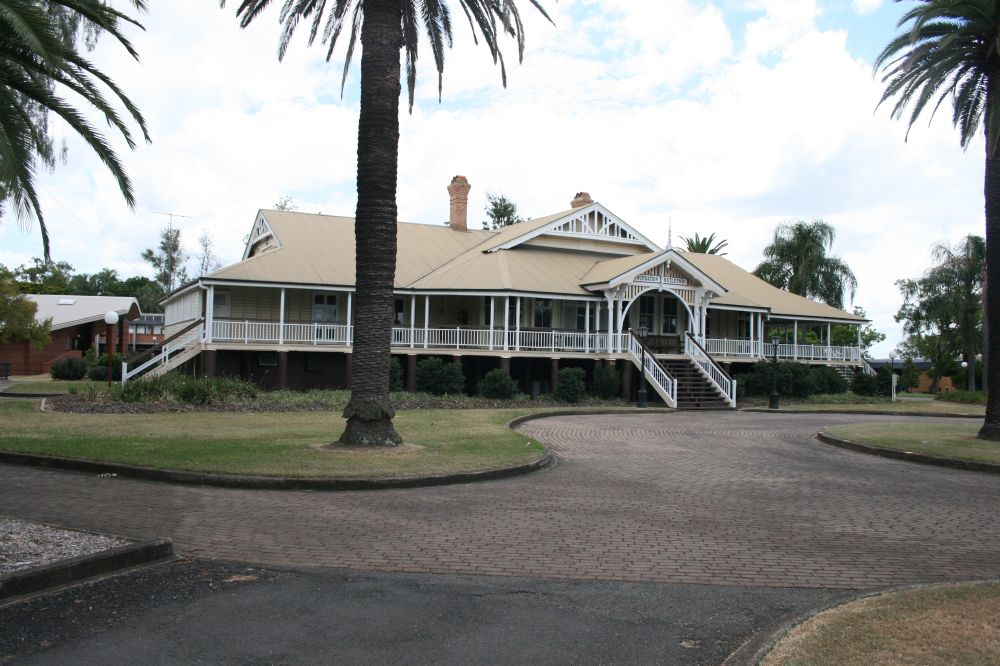
- Foundation Building of the Gatton Agricultural College, 2009

- Interactive map of Lawes
- Coordinates: 27°34′50″S 152°19′28″E
- Country: Australia
- State: Queensland
- LGA: Lockyer Valley Region
- Location: 7.2 km (4.5 mi) E of Gatton; 43.4 km (27.0 mi) E of Toowoomba; 82.9 km (51.5 mi) W of Brisbane

Government
  - State electorate: Lockyer
  - Federal division: Wright

Area
  - Total: 15.2 km^{2} (5.9 sq mi)

Population
  - Total: 105 (2021 census)
  - Density: 6.91/km^{2} (17.89/sq mi)
- Time zone: UTC+10:00 (AEST)
- Postcode: 4343
Suburbs around Lawes
Lake Clarendon	Lake Clarendon	Lake Clarendon
Gatton	Lawes	College View
Woodlands	Glen Cairn	Forest Hill

Lawes is a rural locality in the Lockyer Valley Region, Queensland, Australia. In the 2021 census, Lawes had a population of 105 people.

== Geography ==
Lawes is located on the eastern outskirts of the town of Gatton. The Warrego Highway enters the locality from the north-east (College View) and exists to west (Gatton) through the northern part of the locality. Further to the south, the Main Line railway enters the locality from the south-east (Forest Hill) and exits to the west (Gatton). Lawes railway station served the locality (27.5699°S 152.3271°E) but is now abandoned.

The University of Queensland Gatton Campus occupies most of the north of the locality, consisting of buildings and farms used for agricultural teaching and research purposes. There are two lakes on the campus, Lake Galletly (27.5541°S 152.3411°E) and Lake Lenor (27.5547°S 152.3394°E).

The south of the locality consists of privately owned farms used for crop growing and grazing on native vegetation.

== History ==
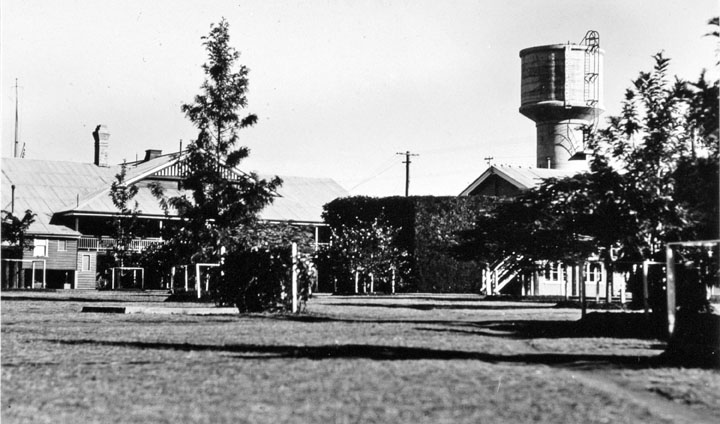
Queensland Agricultural High School and College, 1939

The University of Queensland Gatton Campus was established in 1897 as the Queensland Agricultural College. The college initially operated as a tertiary agricultural institution offering a basic practical and theoretical agricultural education for young men and short courses for farmers on specific topics, but from its inception, there was also an expectation that the college would be involved in agricultural research and experimentation. In 1922, it was re-structured as the Gatton Agricultural High School and College. From 1927, the College also took students from the University of Queensland for a year of practical experience. During the Second World War, the college was used as a field hospital by the United States Army from 1942 to 1944. After the war, it continued to operate as both a secondary and tertiary institution until the high school section was closed in 1962. In the 1960s the college began to diversify the courses on offer and the first women students enrolled in 1969. In 1990, the college merged with the University of Queensland.

On 28 August 1900, a public meeting was held to obtain a school in the district as there was an estimated 30 children who would attend. The Queensland Agricultural College offered 1 acre (0.40 ha) of its land (although this was subsequently increased as the Queensland Government thought more land was required for a school). College View Provisional School opened on 26 August 1901 with Miss Lewis as headteacher. On 1 January 1909, it became College View State School. A school residence was built in 1913. The school closed in 1958. It was at 5391 Warrego Highway (approx 27.54456°S 152.34162°E).

Lawes takes its name from the Lawes railway station, which in turn was named in 1936 (previously known as College Siding because of the adjacent Queensland Agricultural College). The Lawes name was proposed by the college principal, John K. Murray, in honour of Sir John Bennett Lawes, who was a scientist and founder of Rothamsted Experimental Station in Hertfordshire, England and promoted the use of artificial fertilizers and particularly superphosphate.

Lake Galletly and Lake Lenor were constructed in 1980 as a habitat for waterbirds by Dr Jim Galletly (a former student and staff member of the college). Lake Galletly was named after him and Lake Lenor was named after his wife.

In 2016, the University of Queensland opened the Gatton Solar Research Facility in 2016 on the former campus airstrip. Consisting of more than 37,000 thin-film photovoltaic panels installed over 10 hectares (25 acres), it supplies electricity to both the university campus and the Lockyer Valley area.

== Demographics ==
In the 2011 census, Lawes had a population of 304 people.

In the 2016 census, Lawes had a population of 328 people.

In the 2021 census, Lawes had a population of 105 people.

== Education ==
The heritage-listed University of Queensland Gatton Campus is located at Lawes. The Gatton Solar Research Facility is a solar farm on the campus (27.56039°S 152.33903°E).

There are no schools in Lawes. The nearest government primary schools are Forest Hill State School in Forest Hill to the south-east, Gatton State School in neighbouring Gatton to the west, and Lake Claredon State School in neighbouring Lake Claredon to the north-east. The nearest government secondary school is Lockyer District State High School in Gatton.
