= Electoral district of Cambooya =

Former state electoral district of Queensland, Australia

Cambooya Queensland—Legislative Assembly
- State: Queensland
- Created: 1888
- Abolished: 1912
- Namesake: Cambooya, Queensland
- Demographic: Rural
- Coordinates: 27°43′S 151°52′E

Cambooya was a Legislative Assembly electorate in the state of Queensland, Australia.

== History ==
Cambooya was created by the Electoral Districts Act of 1887, taking effect at the 1888 elections. It was based on the Western Downs area.

Cambooya was abolished at the 1912 elections, renamed the Electoral district of Pittsworth.

== Members ==
The following people were elected in the seat of Cambooya:

| Member | Party | Term detail |
|---|---|---|
| Patrick Perkins | none | 10 May 1888 – 6 May 1893 |
| Henry John Daniels | Labor | 6 May 1893 – 18 Mar 1899 |
| Donald Mackintosh | Ministerial | 18 Mar 1899 – 27 Apr 1912 |

== See also ==
- Electoral districts of Queensland
- Members of the Queensland Legislative Assembly by year
- Category:Members of the Queensland Legislative Assembly by name
