= University of Queensland Gatton Campus =

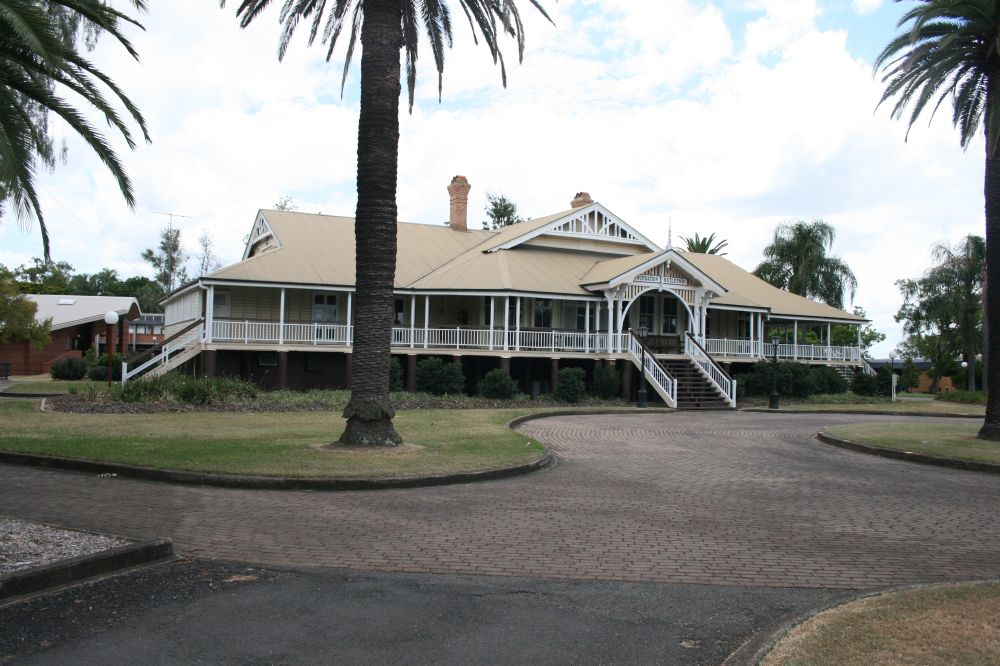
- Foundation building, 2009

- Location within Queensland Location within Australia
- 27.5521°S 152.3356°E
- Location: 5391 Warrego Highway, Lawes, Lockyer Valley Region, Queensland, Australia

History
- Design period: 1870s–1890s (late 19th century)
- Built: 1897–1960s

Site notes
- Owner: University of Queensland

Queensland Heritage Register
- Official name: University of Queensland Gatton Campus (Queensland University), Foundation Precinct Gatton College, Lawes Campus
- Type: state heritage (landscape, built, archaeological)
- Designated: 6 January 2004
- Reference no.: 601672
- Significant period: 1890s, 1920s, 1940s (historical); 1890s–1940s (fabric); 1890s–ongoing (social)
- Significant components: gymnasium, oval/sports field, sewage pump house/pumping station, residential accommodation – headmaster's house, shop – blacksmith's, shed – hay, residential accommodation – caretaker's quarters, dairy/creamery, shearing shed/woolshed, shed/s, office/administration building, hall – dining, tower – water, dormitory, laboratory, sewage farm/treatment site, shed – potato, school/school room, weighbridge/weigh station, trees/plantings, shed – wool classing, silo, swimming pool, science block

University of Queensland Gatton Campus is a heritage-listed university campus of the University of Queensland at Warrego Highway, Lawes (east of Gatton), Lockyer Valley Region, Queensland, Australia. It was built from 1897 to 1960s. It is also known as the Queensland Agricultural College, the Foundation Precinct Gatton College and Lawes Campus. It was added to the Queensland Heritage Register on 6 January 2004.

== History ==
The University of Queensland Gatton Campus was established in 1897 at Gatton as the Queensland Agricultural College. The College initially operated as a tertiary agricultural institution offering a basic practical and theoretical agricultural education for young men and short courses for farmers on specific topics, but from its inception, there was also an expectation that the College would be involved in agricultural research and experimentation. In 1922, it was re-structured as the Gatton Agricultural High School and College. From 1927, the College also took students from the University of Queensland for a year of practical experience. During the Second World War, the College was used as a field hospital by the United States Army from 1942 to 1944. After the war, it continued to operate as both a secondary and tertiary institution until the high school section was closed in 1962. In the 1960s the college began to diversify the courses on offer and the first women students enrolled in 1969. In 1990, the College merged with the University of Queensland.

The need to establish an agricultural college was first raised in Queensland Parliament in 1874 by Edward Wilmot Pechey, MLA for the Darling Downs. The development of scientific methods of agricultural production appropriate to Queensland was of both public and political concern and calls for a college and experimental farm continued to be made in the Parliament for the next two decades. Unlike the debate over the establishment of a university which divided those in favour of practical, applied education from those supporting humanist education for its own sake, agricultural education was widely supported in recognition of the essential role of primary production in the colony. It was also seen as a means to attract more people to settle and cultivate the land and it was proposed that several colleges were required to investigate agricultural methods for the various regions and climatic conditions in Queensland.

The Queensland Department of Agriculture was established in 1887 and teaching and research into agriculture was part of its early agenda. Following a request from the Queensland Government to the United States Government in 1889, Professor Edward Shelton of Kansas State Agricultural College was appointed as agricultural instructor for Queensland in 1890. After touring agricultural education institutions in other Australian colonies, Professor Shelton advocated the establishment of a local college in his first annual report.

The Australian-wide economic depression of the early 1890s frustrated attempts to utilise the £5000 allocated by the Queensland Parliament in 1891 to the founding of a college, and it was not until 1895 that the first 600 acres of land were purchased by Peter McLean, Under-Secretary of Agriculture. The land was part of the Rosewood Estate near Gatton, which the Government re-purchased under the provisions of the Agricultural Lands Purchase Act of 1894. A further 1092 acres were acquired in 1896 when the new Minister for Agriculture, Colonel Andrew Joseph Thynne, was determined to make the college a reality. The site was chosen both for its proximity by rail to Brisbane (and to the Queensland Department of Agriculture and Stock and its experts) and for its diversity of soil types. Three soil types were present on the site, providing scope for experimentation and wide cultivation experience for students. The Gatton site was also close to the greatest concentration of farmers in the colony. As the land was virgin forest, a contract was let in 1896 for the clearing and grubbing of 233 acres.

Sketch plans for the college were prepared by architect John Smith Murdoch of the Queensland Department of Public Works in 1896. The scheme comprised seven buildings linked by elevated covered walkways, in design reflecting Queensland's timber rural vernacular architecture. JS Murdoch was a talented designer, whose body of work includes such notable works as the Customs House, Maryborough, the Commonwealth Bank in Queen Street, Brisbane (now demolished), Commonwealth Government Offices at Anzac Square, Brisbane, Stanthorpe Post Office and the Old Parliament House in Canberra. The tender of £5079 by RW Roe was accepted in July 1896 and a Foundation Day ceremony, which attracted many notable public figures, was held on 22 August. Changes driven by budgetary considerations were made during construction, including the deletion of the network of covered walkways.

Professor Shelton was appointed as the first principal and the Queensland Agricultural College was officially opened by the Governor, Lord Lamington, on 9 July 1897. The College had an initial intake of twenty-three students and a staff of six men. The buildings were an administration and teaching block, two dormitories, a teacher's block, a dining room and kitchen, the Principal's residence and the Overseer's residence. The buildings were timber framed and clad, with cedar joinery and galvanised iron roofs. They were orientated to face south, in the direction of the Gatton-Forest Hill-Laidley Road and beyond this the Southern and Western Railway, where College Siding was established. The road to the siding was made all-weather proof in the early 1900s and served as the main entrance to the College until the mid-1920s, when the principal entrance was re-oriented to the north and the road from the Warrego Highway. In the first six months of operation a number of sheds, stables and a silo were constructed and machinery and livestock was purchased. Of the original buildings only the Foundation Building (the administrative and teaching block) and the Homestead (former Principal's residence) remain on the site.

The establishment and operation of Queensland Agricultural College was an important commitment by the Queensland Government to agricultural advancement. The development of the dairying industry was an early priority as was the introduction of new agricultural methods and technologies. For instance, in 1897, the first cutting of a crop with a "Scientific Harvester" to produce ensilage was watched by a 200 strong crowd of farmers from as far away as Nanango. As well as providing a basic practical and theoretical agricultural education for young men, the college also offered short courses for farmers on specific topics such as cheese making, milk testing, bee-keeping and sugar farming. The college also held short courses for teachers who were then able to offer basic agricultural education in schools across the state. The college continued to expand, with a gymnasium constructed in 1899 (now Sir Leslie Wilson Hall) and a third residential hall erected in 1908. The first two Canary Island date palms (Phoenix canariensis), now a signature feature of the campus, were planted outside the Foundation Building in 1915. Also planted in the 1910s, during the First World War, was a double row of Eucalyptus trees along College Siding Road.

For the first 25 years of its existence the Queensland Agricultural College was the responsibility of the Department of Agriculture and Stock, and functioned in isolation from the mainstream Queensland public education system. The gap between leaving school at 12 to 14 years and entering college at age 16 meant that there were no "feeder schools" to sustain the College, and the First World War (1914–1918) further reduced student and staff numbers. By the early 1920s, the College was threatened with closure, a 1921 report recommending that the property be sold as farms and the buildings removed and utilised elsewhere.

A special committee appointed by the Governor-in-Council advised that rather than closure, the Queensland Agricultural College be reconfigured as an Agricultural High School and College under the control of the Department of Public Instruction. This was the first major change to the structure and purpose of the college, and was made possible with the passing of the Agricultural Education Act 1922 and the establishment of a Board of Agricultural Education. Agricultural subjects were incorporated into the state secondary education curriculum and the Queensland Agricultural College was re-structured as the Gatton Agricultural High School and College. Boys were accepted from age 14 for high school training and encouraged to continue at Gatton at diploma level in their third and fourth years. At this time, 629 acres of college land was under cultivation including 5 acres for research, 38 for field trials and 20 acres of orchard. Site improvements by this time included a substantial hay shed erected in 1922.

The establishment of a Department of Agriculture at the University of Queensland at St Lucia in 1927 also affected the college at Gatton, as university students were required to complete a compulsory year of practical training at Gatton. Gatton College Principal, JK Murray, had been a representative on the Faculty of Science at the University since 1917, however, closer links were formed with the establishment of the new faculty. Murray, a trained agricultural scientist, was appointed as the University's first Professor of Agriculture whilst continuing as College principal. Murray strongly supported research, and collaboration between institutions continued with the establishment of a Council of Scientific and Industrial Research or CSIR (later the CSIRO) laboratory and field station at Gatton in 1930. (The CSIR was established in 1926 by the Commonwealth Government and in the 1930s established research laboratories throughout Australia to help develop Australian primary industry, including forest products, fisheries and food production.) In 1928 the College paddocks were renamed in honour of famous agricultural scientists.

In the 1920s the main Brisbane-Toowoomba Road through Shire of Tarampa (later Shire of Gatton) was upgraded as one of Queensland's first Main Roads, and the farm road leading from the Brisbane-Toowoomba Road (later the Warrego Highway) to the College was upgraded as the principal entrance to the Gatton Agricultural High School and College, thus re-orienting the main entrance to the north. The avenue of Canary Island date palms (Phoenix canariensis) which extends along each side of the original roadway from the Warrego Highway and through the heart of the campus to the Foundation Building was planted in 1927. A 1936 military map, compiled from earlier aerial photographs and a 1934 ground survey, indicates that an avenue of trees extended along the road opposite the main entrance to the College, north of the Brisbane-Toowoomba Road to Lockyer Creek and a popular swimming hole. At an early period a timber changing rooms was constructed beside the swimming hole.

A spate of building activity and infrastructure improvements barely kept pace with the growth of the College following its conversion to an agricultural high school and college.

Along with their farm neighbours, one of the principal difficulties experienced by the College since its establishment had been the provision of an adequate water supply during periods of drought. After lobbying by successive Principals, a low-level weir was constructed in 1928–29 on Lockyer Creek, along with two 30,000 gallon (136,000 litres) reinforced concrete tanks on the creek bank, and a pump to force water to another 30,000 gallon (136,000 litres) capacity reinforced concrete main supply tank, or water tower, located in the campus core. The water tower has become a College landmark, visible from the Main Range at Toowoomba, 50 kilometres (31 mi) to the west. A substantial overhaul was made in 1997.

Staff and students often worked together to build or improve college facilities during this period. Their work included formation of the Tom Graham Cricket Oval in 1931, and the 1930 relocation by students using horses and tractors, of a timber grandstand, erected in 1927 on a sports ground near the site of the present War Memorial Swimming Pool, to a more appropriate location overlooking the planned new oval. In the early 1930s the Gymnasium was lined with silky-oak and walnut milled and installed by students. In 1935 this building was extended in length, new dressing rooms were constructed either side of the re-erected stage, and the interior was lined to match the existing hall. Used variously as a gymnasium, theatre, cinema (a cinematograph projector was installed in 1927, and replaced by a Movietown Sound Projector in 1931), assembly hall, recreation hall, chapel, and currently as a lecture room, the building was re-located in 1978 to a site between the inner and outer ring roads on the western edge of the campus.

In 1935 College Siding was renamed Lawes Siding in honour of Sir John Bennett Lawes, who had endowed the world's first agricultural research station in England. Also in 1935 a flagpole, presented by the Bundaberg Branch of the "Old Boys" Association, was erected in front of the Foundation Building, between the two Canary Island date palms planted in 1915. After the central road through the campus was closed, the flagpole was re-located in 1985 to the southern end of what is now the central walkway.

Three more halls of residence were built in the 1930s. Thynne Hall was constructed in 1933 (sold for removal in 1973) and Morrison Hall, originally Shelton Hall, in 1936. Enrolments continued to grow, with 323 full-time students attending in 1938 when a third dormitory, Riddell Hall, was constructed. Residential facilities were stretched in the late 1930s when 106 unemployed young men took part in a year's training course conducted under the Unemployed Youths Training Scheme.

With the outbreak of the Second World War in 1939 student enrolments declined, but the war initially hardly affected the functioning of the College. In 1941 a shearing shed, with drafting yards and dip, and Crow's Silo, were erected. Also constructed in 1941was a new seed research unit, including offices, four laboratories and a glasshouse, barn and seed store, which were handed over to the CSIR. This facility was named the Cooper Laboratory.

The entry of the United States into the war in late 1941, however, brought a significant period of change to the College, with eighty-five acres of its land and the majority of its buildings being transferred in March 1942 to the United States Army for hospital purposes. The 153rd Station Hospital occupied the site briefly until July 1942, when replaced by the 105th General Hospital Unit. Only twenty-four students and a drastically reduced staff remained on campus. The College administration moved to the newly completed Cooper Laboratory and Riddell Dormitory was retained until September 1942 by which time temporary buildings had been constructed for the College by the Department of Public Works, in the northeast corner of the campus. The College also occupied the nearby College View State School as a laboratory from March 1942 to April 1943. In January 1943 more temporary buildings were erected for the College, which re-opened for enrolments in February 1943. College wartime work included the testing of alternative fuels and growing crops of opium poppy, urgently needed during war for the production of morphine. Extensive temporary facilities were erected by the Civil Construction Corps for the military hospital, including nearly two dozen large timber hospital wards, interconnected by covered walkways, on the eastern side of the campus core. A large "tent city" was established to the south of the core, serving as living quarters for soldiers undergoing rehabilitation. Existing buildings were altered to serve a variety of wartime purposes. The Foundation Building was used as both the administrative headquarters for the US Army and as a laboratory and pharmacy, its verandahs enclosed to provide more space. Shelton Hall (now Morrison Hall) was used as the hospital, its dormitories well suited for use as hospital wards, with dental services, X-Ray facilities and operating theatres located on the ground floor. In 1943 a U-shaped morgue was constructed, used for the examination and preparation of deceased soldiers for transportation back to their families in the United States. In 1944 the two most northerly wings of the building were removed prior to the Americans leaving the College, and from 1945 the remaining section was utilised as a residence and later a girls' change room before being converted into a small chapel in 1959. 19,000 patients from the battlefields of the Pacific and New Guinea were treated at Gatton during the period of occupation by the US Army.

A number of more permanent facilities were also constructed during the period of military occupation, including a Sewerage Treatment Works and a Pump House on the northern side of the Warrego Highway. These are still in use.

In 1944–45 the College repossessed the site for educational purposes. Many of the buildings needed to be re-adapted for college requirements, and this was paid for by the Commonwealth Government. Twenty buildings erected on campus during the war were acquired form the Commonwealth Disposals Commission including 8 former military hospital wards, which remained in use as dormitories to accommodate a postwar influx of students and staff. These dormitories, commonly known as the "warrens", were destroyed by fire in August 1963. The morgue and the remnants of a rubbish dump established by the US Army about 50 metres (160 ft) southeast of the present piggery are the only surviving features associated with the American occupation of the campus. A cairn and plaque commemorating the use of the College by the United States Army 105th General Base Hospital between 1942 and 1944 was erected opposite the main dining hall and unveiled in 1968.

The late 1940s and 1950s was a period of recovery and consolidation for the College. Few new buildings were erected, but student enrolments increased significantly and College land holdings expanded with the purchase of a small farm in the Laidley area in 1945, an adjacent farm of 95 acres in 1948 and an additional 85 acres to the west, fronting the Brisbane-Toowoomba highway, in 1950. Teaching innovations introduced during this period included training of returned servicemen, Summer Agricultural Schools for primary school boys, Rotary-sponsored short farming courses for migrants and a course in butchering for indigenous students.

In 1951, the former Crowley Vale State School, erected c. 1916 to a standard Queensland Works Department "open-air" school plan, was moved onto the college grounds as a lunchroom for farm hands. In 1995, it was re-located to its present position west of Services Road (27.54925°S 152.33957°E).

In honour of students and staff from the College who had fought in the two world wars, an Olympic-sized War Memorial Swimming Pool was constructed in the early 1950s. Site excavation was carried out in 1950–52, largely by student labour using farm machinery such as tractors and ploughs, but the post-war shortage of materials delayed construction until 1953–54. The pool was funded by a War Memorial Fund established by College staff and students. In 1958–59 dressing rooms and a spectator pavilion were constructed beside the pool, partly funded by Queensland Government subsidy.

In 1959 the main entrance from the Warrego Highway was improved with the construction of curved brick fences with ornamental steel work flanking the entrance, and a steel sign replacing the old wooden sign. The Hugh Courtney Oval was established in 1959–60, 1000 tons of ashes from the Bulimba Powerhouse were spread for drainage and the grass was cultivated by Gatton students.

A dam was constructed to the east of the Foundation Precinct in the 1950s. In 1980, during a particularly dry season, it was re-designed as a wildlife sanctuary and named Lake Galletly after past student, long-serving staff member and nature conservationist, Jim Galletly.

In contrast to the restricted building program of the 1950s, the 1960s and 1970s was a boom construction period for the college, reflecting in part the dominance of the Country/National Party in Queensland politics. The Queensland Government made a commitment to upgrade facilities at the College and to replace the early timber buildings and Second World War timber and fibrous cement structures, with more substantial brick buildings. In 1962 the high school section was closed and the college reverted to a tertiary institution with around 900 students enrolled. Thirty overseas students enrolled in 1960 under the Colombo Plan. In 1966 a wide diversification of courses was initiated under the guidance of the newly formed Queensland Agricultural Education Advisory Board, including rural-related subjects such as food technology, hospitality, tourism, real estate valuation and wildlife services. The College gained autonomy from the Department of Education in 1967 and commenced a major building program. Brisbane firm Bligh Jessup Brentnall was retained as architects and developed a site plan for the college, heralding the "red brick" era of its development. Construction included halls of residence, lecture theatres and schools, a new administration block, and new animal facilities. A new gymnasium was erected in 1968, funded by the College Welfare Fund and Queensland Government subsidy, and was dedicated in 1969 as the War Memorial Gymnasium.

An airstrip was established in 1966 as a training ground for students interested in obtaining a private pilot's licence and has developed as a facility for the Air Training Corps and Army Cadets on campus, as well as for sports such as gliding, hot air ballooning and parachuting. In 1973 it was officially named the CH Francis Airstrip in honour of long-serving staff member Charles Francis who was instrumental its development.

In 1971 Gatton became a College of Advanced Education and control passed to a College Council. The then Director, Neil Briton, quoted Prime Minister John Gorton in declaring the aim of the College to be to produce a new end-product - a liberally-educated technologist. The first women students enrolled in 1969 on a non-residential basis, and residential women students were accepted in 1971. The College began to confer its own degrees in 1973 and continued to diversify the courses on offer. The next major change came with the Commonwealth government's education policy changes in 1988, which required tertiary institutions to have a minimum student population of 2000 full-time enrolments. Gatton did not meet the size criteria and like many other smaller colleges, consolidated with a larger institution. On 1 January 1990, it became part of the University of Queensland and is now known as The University of Queensland, Gatton Campus. There are currently around 1000 students enrolled.

== Description ==
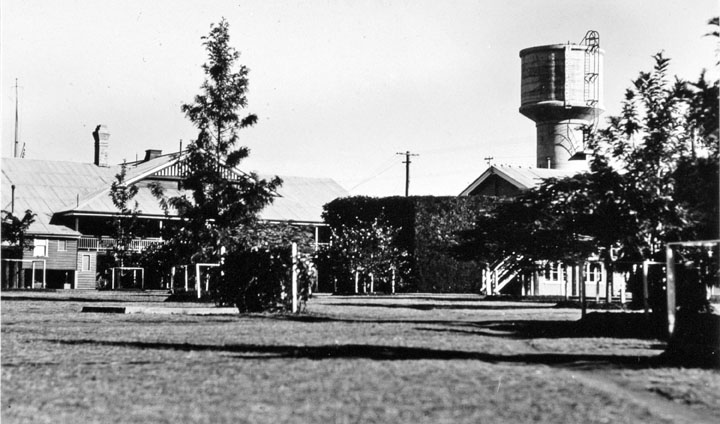
Queensland Agricultural High School and College, 1939

The University of Queensland Gatton Campus is located on the Warrego Highway, just east of the town of Gatton. It comprises two distinct areas: the main campus at Lawes, approximately 6 kilometres (3.7 mi) east of Gatton, and the Darbalara Farms, located approximately 5 kilometres (3.1 mi) to the south east of the main campus. The focus of interest for the entry in the Queensland Heritage Register is the main campus at Lawes; the Darbalara Farms are not included in the heritage listing.

The principal built portion of the main campus sits on an elevated sandstone ridge accessed via a ring road from the Warrego Highway; the remainder of the site is divided into paddocks with frontages to Laidley Creek to the east and Lockyer Creek to the north. The site has features of both a university campus and a working farm, with a mixture of teaching buildings, administration and research centres, residential halls and staff houses, recreational facilities, laboratories, buildings and structures associated with the working farms, and infrastructure such as the water tower and an early sewerage treatment plant. The earliest elements date from the establishment of the Queensland Agricultural College in 1897.

For the purposes of the entry in the Queensland Heritage Register, a number of key buildings, structures, plantings, spaces and landscape features of cultural heritage significance within the Gatton Campus have been identified. However, a more thorough cultural heritage survey of the whole of the campus may reveal other elements of significant cultural heritage.

The buildings, structures, plantings, spaces and landscape features of cultural heritage significance within the Gatton Campus which have been identified to date are scattered across the site. For the purposes of this entry in the Queensland Heritage Register and for consistency with University site planning, these have been grouped within the areas and precincts identified in the Gatton Campus Site Development Plan 2003. Numbering of the buildings corresponds to the University campus map (see External Links).

=== Site layout ===
For site planning purposes, the University has divided the main campus at Lawes into four areas, some of which have been further divided into precincts:

1. The Core, located on the sandstone ridge above the Lockyer Creek floodplain, contains the academic, social, and cultural heart of Gatton Campus. This area includes the Main Entry precinct, Central Precinct and the historic Foundation Precinct.
2. The Core Environs, a large area on the fringe of the Core where teaching, demonstration and research is conducted in a farm environment, includes the historic Farm Square Precinct and the CSIRO Cooper Laboratories.
3. The Residential Area, consisting of student accommodation in halls of residence, single dwellings for staff and students, and recreational facilities, is also identified as the Sport and Residential Precinct.
4. The Farms, broad acre fields with some outlying teaching, research, recreational and infrastructure facilities, surround the Core Environs and Residential Area.

The above divisions reflect more than a planning pragmatism; they are important historically in illustrating the arrangement of administrative, teaching, training, farming, research, residential and recreational spaces within what has served for over a century as Queensland's most significant rural educational institution. Despite a massive building program from the 1960s onwards, and the re-orientation of the principal access road from the Lawes Railway Siding to the Warrego Highway, the Gatton Campus continues to demonstrate the principal site relationships established in the late 19th and early 20th centuries: a core teaching/administrative/residential centre located on the sandstone ridge; farm training, workshop and service areas to the north of this; recreational facilities to the south; and the whole surrounded by farm paddocks.

=== Central Precinct ===
This precinct encompasses the bulk of the academic teaching facilities, most of which have been constructed since the 1960s, and is centred around the walkway linking the northern and southern ends of the Core area. This walkway is of significance as evidence of the former central access road through the site, and is marked by an avenue of Canary Island date palms (Phoenix canariensis) planted in 1927. Also located in this precinct is a 1968 cairn and plaque commemorating the use of the College as an American army hospital during the Second World War.

=== Foundation Precinct ===
The Foundation Precinct, at the southern end of the Core area, contains elements of high cultural heritage value, including: the Foundation Building (1897) (Bldg 8118), The Homestead (1897) (Bldg 8124), the Water Tower (1928–29) (Bldg 8149), Morrison Hall (1936) (Bldg 8123), and paved and landscaped areas including plantings of Canary Island date palms (1915), a memorial flagpole (1935), and a recent sandstone war memorial. To the southwest of Morrison Hall is a Chapel (1943) (Bldg 8127), and to the west of the main Foundation Precinct is the former Gymnasium, now known as Sir Leslie Wilson Hall (1899) (Bldg 8129), which has been moved to this site from the ridge above. Sited just west of the Sir Leslie Wilson Hall are two small timber buildings (Bldgs 8128, 8130) which also have been moved to this location.

The Foundation Building (1897) (Bldg 8118) is a large timber building, purpose-designed as an administration and teaching facility, in the lightweight timber vernacular of the Federation era. It is single storey and high-set on substantial timber stumps which have been roughly finished by hand. The building has expansive verandahs (12 feet (3.7 m)) on the southern and eastern sides with those on the west and north remaining enclosed with timber chamferboards, timber casement windows and aluminium-framed windows respectively. The building has prominent gabled and vented hip roofs clad in corrugated, Colorbond steel and has two brick chimneys. There are four external timber stairways with dowel balusters and timber handrails. A projecting entrance porch and entry stair are centrally located on the southern elevation of the building, aligned with what was formerly the southern (main) approach to the Agricultural College from Lawes Railway Siding. The porch is decorated with a timber arch and other ornate timber detailing. The external walls are horizontal pine chamferboards and the verandah roofs are lined with tongue-in-groove beaded boards.

The building has been partially restored. It has a central hallway. The front entrance hall and reception rooms on either side have been newly painted and have linoleum floors. Each of these rooms has a fireplace with timber mantel, and bay windows to the verandah. All internal walls are lined with tongue-in-groove beaded boards with timber joinery including ceiling vent panels and fanlights. A large reception room is located on the eastern side of the building. It has carpeted floors and groups of folding timber doors with multi-paned glass to the verandah. The north and western portions of the building remain un-restored and are currently occupied by a small kitchen area, a dining room, toilets and various unused rooms. Original fabric is evident throughout.

The sub-floor has been partially enclosed with a variety of building materials including chamferboards, fibrous-cement sheeting and timber casement windows. A large cleaners' room is located on the southern side with an entry door and several windows in the southern wall. A staff recreation club is located on the western and northern side with an adjacent paved area enclosed with timber screens and pergola roof.

The Homestead (1897) (Bldg 8124) is a low-set timber building, also Federation style, constructed as a residence for the principal of the college. It is single storey, high-set on timber stumps, and has wide verandahs with dowel balusters on the southern, eastern and western sides of the building, and a service wing to the north. The verandah to the west has been semi-enclosed with fixed vertical timber shutters. Some of the external walls are painted, horizontal pine chamferboards, whilst others are single-skin with exposed bracing and studs. The building has a multi-gabled, hipped roof, three brick chimneys and a decorative finial. Wide timber entry stairs, surmounted by a decorative gable roof, mark the entry to the building. It has substantial timber front and rear doors linked by a central hallway. A large reception room on the western side of the hall is divided by a decorative timber arch and has a skylight and a brick fireplace. The interior is lined in pine tongue-in-groove boards, the floors are carpeted and a number of the rooms are air-conditioned by window-mounted units. Multi-paned timber sliding sash windows and timber French doors are found throughout the building.

Morrison Hall (1936) (Bldg 8123) is a substantial, two-level timber, brick and stucco building located to the south of the Foundation Building. Paving and a formal arrangement of Canary Island date palms create a strong visual link between the two buildings. The front of the building is landscaped with raised lawn areas, low masonry retaining walls and mature Poinciana trees. The front (north) elevation of the building is dominated by a central projecting gable roof with decorative infill to the gable end, an impressive timber entry stair and substantial stucco pillars. Morrison Hall is a U-shaped building in plan. Each wing has a strip of central rooms (originally dormitories) with long verandahs to both sides. The front part of the building has a large central room, flanked by expansive internal verandah spaces to either side. This central room has a large arched brick fireplace and a series of French Doors onto the verandah spaces. All rooms on the first floor have timber floors and single-skin, timber walls. The ceilings of the verandahs are lined with horizontal, tongue-in-groove boards. The first floor has multi-paned timber casement and sliding sash windows, French doors and single leaf timber doors throughout. Offices and meeting rooms occupy the first floor.

The ground floor has concrete and tiled floors. External walls are generally rendered brick with some concrete columns and multi-paned, timber in-fill doors and windows. Most of the ground floor is occupied by the Student Union with facilities including a cafeteria area, recreation room and some meeting rooms and offices which are enclosed with aluminium framed, glass partitions. The eastern wing of the ground floor is occupied by the bookshop which is also enclosed with aluminium framed, glass partitions. A large grassed courtyard area is located at the rear of the building.

Sir Leslie Wilson Hall (1899 with 1935 extension) (Bldg 8129) is a large timber weatherboard building with a hipped, steel-trussed roof and a number of small, lean-to annexes. It has timber sash windows and is raised on concrete stumps. It is lined internally with fibrous-cement sheeting. The building was re-located in 1978 to a site between the inner and outer ring roads, a little to the northwest of the Core area's Foundation Precinct.

The two small buildings to the west of Sir Leslie Wilson Hall (Bldgs 8128, 8130) are both timber framed, weatherboard clad, and high-set on concrete stumps. They are aligned in a north-south direction. The building to the north has a hipped roof; the building to the south a gable roofed. Both roofs are clad in corrugated steel sheeting. The building to the south has early double-hung sash windows, each sash being divided vertically into two panes. The northern building has later aluminium framed windows.

To the southwest of Morrison Hall and situated beneath a tall Bunya Pine, is the Chapel (1943/1959) (Bldg 8127). It is a small, timber-framed building with a corrugated steel sheeted gable roof, and is the remaining portion of a building erected as a morgue for the United States Army in 1943, and converted into a chapel in 1959. Externally the walls have weatherboards to sill height, with fibrous-cement sheeting above, and timber casement windows. Internally it has a concrete floor which is carpeted, and the walls are lined with fibrous cement sheeting.

The Water Tower (1928–29) (Bldg 8149) is located to the west of the Foundation Building. It has a hollow cylindrical concrete base with internal access ladders, supporting a 136,000 litre capacity main water supply tank, also concrete and cylindrical but of wider diameter than the base. The whole is approximately 20 metres (66 ft) in height, and being located on the highest ground on the campus amidst low-scale buildings, is a landmark, visible from the Warrego Highway approaches and from the Main Range at Toowoomba, 50 kilometres (31 mi) distant.

=== Farm Square Precinct (including Agricultural Place) ===
The Farm Square Precinct is situated to the northeast of the central precinct, within the Core Environs area. Elements of cultural heritage significance within this precinct include: Farm Square (begun 1899) (Bldg 8216), Crow's Silo (1941) (Bldg 8217), the Weighbridge (Bldg 8215), the Merv Young Field Facilities Building (former Woolshed, 1913–15) (Bldg 8134), former Dairy Factory (now a Printery) (1912) (Bldg 8131), the Hayshed (1923) (Bldg 8213), a Blacksmith's Shed (1933) (Bldg 8208), a c. 1900 residence (Bldg 8258); Shearing Shed (1941) (Bldg 8230), Wool Classing Shed (c. 1940s) (Bldg 8231), and 6 other c. 1940s buildings associated with the move of the College teaching and farm facilities to the northeast of the campus during the Second World War (Bldgs 8260, 8233–8237). Of contributory significance is the former Crowley Vale School (1916) (Bldg 8158), which has been moved to a location on Services Road. Farm Square Precinct also contains a number of mature trees which contribute significantly to the aesthetic value of the campus, including a row of tall Bangalow Palms at the southern end of Services Road.

Farm Square (1899-) (Bldg 8216) is a collection of structures containing stables, stalls, lofts and storage areas arranged around a large internal space - the square. The square has a bitumen floor and contains a horse-breaking ring and washing area. The buildings on the southern, eastern and western sides of the square contain stables, stalls, harness shed, and tool room. They are timber framed and clad in weatherboards with broad gabled roofs clad in corrugated, colorbond steel. The walls facing the square are generally half-height with a regular pattern of timber stable doors. The building on the northern side of Farm Square (1986) is constructed of concrete block and contains classrooms and office facilities. Vehicle access is provided via a gap between the buildings at the north-east corner. A second driveway is located at southern end, adjacent to a concrete silo known as Crow's Silo (1941) (Bldg 8217). The silo is the oldest remaining silo on the campus and has a gabled steel roof.

The Hayshed (1923) (Bldg 8213) is located to the north of Farm Square. It is a substantial timber weatherboard building built in the style of an American barn with a mansard roof which allows for the more efficient use of the upper roof space.

The Weighbridge (c. 1940s) (Bldg 8215) is located west of Farm Square. It consists of a cast iron weighbridge set into the road and an adjacent small, timber-framed shed clad externally in fibrous cement sheeting.

The Merv Young Field Facilities Building (former Woolshed) (1913–15) (Bldg 8134) is located across Farm Lane, to the southwest of Farm Square. It has an unorthodox two-storey design that accommodated sheep-shearing downstairs and pressing and classing wool upstairs. It is a tall timber building clad in weatherboards with a gabled corrugated steel roof. It has been renovated with a steel inner staircase and steel balcony located on the upper level. It now contains offices.

The Printery (former Dairy Factory) (1912 with extensions in 1932 & 1934) (Bldg 8131) is located on the corner of Printery Lane and Nursery Lane. It comprises a collection of timber buildings with corrugated steel gabled roofs. From the 1980s it has been occupied by the campus printery. Internal walls have been re-located and new ceiling and wall linings and internal toilets added.

The Blacksmith's Shed (1933) (Bldg 8208) is located to the east of Farm Square in the Maintenance and Services section. It is a timber weatherboard shed with a hipped roof clad in corrugated steel. It is now sandwiched between recent large steel sheds.

An Early Residence (c. 1900) (Bldg 8258) is located along Services Road in the northeast sector of the Farm Square precinct, near the Shearing Shed and Wool Classing Shed. It is timber-framed and clad, and is high-set on concrete stumps. It has a half-gabled bungalow-style roof, with the roof of the core extending down over verandahs on the front and rear elevations and wrapping around the sides. The gable ends have weatherboard in-fill beneath wide eaves, decorative timber slats in front of the weatherboards, and tapered and shaped timber bargeboards. The verandahs are enclosed with weatherboards to sill height and a mix of multi-paned timber casement windows (on the western side and part of the front (north) elevation) and later metal-framed windows. There is an early, one-roomed wing with a hipped roof, on the eastern side of the rear (south) elevation. There is also a later (c. 1940s) gable-roofed extension attached to the western side of the rear elevation. This is clad externally in chamferboards and has a corrugated metal roof. The house sits within an open, grassed and fenced yard. A number of mature trees just outside the front and eastern fences contribute significantly to its aesthetic setting.

The Shearing Shed (1941) (Bldg 8230) is located on the northeastern edge of the Farm Square Precinct. It contains a shearing shed, a lecture room for up to 60 students, wool room, a scour room, experting room and office. It is a large, low-set timber building with a broad gabled roof. It is clad with weatherboards, has timber sash windows and a corrugated steel roof.

The Wool Classing Shed (c. 1940s) (Bldg 8231) is also located on the northeastern edge of the Farm Square Precinct, just south of the Shearing Shed, facing north/northwest. It is a large, low-set timber-framed building of three bays, with a complex roof clad in corrugated iron: hipped along each side bay, with a central high saw-tooth roof structure above the central bay. Externally the building is clad with weatherboards to sill height, with fibrous cement sheeting and timber cover strips above.

A Temporary Dining Hall and Kitchen (1942) (Bldg 8260), now staff quarters, is situated on Services Road almost opposite the Shearing Shed. It is a small, rectangular, hipped-roof building, timber-framed, and clad externally with weatherboards to sill height, with fibrous cement sheeting and timber cover strips above. The roof is clad with corrugated metal sheeting. Verandahs on the north and south elevations have separate roofs to the core and are enclosed with fibrous cement sheeting to sill height and glass louvres above.

Buildings 8233–8237 (c. 1940s) are located near the Poultry Unit area in the eastern sector of the Farm Square Precinct. The five buildings are all timber-framed and set on low stumps, with roofs clad in corrugated metal sheeting. Building 8234 is the largest of the five. Rectangular in form, it has a hipped roof and is clad externally with weatherboards. On the north elevation the roof extends bungalow-fashion over an open verandah. Adjacent to the south elevation of this building are two small hip-roofed ancillary buildings (Bldgs 8235, 8236). Building 8235 appears to be an ablutions block, and is set low on the ground. Building 8236 is set on stumps and is clad in weatherboards. The second largest building in ithis group is Building 8233, which is sited just west of Building 8234. It is rectangular in form with a hipped roof, and is clad mostly with weatherboards, with fibrous cement sheeting at the southern end. It has an open verandah along the west elevation. The fifth structure (Building 8237) is located to the northwest of Building 8234, across a gravel road. It is a smaller building, square in form, set low on the ground and clad in fibrous-cement sheeting. It has a hipped roof which extends down over an enclosed verandah on the north elevation. A brick chimney rises above the roof on the western side.

The former Crowley Vale School (1916) (Bldg 8158) is a re-located building currently situated at the far northern end of the Farm Square Precinct, to the west of Services Road. It is a small, timber-framed building, square in form, which rests on low stumps. It has a hipped roof with a short ridge roof clad with corrugated steel sheeting, and has wide, overhanging eaves. It is a standard Queensland Works Department design, a modification of the earlier open-air school concept. Externally the building is clad with fibrous-cement sheeting to half wall height, with banks of windows above.

=== CSIRO Cooper Laboratory ===
The CSIRO Cooper Laboratory (1941) is located to the north of the Central Precinct, within the Core Environs and east of Main Drive. It comprises a complex of structures: four laboratories, eight offices, seed barns, sterile seed store, seed storage rooms and a glasshouse. The collection of low-set buildings are predominantly constructed of orange-red brick with one or two timber sheds. All have hipped roofs with wide eaves, and are clad in corrugated steel.

=== Sport and Residential Precinct ===
This precinct is located to the south of the Foundation Precinct, within the Core Environs area. Of cultural heritage significance within this precinct are three sporting ovals constructed largely by staff and students, a grandstand (1927), the War Memorial Swimming Pool complex (1950s) and the War Memorial Gymnasium (1968). The Tom Graham Cricket Oval (1931) is located in the eastern third of this precinct. The Grandstand (Bldg 8336) is located on the western edge of the Tom Graham Cricket Oval. It is a small timber framed and weatherboard structure with tiered timber bench seating and a corrugated steel, timber-framed roof with a small projecting, decorative gable roof over the access staircase. The Hugh Courtney Rugby Oval (1959–60) is located in the western third of the precinct, and the Ray McNamara Sports Oval (1965) is situated in the centre. Northwest of the ovals are the swimming pool and gymnasium. The War Memorial Swimming Pool Complex (Bldg 8145) comprises an Olympic-size swimming pool, spectator stand, and dressing rooms.

To the south and west of the main sporting facilities are a number of pre-1950 staff houses along South Ridge Road. Of particular interest are nos.8 & 15, which are likely c. 1920s.

At the northeastern end of the Sport and Residential Precinct is a small reserve on a separate lot on plan, occupied by Australian Defence Force Reservists.

=== Farms Area ===
There are a number of elements of cultural heritage significance located within the Farms Area. These are important in illustrating the evolution of the development of Gatton Campus.

Elements identified to the south of the core area include: Lawes Siding Road (1897), the original principal access road to the Agricultural College, at the southern end of the campus. This road leads in a straight line in a northeasterly direction from the Lawes Railway Siding on the Southern and Western Railway, across the Gatton-Forest Hill/Laidley Road, to the Core Area of Gatton Campus. It is lined by an avenue of Eucalypts (planted in the 1910s) and other mature trees such as palm trees.

- Avenue of Trees (bean?), located south of the core area to the west of Lawes Siding Road, just north of, and at right angles to, the present Gatton-Forest Hill/Laidley Road. Between the trees is remnant asphalted roadway associated with the earlier alignment of the Gatton-Forest Hill/Laidley Road. Between the avenue and the present Gatton-Forest Hill/Laidley Road is a grove of less mature trees of the same species.
- The CH Francis Airstrip (1966), located to the south of the Sport and Recreational Precinct, east of Lawes Siding Road. The strip is aligned in an east-west direction, and has a grassed surface.

Elements identified to the east of the core area include:

- Lake Galletly (1950s), an ornamental lake and wildlife refuge located to the east of the Core Environs.

Elements identified to the immediate north of the core area include:

- The original Warrego Highway entrance road to the Agricultural College, leading in a straight line south/southeast from the highway to the northern end of the Core, and marked by an avenue of mature trees, including Leopard Trees (Caesalpinia ferrea), Poinciana (Delonix regia), Leptospermum spp. and Eucalyptus spp.

Elements identified to the north of the Warrego Highway include:

- The Former College View State School and adjacent Residence (Bldgs 8411, 8412 & 8413), situated to the north of the Warrego Highway, east of the overpass. The school building is of contributory significance, having been moved to this site from the Tarampa Road. It is a small, timber framed, weatherboard clad building on low stumps, with a gable roof clad in corrugated metal sheeting. The residence is a high-set timber "Queenslander" c. 1910s which is also understood to have been moved to this location.
- A Barn (Bldg 8431), located just east of the overpass road on the north side of Warrego Highway. The barn is a rectangular, timber-framed structure with a high gabled roof clad in corrugated iron, the whole high-set on timber stumps. There are double timber swing doors at each end of the building, the doors at the eastern end opening onto a small timber-framed loading dock
- The Sewerage Treatment Works (c. 1942) (Bldgs 8422–8426 & 8428–8429 & 8428), located along the ring road which follows Lockyer Creek around the northern farms. This complex remains remarkably intact, and comprises a number of sheds and water treatment facilities, including early circular concrete ponds.
- The Pump House (c. 1942) (Bldg 8427), located north of the Treatment Works, on the western bank of Lockyer Creek. It is a small, octagonal-shaped, one-roomed, concrete building with an octagonal-pitched roof clad with corrugated metal sheeting.
- The Potato Shed (no UQ number), located further north on the east side of the northern ring road. It is a timber-framed bunker with the above-ground structure clad in corrugated galvanized iron.
- c. 1930s Staff Houses and Gardens, and in some instances, just the gardens where houses have been removed, along the Lockyer Creek ring road. The mature trees in these gardens contribute significantly to the aesthetic values of the campus. The houses are all high-set weatherboard "Queenslanders".
- The main building in the Crop Research Unit (c. 1940s) (Bldg 8419), located at the northern end of the campus, on the southeast bank of Lockyer Creek. It is a long, narrow, low-set building with a concrete block base to sill height and timber-framing and weatherboards above. It has a hipped roof clad with corrugated sheeting. There is a brick chimney rising above the roof near the northeast end of the building. The whole rests on a concrete plinth.
- The Dressing Shed (Bldg 8441), located adjacent to Lockyer Creek at the northwest end of the campus, above a former popular swimming hole. It is a long, narrow, low-set, timber-framed structure composed of three sections. The middle section has a gable roof and exposed external timber framing on three sides and weatherboard cladding on the fourth wall overlooking Lockyer Creek. The walls are lined with corrugated iron sheeting. Either side of this central section is a long, narrow dressing room with a skillion roof of corrugated iron and all walls clad externally with weatherboards and unlined internally. Floors throughout are concrete. Entrance doors to each section are in the northwest elevation overlooking the creek
- Two concrete water storage tanks and generator/pump shed (no UQ number), located adjacent to the Dressing Shed above Lockyer Creek. These are associated with the early water supply to the campus established in the late 1920s. The tanks are circular, of moulded concrete construction, and highly intact. They stand approximately 2.5 to 3 metres (8 ft 2 in to 9 ft 10 in) above ground. The generator/pump shed adjacent to the tanks is a small, timber-framed, skillion-roofed structure clad externally with corrugated metal sheeting. The generator/pump has been removed but the concrete plinth on which it rested remains.
- A row of mature exotic trees along the ridge above Lockyer Creek, located just northeast of the dressing shed. These contribute significantly to the aesthetic values of the campus.
- A row of Eucalypt spp. trees on east side of the road which formerly led from the Warrego Highway opposite the earlier main College entrance, directly north to Lockyer Creek and the Dressing Shed.

== Heritage listing ==
University of Queensland Gatton Campus (Queensland University) was listed on the Queensland Heritage Register on 6 January 2004 having satisfied the following criteria.

The place is important in demonstrating the evolution or pattern of Queensland's history.

The University of Queensland Gatton Campus was established in 1897 by the Queensland Government as the Queensland Agricultural College. It is significant as Queensland's first agricultural vocational institution and demonstrates the Queensland government's commitment to agricultural education, reflecting the vital importance of primary production in the history of the State. It has significance as Queensland's principal agricultural training educational institution for over a century, contributing to generations of best-practice farming in this State. The University of Queensland Gatton Campus also has historical significance for its role in the development of agriculture and agricultural research in Queensland through its historical and continuing links with the Queensland Department of Agriculture (now Department of Primary Industries) and the CSIR (now CSIRO). In addition, the University of Queensland Gatton Campus is significant for its wartime use as a military hospital, and a number of buildings and structures survive associated with this period.

The place has potential to yield information that will contribute to an understanding of Queensland's history.

The University of Queensland Gatton Campus is significant for its wartime use as a military hospital, and a number of buildings and structures survive associated with this period. The dump associated with this use has the potential to yield information that will contribute to an understanding of Queensland's wartime history.

The place is important in demonstrating the principal characteristics of a particular class of cultural places.

The University of Queensland Gatton Campus demonstrates the principal characteristics of a rural public educational institution, with the attributes of both a university campus and a working farm. The early-established spatial relationships between the administrative, teaching, workshop, residential, recreational, and farming elements of the site survives, as does early infrastructure including Lawes Siding Road, the original Warrego Highway entrance road, and the 1928–29 water tower and water storage tanks near Lockyer Creek.

The Foundation Building and the Homestead are evidence of the original collection of College buildings erected in 1897. Sir Leslie Wilson Hall, constructed as a gymnasium in 1899, demonstrates the recreational facilities that have been part of the campus from its establishment, and which include also a swimming hole in Lockyer Creek and an associated changing rooms building; a fine 1927 timber grandstand; ovals constructed in 1931, 1959–60 and 1965; a War Memorial Swimming Pool (1954); and an airfield (1966). Morrison Hall, constructed in 1936, is a fine example of an interwar Hall of Residence and demonstrates the principal characteristics of a timber dormitory building designed for the Queensland climate. The Farm Square precinct, which includes Farm Square (commenced 1899), the Hayshed (1923), the Merv Young Field Facilities Building (former Woolshed) (1913–15), the Weighbridge, the Blacksmith's Shop (1933), the former Dairy Factory (now the printery) (1912), Crow's Silo (1941); the Shearing Shed (1941); the Wool Classing Shed (c. 1940s); a number of other c. 1940s buildings; and an early residence (c. 1900) are important in illustrating the way in which a working farm is combined with facilities for the practical instruction of students.

The Cooper Laboratories, a complex of brick and timber buildings purpose-constructed from 1941 for the CSIR seed research program, is important in illustrating the principal characteristics of a substantially intact, 1940s agricultural research facility.

On the northern side of the Warrego Highway, the Sewerage Treatment Works and the nearby Pump House on Lockyer Creek are important in illustrating the principal characteristics of early 1940s facilities of this type, and important historically for their association with the presence of an American military hospital at the College during the Second World War. The timber Dressing Shed beside Lockyer Creek at the northwest end of the campus is a rare known surviving example of this type of recreational structure.

The place is important because of its aesthetic significance.

The Foundation Precinct, which includes the Foundation Building, the Homestead, Morrison Hall, Sir Walter Leslie Hall, the water tower, a flagpole, a sandstone memorial, and plantings of Canary Island date palms (Phoenix canariensus), has aesthetic significance derived from the combination of impressive timber vernacular architecture, intact in both form and material, and striking formal landscape qualities. The campus generally has aesthetic value generated by its landscape qualities, which include: the treed sandstone ridge on which the core of the campus sits surrounded by farm paddocks; frontages to Lockyer and Laidley Creeks; planted avenues of trees along the central spine of the College core (Phoenix canariensus), along the original entrance road off the Warrego Highway, along Lawes Siding Road; and along the former Gatton-Forest Hill/Laidley Road alignment at the southern end of the campus; and water features such as the man-made Lake Galletly. There are mature exotic trees planted throughout the campus, including those in the house gardens to the north of the Warrego Highway and along Lockyer Creek near the Dressing Shed, which contribute significantly to the aesthetic values of the campus. Views to and from the central core are valued, and the water tower is a landmark, visible from the Warrego Highway and from the Main Range at Toowoomba, 50 kilometres (31 mi) to the west.

The place has a strong or special association with a particular community or cultural group for social, cultural or spiritual reasons.

The University of Queensland Gatton Campus has a strong and special association for the University/College community both past and present for its social and educational values. The place is well known in the Queensland community for its contribution to the development of agriculture in this State.
