= Donald Mackintosh (politician) =

Australian politician

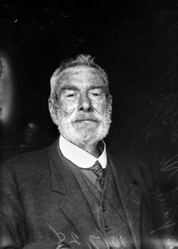

Member of the Queensland Legislative Assembly for Cambooya
- In office 18 March 1899 – 27 April 1912
- Preceded by: Henry Daniels
- Succeeded by: Seat abolished

Member of the Queensland Legislative Assembly for Pittsworth
- In office 27 April 1912 – 22 May 1915
- Preceded by: New seat
- Succeeded by: Percy Bayley

Personal details
- Born: Donald Mackintosh; 16 May 1840 Lochaber, Scotland
- Died: 5 May 1932 (aged 91) Toowoomba, Queensland, Australia
- Resting place: Drayton and Toowoomba Cemetery
- Party: Ministerial
- Other political affiliations: Opposition
- Spouse: Catherine Cowley (m.1866 d.1907)
- Occupation: Farmer

Donald Mackintosh (16 May 1840 – 5 May 1932) was a farmer and member of the Queensland Legislative Assembly.

== Early days ==
Mackintosh was born in Lochaber, Scotland, to parents James Mackintosh and his wife Mary (née Macarthur) and was educated in the local Lochaber village school. On his arrival in Australia he was a drover and the manager of the Glencoe Farm near Warwick.

== Political career ==
Having been a member of the Jondaryan Divisional Board, Mackintosh, for the Ministerialists, represented the seat of Cambooya in the Queensland Legislative Assembly from 1899 until the seat was abolished in 1912. He then moved to the new seat of Pittsworth and held the seat until he was defeated in 1915.

== Personal life ==
In 1866, Mackintosh married Catherine Cowley (died 1907) and together had five sons and three daughters.

He died in Toowoomba in 1932 and was buried in Drayton and Toowoomba Cemetery.

Parliament of Queensland
Preceded by Henry Daniels	Member for Cambooya; 1899–1912	Abolished
New seat	Member for Pittsworth; 1912–1915	Succeeded by Percy Bayley
