= William Lovejoy =

Australian politician

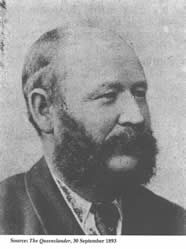

Member of the Queensland Legislative Assembly for Aubigny
- In office 29 April 1893 – 18 July 1894
- Preceded by: James Campbell
- Succeeded by: William Thorn

Personal details
- Born: William Thomas Lovejoy; 1849 Harlington, London
- Died: 1913 (aged 63–64) Dalby, Queensland, Australia
- Resting place: Dalby Monumental Cemetery
- Party: Opposition
- Spouse: Annie Wockner (Klockner?) (d.1942)
- Occupation: Publican

William Thomas Lovejoy (1849 – 24 August 1913) was a Member of the Queensland Legislative Assembly.

== Early life ==
Lovejoy was born in Middlesex, England, the son of Thomas Lovejoy and his wife Haligton (née Wildlesea). He arrived in Queensland in 1872 and commenced work as a station hand at Eton Vale. Lovejoy took up a Selection at Meringandan and built the first Hotel there which sold in 1890.

== Politics ==
Winning the seat of Aubigny in 1893, Lovejoy served just 15 months before having to resign in 1894 due to his insolvency.

Though he served as one of the Labour Farmers' representatives, he disavowed the extremists, promising to support the government "in all good measures for the benefit of farmers".

His opponent in the election was William Thorn, a representative in support of Opposition policy.

== Later life ==
Lovejoy became host of the Travellers Home Hotel in Toowoomba and then built The Pioneers Arms, the first hotel in Goombungee. His last home was Spring Grove in the Bell area of the Darling downs. Lovejoy died in 1913 and was buried in Dalby Monumental Cemetery.

Parliament of Queensland
Preceded by James Campbell	Member for Aubigny; 1893–1894	Succeeded by William Thorn
