= Donald McIntyre (Queensland politician) =

Member of the Queensland Legislative Assembly

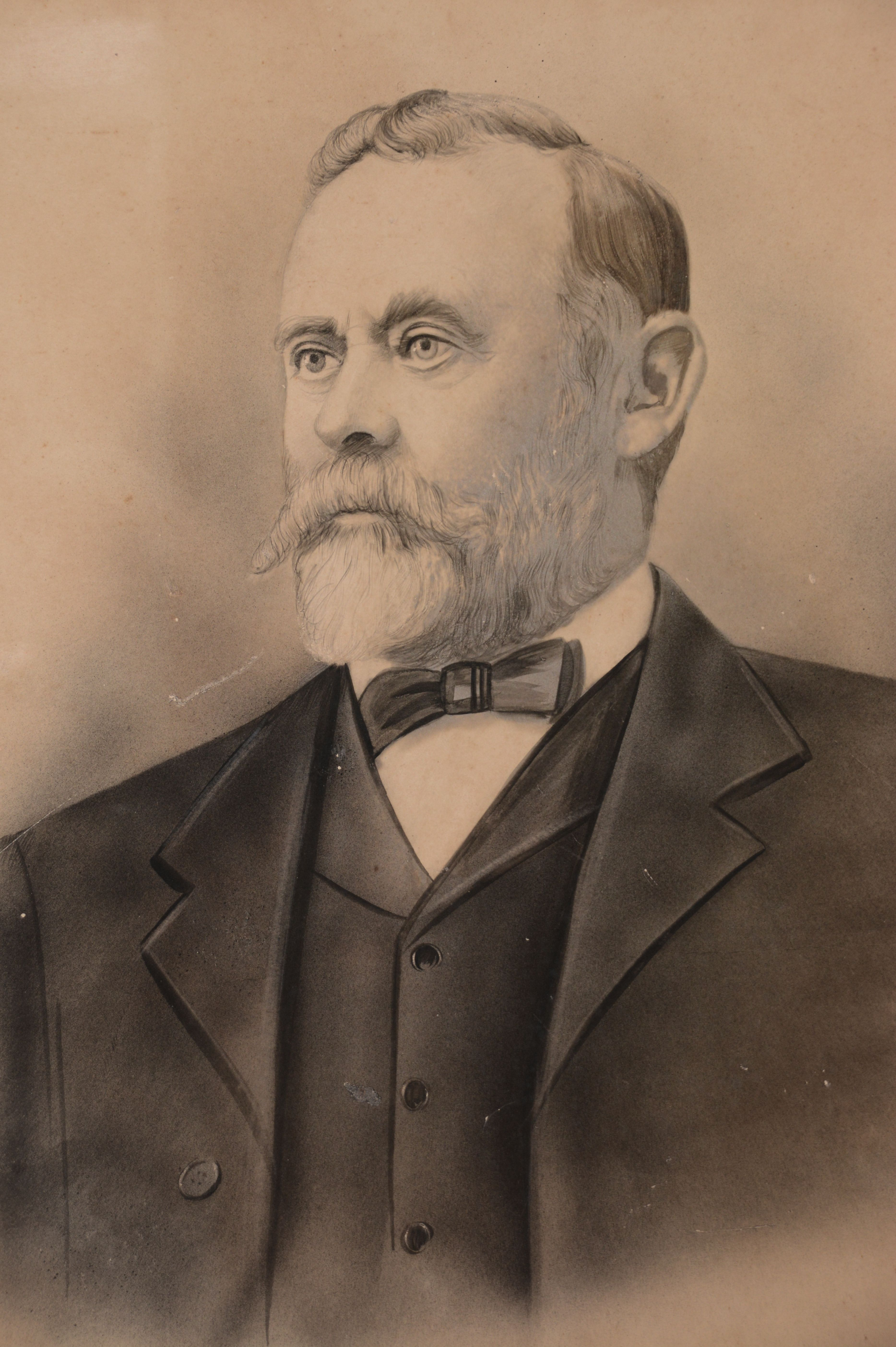

Member of the Queensland Legislative Assembly for Aubigny
- In office 18 May 1907 – 5 February 1908
- Preceded by: John O'Brien
- Succeeded by: William Thorn

Personal details
- Born: Donald McIntyre; 20 April 1851 Loch Lomond, Scotland
- Died: 6 November 1927 (aged 76) Toowoomba, Queensland, Australia
- Resting place: Drayton and Toowoomba Cemetery
- Party: Kidstonites
- Spouse: Mary Jane Keag (m.1877 d.1942)
- Occupation: Station worker, Cheese maker

Donald McIntyre (20 April 1851 – 6 November 1927) was a Member of the Queensland Legislative Assembly.

== Early life ==
McIntyre was born near Loch Lomond, Scotland in 1851. The son of Peter McIntyre and his wife Jane (née McFarlane), he came to Australia with his family in 1862, sailing on the Ocean Chief and landing at Moreton Bay. He found work at several Stations over the years before establishing the Greenmount Cheese Factory in 1893. He went on to open a further two cheese factories at Zahley (near present-day Goombungee) and Quinalow.

== Politics ==
McIntyre won the seat of Aubigny for the Kidstonites in the 1907 state election. He served less than nine months before losing his seat at the 1908 state election.

== Personal life ==
McIntyre married Mary Jane Keag on 10 July 1877 and together they had nine children. He died in 1927 and was buried in the Drayton and Toowoomba Cemetery.

Parliament of Queensland
Preceded by John O'Brien	Member for Aubigny; 1907–1908	Succeeded by William Thorn
