= Electoral district of Aubigny =

Former state electoral district of Queensland, Australia

Aubigny Queensland—Legislative Assembly
- State: Queensland
- Created: 1873
- Abolished: 1972
- Demographic: Southern Rural
- Coordinates: 27°31′S 151°39′E

The electoral district of Aubigny was a Legislative Assembly electorate in the state of Queensland. It was first created in a redistribution ahead of the 1873 colonial election, and existed until the 1972 state election.

Based in the Darling Downs to the north and west of the regional city of Toowoomba, Aubigny was a safe seat for the Country Party, being held by every one of its incarnations from 1915 until 1960, when it was won by the Queensland Labor Party MP Les Diplock, transferring from Condamine. Diplock held the seat as the sole parliamentary representative of the QLP (which merged with the national Democratic Labor Party in 1962) until the seat's abolition in 1972.

Its most notable member was Arthur Edward Moore, member from 1915 until 1941 and Premier of Queensland from 1929 to 1932.

== History ==
The seat's boundaries changed at a number of redistributions, but remained a seat in the rural hinterland between Dalby and Toowoomba, and to the north of Toowoomba. The seat's place of nomination was consistently either Crows Nest or Oakey, both of which were present in all incarnations of the electorate. The seat originally extended as far north as Nanango and Blackbutt whilst only extending a short distance west to Oakey; however, at the 1912 election, its north–south distance was cut by about half, with the northern areas going to the new seat of Nanango and some areas on Toowoomba's outskirts such as Highfields and Wellcamp going to the new seat of Drayton.

At the 1923 election, Drayton was abolished and over two successive redistributions, Aubigny both moved closer to Toowoomba and further west. However, at the 1935 election, with a new seat of East Toowoomba taking in the closer areas, Aubigny was pushed north-westwards and absorbed areas to the north and north-east of Dalby such as Jandowae and Bell. The establishment of a zonal electoral system with the Electoral Districts Act 1949 placed areas nearer to Toowoomba in a "provincial cities" zone, so these were removed from Aubigny with Westbrook and Aubigny being substituted in their place.

The final incarnation of Aubigny, beginning from the 1960 election, was a seat to the west and north-west of Toowoomba which included the entire town of Dalby within its boundaries for the first time.

== Members for Aubigny ==
Member	Party	Term
Edward Wilmot Pechey		1873–1877
Patrick Perkins	Conservative	1877–1884
James Campbell	Conservative	1884–1893
William Lovejoy	Opposition	1893–1894
William Thorn	Opposition	1894–1904
John O'Brien	Labor	1904–1907
Donald McIntyre	Kidstonites	1907–1908
William Thorn	Farmer's Rep.	1908–1909
William Thorn	Liberal	1909–1912
Alfred James Luke	Liberal	1912–1915
Arthur Edward Moore	Farmers' Union	1915–1917
Arthur Edward Moore	National	1917–1919
Arthur Edward Moore	Country	1919–1925
Arthur Edward Moore	Country and Progressive National	1925–1936
Arthur Edward Moore	Country	1936–1941
Jim Sparkes	Country	1941–1960
Les Diplock	Queensland Labor	1960–1962
Les Diplock	Democratic Labor	1962–1972

== See also ==
- Electoral districts of Queensland
- Members of the Queensland Legislative Assembly by year
- Category:Members of the Queensland Legislative Assembly by name
