= Patrick Perkins =

Australian politician (1838–1901)

The Hon Patrick Perkins JP
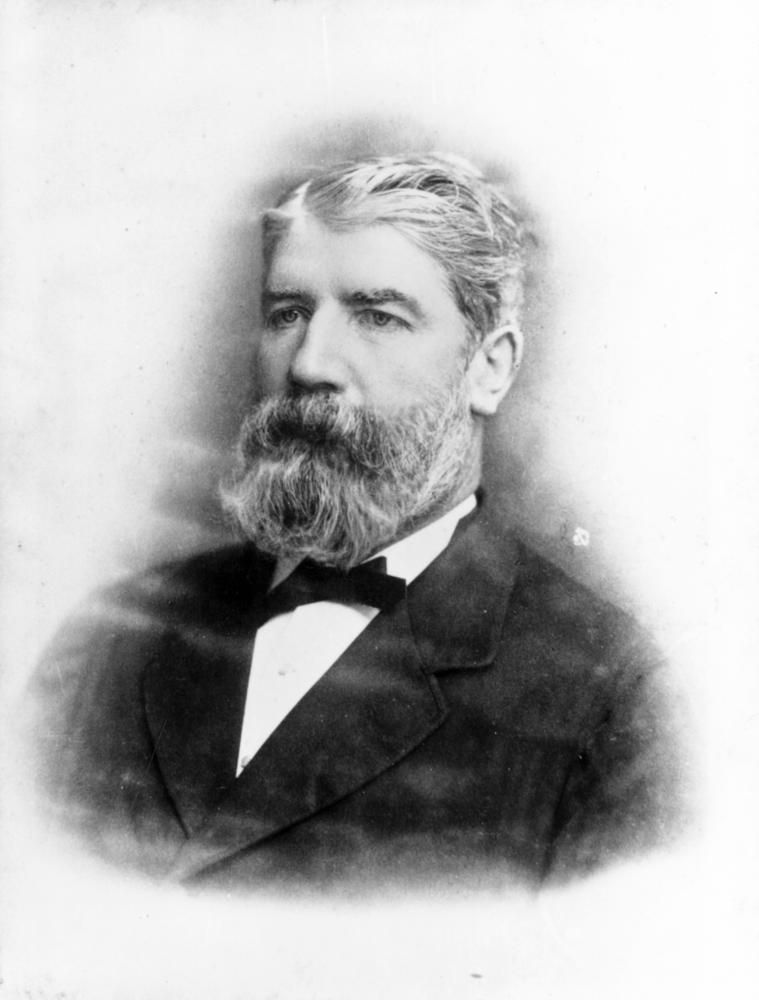

Member of the Queensland Legislative Assembly for Aubigny
- In office 1 May 1877 – 21 February 1884
- Preceded by: Edward Pechey
- Succeeded by: James Campbell

Member of the Queensland Legislative Assembly for Cambooya
- In office 10 May 1888 – 6 May 1893
- Preceded by: New seat
- Succeeded by: Henry Daniels

Member of the Queensland Legislative Council
- In office 23 May 1893 – 17 May 1901

Personal details
- Born: Patrick Perkins; 10 October 1838 Cashel, County Tipperary, Ireland
- Died: 17 May 1901 (aged 62) Hawthorn, Victoria, Australia
- Resting place: Boroondara General Cemetery
- Spouse: Mary Ellen Hickey
- Occupation: Brewer

Hon. Patrick Perkins, J. P., (10 October 1838 – 17 May 1901), nicknamed Paddy Perkins, was a brewer and politician in colonial Queensland. He was a Member of the Queensland Legislative Assembly and, later, a Member of the Queensland Legislative Council.

== Early life ==
Patrick Perkins was born in a cottage on a small farm in the village of Clonoulty near Cashel, County Tipperary, Ireland. He was the second son of Thomas Perkins, a farmer, and his wife Ellen (née Gooley). He attended the local National School.

Thomas and Ellen Perkins and their eight children (including Patrick) immigrated on the Persian, departing Southampton and arrived in Melbourne, Victoria, Australia on 9 April 1854.

In 1861, he married Mary Ellen Hickey in Victoria. They had four children born in Victoria:Thomas Hector (born 1864); Mary Eveleen, (1867–1942) m. Charles Allan; Edgar Colin Francis (born 1868) and Lilly Eleanor Perkins (born 1875) m. Randall Macdonnell, m. George Wilkie Gray. They had two children born in Queensland: Patrick Harold (born 1878) and Helene Cicilia (born 1880, Toowoomba d 1965 Adelaide), Sr Margaret Mary of the Dominican priory, Adelaide.

== Business ==
Patrick Perkins was a miner and storekeeper on the diggings in Victoria in districts including Ballarat, Bendigo, Woods Point and Jamieson.

With his brother Thomas, he started breweries in Victoria and Queensland. In 1866, Patrick Perkins started the Perkins Brewery in Toowoomba. In 1872, he later extended his operations to Brisbane with the purchase of the City Brewery in 1872.

In 1876, Patrick Perkins moved to Queensland in order to manage the Brisbane and Toowoomba breweries.

Perkins also had interests in property and mining, including the Mount Morgan Mine and coal mining in the West Moreton area.

He was considered a shrewd and successful business man.

== Politics ==
On 9 April 1877, Edward Wilmot Pechey, the member of the Queensland Legislative Assembly in the seat of Aubigny, resigned. On 1 May 1877, in a by-election, Perkins was elected in Aubigny, defeating Angus Mackay (the then editor of The Queenslander) by a large majority. He was elected again in Aubigny in the 1878 election and was appointed as Minister of Lands in the First McIlwraith Ministry from 21 January 1879 to 13 November 1883.

Perkins was elected again in Aubigny in the 1883 election, However, allegations about electoral fraud (including intimidation, bribery, and ballot stuffing) in the Aubigny election started to surface, resulting in a petition to the Governor of Queensland detailing numerous kind of electoral fraud and asking to declare that the Aubigny election was void and that Patrick Perkins was guilty of bribery and corruption. On 21 February 1884, the Committee of Elections and Qualifications ruled the Aubigny election was null and void and called for a by-election. Perkins had denied any involvement in the alleged electoral fraud and the Committee of Elections and Qualifications did not disqualify him from re-contesting the seat, which provoked outrage in some quarters. However, Patrick Perkins announced he would not re-contest the seat as he would be taking a trip to England. James Campbell was elected unopposed at the resulting by-election on 4 March 1884.

At the 1888 election, Perkins was elected in the seat of Cambooya on 10 May 1888, which he held until 6 May 1893.

On 23 May 1893, Perkins was appointed to Queensland Legislative Council from 23 May 1893. Being a lifetime appointment, he served until his death on 17 May 1901.

== The house "Aubigny" ==
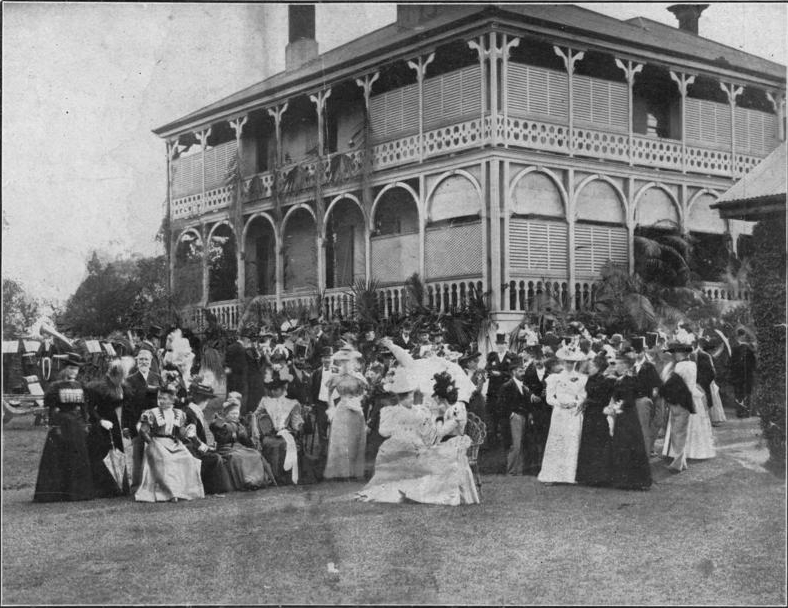
Aubigny, at North Quay, Brisbane, 1897, when Miss Lilly Perkins married Mr Randal McDonnell

In 1883 used his wealth to buy a palatial home at 273 North Quay, Brisbane, which he called "Aubigny" after the electorate that first sent him to parliament. The house was originally built in 1870 by Samuel Davis, a Jewish businessman, and included a separate building used as Brisbane's first synagogue. Patrick Perkins used the former synagogue as a billiards room. In 1899, the Perkins family rented the property to the Criminal Investigation Department which used the house as offices and the synagogue as a photography room. In 1906, the house was sold to the Rev. Mother Patrick of the Sisters of Mercy to create the 20-bed Mater Misericordiae Hospital (now a tertiary hospital located at South Brisbane); the former synagogue being the hospital chapel. Once the hospital outgrew the house and relocated to the South Brisbane area where it still operates, the house was renamed "Loretto" and used as a hostel for Catholic girls; the former synagogue being the maids' quarters. In about 1939 the house was demolished to make way for the construction of a church for the Church of Christ, Scientist.

== Later life ==
He attended the opening of the first Federal Parliament at the Royal Exhibition Building on 9 May 1901 and caught a chill which developed into bronchial pneumonia, from which he died on Friday 17 May 1901 at "Ingleborough", Berkeley Street, Hawthorn. On Saturday 18 May 1901, his funeral was conducted at the Roman Catholic church at Glenferrie, after which he was buried in the Boroondara General Cemetery in Kew, Melbourne.

In 1928, the Perkins brewing company was bought by their rivals Castlemaine Brewery with new company being known as Castlemaine Perkins Limited.

== See also ==
- Members of the Queensland Legislative Assembly, 1873–1878; 1878–1883; 1883–1888; 1888–1893
- Members of the Queensland Legislative Council, 1890–1899; 1900–1909

Parliament of Queensland
Preceded by Edward Pechey	Member for Aubigny; 1877–1884	Succeeded by James Campbell
New seat	Member for Cambooya; 1888–1893	Succeeded by Henry Daniels
