= William Thorn (politician) =

Australian politician

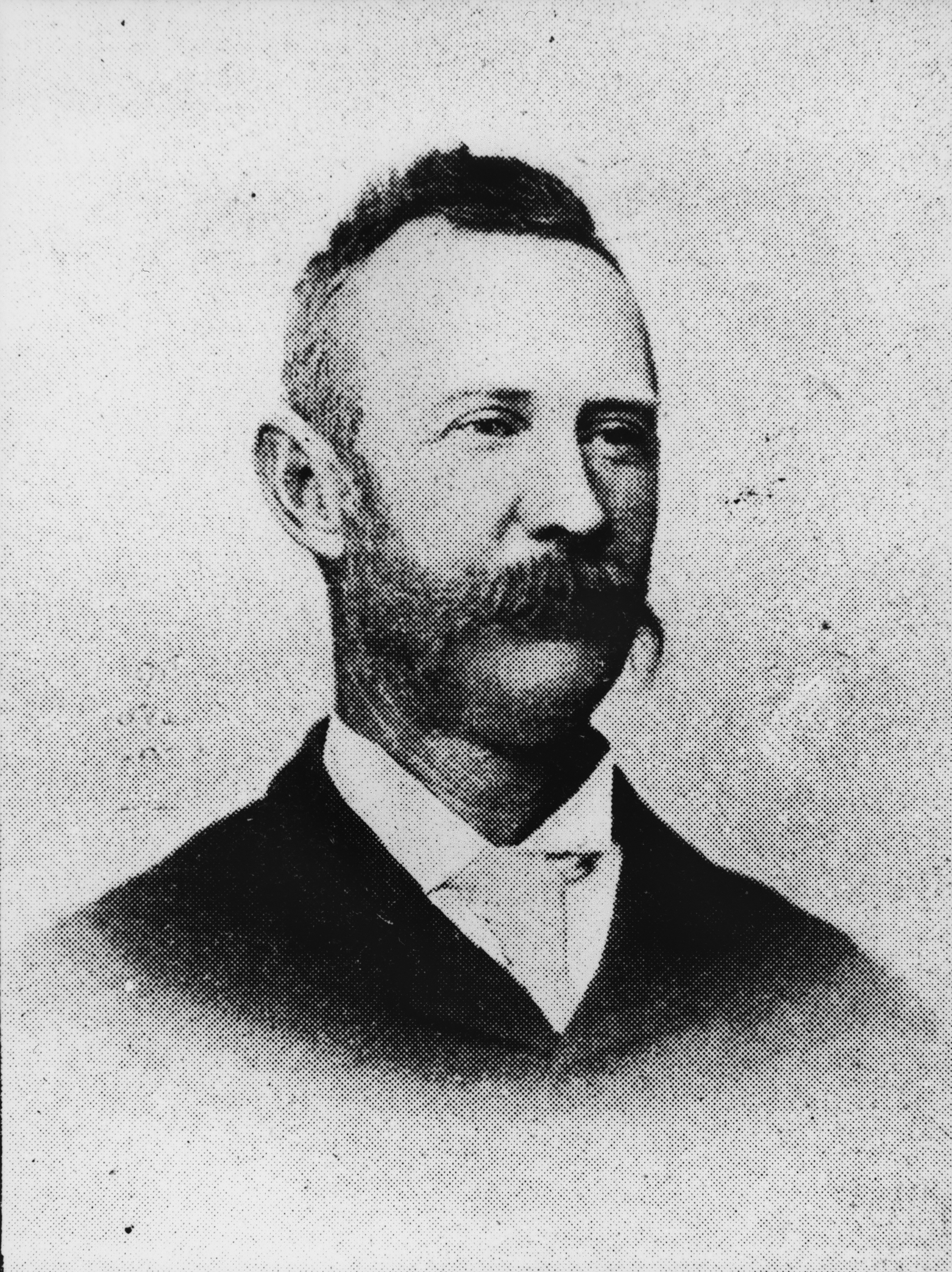
- William Thorn M.L.A, 1894

Member of the Queensland Legislative Assembly for Aubigny
- In office 4 August 1894 – 27 August 1904
- Preceded by: William Lovejoy
- Succeeded by: John O'Brien
- In office 5 February 1908 – 27 April 1912
- Preceded by: Donald McIntyre
- Succeeded by: Alfred Luke

Personal details
- Born: William Thorn; 3 September 1852 Ipswich, Colony of New South Wales
- Died: 1 February 1935 (aged 82) Crows Nest, Queensland, Australia
- Resting place: Drayton and Toowoomba Cemetery
- Party: Opposition
- Spouse: Georgina Ord (m.1876 d.1943)
- Relations: George Thorn Sr. (father), George Thorn Jr. (brother), Henry Thorn (brother), John Thorn (brother)
- Occupation: Grazier

William Thorn (3 September 1852 – 1 February 1935) was a grazier and politician in Queensland, Australia. He was a Member of the Queensland Legislative Assembly.

== Early life ==
William Thorn was born in September 1852 in Ipswich, Colony of New South Wales, the son of George Thorn and his wife Jane, née Hancock.

== Politics ==
William Thorn was elected to the Queensland Legislative Assembly in the electoral district of Aubigny from 1894 to 1904 and again from 1908 to 1912.

The former Wilthorn railway station in Kelvinhaugh on the Cooyar railway line was named after him.

== Later life ==
William Thorn died on 1 February 1935 at his son's pastoral property Milford Rocks, Crows Nest, Queensland and was buried in Drayton and Toowoomba Cemetery.

Parliament of Queensland
Preceded by William Lovejoy	Member for Aubigny; 1894–1904	Succeeded by John O'Brien
Preceded by Donald McIntyre	Member for Aubigny; 1908–1912	Succeeded by Alfred Luke
