= James Campbell (Queensland politician) =

Australian politician

Member for Aubigny
- In office 4 March 1884 – 29 April 1893
- Preceded by: Patrick Perkins
- Succeeded by: William Lovejoy

Personal details
- Born: James Campbell; 28 October 1838 Newtown Cook's River, New South Wales, Australia
- Died: 13 September 1925 (aged 86) Brisbane, Queensland, Australia
- Resting place: Toowong Cemetery
- Spouse: Sarah Ann Lovell
- Occupation: Businessman

James Campbell, MLA for Aubigny

James Campbell (28 October 1838 – 13 September 1925) was a politician in Queensland, Australia. He was a Member of the Queensland Legislative Assembly.

== Early life ==
The son of Hugh Campbell and Helen (née Fraser), Campbell was born in Newtown Cook's River, New South Wales. He became a butcher and grazier. With his wife, Sarah Ann Lovell (married 1866, died 1935), Campbell had four sons and seven daughters.

== Politics ==
Campbell was mayor of the Town of Toowoomba in 1882. His brother, Charles Campbell was also the town's mayor in 1886 and a member of the Queensland Legislative Council.

James Campbell represented Aubigny in the Queensland Legislative Assembly from 4 March 1884 to 29 April 1893.

== Later life ==
Campbell died 13 September 1925 and was buried in Toowong Cemetery.

Parliament of Queensland
Preceded by Patrick Perkins	Member for Aubigny; 1884–1893	Succeeded by William Lovejoy
