= Alfred James Luke =

Australian politician

Alfred Luke

Member of the Queensland Legislative Assembly for Aubigny
- In office 27 April 1912 – 22 May 1915
- Preceded by: William Thorn
- Succeeded by: Arthur Moore

Personal details
- Born: Alfred James Luke; 9 March 1871 Murrurundi, New South Wales, Australia
- Died: 11 September 1920 (aged 49) Toowoomba, Queensland, Australia
- Resting place: Drayton and Toowoomba Cemetery
- Party: Ministerial
- Spouse: Emily Maud Lawson

Alfred James Luke (9 March 1871 – 11 September 1920) was a politician in Queensland, Australia. He was a Member of the Queensland Legislative Assembly.

== Political life ==
Alfred Luke was a member of the Rosalie Shire Council and its chairman from 1907 to 1910.

Alfred Luke represented the electoral district of Aubigny in the Queensland Legislative Assembly from 27 April 1912 to 22 May 1915. He was elected in the 1912 Queensland state election. He stood for re-election in the 1915 Queensland state election but was defeated by Arthur Edward Moore.

Luke died in 1920 and was buried in Drayton and Toowoomba Cemetery.

Parliament of Queensland
Preceded by William Thorn	Member for Aubigny; 1912–1915	Succeeded by Arthur Edward Moore
