= John O'Brien (Australian politician) =

Australian politician

Member of the Queensland Legislative Assembly for Aubigny
- In office 27 August 1904 – 18 May 1907
- Preceded by: William Thorn
- Succeeded by: Donald McIntyre

Personal details
- Born: John O'Brien; 6 July 1866 Harlaxton, Queensland, Australia
- Died: 8 October 1932 (aged 66) Toowoomba, Queensland, Australia
- Resting place: Drayton and Toowoomba Cemetery
- Party: Labour Party
- Spouse: Margaret Mary Fahy (m.1899)
- Occupation: Farmer, road contractor

John O'Brien (6 July 1866 – 8 October 1932) was a Member of the Queensland Legislative Assembly.

== Early life ==
O'Brien was born in Harlaxton, a suburb of Toowoomba, Queensland. The son of Patrick O'Brien and his wife Mary (née O'Neil), he took over the family farm in 1887 after the death of his father. He then became involved in road construction and was responsible for many public works in the Toowoomba area. O'Brien married Margaret Mary Fahy in 1899 and together they had four children.

== Politics ==
O'Brien was a member of the Highfields Divisional Board from 1896 to 1898. He then won the Labour Party endorsement for the seat of Aubigny, which he duly won in 1904. O'Brien served one term and did not stand for re-election in 1907.

== Later life ==
Losing his farm after politics, he took up work as a yardman at a Hotel in Brisbane. O'Brien died in 1932 and was buried in the Drayton and Toowoomba Cemetery.

Parliament of Queensland
Preceded by William Thorn	Member for Aubigny; 1904–1907	Succeeded by Donald McIntyre
