= Edward Wilmot Pechey =

Australian politician

Edward Pechey
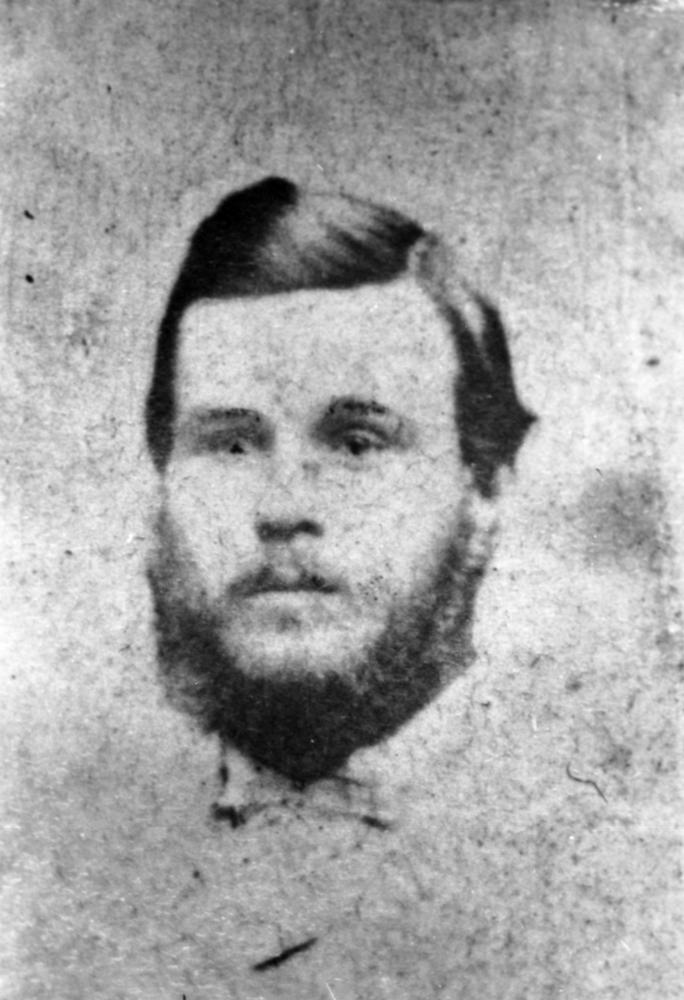
- Edward Wilmot Pechey, ca. 1865

Member of the Queensland Legislative Assembly for Aubigny
- In office 11 November 1873 – 9 April 1877
- Preceded by: New seat
- Succeeded by: Patrick Perkins

Personal details
- Born: Edward Wilmot Pechey; 9 November 1841 Colchester, Essex, England
- Died: 28 April 1904 (aged 62) Toowoomba, Queensland, Australia
- Resting place: Drayton and Toowoomba Cemetery
- Spouse: Helen Maria Bond
- Occupation: Surveyor, businessman

Edward Wilmot Pechey (9 November 1841 – 28 April 1904) was a Member of the Legislative Assembly in Queensland, Australia.

== Early life ==
Edward Pechey was born on 9 November 1841 in Langham near Colchester, Essex, England, the son of William Pechey and his wife Sarah (née Rotton). He immigrated to Sydney in 1858 and relocated to Queensland about 1869.

He married Helen Maria Bond in Toowoomba on 19 September 1872.

== Business life ==
As assistant surveyor to the Queensland Government Surveyor, Henry Haig, he surveyed Condamine and Campbell's Camp. He was involved with the sawmills at Highfields and Crows Nest. He also speculated in real estate in the Toowoomba area.

== Politics ==
On 11 November 1873 in the 1873 colonial elections, Pechey was elected to Queensland Legislative Assembly in the seat of Aubigny. He resigned on 9 April 1877 and Patrick Perkins won the resulting by-election on 1 May 1877.

== Later years ==
In his later years, he led a quiet life. He was a great reader and studied eastern philosophies. He was also a prominent member of the Queensland Theosophical Society.

He died in Toowoomba on 28 April 1904; he was survived by his widow and four children. He was buried in the Church of England section of the Drayton and Toowoomba Cemetery.

== Legacy ==
The locality of Pechey and the mountain peak Pechey Knob are named after him.

== See also ==
- Members of the Queensland Legislative Assembly, 1873–1878

Parliament of Queensland
New seat	Member for Aubigny; 1873–1877	Succeeded by Patrick Perkins
